= List of Nunavut Legislative Assemblies =

This is a list of assemblies of the Legislative Assembly of Nunavut, the legislature of the Canadian territory of Nunavut, since its creation as a Canadian territory on April 1, 1999. The first legislative assembly of Nunavut was formed in 1999, after the 1999 Nunavut general election. The Nunavut territorial legislature uses a consensus government system without political parties, and the premier is chosen by and from the members of the assembly.

== List of Parliaments ==
Assembly Sessions	Election	From To	Premier	Speaker
1st Assembly	1st general	April 1, 1999; 2004	Paul Okalik	Levi Barnabas (1999–2000); Kevin O'Brien (2000–2004)
2nd Assembly	2nd general	2004; 2008	Paul Okalik	Jobie Nutarak (2004–2006); Peter Kilabuk (2006–2008)
3rd Assembly	3rd general	2008; 2013	Eva Aariak	James Arreak (2008–2010); Paul Okalik (2010–2011); Hunter Tootoo (2011–2013)
4th Assembly	4th general	2013; 2017	Peter Taptuna	George Qulaut
5th Assembly	5th general	2017; 2021	Paul Quassa (November 21, 2017–June 14, 2018); Joe Savikataaq (June 14, 2018–November 19, 2021)	Joe Enook (November 21, 2017–March 29, 2019); Simeon Mikkungwak (May 28, 2019 – February 25, 2020); Paul Quassa (February 25, 2020–August 13, 2021)
6th Assembly	6th general	2021; 2025	P.J. Akeeagok (November 19, 2021–present)	Tony Akoak (August 13, 2021–present)
7th Assembly	7th general	2025 present	John Main (2025–present)	David Joanasie (2025–present)
