= List of Nunavut by-elections =

Canadian territorial by-elections

The list of Nunavut by-elections includes every by-election held in the Canadian territory of Nunavut. By-elections occur whenever there is a vacancy in the Legislative Assembly, although an imminent general election may allow the vacancy to remain until the dissolution of the legislative assembly.

== 7th Nunavut Legislative Assembly 2025– ==
By-election	Date	Incumbent	Party	Winner	Party	Cause	Retained
Aggu	December 15, 2025	Joanna Quassa	Non-partisan consensus government	Edward Attagutaluk	Non-partisan consensus government	Two-way tie between Joanna Quassa and Erasmus Ivvalu in the general election	No

== 6th Nunavut Legislative Assembly 2021–2025 ==
None

== 5th Nunavut Legislative Assembly 2017–2021 ==
By-election	Date	Incumbent	Party	Winner	Party	Cause	Retained
Baker Lake	July 24, 2020†	Simeon Mikkungwak	Non-partisan consensus government	Craig Simailak	Non-partisan consensus government	Resignation	Yes
Kugluktuk	July 24, 2020†	Mila Adjukak Kamingoak	Non-partisan consensus government	Calvin Pedersen	Non-partisan consensus government	Resignation	No
Tununiq	September 16, 2019	Joe Enook	Non-partisan consensus government	David Qamaniq	Non-partisan consensus government	Death	No

† Won by acclamation; this date is the closing date of the filing period for declarations of candidacy.

== 4th Nunavut Legislative Assembly 2013–2017 ==
By-election	Date	Incumbent	Party	Winner	Party	Cause	Retained
Netsilik	February 8, 2016	Jeannie Ugyuk	Non-partisan consensus government	Emiliano Qirngnuq	Non-partisan consensus government	Resignation	Yes
Uqqummiut	February 9, 2015	Samuel Nuqingaq	Non-partisan consensus government	Pauloosie Keyootak	Non-partisan consensus government	Expulsion	Yes
Rankin Inlet South	February 10, 2014	Lorne Kusugak	Non-partisan consensus government	Alexander Sammurtok	Non-partisan consensus government	Two-way tie in general election	No

== 3rd Nunavut Legislative Assembly 2008–2013 ==
By-election	Date	Incumbent	Party	Winner	Party	Cause	Retained
Iqaluit West	September 12, 2011	Paul Okalik	Non-partisan consensus government	Monica Ell-Kanayuk	Non-partisan consensus government	Resignation	Yes
Pangnirtung	September 12, 2011	Adamee Komoartok	Non-partisan consensus government	Hezakiah Oshutapik	Non-partisan consensus government	Resignation	No
Tununiq	September 12, 2011	James Arvaluk	Non-partisan consensus government	Joe Enook	Non-partisan consensus government	Resignation	Yes
Nattilik	April 26, 2010	Enuk Pauloosie	Non-partisan consensus government	Jeannie Ugyuk	Non-partisan consensus government	Resignation	Yes
Akulliq	March 2, 2009	Steve Mapsalak	Non-partisan consensus government	John Ningark	Non-partisan consensus government	Judicial recount of previous by-election resulted in two-way tie	No
Akulliq	December 15, 2008	Steve Mapsalak	Non-partisan consensus government	Two-way tie between Steve Mapsalak and John Ningark	Non-partisan consensus government	Delay in general election due to candidacy dispute	No
South Baffin	November 3, 2008	Olayuk Akesuk	Non-partisan consensus government	Fred Schell	Non-partisan consensus government	No declarations of candidacy received by general election submission deadline	No

== 2nd Nunavut Legislative Assembly 2004–2008 ==
By-election	Date	Incumbent	Party	Winner	Party	Cause	Retained
Tununiq	October 16, 2006	Jobie Nutarak	Non-partisan consensus government	James Arvaluk	Non-partisan consensus government	Death	Yes

== 1st Nunavut Legislative Assembly 1999–2004 ==
By-election	Date	Incumbent	Party	Winner	Party	Cause	Retained
Nanulik	September 2, 2003	James Arvaluk	Non-partisan consensus government	Patterk Netser	Non-partisan consensus government	Resignation	Yes
Quttiktuq	December 4, 2000	Levi Barnabas	Non-partisan consensus government	Rebekah Williams	Non-partisan consensus government	Resignation	No

== See also ==
- List of federal by-elections in Canada
