= 2nd Nunavut Legislature =

Legislative assembly of Nunavut (2004–2008)

- Consensus parliament
- Mar. 9, 2004 – Sep. 22, 2008

Parliament leaders
- Premier: Paul Okalik; April 1, 1999 - November 14, 2008
- Members: 22 seats

Sovereign
- Monarch: Elizabeth II; February 6, 1952 – September 8, 2022
- Commissioner: Peter Irniq; April 1, 2000 - April 21, 2005
- Ann Meekitjuk Hanson; April 21, 2005 - April 10, 2010
← 1st	→ 3rd

The 2nd Nunavut Legislature lasted from 2004 to 2008. The government of premier Paul Okalik was sustained for a second term after the members of the Legislative Assembly of Nunavut re-elected him as premier.

The legislature began after the second general election on February 16, 2004 when 19 members were returned with 6 of those being incumbents.

== Membership in the 2nd assembly ==
=== Members elected in the 2nd general election ===
Member	Riding	First elected / previously elected	No. of terms
Steve Mapsalak	Akulliq	2004	1st term
Louis Tapardjuk	Amittuq	2004	1st term
David Alagalak	Arviat	2004	1st term
David Simailak	Baker Lake	2004	1st term
Keith Peterson	Cambridge Bay	2004	1st term
Peter Kattuk	Hudson Bay	1999	2nd term
Hunter Tootoo	Iqaluit Centre	1999	2nd term
Ed Picco	Iqaluit East	1995	3rd term
Paul Okalik	Iqaluit West	1999	2nd term
Joe Evyagotailak	Kugluktuk	2004	1st term
Patterk Netser	Nanulik	2003	2nd term
Leona Aglukkaq	Nattilik	2004	1st term
Peter Kilabuk	Pangnirtung	1999	2nd term
Levi Barnabas	Quttiktuq	1995, 2004	3rd term*
Tagak Curley	Rankin Inlet North	1979, (Note: Keewatin South/Aivilik (NWT)) 2004	3rd term*
Levinia Brown	Rankin Inlet South/Whale Cove	2004	1st term
Olayuk Akesuk	South Baffin	1999	2nd term
Jobie Nutarak	Tununiq	1999	2nd term
James Arvaluk (2006)	Tununiq	1991, (Note: Aivilik (NWT)) 1999, (Note: Nanulik) 2006	3rd term*
James Arreak	Uqqummiut	1979, 2004	2nd term*

== Membership changes ==
Date	Member	Riding	Reason
February 16, 2004	See list of members		Election day of the 2nd Nunavut general election
April 22, 2006	Jobie Nutarak	Tununiq	Died in a snowmobile accident
October 17, 2006	James Arvaluk	Tununiq	Elected in a by-election
August 20, 2008	Joe Evyagotailak	Kugluktuk	Vacated seat to run for the position of President in the Kitikmeot Inuit Association
October 10, 2008	Leona Aglukkaq	Nattilik	Vacated seat to run in the 2008 Canadian federal election
