= 1st Nunavut Legislature =

First legislative assembly of Nunavut (1999–2004)

- Consensus parliament
- Apr. 1, 1999 – Jan. 16, 2004

Parliament leaders
- Premier: Paul Okalik; Apr 1, 1999 - Nov 14, 2008
- Members: 19 seats

Sovereign
- Monarch: Elizabeth II; February 6, 1952 – September 8, 2022
- Commissioner: Helen Mamayaok Maksagak; April 1 1999 - April 1, 2000
- Peter Irniq; April 1, 2000 - April 21, 2005
→ 2nd

The 1st Nunavut Legislature lasted from 1999 to 2004. The nineteen members were elected in the 1999 Nunavut general election held 15 February. The Legislative Assembly of Nunavut runs on a consensus style government, members are elected as non-partisan and the assembly meets as a whole to elect a premier, the cabinet and the speaker. The premier hands out the cabinet jobs.

The cabinet is considered the government and the Regular members are considered the opposition. The make up of the assembly acts as a minority parliament. The cabinet must gain the support of the regular members in order to pass bills. Traditionally the cabinet votes as a block known as cabinet solidarity.

== Cabinet ministers ==
Cabinet ministers
District	Member	Position
Iqaluit West	Paul Okalik	Premier; Minister of Executive and Intergovernmental Affairs; Minister of Aboriginal Affairs; Minister of Justice
Cambridge Bay	Kelvin Ng	Minister of Finance; Minister of Human Resources; Government House Leader
Nanulik	James Arvaluk	Minister of Education^{1}
Iqaluit East	Ed Picco	Minister of Health and Social Services; Minister of Nunavut Power Corporation
Rankin Inlet South/Whale Cove	Manitok Thompson	Minister of Public Works, Telecommunications and Technical Services Minister of Education^{2}
Pangnirtung	Peter Kilabuk	Minister of Sustainable Development
Kugluktuk	Donald Havioyak	Minister of Culture, Language, Elders and Youth; Minister responsible for the status of women.

1. James Arvaluk was removed from the cabinet in 2003 after being charged with assault.
2. Manitok Thompson took over as Minister of Education from 2003 to 2004

== Speaker ==
Speaker of the Legislative Assembly
District	Member	Years as speaker
Quttiktuq	Levi Barnabas^{1}	1999 - 2000
Arviat	Kevin O'Brien	2000 - 2004

1. Levi Barnabas was convicted of Sexual Assault in 2000

== Members ==
Members elected in the 1999 general election
District	Member	First elected / previously elected	No. of terms
Akulliq	Ovide Alakannuark	1999	1st term
Amittuq	Enoki Irqittuq	1999	1st term
Arviat	Kevin O'Brien	1995	2nd term
Baker Lake	Glenn McLean	1999	1st term
Cambridge Bay	Kelvin Ng	1993	3rd term
Hudson Bay	Peter Kattuk	1999	1st term
Iqaluit Centre	Hunter Tootoo	1999	1st term
Iqaluit East	Ed Picco	1995	2nd term
Iqaluit West	Paul Okalik	1999	1st term
Kugluktuk	Donald Havioyak	1999	1st term
Nanulik	James Arvaluk	1991, (Note: Aivilik (NWT)) 1999	2nd term*
Nanulik	Patterk Netser (2003)	2003	1st term
Nattilik	Uriash Puqiqnak	1999	1st term
Pangnirtung	Peter Kilabuk	1999	1st term
Quttiktuq	Levi Barnabas	1995	2nd term
Quttiktuq	Rebekah Williams (2000)	2000	1st term
Rankin Inlet North	Jack Anawak	1999	1st term
Rankin Inlet South/Whale Cove	Manitok Thompson	1995	3rd term
South Baffin	Olayuk Akesuk	1999	1st term
Tununiq	Jobie Nutarak	1999	1st term
Uqqummiut	David Iqaqrialu	1999	1st term

== By-election ==
Members elected in by-elections
District	Member	Date	Reason
Quttiktuq	Rebekah Williams	December 4, 2000	Resignation of Levi Barnabas
Nanulik	Patterk Netser	September 2, 2003	Resignation of James Arvaluk
