= List of premiers of Nunavut =

The Canadian territory of Nunavut was formed on April 1, 1999, through the Nunavut Act and the Nunavut Land Claims Agreement Act. Nunavut, since its formation, has had a consensus government. In a consensus government, the premier is elected by the non-partisan members of the Legislative Assembly. Prior to April 1, 1999, the land that Nunavut occupies was part of the Northwest Territories.

== History ==
The territory's first premier, Paul Okalik, was elected after the 1999 general election. He was re-elected to a second term after the 2004 general election. Although Okalik was re-elected to a third term after the 2008 general election in the Iqaluit West riding, he was defeated by newly elected MLA Eva Aariak in the premiership vote on November 14. On November 15, 2013, Peter Taptuna beat out Paul Okalik and Paul Quassa for the position of premier.

== Premiers of Nunavut ==
No.	Portrait	Name (Birth–Death)	Term of office	Electoral mandates (Assembly)	Political party	Parliamentary seat
1		Paul Okalik (b. 1964)	1 April 1999 – 19 November 2008	1999 election (1st Leg.) 2004 election (2nd Leg.)	Non-partisan	MLA for Iqaluit West
2		Eva Aariak (b. 1955)	19 November 2008 – 19 November 2013	2008 election (3rd Leg.)	Non-partisan	MLA for Iqaluit East
3		Peter Taptuna (b. 1956)	19 November 2013 – 21 November 2017	2013 election (4th Leg.)	Non-partisan	MLA for Kugluktuk
4		Paul Quassa (b. 1952)	21 November 2017 – 14 June 2018	2017 election (5th Leg.)	Non-partisan	MLA for Aggu
5		Joe Savikataaq (b. 1960)	14 June 2018 – 19 November 2021	Appointment (5th Leg.)	Non-partisan	MLA for Arviat South
6		P.J. Akeeagok (b. 1984)	19 November 2021 – 20 November 2025	2021 election (6th Leg.)	Non-partisan	MLA for Iqaluit-Niaqunnguu
6		P.J. Akeeagok (b. 1984)	Signing of the Nunavut Lands and Resources Devolution Agreement			
7		John Main (b. 1980)	20 November 2025 – incumbent	2025 election (7th Leg.)	Non-partisan	MLA for Arviat North-Whale Cove
7		John Main (b. 1980)	First non-Inuk premier			

== See also ==
- Premier of Nunavut
- List of Nunavut general elections
- Legislative Assembly of Nunavut
