= Speaker of the Legislative Assembly of Nunavut =

Canadian territorial legislative officer

The Speaker of the Legislative Assembly of Nunavut is the presiding officer of the territorial legislature in Nunavut, Canada. Since 1999 the position has been elected by Members of the Legislative Assembly (MLAs) using a secret ballot. The current speaker is David Joanasie.

== The office of the Speaker ==
As the politics of Nunavut are run under a Westminster system, the role of the Speaker of the Legislative Assembly in Nunavut is very similar to that of the Speaker of the House of Commons of the United Kingdom, the Speaker of the House of Commons of Canada and the Speakers of the various other Canadian legislatures. The Speaker is responsible for enforcing the Rules of the Legislative Assembly, and indeed the responsibilities of this office are also set out by these Rules. The Speaker is also the Chairperson of the Management and Services Board, which is tasked with the administration of the Legislative Assembly Precinct and the Office of the Legislative Assembly.

The Speaker is elected on the first sitting day of the Assembly following a general election. Business may not commence before a Speaker is elected. The Speaker holds a casting vote should any vote of Members of the Legislative Assembly result in a tie, and should the Speaker be unable to act, the Deputy Speaker may act in his or her place. Decisions of the Speaker are not subject to debate or appeal.

The former Speaker, Hunter Tootoo, was elected by MLAs on June 1, 2011. Tootoo, who was most recently Nunavut's Minister for Education prior to taking up his new role, is the longest-serving Member of the Nunavut Legislative Assembly, and the only Member who was present in the first Assembly, opened in 1999.

== List of speakers ==
Speaker of the Legislative Assembly
District	Member	Years as Speaker
Quttiktuq	Levi Barnabas^{A} ^{B}	1999–2000
Arviat	Kevin O'Brien	2000–2004
Tununiq	Jobie Nutarak^{C}	2004–2006
Pangnirtung	Peter Kilabuk	2006–2008
Uqqummiut	James Arreak	2008–2010
Iqaluit West	Paul Okalik	2010–2011
Iqaluit Centre	Hunter Tootoo	2011–2013
Amittuq	George Qulaut	2013–2017
Tununiq	Joe Enook^{D}	2017–2019
Baker Lake	Simeon Mikkungwak	2019–2020
Aggu	Paul Quassa	2020–2021
Hudson Bay	Allan Rumbolt	2021
Gjoa Haven	Tony Akoak	2021–2025
South Baffin	David Joanasie	2025–present

Notes:

- ^A Levi Barnabas was convicted of sexual assault in 2000.
- ^B Uriash Puqiqnak briefly served as acting speaker after Barnabas' resignation.
- ^C Jobie Nutarak died in a snowmobile accident in 2006.
- ^D Joe Enook died in office due to illness.
