= 3rd Nunavut Legislature =

Legislature of Nunavut, 2008–2013

- Consensus parliament
- Nov. 14, 2008 – Sep. 23, 2013

Parliament leaders
- Premier: Eva Aariak; November 14, 2008 - November 19, 2013
- Members: 22 seats

Sovereign
- Monarch: Elizabeth II; February 6, 1952 – September 8, 2022
- Commissioner: Ann Meekitjuk Hanson; April 21, 2005 - April 10, 2010
- Nellie Kusugak (acting); April 10, 2010 - May 31, 2010
- Edna Elias; May 31, 2010 - May 12, 2015
← 2nd	→ 4th

The 3rd Nunavut Legislature began after the 2008 general election on October 27. The election returned 17 of the 19 non-partisan members with two deferred for other days. The last member returned in the general election in the Akulliq district on March 2, 2009.

== Change of Premier ==
After the election the Legislative Assembly of Nunavut met and voted in a new premier. Eva Aariak defeated incumbent Paul Okalik to become the second premier in the history of the territory.

== Membership in the 3rd assembly ==
A list of members returned in the 2008 general election and subsequent deferred elections.

=== Members elected in the 3rd general election ===
Member	Riding	First elected / previously elected	No. of terms
Steve Mapsalak	Akulliq	2004	2nd term
John Ningark (2009)	Akulliq	1989, 2009	4th term*
Louis Tapardjuk	Amittuq	2004	2nd term
Daniel Shewchuk	Arviat	2008	1st term
Moses Aupaluktuq	Baker Lake	2008	1st term
Keith Peterson	Cambridge Bay	2004	2nd term
Allan Rumbolt	Hudson Bay	2008	1st term
Hunter Tootoo	Iqaluit Centre	1999	3rd term
Eva Aariak	Iqaluit East	2008	1st term
Paul Okalik	Iqaluit West	1999	3rd term
Monica Ell-Kanayuk (2011)	Iqaluit West	2011	1st term
Peter Taptuna	Kugluktuk	2008	1st term
Johnny Ningeongan	Nanulik	2008	1st term
Enuk Pauloosie	Nattilik	2008	1st term
Jeannie Ugyuk (2010)	Nattilik	2010	1st term
Adamee Komoartok	Pangnirtung	2008	1st term
Hezakiah Oshutapik (2011)	Pangnirtung	2011	1st term
Ron Elliott	Quttiktuq	2008	1st term
Tagak Curley	Rankin Inlet North	1979, (Note: Keewatin South/Aivilik (NWT)) 2004	4th term*
Lorne Kusugak	Rankin Inlet South/Whale Cove	2008	1st term
Fred Schell	South Baffin	2008	1st term
James Arvaluk	Tununiq	1991, (Note: Aivilik (NWT)) 1999, (Note: Nanulik) 2006	4th term*
Joe Enook (2011)	Tununiq	2011	1st term
James Arreak	Uqqummiut	1979, 2004	3rd term*

== Membership changes ==
Date	Member	Riding	Reason
October 27, 2008	See list of members		Election day of the 3rd Nunavut general election with 17 of 19 members returned.
November 3, 2008	Fred Schell	South Baffin	Elected in a deferred election, 18th member returned.
March 2, 2009	John Ningark	Akulliq	Elected in a deferred election, 19th member returned.
February 22, 2010	Enuk Pauloosie	Nattilik	Vacated seat
April 26, 2010	Jeannie Ugyuk	Nattilik	Elected in a by-election
March 15, 2011	Adamee Komoartok	Pangnirtung	Vacated seat
April 6, 2011	Paul Okalik	Iqaluit West	Vacated seat to run in the 2011 Canadian federal election
May 16, 2011	James Arvaluk	Tununiq	Vacated seat for health reasons.
September 12, 2011	Monica Ell-Kanayuk	Iqaluit West	Elected in a by-election
September 12, 2011	Joe Enook	Tununiq	Elected in a by-election
September 12, 2011	Hezakiah Oshutapik	Pangnirtung	Elected in a by-election
