= 2004 Nunavut general election =

Canadian territorial election

- February 16, 2004

19 seats in the Legislative Assembly of Nunavut
- Turnout: 88.9% (▲0.3pp)
Premier before election
Paul Okalik
Premier after election
Paul Okalik

The 2004 Nunavut general election was held on February 16, 2004, to elect the 19 members of the 2nd Legislative Assembly of Nunavut.

Premier Paul Okalik asked for the five-year-old territory's first parliament to be dissolved on January 16.

The territory operates on a consensus government system with no political parties; the premier is subsequently chosen by and from the MLAs. There were 11,285 registered voters at the time of the election call.

== Issues ==
Issues at the election included:

- the size of the civil service;
- the territory's Human Rights Act;
- education;
- language and culture.

== Results ==
Elections were held in 18 of the 19 electoral districts. Rankin Inlet North acclaimed its MLA. The following is a list of the districts with their candidates.

District	Incumbent	Elected	Percentage	Defeated candidates
Akulliq	Ovide Alakannuark	Steve Mapsalak	34.86%	George Bohlender, Joani Kringayark, John Ningark, Roland Tungilik
Amittuq	Enoki Irqittuq	Louis Tapardjuk	39.63%	Solomon Allurut, Enoki Irqittuq
Arviat	Kevin O'Brien	David Alagalak	36.53%	Peter Alareak, Peter Two Aulatjut, Kevin O'Brien, Jay Saint, Kono Tattuinee
Baker Lake	Glenn McLean	David Simailak	48.22%	David Aksawnee, Becky Kudloo, David Toolooktook Sr.
Cambridge Bay	Kelvin Ng	Keith Peterson	54.09%	Harry Ambrose M. Aknavigak, David Kaosoni, Harry Maksagak
Hudson Bay	Peter Kattuk	Peter Kattuk	42.76%	Moses Appaqaq, Joe Arragutainaq, Kupapik Ningeocheak, Johnny Tookalook
Iqaluit Centre	Hunter Tootoo	Hunter Tootoo	44.8%	Natsiq Alainga-Kango, Mike Courtney, Kevin MacCormack, Pauloosie Paniloo, Mary Ellen Thomas
Iqaluit East	Ed Picco	Ed Picco	70.68%	John Amagoalik, Norman Ishulutak
Iqaluit West	Paul Okalik	Paul Okalik	76.99%	Doug Workman
Kugluktuk	Donald Havioyak	Joe Allen Evyagotailak	40.41%	Donald Havioyak, Millie Kuliktana
Nanulik	Patterk Netser	Patterk Netser	34.92%	Emily Beardsall, Willy Nakoolak, Bernard Putulik Sr.
Nattilik	Uriash Puqiqnak	Leona Aglukkaq	42.84%	Tom Akoak, Anthony Anguttitauruq, David Irqiut, Simon Qingnaqtuq, Sonny Porter, Ruediger H.J. Rasch
Pangnirtung	Peter Kilabuk	Peter Kilabuk	61.87%	Simeonie Keenainak
Quttiktuq	Rebekah Williams	Levi Barnabas	43.94%	Lucas Amagoalik, Pauloosie Attagootak, Larry Audlaluk, Anthony Ullikatar, Rebekah Williams
Rankin Inlet North	Jack Anawak	Tagak Curley	acclaimed	none
Rankin Inlet South/Whale Cove	Manitok Thompson	Levinia Brown	38.87%	Jerry Ell, Percy Kabloona, Ishmael Naulalik, Solomon Voisey
South Baffin	Olayuk Akesuk	Olayuk Akesuk	58.94%	Malicktoo Lyta, Martha Lyta
Tununiq	Jobie Nutarak	Jobie Nutarak	31.84%	Appitaq Enuaraq, Sam Omik, David Qajaakuttuk Qamaniq
Uqqummiut	David Iqaqrialu	James Arreak	27.06%	Stevie Audlakiak, Phoebe Palluq Hainnu, Peter Iqalukjuak, David Iqaqrialu, Samuel Nuqingaq, Lootie Toomasie

Source: Results (CBC News)

In the main, Nunavummiut decided to stay with their present legislature. The premier, four cabinet ministers, and three other MLAs were re-elected; five incumbents were defeated, including former speaker of the house Kevin O'Brien. Only two women were elected to the 19-seat legislature.

Premier Paul Okalik was given a firm endorsement by the voters in his riding. He faced a strong challenge for the premier's job from Tagak Curley, who was acclaimed to his seat. However, Okalik was returned to the premiership on March 5, 2004, by the new legislature.

== Miscellaneous ==
For the first time, residents of several tiny, isolated communities were able to vote by satellite phone.

Voter turnout was nearly 90%; in 8 of the 18 ridings it was higher than 100% (as high as 134% in Kugluktuk) since there was no door-to-door enumeration and voter registration is permitted at the polling station. As of 2025, this is the only election in which voter turnout increased from the previous election.
