= 1999 Nunavut general election =

Canadian territorial election

- February 15, 1999

19 seats in the Legislative Assembly of Nunavut
- Turnout: 88.6%
Premier
(New office)
Paul Okalik

The 1999 Nunavut general election was the first general election in the territory and was held on February 15, 1999, to elect the members of the 1st Legislative Assembly of Nunavut.

Although Nunavut did not become a territory until April 1, 1999, the election was held early to enable the members to assume their duties on that date.

The territory operates on a consensus government system with no political parties; the premier is subsequently chosen by and from the MLAs.

Paul Okalik was chosen to be Premier of Nunavut.

== Elected ==
District	Member
Akulliq	Ovide Alakannuark
Amittuq	Enoki Irqittuq
Arviat	Kevin O'Brien
Baker Lake	Glenn McLean
Cambridge Bay	Kelvin Ng
Hudson Bay	Peter Kattuk
Iqaluit Centre	Hunter Tootoo
Iqaluit East	Ed Picco
Iqaluit West	Paul Okalik
Kugluktuk	Donald Havioyak
Nanulik	James Arvaluk
Nattilik	Uriash Puqiqnak
Pangnirtung	Peter Kilabuk
Quttiktuq	Levi Barnabas
Rankin Inlet North	Jack Anawak
Rankin Inlet South/Whale Cove	Manitok Thompson
South Baffin	Olayuk Akesuk
Tunnuniq	Jobie Nutarak
Uqqummiut	David Iqaqrialu

== See also ==
- 1st Legislative Assembly of Nunavut
