= Ron Elliott =

Ron Elliott may refer to:

- Ron Elliott (musician) (born 1943), American musician, composer and producer
- Ron Elliott (politician), Canadian politician
