= Isaac Shooyook =

Canadian Inuk politician

Member of the Legislative Assembly of Nunavut for Quttiktuq
- In office October 28, 2013 – September 24, 2017
- Preceded by: Ron Elliott
- Succeeded by: David Akeeagok

Personal details
- Born: 1939 (age 86–87) near Arctic Bay, Northwest Territories (now Nunavut)
- Party: non-partisan consensus government

Isaac Shooyook is a Canadian Inuk politician from Arctic Bay, Northwest Territories (now Nunavut). He was elected to the Legislative Assembly of Nunavut in the 2013 election. He represented the electoral district of Quttiktuq until his defeat in the 2017 election.
