= Brian Koonoo =

Canadian politician

The Honourable Brian Koonoo MLA

Member of the Legislative Assembly of Nunavut for Tununiq
- Incumbent
- Assumed office October 27, 2025
- Preceded by: Karen Nutarak

Member of the Executive Council of Nunavut
- In office November 20, 2025 – November 2, 2026

Personal details
- Party: Non-partisan consensus government

Brian Koonoo is a Canadian politician, who was elected to the Legislative Assembly of Nunavut in the 2025 Nunavut general election. He represents the electoral district of Tununiq. He was appointed to the cabinet as the minister of energy, environment, languages, culture and heritage. He resigned from the minister position on November 2, 2026, stating that his family had a hard time adjusting to live in Iqaluit and he missed hunting in his hometown.

== Life ==
Koonoo holds a diploma in environmental technology program from Nunavut Arctic College. He has published several books about the Arctic.

Koonoo is a recently retired employee of Parks Canada, having worked as a resource management officer for over 20 years.

He is married to his wife Samantha. They have six children.

== Electoral Record ==
2025 Nunavut general election: Tununiq
Candidate	Votes	%
Brian Koonoo	194	50.52
Verna Strickland	109	28.39
David Qamaniq	78	20.31
Eligible voters		792
Total valid ballots		381
Rejected ballots		3
Turnout		48.48%
