= Karen Nutarak =

Canadian politician

Member of the Legislative Assembly of Nunavut for Tununiq
- In office November 19, 2021 – September 22, 2025
- Preceded by: David Qamaniq
- Succeeded by: Brian Koonoo

Personal details
- Party: Non-partisan consensus government

Karen Nutarak is a Canadian Inuk politician, who was elected to the Legislative Assembly of Nunavut in the 2021 Nunavut general election. She represented the electoral district of Tununiq until 2025.

== Electoral record ==
2021 Nunavut general election: Tununiq
Candidate	Votes	%
Karen Nutarak	259	55.5
David Qajaakuttuk Qamaniq	146	31.3
Joshua Arreak	62	13.3
Total valid ballots		467
Rejected ballots		5
