= Iqalugaarjuup Nunanga Territorial Park =

Territorial park in Nunavut, Canada

Coordinates: 62°53′52″N 092°10′22″W

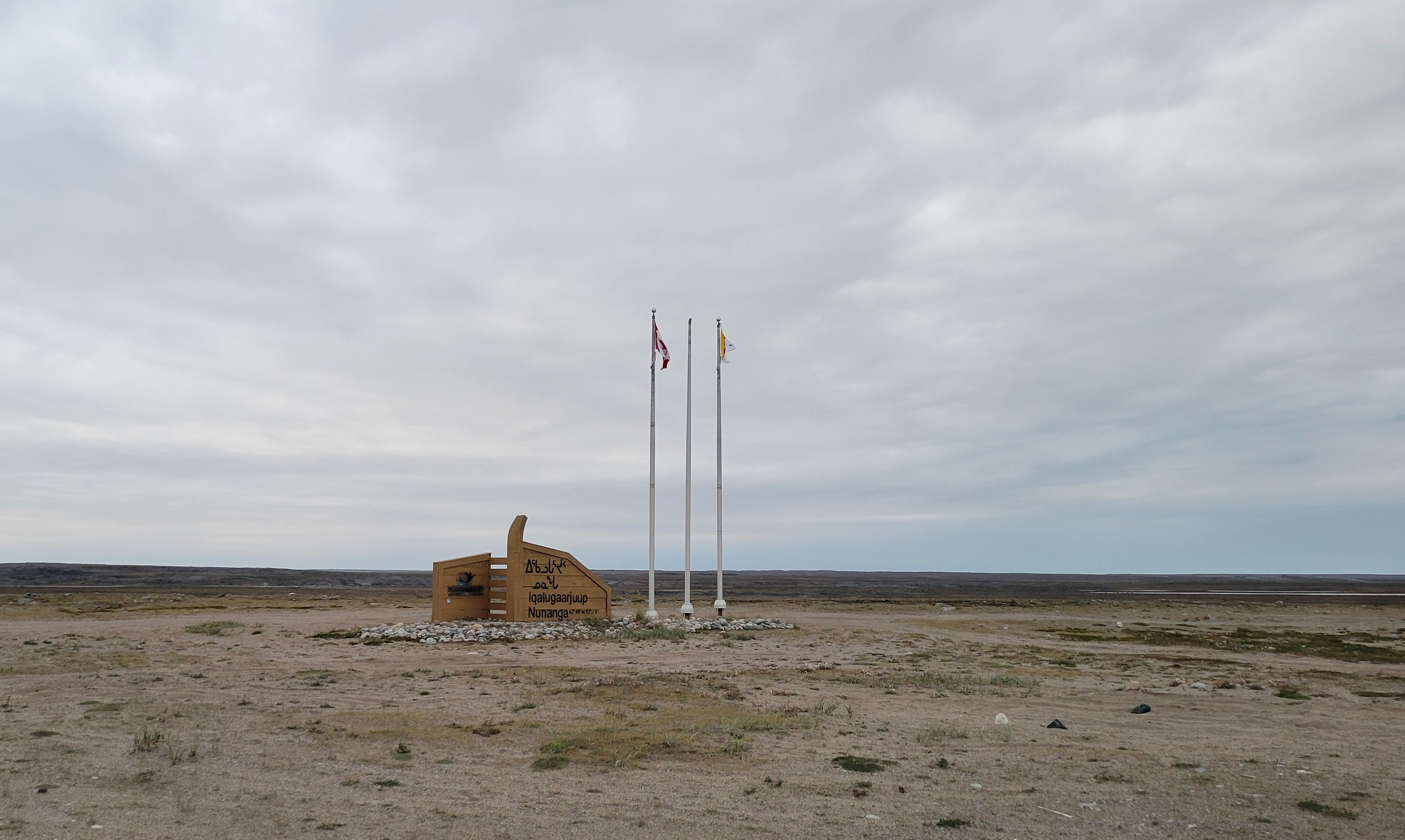
Entrance sign at the park in 2025

Iqalugaarjuup Nunanga Territorial Park ("the land around the river of littles fishes," referring to the Arctic grayling that frequent the Meliadine River) is a park located 8–10 km (5.0–6.2 mi) northwest of Rankin Inlet, Nunavut, Canada. The park lies in a valley that straddles the Meliadine River. Rankin Inlet's gravel road provides access to the park directly on the south side by foot or vehicle.

The park was previously referred to as Ijiraliq, a reference to both the river's cliff area and, in Inuit legend, ijirait, or "shadow people" (said to live a parallel existence with modern people, they can shift their shapes and vanish at will). The park's physical features include an esker covered by lichen-moss, glacial deposit, bedrock outcrop, and unusual plants, including three-awned grass, found nowhere else in Kivalliq Region. There are more than 45 archaeological sites within the park and these include house ruins, tent rings, graves, and other remains of the Thule. Some of the ruins date back as far as the Pre-Dorset period from 1000 BC to 500 BC.

The main archaeological feature is Qamaviniqtalik ("place with ancient sod houses"). Qamaviniqtalik was occupied from around 1200 to 1775 CE by the Thule, and later by the Caribou Inuit. It was used seasonally, from late summer through early winter. At Qamaviniqtalik, there are house depressions in the hillside, evidence of the sod houses or qarmat which once existed there. A wooden pole supported the roof of each house, which was dug into the ground, lined with stones, and roofed with skins. Such sod houses would have been occupied in fall and early winter, after which residents would move to snowhouses or igluit on the sea ice by mid-winter. There are also rings of stones which once supported caribou-skin tents, along with several small stone hearths used to support soapstone cooking pots. A "kayak garage" for winter storage of kayaks, kayak cradles for drying kayaks after use in the water, stone fox traps, and stone caribou hunting blinds are also features preserved at Qamaviniqtalik.
