= Levinia Brown =

Canadian politician

Levinia Nuqaalaq Brown

MLA for Rankin Inlet South/Whale Cove
- In office 2004–2008
- Preceded by: Manitok Thompson
- Succeeded by: Lorne Kusugak

Personal details
- Born: 1947 (age 78–79) Dawson Inlet, Nunavut
- Party: non-partisan consensus government

Levinia Nuqaalaq Brown (born in 1947 at Dawson Inlet, south of Whale Cove, Nunavut) is a Canadian Inuk politician who served as the Member of the Legislative Assembly (MLA) for the electoral district of Rankin Inlet South/Whale Cove in the Legislative Assembly of Nunavut from 2004 to 2008. She was elected as a MLA on February 16, 2004, and further elected by other MLAs to serve on the Executive Council of Nunavut. Premier Paul Okalik named her as the Deputy Premier on March 9, 2004. She also served as the territory's Minister of Community and Government Services.

Prior to becoming an MLA, Brown was the first female mayor of Rankin Inlet, served on the hamlet's council, and helped set up the Eastern Arctic Teacher Education Program, now the Nunavut Teacher Education Program. Outside of politics, she has worked as a Northwest Territories Classroom Assistant and a Certified Nursing Assistant, as well as local housing and education agencies. She speaks Inuktitut.

== Political career ==
=== Rankin Inlet ===
Beginning at least in 1995, Brown was on the hamlet council for Rankin Inlet. She made a comment that voters needed more information before voting on sale of lands vs. continuing to lease lands from the hamlet, a sentiment echoed by nearby leaders. During the creation of Nunavut in 1999, she gave an interview to CBC Radio to give southern listeners an idea into the event's importance. In 2000, after an election season that saw 15 women serving on Kivalliq Region councils as opposed to a previous 3 total, she stated that she was happy to see women seek office and that it was important to have representation for women, elders, and youth, at all levels in the government.

Brown was the first female mayor of Rankin Inlet. On one occasion, she spoke with the Inuit Broadcasting Corporation about "the damage that has been done by the mining industry in" the hamlet.

=== Legislative Assembly of Nunavut ===
On February 16, 2004, Brown was elected to represent Rankin Inlet South/Whale Cove in the Legislative Assembly of Nunavut. She was further elected by other MLAs to serve on the Executive Council of Nunavut, and was then named as Deputy Premier by Premier Paul Okalik on March 9. During her term, she emphasized "the need to combine social reform, economic development and community empowerment to improve the overall health and well-being of" the territory and was the Minister of Health and Social Services.

In 2006, Premier Okalik, Education Minister Ed Picco, and Brown made an announcement in Rankin Island that the area would soon receive funding to create a trade school as part of the Nunavut Arctic College to provide more career training opportunities for the area. It is now known as Sanatuliqsarvik, or the Nunavut Trades Training Centre.

In 2008, Brown lost re-election to Rankin Inlet mayor Lorne Kusugak, who won with 62% of the popular vote vs. Brown's 38%, in an election that saw 10 out of 15 of the Legislative Assembly's open seats go to newcomers over incumbents.

== Post-Assembly work ==
In 2016, Brown ran for president of the Nunavut Tunngavik Incorporated (NTI) with a platform emphasizing the elderly, food prices, financial transparency, and employment. Low NTI beneficiary voter turnout and beneficiary questions about the closure of benefits programs were two other concerns she named. She described a problem with a lack of elderly care services in the region, with elders instead being sent to southern territories where there were more services but non-traditional diets and no nearby family members. For the youth, she suggested meeting with the local government, federal government, and Inuit Tapiriit Kanatami to see options, as well as getting the youth involved. For unemployment, she proposed training for NTI beneficiaries at higher levels, not just service staff like kitchen workers and janitors, and also proposed looking into a road from Manitoba to Nunavut to create jobs and lower food prices.

Brown admitted in 2019 that she originally did not support the creation of Nunavut for various reasons, but "admired the determination of those who were in favour of division" and eventually became glad the territory had its own government. She also stated that poverty in housing was a continuing problem for the area, especially considering overcrowding and mould. She also noted that the region needed more range in medical equipment and facilities, as medical travel and emergency medical evacuation were considerably expensive. She stated that she would like to see proportional Inuit representation in government in the future (85% vs. the current 50%).

In 2020, Brown was appointed a member of the National Centre for Truth and Reconciliation's (NCTR) Governing Circle.

== Personal life ==
Brown was delivered by her father in 1947 at Dawson Inlet, south of Whale Cove, Nunavut, since "there were no nurses, doctors, or government services in that area." As a child, she celebrated Christmas with gifts from relatives, southern made or Inuit clothing (often kamiks from Inuit relatives), and would attend mass at the local mission church, joined by others who traveled there by dog sled from local camps. After the church's dinner, they participated in "games and races outdoors, with coveted prizes including big 10-pound bags of flour and sugar, packaged in white-and-red or burlap bags" that would be repurposed as household items such as tea towels after they were emptied.

Brown attended the Sir Joseph Bernier federal school Chesterfield Inlet as a day student and was not allowed to speak Inuktitut. She also attended school in Churchill, Manitoba, before working as Rankin Inlet's first teaching aid and then graduating from The Pas's St. Anthony Hospital in as a Certified Nursing Assistant and working as one in several territories.

In 1978, Brown became certified as a Northwest Territories Classroom Assistant and played an important role in creating an Eastern Arctic Teacher Education Program in Iqaluit. Two years later, she became the first chair of the Keewatin Regional Education Authority. At some point before she became the first female mayor of Rankin Inlet, she also chaired the local housing authority, worked as an information officer, and served as deputy mayor.

Brown is married to Ron Brown and has 10 children, 3 of whom are custom adopted.
