= Rankin Inlet =

Rankin Inlet Kangiqtiniq ᑲᖏᖅᖠᓂᕐᒥ (Inuktitut)
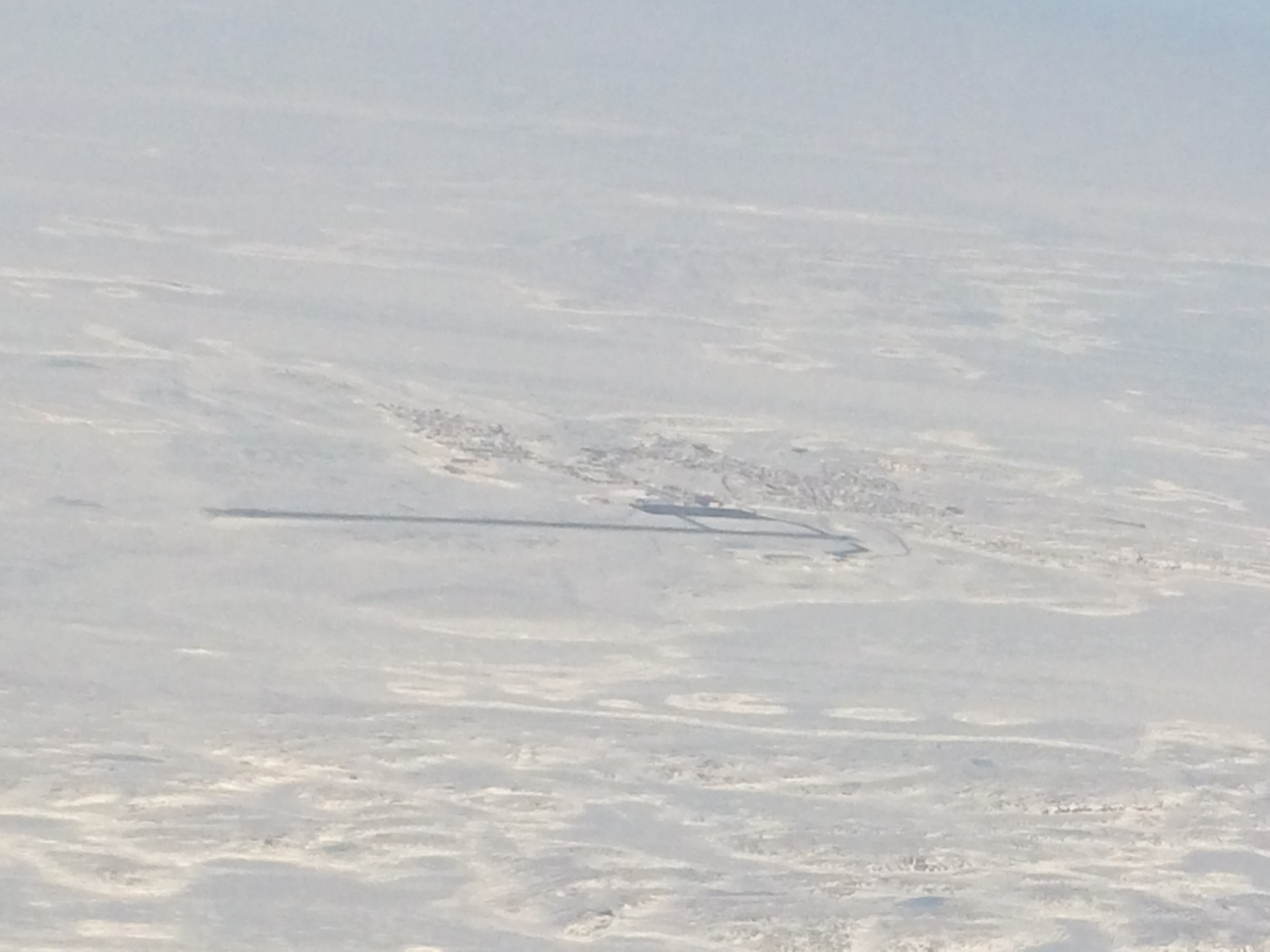
- Rankin Inlet from the air

- Location within Nunavut Location within Canada
- Coordinates: 62°49′N 092°05′W
- Country: Canada
- Territory: Nunavut
- Region: Kivalliq
- Electoral districts: Rankin Inlet North-Chesterfield Inlet; Rankin Inlet South

Government
  - Type: Hamlet Council
  - Mayor: Harry Towtongie
  - MLAs: Alexander Sammurtok; Annie Tattuinee

Area (2021)
  - Total: 20.03 km^{2} (7.73 sq mi)
  - Population centre: 2.86 km^{2} (1.10 sq mi)
- Elevation: 28 m (92 ft)

Population (2021)
  - Total: 2,975
  - Density: 148.5/km^{2} (385/sq mi)
  - Population centre: 2,698
  - Population centre density: 942.6/km^{2} (2,441/sq mi)
- Time zone: UTC−06:00 (CST)
  - Summer (DST): UTC−05:00 (CDT)
- Canadian Postal code: X0C 0G0
- Area code: 867
- Telephone Exchange: 645
- GNBC Code: OANSI
- NTS Map: 55K16 Rankin Inlet
- Waterway: Hudson Bay
- Website: https://rankininlet.ca/

Rankin Inlet (Inuktitut: ᑲᖏᖅᖠᓂᕐᒥ, romanized: Kangiqtiniq), which fronts to Hudson Bay, is an Inuit hamlet on the Kudlulik Peninsula in Nunavut, Canada. It is the largest hamlet and second-largest settlement in Nunavut after the territorial capital, Iqaluit. Rankin Inlet is the regional centre for the Kivalliq Region. It is also the largest settlement in mainland Nunavut.

In the 1995 Nunavut capital plebiscite, voters chose Iqaluit over Rankin Inlet to become the territorial capital of Nunavut, with roughly 40% of voters voting for Rankin Inlet.

== Inuktitut ==
Rankin Inlet is also known in Inuktitut as Inuktitut: Kangiqiniq; Inuktitut syllabics: ᑲᖏᕿᓂᖅ or Kangirliniq, ᑲᖏᖅᖠᓂᖅ, or Kangir&iniq meaning deep bay/inlet.

== History ==
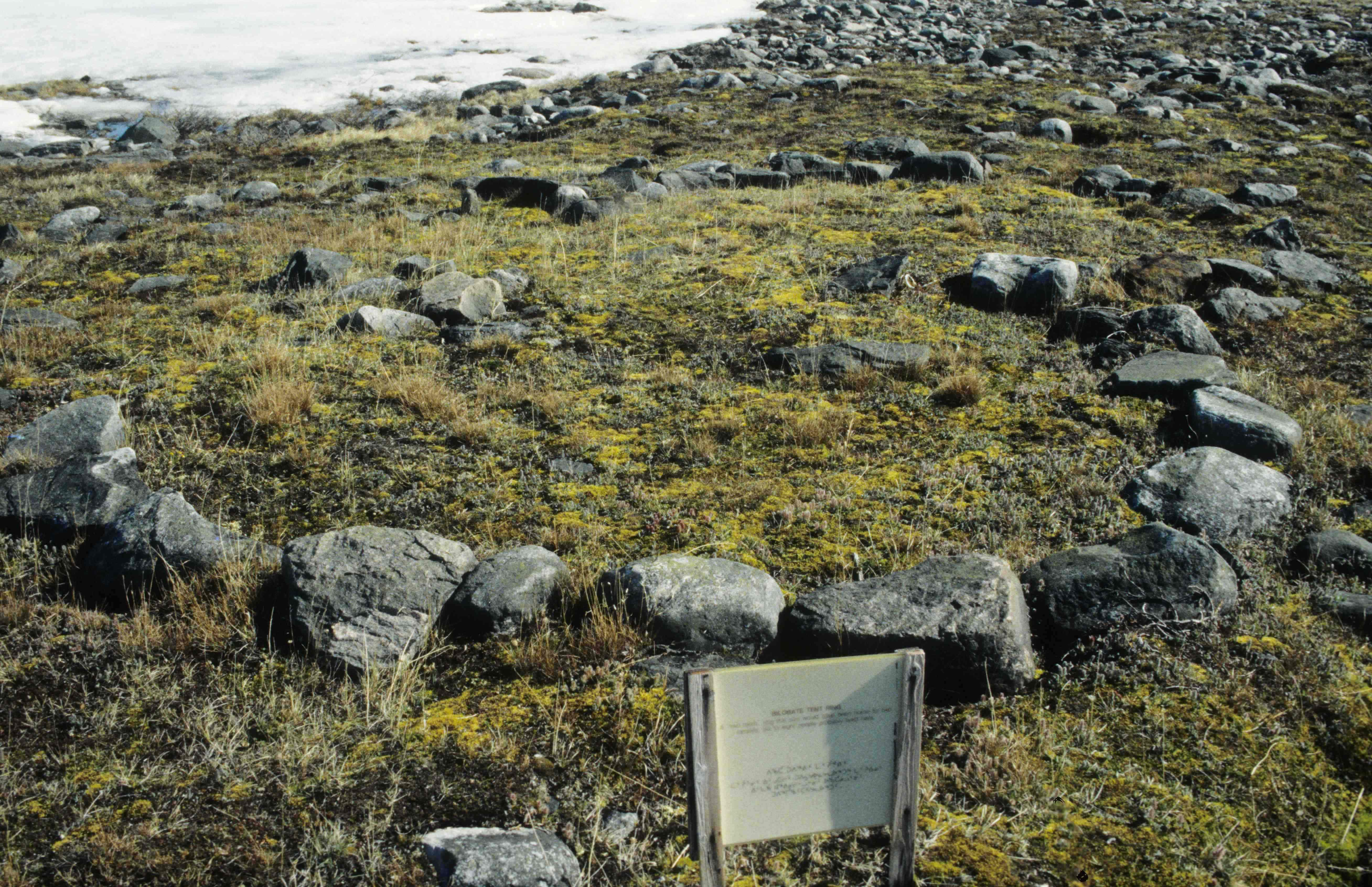
A Thule site at the Meliadine River near Rankin Inlet

Archaeological sites suggest the area was inhabited around 1200 CE by Thule people who were bowhead whale hunters. By the late 18th century, they were succeeded by Kivallirmiut (Caribou Inuit) who hunted the inland barren-ground caribou, and fished for Arctic char along the coast, as well as the Diane River and Meliadine River. The Hudson's Bay Company (HBC) established itself throughout the bay in the 17th century, and after 1717, sloops from Churchill, Manitoba traded north to Rankin Inlet and beyond. There was an unfortunate expedition shipwrecked on Marble Island, 32 km (20 mi) east of Rankin Inlet: James Knight's expedition died on the island around 1722. It was surveyed by William Moor in 1747. HBC contact was followed in the mid-19th century by American and European whalers, who were followed by fur traders trapping Arctic foxes for their skins in the early 20th century, followed by missionaries who brought a written language system.

The town itself was founded by the owners of the Rankin Inlet Mine, just north of Johnston Cove. Starting in 1957, the mine produced nickel and copper ores from an underground operation. The mine was the first case of Inuit miners in Canada. When the mine closed in 1962, Rankin Inlet had a population of approximately 500 Inuit, and 70-80% had been mine workers. Several unsuccessful attempts followed to develop alternate sources of income for the town. These included a pig ranch in 1969 and a chicken-raising venture in the 1970s. Both animal groups were fed a diet of local fish, which gave the meat an unpleasant flavour. It was also common for the animals to freeze to death or be eaten by polar bears.

The Meliadine Gold Mine operated by Agnico Eagle opened in 2019 and is expected to produce until at least 2032. It is the second mine opened in the low Arctic, after the Meadowbank Gold Mine, and is both an underground and open-pit mine.

From 1985 to 1997, Kivalliq Hall operated as a boarding school for Inuit pupils; it had been recognized as a residential school for the pre-1995 period when it was operated by the Federal government.

Voters chose Iqaluit over Rankin Inlet to become the new territorial capital of Nunavut in the 1995 Nunavut capital plebiscite.

== Demographics ==
Federal census population history of Rankin Inlet
Year	Pop.	±%
1971	566	—
1976	852	+50.5%
1981	1,109	+30.2%
1986	1,374	+23.9%
1991	1,706	+24.2%
1996	2,058	+20.6%
2001	2,177	+5.8%
2006	2,358	+8.3%
2011	2,557	+8.4%
2016	2,842	+11.1%
2021	2,975	+4.7%
Source: Statistics Canada

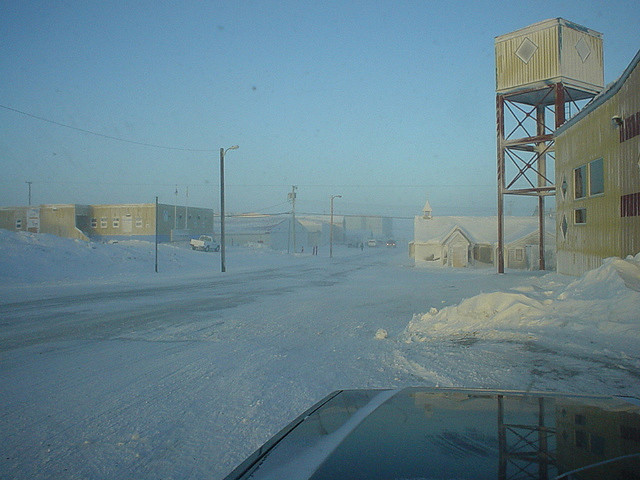
Downtown Rankin Inlet

In the 2021 Canadian census conducted by Statistics Canada, Rankin Inlet had a population of 2,975 living in 826 of its 1,026 total private dwellings, a change of 4.7% from its 2016 population of 2,842. With a land area of 20.03 km^{2} (7.73 sq mi), it had a population density of 148.5/km^{2} (384.7/sq mi) in 2021.

Panethnic groups in the Hamlet of Rankin Inlet (2001−2021)
Panethnic group	2021		2016		2011		2006		2001	
Panethnic group	Pop.	%	Pop.	%	Pop.	%	Pop.	%	Pop.	%
Indigenous	2,525	86.18%	2,320	83.6%	1,835	81.74%	1,955	83.55%	1,720	79.45%
European (Note: Statistic includes all persons that did not make up part of a visible minority or an indigenous identity.)	275	9.39%	345	12.43%	310	13.81%	325	13.89%	405	18.71%
Southeast Asian (Note: Statistic includes total responses of "Filipino" and "Southeast Asian" under visible minority section on census.)	55	1.88%	60	2.16%	65	2.9%	25	1.07%	20	0.92%
African	35	1.19%	20	0.72%	20	0.89%	20	0.85%	10	0.46%
South Asian	30	1.02%	20	0.72%	20	0.89%	0	0%	10	0.46%
East Asian (Note: Statistic includes total responses of "Chinese", "Korean", and "Japanese" under visible minority section on census.)	0	0%	0	0%	0	0%	10	0.43%	10	0.46%
Middle Eastern (Note: Statistic includes total responses of "West Asian" and "Arab" under visible minority section on census.)	0	0%	0	0%	0	0%	10	0.43%	0	0%
Latin American	0	0%	0	0%	0	0%	0	0%	0	0%
Other/multiracial (Note: Statistic includes total responses of "Visible minority, n.i.e." and "Multiple visible minorities" under visible minority section on census.)	10	0.34%	0	0%	10	0.45%	0	0%	0	0%
Total responses	2,930	98.49%	2,775	97.64%	2,245	87.12%	2,340	99.24%	2,165	99.45%
Total population	2,975	100%	2,842	100%	2,577	100%	2,358	100%	2,177	100%
Note: Totals greater than 100% due to multiple origin responses

== Arts and culture ==
Rankin Inlet houses the only Inuit fine-arts ceramics production facility in the world. Community artists work in a variety of media including ceramics, prints, bronze castings, carvings, watercolour and drawing. The Matchbox Gallery, founded in 1987, showcases art work and provides educational resources.

The community is served by Kivalliq News, a weekly newspaper which publishes in both English and Inuktitut.

The annual spring festival Pakallak Tyme includes a fishing competition and snowmobile races.

== Transportation ==
Due to the remoteness of the community and the fact that there is no all-season road to access the community, the primary mode of year-round transportation into and out of the community is by airplane. Three passenger airlines fly into Rankin Inlet Airport: Calm Air and Canadian North, both providing scheduled flights, and Nolinor Aviation, charter only.

Calm Air flies direct to Winnipeg, with round-trip service twice daily on weekdays. Rankin Inlet serves as a hub for transit further into the Kivalliq Region . Destinations from Rankin Inlet include Arviat, Baker Lake, Chesterfield Inlet, Coral Harbour, Naujaat, and Whale Cove.

Canadian North also serves the community, with service to Edmonton, Yellowknife, Iqaluit, and Montreal, on a milk-run that flies very infrequently.

The community is also serviced by sealifts originating from Montreal.

== Broadband communications ==
The community has been served by the Qiniq network since 2005. Qiniq is a fixed wireless service to homes and businesses, connecting to the outside world via a satellite backbone. The Qiniq network is designed and operated by SSi Canada. In 2017, the network was upgraded to 4G LTE technology, and 2G-GSM for mobile voice.

== Geography ==
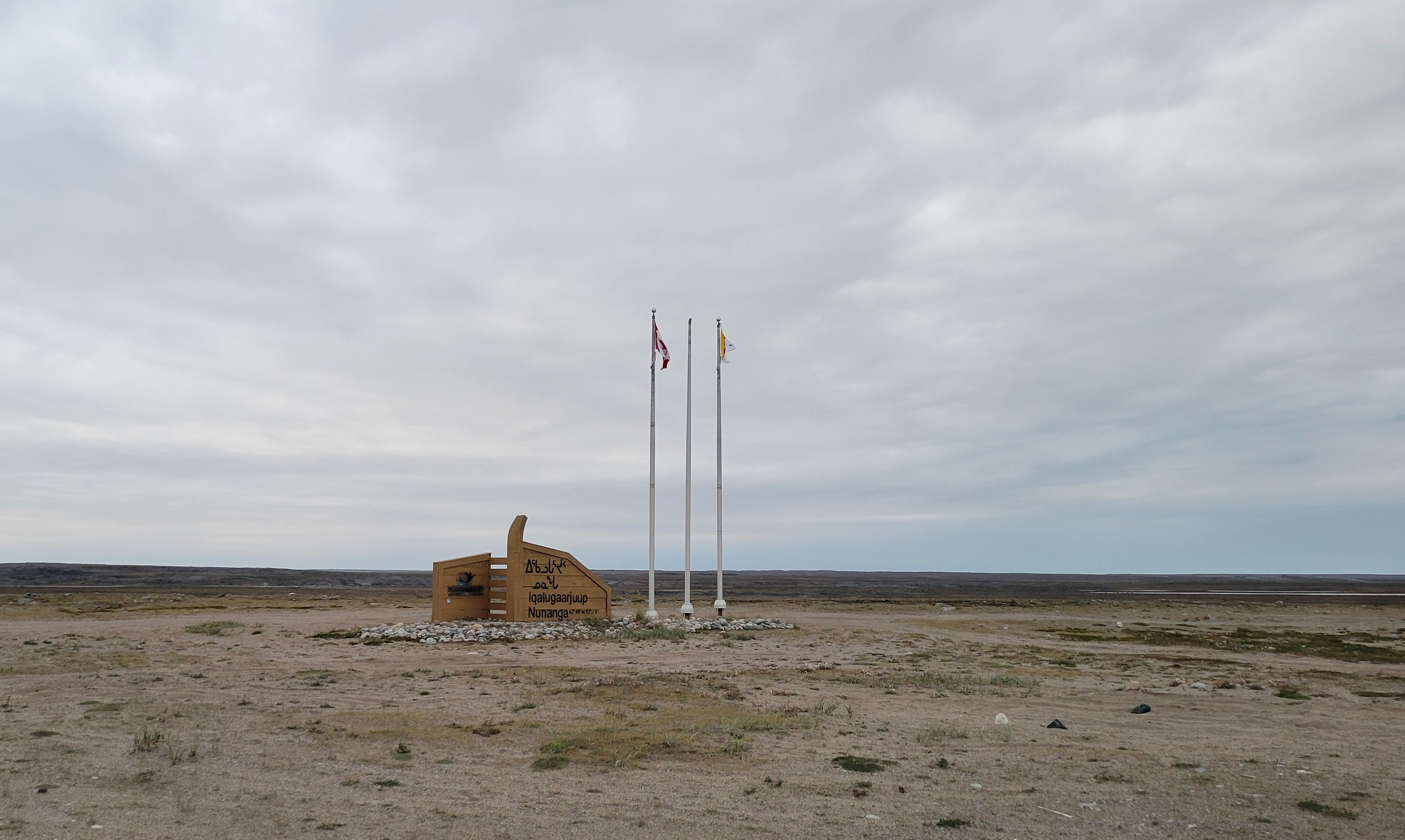
Entrance of Iqalugaarjuup Nunanga Territorial Park in 2025

Rankin Inlet is notable for the chilling wind, severe winter storms, and water resources. The Diana River empties from the north into the hamlet's namesake inlet. The Kivalliq Region has several lakes, the largest being Nipissa Lake, and is flanked by two bays, Melvin Bay on the west and Prairie Bay on the east. Paniqtoq Peninsula, on the inlet's far western shore, provides a barrier shelter for the smaller Kivalliq Region. Dozens of islands dot the inlet, including Thomson Island, the largest, and the Barrier Islands, the longest chain. These natural resources attract tourists who hunt, fish, and canoe. The Iqalugaarjuup Nunanga Territorial Park, 10 km (6.2 mi) northwest of Rankin Inlet, is notable for hiking, fishing, bird watching and Thule archaeological sites.

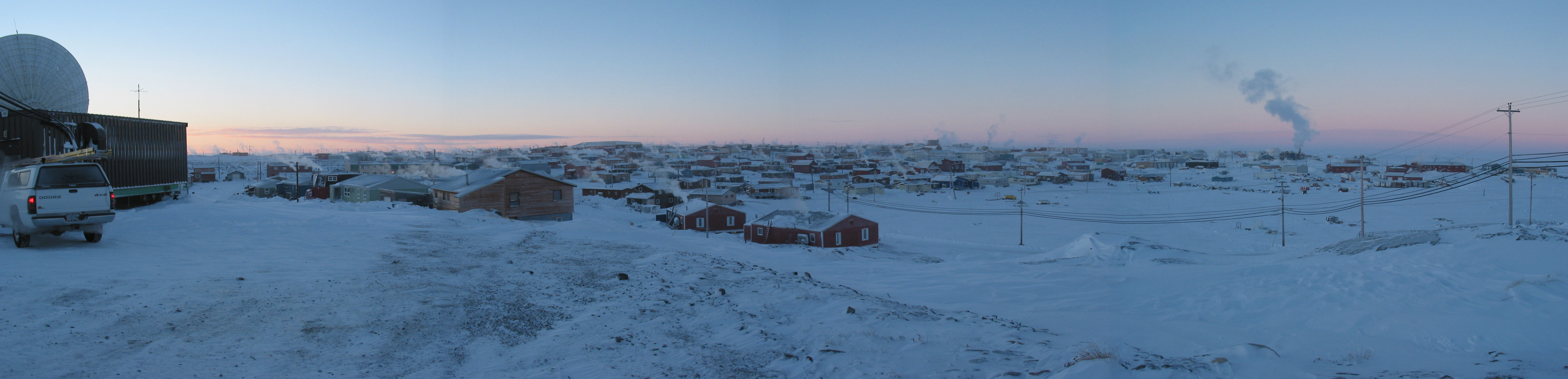
Rankin Inlet

=== Climate ===
Rankin Inlet has a subarctic climate (Köppen: Dfc; Trewartha: Ecld), just short of a tundra climate. It is above the tree line. Temperatures stay below freezing from late September to early June. Although the climate is subarctic, temperatures rise and fall too rapidly and do not stay above 10 °C (50 °F) for long enough (30 days) for trees to grow. Under the alternate formula for determining the boundary between Arctic and subarctic climates posited by Otto Nordenskjöld, however, Rankin Inlet, along with Arviat and Baker Lake, qualify as Arctic based on the relationship between the temperatures of the coldest and warmest months; in the case of Rankin Inlet, with a coldest-month (January) mean of −30.1 °C (−22.2 °F), said boundary for the warmest month would be 12.0 °C (53.6 °F) using the Nordenskjöld formula and Rankin Inlet's warmest month (July) averages only 10.9 °C (51.6 °F).

Beginning on 16 January 2008, Rankin Inlet endured the longest recorded blizzard in Canada. (Note: Environment and Climate Change Canada defines a blizzard above the tree line as a snowstorm with sustained wind speed above 40 km/h (25 mph), visibility 400 m (1,300 ft) or under and conditions will last for at least six hours.) Wind speed was 74 km/h (46 mph) or above, with gusts to 90 km/h (56 mph), and wind chill values were as low as −58 °C (−72 °F). This blizzard lasted 7 days 5 hours.

Climate data for Rankin Inlet (Rankin Inlet Airport) WMO ID: 71083; coordinates 62°49′N 92°07′W; elevation: 32.3 m (106 ft); 1991–2020 normals, extremes 1981–present
Month	Jan	Feb	Mar	Apr	May	Jun	Jul	Aug	Sep	Oct	Nov	Dec	Year
Record high humidex	−3.0	−3.6	1.1	2.5	13.4	27.5	32.2	31.8	23.4	12.7	1.4	0.8	32.2
Record high °C (°F)	−2.5 (27.5)	−3.4 (25.9)	1.3 (34.3)	3.4 (38.1)	14.1 (57.4)	26.8 (80.2)	28.9 (84.0)	30.5 (86.9)	21.0 (69.8)	13.3 (55.9)	1.5 (34.7)	0.9 (33.6)	30.5 (86.9)
Mean daily maximum °C (°F)	−26.6 (−15.9)	−25.8 (−14.4)	−20.3 (−4.5)	−11.1 (12.0)	−2.2 (28.0)	8.4 (47.1)	15.2 (59.4)	13.5 (56.3)	6.7 (44.1)	−1.4 (29.5)	−12.5 (9.5)	−20.7 (−5.3)	−6.4 (20.5)
Daily mean °C (°F)	−30.1 (−22.2)	−29.5 (−21.1)	−24.5 (−12.1)	−15.5 (4.1)	−5.5 (22.1)	4.6 (40.3)	10.9 (51.6)	10.1 (50.2)	4.2 (39.6)	−4.6 (23.7)	−17.0 (1.4)	−25.7 (−14.3)	−10.0 (14.0)
Mean daily minimum °C (°F)	−33.6 (−28.5)	−33.2 (−27.8)	−28.8 (−19.8)	−19.9 (−3.8)	−8.7 (16.3)	0.8 (33.4)	6.6 (43.9)	6.7 (44.1)	1.6 (34.9)	−6.6 (20.1)	−20.3 (−4.5)	−28.2 (−18.8)	−13.6 (7.5)
Record low °C (°F)	−46.1 (−51.0)	−49.8 (−57.6)	−43.4 (−46.1)	−36.1 (−33.0)	−24.6 (−12.3)	−9.4 (15.1)	−1.9 (28.6)	−1.4 (29.5)	−9.0 (15.8)	−27.4 (−17.3)	−36.8 (−34.2)	−43.6 (−46.5)	−49.8 (−57.6)
Record low wind chill	−66.8	−70.5	−64.4	−53.6	−37.8	−17.6	−5.3	−8.8	−18.1	−42.7	−55.3	−62.4	−70.5
Average precipitation mm (inches)	9.6 (0.38)	9.2 (0.36)	12.3 (0.48)	20.6 (0.81)	21.0 (0.83)	22.1 (0.87)	43.7 (1.72)	51.6 (2.03)	47.3 (1.86)	40.1 (1.58)	22.5 (0.89)	16.1 (0.63)	315.9 (12.44)
Average rainfall mm (inches)	0.0 (0.0)	0.0 (0.0)	0.0 (0.0)	1.1 (0.04)	7.3 (0.29)	19.6 (0.77)	43.5 (1.71)	51.6 (2.03)	44.7 (1.76)	14.7 (0.58)	0.5 (0.02)	0.1 (0.00)	183.2 (7.21)
Average snowfall cm (inches)	9.8 (3.9)	9.2 (3.6)	12.3 (4.8)	20.0 (7.9)	14.0 (5.5)	2.2 (0.9)	0.1 (0.0)	0.0 (0.0)	2.6 (1.0)	25.4 (10.0)	22.5 (8.9)	16.5 (6.5)	134.5 (53.0)
Average precipitation days (≥ 0.2 mm)	7.5	6.7	8.5	8.0	8.6	7.1	10.5	12.6	12.7	14.9	12.9	10.8	120.8
Average rainy days (≥ 0.2 mm)	0.08	0.04	0.04	0.75	2.6	6.0	10.5	12.6	10.9	4.4	0.50	0.17	48.6
Average snowy days (≥ 0.2 cm)	7.6	6.8	8.5	7.7	6.9	1.5	0.04	0.04	2.7	12.3	12.9	10.8	77.8
Average relative humidity (%) (at 1500 LST)	68.2	68.7	71.9	78.1	81.0	70.6	65.7	71.2	74.6	84.2	79.2	72.4	73.8
Source: Environment and Climate Change Canada Canadian Climate Normals 1991–2020

== Notable people ==
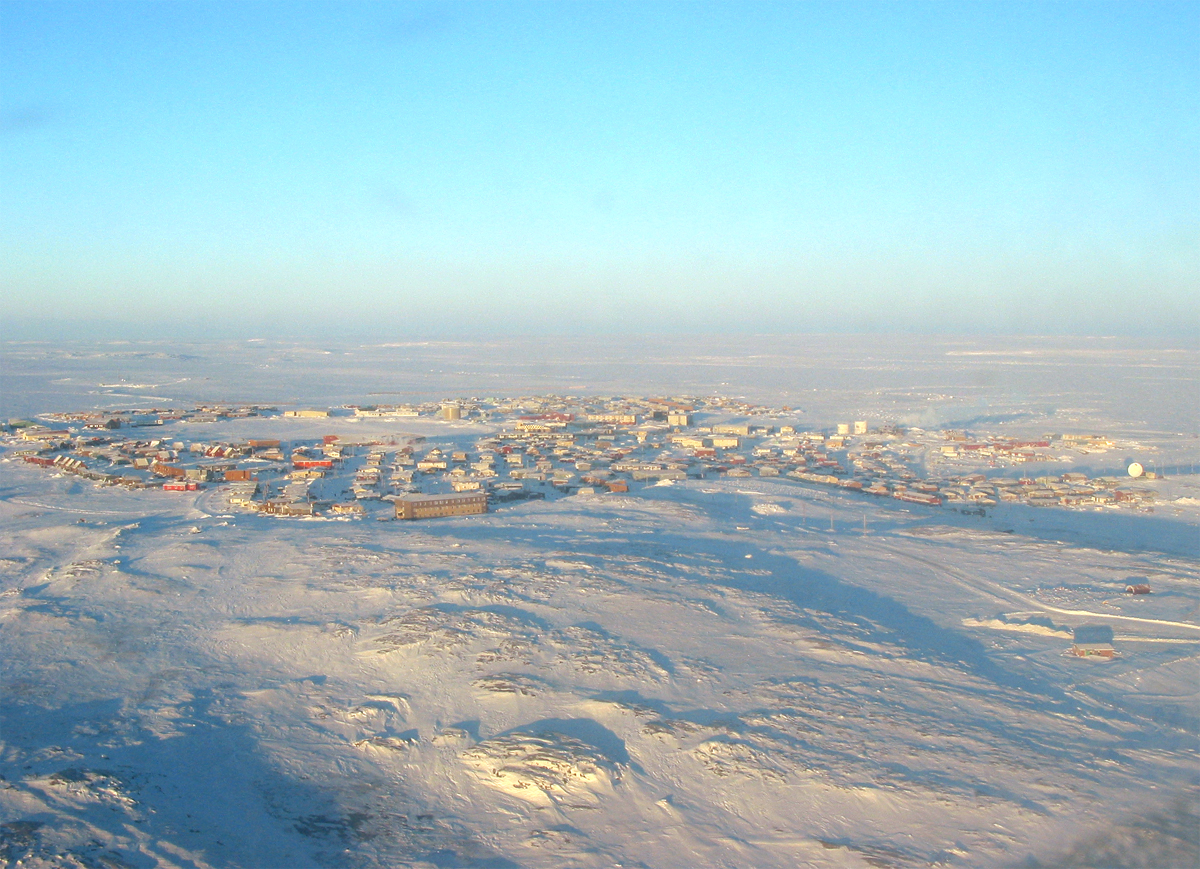
Rankin Inlet in winter

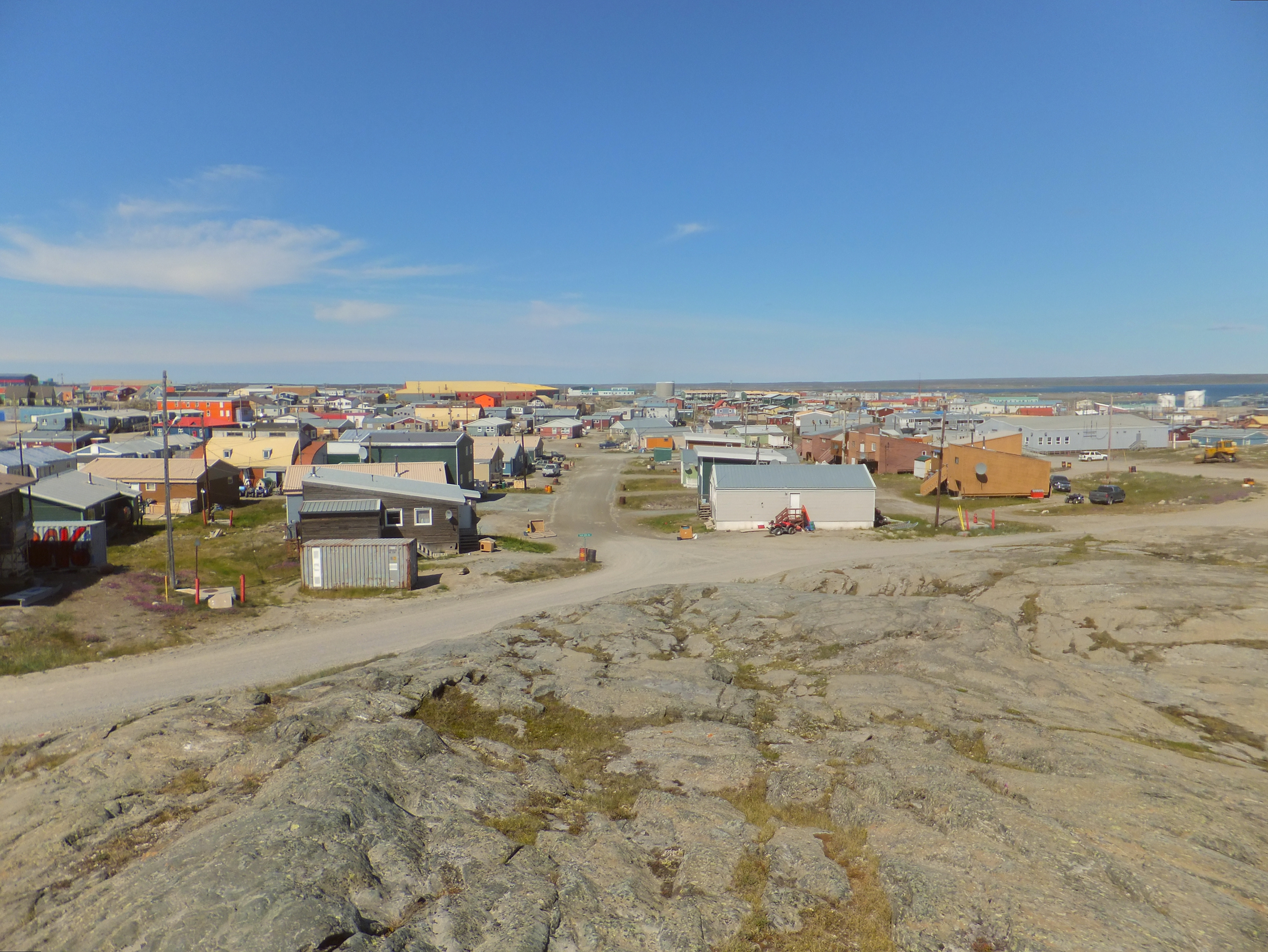
Rankin Inlet in summer. View from ridge on east end of town.

- Jack Anawak, federal and territorial level Inuk politician
- Levinia Brown, territorial level Inuk politician
- Tagak Curley, Inuk politician and a prominent figure in the negotiations that led to the creation of Nunavut
- Piita Irniq, Inuk politician and commissioner of Nunavut
- Peter Ittinuar, first federal level Inuk politician
- Victoria Kakuktinniq, Inuk fashion designer
- Jose Kusugak, Inuk politician, president of Inuit Tapiriit Kanatami and Nunavut Tunngavik Incorporated, married to Nellie Kusugak
- Lorne Kusugak, territorial level Inuk politician
- Michael Kusugak, Inuk storyteller and children's writer
- Nellie Kusugak, Inuk educator and commissioner of Nunavut, married to Jose Kusugak
- Manitok Thompson, territorial level Inuk politician
- John Tiktak, Inuk sculptor
- Hunter Tootoo, former Minister of Fisheries, Oceans and the Canadian Coast Guard
- Jordin Tootoo, former National Hockey League player

== See also ==
- Canadian NORAD Region Forward Operating Location Rankin Inlet
- Keewatin Air
- List of municipalities in Nunavut
