= Ron Elliott (politician) =

Canadian politician

MLA for Quttiktuq
- In office 2008–2013
- Preceded by: Levi Barnabas
- Succeeded by: Isaac Shooyook

Personal details
- Born: 1969 or 1970 (age 55–56)
- Party: non-partisan consensus government

Ron Elliott is a Canadian politician, who was elected as the Member of the Legislative Assembly for the electoral district of Quttiktuq in the Legislative Assembly of Nunavut in the 2008 territorial election.
