= David Qamaniq =

Canadian politician (born 1961)

David Qamaniq MLA

Member of the Legislative Assembly of Nunavut for Tununiq
- In office September 16, 2019 – September 20, 2021
- Preceded by: Joe Enook
- Succeeded by: Karen Nutarak

Personal details
- Born: David Qajaakuttuk Qamaniq; February 27, 1961 (age 65)
- Party: non-partisan consensus government

David Qajaakuttuk Qamaniq is a Canadian politician who was elected to represent the district of Tununiq in the Legislative Assembly of Nunavut in a by-election on September 16, 2019. Prior to his election to the legislature, he was a mayor of Pond Inlet; he ran in the same district in a 2011 by-election, the 2013 Nunavut general election and the 2017 Nunavut general election, losing each time to Joe Enook, and was elected in the by-election following Enook's death in office.

He was a stage actor in his youth, who toured with the Tunooniq Theatre company to perform in Inuit stage plays. He was most noted for his performance in David Holman's 1993 play Whale, for which he received a Dora Mavor Moore Award nomination for Outstanding Performance by a Male in a Principal Role – Play (Large Theatre).

Qamaniq filed a wrongful death suit against the Royal Canadian Mounted Police in April 2019, following the possibly racially motivated shooting death of his son Kunuk in 2017. He did not base his electoral campaign on the lawsuit, however, instead highlighting basic economic and community improvement proposals such as the construction of a new airstrip to serve the community, and the need for infrastructure facilities such as an indoor swimming pool, a playground, and a community hall.

== Electoral Record ==
2025 Nunavut general election: Tununiq
Candidate	Votes	%
Brian Koonoo	194	50.52
Verna Strickland	109	28.39
David Qamaniq	78	20.31
Eligible voters		792
Total valid ballots		381
Rejected ballots		3
Turnout		48.48%

2021 Nunavut general election: Tununiq
Candidate	Votes	%
Karen Nutarak	259	55.5
David Qajaakuttuk Qamaniq	146	31.3
Joshua Arreak	62	13.3
Total valid ballots		467
Rejected ballots		5

2019 Nunavut general election: Tununiq
Candidate	Votes	%
David Qajaakuttuk Qamaniq	182	51.56
Charlie Inuarak	171	48.44
Eligible voters		754
Total valid ballots		353
Rejected ballots		7
Turnout		47.75%

2017 Nunavut general election: Tununiq
Candidate	Votes	%
Joe Enook	258	50.99
David Qajaakuttuk Qamaniq	146	28.85
Jeannie Mills	102	20.16
Eligible voters		771
Total valid ballots		506
Rejected ballots		6
Turnout		66.41%

2013 Nunavut general election: Tununiq
Candidate	Votes	%
Joe Enook	359	73.12
David Qajaakuttuk Qamaniq	132	26.88
Eligible voters		764
Total valid ballots		491
Rejected ballots		11
Turnout		65.71%

2011 Nunavut general election: Tununiq
Candidate	Votes	%
Joe Enook	285	62.91
David Qajaakuttuk Qamaniq	109	24.06
Brandy Kanayuk	34	7.51
Sam Omik	27	5.96
Eligible voters		678
Total valid ballots		453
Rejected ballots		2
Turnout		67.11%
