= 2008 Nunavut general election =

Canadian territorial election

- October 27, 2008

17 out of the 19 seats in the Legislative Assembly of Nunavut
- Turnout: 72% (▼16.9pp)
Premier before election
Paul Okalik
Premier after election
Eva Aariak

The 2008 Nunavut General Election was held on October 27, 2008, to return members to the 3rd Legislative Assembly of Nunavut. The election was contested across 15 of Nunavut's 19 electoral districts under the first past the post system of voting. Due to local circumstances, the election was delayed in two districts, and two districts did not hold elections as their incumbent MLAs faced no opposition and were acclaimed back into office.

Ten of the 15 seats went to first-time MLAs, four of whom defeated incumbents. Premier Paul Okalik and Finance Minister Louis Tapardjuk were the only two cabinet ministers to keep their seats.

The political system in Nunavut is not organized along political party lines, but instead uses a consensus government model in which the Executive Council of Nunavut is selected by the members of the Legislative Assembly at the Nunavut Leadership Forum. At the 2008 forum, held on November 14, 2008, Eva Aariak was selected as the new Premier of Nunavut.

== Pre-election ==
The election was proposed by Premier Paul Okalik on March 14, 2008. The writ period under Nunavut law may last as long as thirty five days, so the earliest date the election could have begun was September 22, 2008. Prior to the official announcement the election had been widely speculated going back to late 2007, as the Premier had been openly talking about going to the polls.

=== Federal election ===
A portion of the writ period occurred during the 2008 Canadian federal election. This is a rare occurrence as elections on the federal and provincial, territorial level in Canada are usually timed to avoid such occurrences.

The last example of a concurrent federal and provincial election was the 1979 BC election and the 1979 Federal election. The voting date for those two elections was only 12 days apart.

=== Election infrastructure ===
Sandy Kusugak, the chief electoral officer for Elections Nunavut, announced at a press conference on June 4, 2008, that Nunavut will begin voting on October 13, 2008, with special ballots being made available at returning officers. Provisions are also being established to allow paperless voting by radio and satellite phone from very remote locations. On October 20, 2008, Elections Nunavut will conduct mobile polling visiting the homes of elders and people confined to their homes by disability or house arrest. Absentee ballots for students and inmates living or incarcerated outside of the territory will be made available by registration beginning on September 22, 2008. Official advanced polling will take place on October 20, 2008.

=== Issues ===
Prior to the election in the last sitting of the Assembly, members debated tightening up eligibility requirements for preventing persons convicted of criminal offences. The MLAs decided not to change any of the election regulations.

A big pre-election issue in the capital city of Iqaluit developed over Inuksuk High School. The government has been debating whether to build a new high school or do a complete renovation on the existing building.

== Election summary ==
Election summary	# of candidates		Popular vote	
Election summary	Incumbent	New	#	%
Elected candidates	5	10	4,183	51.9%
Acclaimed candidates	2	-		
Defeated candidates	4	25	3,825	47.4%
Vacancies at dissolution	2	-		
Totals	46		8,067	100%
Voter Turnout 71.2%			Rejected Votes 59 (0.7%)	

== Election results ==
Nominations for candidates to file closed on September 26, 2008. There were two candidates acclaimed among the initial 46 candidates running. Both candidates acclaimed were seasoned incumbents. Tagak Curley was acclaimed to the riding of Rankin Inlet North for the second straight election. Incumbent Keith Peterson won his second term in office after his acclamation in the Cambridge Bay electoral district.

Results by district
District	Winner	Second	Third	Fourth	Rejected ballots	Turnout	Incumbent
Amittuq	Louis Tapardjuk 399, 63.5%	Joanna Quassa; 213, 33.9%			16, 2.5%	628, 59.2%	Louis Tapardjuk
Akulliq	see below						
Arviat	Daniel Shewchuk 310, 48.0%	Sheila Napayok; 169, 26.2%	Peter Kritaqliluk; 162, 25.1%		5, 0.8%	646, 59.2%	David Alagalak
Baker Lake	Moses Aupaluktuq 266, 41.0%	David Simailak; 236, 36.4%	Elijah Amarook; 144, 22.2%		3, 0.5%	649, 67.1%	David Simailak
Cambridge Bay	Keith Peterson acclaimed						Keith Peterson
Hudson Bay	Allan Rumbolt 152, 45.0%	Johnny Manning; 121, 35.8%	Bill Fraser; 65, 19.2%		0, 0.0%	338, 81.6%	Peter Kattuk^{3}
Iqaluit Centre	Hunter Tootoo 356, 61.8%	Madeleine Redfern; 160, 27.8%	Joe Sageaktook; 57, 9.9%	~~Okalik Eegeesiak~~^{4}	3, 0.5%	576, 69.7%	Hunter Tootoo
Iqaluit East	Eva Aariak 439, 62.5%	Glenn Williams; 221, 31.5%	Kakki Peter; 39, 5.6%		3, 0.4%	702, 73.3%	Ed Picco^{3}
Iqaluit West	Paul Okalik 340, 53.0%	Elisapee Sheutiapik; 296, 46.1%			6, 0.9	642, 90.3	Paul Okalik
Kugluktuk	Peter Taptuna 264, 59.5%	Donald Havioyak; 178, 40.1%			2, 0.5%	444, 68.2%	Vacant^{1}
Nanulik	Johnny Ningeongan 214, 46.5%	Patterk Netser; 182, 39.6%	Harry Tootoo; 63, 13.7%		1, 0.2%	460, 86.3%	Patterk Netser
Nattilik	Enuk Pauloosie 229, 34.3%	Jeannie Ugyuk; 197, 29.5%	Louie Kamookak; 192, 28.8%	Paul Ikuallaq; 45, 6.7%	4, 0.6%	667, 83.7%	Vacant^{2}
Pangnirtung	Adamee Komoartok 245, 62.0%	Looee Arreak; 147, 37.2%			3, 0.8%	395, 54.8%	Peter Kilabuk^{3}
Quttiktuq	Ron Elliot 183, 51.0%	Levi Barnabas; 174, 48.5%			2, 0.6%	356, 63.9%	Levi Barnabas
Rankin Inlet North	Tagak Curley acclaimed						Tagak Curley
Rankin Inlet South/Whale Cove	Lorne Kusugak 329, 61.0%	Levinia Brown; 203, 37.7%			7, 1.3%	539, 63.9%	Levinia Brown
South Baffin	see below						
Tununiq	James Arvaluk 239, 49.7%	Simon Merkosak; 171, 35.6%	Elizirie Peterloosie; 68, 14.1%		3, 0.6%	481, 70.8%	James Arvaluk
Uqqummiut	James Arreak 218, 40.3%	Loasie Audlakiak; 212, 39.2%	Igah Hainnu; 110, 20.3%		1, 0.2%	541, 84.9%	James Arreak

== By-elections ==
Due to local circumstances, the election was delayed in two districts.

=== South Baffin ===
In the district of South Baffin, there were no candidates who filed by nomination day. The original writs were returned to the Commissioner and reissued for a new election to be held on November 3, 2008. The lack of candidates on election day surprised the constituency, causing former incumbent Olayuk Akesuk to muse about coming out of retirement for another term if no one else wanted to step forward. Four new candidates came forward to file nomination papers by the new nomination deadline on October 3, 2008.

Results by district
District	Candidates				Rejected ballots	Turnout	Incumbent
South Baffin; November 3, 2008	Fred Schell; 203, 39.6%	Adamie Nuna; 118, 23.0%	Joannie Ikkidluak; 116, 22.7%	Zeke Ejesiak; 72, 14.1%	3, 0.6%	512, 58.7%	Olayuk Akesuk^{3}

=== Akulliq ===
Former Member of Parliament and Nunavut MLA Jack Anawak attempted to file nomination papers to run for election in the electoral district of Akulliq. Chief Electoral Officer Sandy Kusugak ruled that Anawak was not eligible to run for office as he had a mailing address outside of Nunavut. Anawak took Elections Nunavut to court. The judge however ruled in favour of the decision by Kusugak that Anawak had not met the twelve month resident requirement, but under the Elections Act Kusugak was required to cancel the election.

Although the judge ruled in favour of Kusugak's disqualification under the residency rule, Anawak's constitutional challenge was allowed to go ahead. Anawak had argued that the one-year residency rule was in violation of his charter rights. However, judge Johnson ruled that the rule did not discriminate against Anawak as an Inuk. The election was rescheduled for December 15, with nominations being open until November 14.

All of the original candidates, with the exception of Anawak, refiled for the by-election, as did one new candidate, Helena Malliki.

In the initial results, former MLA John Ningark defeated incumbent MLA Steve Mapsalak by a margin of just two votes. A judicial recount was conducted, but resulted in Ningark and Mapsalak each receiving exactly 157 votes, thus forcing a second by-election. The revote was held on March 2, 2009, and Ningark won by a margin of 193 to 179 for Mapsalak.

December 15, 2008, by-election
District	Candidates				Incumbent
Akulliq	John Ningark; 157	Steve Mapsalak; 155 initial 157 recount	Helena Malliki; 111	Marius Tungilik; 38	Steve Mapsalak

March 2, 2009, by-election
District	Candidates				Rejected ballots	Turnout	Incumbent
Akulliq	John Ningark; 193, 37.04%	Steve Mapsalak; 179, 34.36%	Ovide Alakannuark; 83, 15.93%	Helena Malliki; 66, 12.67%	0	521, 77.53%	Steve Mapsalak

== Notes ==
- ^1 The member for Kugluktuk, Joe Allen Evyagotailak, stepped down August 20, 2008, stating that he wanted to run for the presidency of the Kitikmeot Inuit Association (KIA).
- ^2 On October 10, 2008, CBC North reported that Leona Aglukkaq was stepping down to run in the 2008 Canadian federal election for the Conservative Party of Canada.
- ^3 Incumbent not running.
- ^4 Eegeesiak's campaign was temporarily suspended by Kusugak after a Royal Canadian Mounted Police investigation found that she did not meet the residency requirements. A final cease and desist order was issued by Kusugak on October 23, 2008, removing Eegeesiak from the ballot. The order replaced the temporary order issued October 17.
