= Manitok Thompson =

Canadian politician

Manitok Catherine Thompson

MLA for Aivilik, NT
- In office 1995–1999
- Preceded by: James Arvaluk
- Succeeded by: riding dissolved

MLA for Rankin Inlet South/Whale Cove, NU
- In office 1999–2004
- Preceded by: first member
- Succeeded by: Levinia Brown

Personal details
- Born: 1955 (age 70–71) Coral Harbour, Northwest Territories
- Party: non-partisan consensus government

Manitok Catherine Thompson (born 1955 Coral Harbour, Northwest Territories) is a politician from northern Canada.

She was first elected to the Legislative Assembly of Northwest Territories in a by-election held on May 8, 1995 held following the resignation of James Arvaluk. She served the Northwest Territories as the minister of Community and Regional Affairs, until the creation of Nunavut in 1999. In the 1999 Nunavut general election, she was elected as the first member for Rankin Inlet South/Whale Cove. She served as Nunavut's first female cabinet minister and held different cabinet positions such as the minister of public works and services, minister for Nunavut Housing Corporation, minister of community government and transportation, minister for sport, minister of human resources and minister for Arctic College and education.

She retired from territorial level politics in 2004 and ran as an independent candidate in the 2004 Canadian federal election in Nunavut riding. She finished second.
