= Tununiq =

Territorial electoral district in Nunavut, Canada

Nunavut electoral district
- Boundaries of Tununiq
- Coordinates: 72°41′57″N 077°57′33″W

Territorial electoral district
- Legislature: Legislative Assembly of Nunavut
MLA
Brian Koonoo
- District created: 1999
- First contested: 1999
- Last contested: 2025

Tununiq (Inuktitut: ᑐᓄᓂᕐᒃ, formerly Tunniniq) is a territorial electoral district (riding) for the Legislative Assembly of Nunavut, Canada. The riding consists of the community of Pond Inlet.

== History ==
The electoral district was named for the Pond Inlet area. There was a typo in the original legislation, and was corrected by amendments passed in the Assembly.

== Members of the Legislative Assembly ==
† by-election

Parliament	Years	Member
1st	1999–2004	Jobie Nutarak
2nd	2004–2006	Jobie Nutarak
2nd†	2006–2008	James Arvaluk
3rd	2008–2011	James Arvaluk
3rd†	2011–2013	Joe Enook
4th	2013–2017	Joe Enook
5th	2017–2019	Joe Enook
5th†	2019–2021	David Qamaniq
6th	2021–2025	Karen Nutarak
7th	2025–present	Brian Koonoo

== Election results ==
=== 2025 election ===
2025 Nunavut general election
Candidate	Votes	%
Brian Koonoo	194	50.52
Verna Strickland	109	28.39
David Qamaniq	78	20.31
Eligible voters		792
Total valid ballots		381
Rejected ballots		3
Turnout		48.48%

=== 2021 election ===
2021 Nunavut general election
Candidate	Votes	%
Karen Nutarak	259	55.5
David Qajaakuttuk Qamaniq	146	31.3
Joshua Arreak	62	13.3
Total valid ballots		467
Rejected ballots		5

=== 2019 by-election ===
2019 Nunavut general election
Candidate	Votes	%
David Qajaakuttuk Qamaniq	182	51.56
Charlie Inuarak	171	48.44
Eligible voters		754
Total valid ballots		353
Rejected ballots		7
Turnout		47.75%

=== 2017 election ===
2017 Nunavut general election
Candidate	Votes	%
Joe Enook	258	50.99
David Qajaakuttuk Qamaniq	146	28.85
Jeannie Mills	102	20.16
Eligible voters		771
Total valid ballots		506
Rejected ballots		6
Turnout		66.41%

=== 2013 election ===
2013 Nunavut general election
Candidate	Votes	%
Joe Enook	359	73.12
David Qajaakuttuk Qamaniq	132	26.88
Eligible voters		764
Total valid ballots		491
Rejected ballots		11
Turnout		65.71%

=== 2011 by-election ===
2011 Nunavut general election
Candidate	Votes	%
Joe Enook	285	62.91
David Qajaakuttuk Qamaniq	109	24.06
Brandy Kanayuk	34	7.51
Sam Omik	27	5.96
Eligible voters		678
Total valid ballots		453
Rejected ballots		2
Turnout		67.11%

=== 2008 election ===
2008 Nunavut general election
Candidate	Votes	%
James Arvaluk	239	50.00
Simon Merkosak	171	35.77
Elizirie Peterloosie	68	14.23
Eligible voters		702
Total valid ballots		478
Rejected ballots		3
Turnout		68.52%

=== 2006 by-election ===
2006 Nunavut general election
Candidate	Votes	%
James Arvaluk	206	43.92
Rhonda Cunningham	150	31.98
Joseph Krimmerdjuar	68	14.50
Sam Omik	53	11.30
Eligible voters		648
Total valid ballots		469
Rejected ballots		8
Turnout		76.91%

=== 2004 election ===
2004 Nunavut general election
Candidate	Votes	%
Jobie Nutarak	142	31.84
David Qajaakuttuk Qamaniq	138	30.94
Appitaq Enuaraq	88	19.73
Sam Omik	78	17.49
Eligible voters		589
Total valid ballots		446
Rejected ballots		7
Turnout		76.91%

=== 1999 election ===
1999 Nunavut general election
Candidate	Votes	%
Jobie Nutarak	223	47.55
Caleb Sangoya	94	20.04
Sam Omik	81	17.27
Elijah Erkloo	42	8.96
Leo Mucktar	29	6.18
Eligible voters		544
Total valid ballots		469
Rejected ballots		11
Turnout		88.24%

== See also ==
- List of Nunavut territorial electoral districts
- Canadian provincial electoral districts
