= Joe Enook =

Canadian politician (1957–2019)

Joe Enook MLA

Member of the Legislative Assembly of Nunavut for Tununiq
- In office September 12, 2011 – March 29, 2019
- Preceded by: James Arvaluk
- Succeeded by: David Qajaakuttuk Qamaniq

9th Speaker of the Legislative Assembly of Nunavut
- In office November 17, 2017 – March 29, 2019
- Preceded by: George Qulaut
- Succeeded by: Simeon Mikkungwak

Personal details
- Born: 1957 near Pond Inlet, Northwest Territories
- Died: March 29, 2019 (aged 61) Ottawa, Ontario, Canada
- Party: non-partisan consensus government

Joe Enook (1957 – March 29, 2019) was a Canadian politician who was elected to represent the district of Tununiq in the Legislative Assembly of Nunavut in a by-election on September 12, 2011. He was re-elected in 2013 and 2017. In 2017, he was acclaimed as Speaker of the Legislative Assembly of Nunavut, the office he held until his death in March 2019. During his tenure as a Member of the Legislative Assembly and as its Speaker, he rarely addressed the legislature in English, as he preferred to promote the use of Inuktitut.

Enook was born in 1957 near Pond Inlet. He died in office in 2019 after a short illness at the age of 61.
