= Quttiktuq =

Territorial electoral district in Nunavut, Canada

Coordinates: 70.748°N 93.034°W

Nunavut electoral district
- Boundaries of Quttiktuq

Territorial electoral district
- Legislature: Legislative Assembly of Nunavut
MLA
Steven Taqtu
- District created: 1999
- First contested: 1999
- Last contested: 2025

Quttiktuq (Inuktitut: ᖁᑦᑎᒃᑐᕐᒃ, "Highlands") is a territorial electoral district (riding) for the Legislative Assembly of Nunavut, Canada. The riding consists of the communities of Arctic Bay, Grise Fiord, Nanisivik, and Resolute.

== Members of the Legislative Assembly ==
† by-election

Parliament	Years	Member
1st	1999–2000	Levi Barnabas
1st†	2000–2004	Rebekah Williams
2nd	2004–2008	Levi Barnabas
3rd	2008–2013	Ron Elliott
4th	2013–2017	Isaac Shooyook
5th	2017–2021	David Akeeagok
6th	2021–2025	David Akeeagok
7th	2025–present	Steven Taqtu

== Election results ==
=== 2025 election ===
2025 Nunavut general election
Candidate	Votes	%
Steven Taqtu	121	47.8
Philip Kalluk	107	42.3
Andrew Taqtu	20	7.9
Eligible voters		589
Total valid ballots		253
Rejected ballots		5
Turnout		42.95%

=== 2021 election ===
2021 Nunavut general election
Candidate	Votes
David Akeeagok	Acclaimed

=== 2017 election ===
2017 Nunavut general election
Candidate	Votes	%
David Akeeagok	189	46.44
Mishak Allurut	78	19.16
Isaac Shooyook	45	11.06
Kataisee Attagutsiak	44	10.81
Leo Eecherk	34	8.35
Andrew Taqtu	9	2.21
Mavis Manik	6	1.47
Gary Kalluk	2	0.49
Rachel Qitsualik-Tinsley	0	0.0
Eligible voters		546
Total valid ballots		407
Rejected ballots		3
Turnout		74.55%

=== 2013 election ===
2013 Nunavut general election
Candidate	Votes	%
Isaac Shooyook	232	60.4
Ron Elliott	152	39.6
Eligible voters		528
Total valid ballots		384
Rejected ballots		3
Turnout		72.7%

=== 2008 election ===
2008 Nunavut general election
Candidate	Votes	%
Ron Elliott	183	51.3
Levi Barnabas	174	48.7
Eligible voters		526
Total valid ballots		357
Rejected ballots		
Turnout		

=== 2004 election ===
2004 Nunavut general election
Candidate	Votes	%
Levi Barnabas	174	43.94
Rebekah Williams	99	25.00
Larry Audlaluk	57	14.39
Anthony Ulikatar	28	7.07
Pauloosie Attagootak	21	5.30
Lucas Amagoalik	17	4.30
Eligible voters		487
Total valid ballots		396
Rejected ballots		5
Turnout		81.34%

=== 2000 by-election ===
2000 Nunavut general election
Candidate	Votes	%
Rebekah Williams	88	21.00
David Roberts	80	19.09
Levi Barnabas	73	17.42
Natsiq Kango	60	14.32
Joanasie Akumalik	59	14.08
Tommy Enuaraq	22	5.25
Tommy Tatatuapik	22	5.25
Leah Kalluk	15	3.59
Eligible voters		592
Total valid ballots		419
Rejected ballots		3
Turnout		70.69%

=== 1999 election ===
1999 Nunavut general election
Candidate	Votes	%
Levi Barnabas	155	35.23
Larry Audlaluk	100	22.73
Elizabeth A. Roberts	71	16.14
Daniel Aola	62	14.09
Liza Ningiuk	29	6.59
Leah Kalluk	23	5.23
Eligible voters		656
Total valid ballots		440
Rejected ballots		6
Turnout		67.99%

== See also ==
- List of Nunavut territorial electoral districts
- Canadian provincial electoral districts
