= South Baffin =

Territorial electoral district in Nunavut, Canada

Nunavut electoral district
- Boundaries of South Baffin
- Coordinates: 64.360°N 72.050°W

Territorial electoral district
- Legislature: Legislative Assembly of Nunavut
MLA
David Joanasie
- District created: 1999
- First contested: 1999
- Last contested: 2025

South Baffin (Inuktitut: ᕿᑭᕐᒃᑖᓘᑉ ᓂᒋᐊ, French: Baffin Sud, Inuinnaqtun: Hivuraa Qikiqtaaluk) is a territorial electoral district (riding) for the Legislative Assembly of Nunavut, Canada. The riding consists of the communities of Kinngait and Kimmirut.

== Members of the Legislative Assembly ==
† by-election

Parliament	Years	Member
1st	1999–2004	Olayuk Akesuk
2nd	2004–2008	Olayuk Akesuk
3rd†	2008–2013	Fred Schell
4th	2013–2017	David Joanasie
5th	2017–2021	David Joanasie
6th	2021–2025	David Joanasie
7th	2025–present	David Joanasie

== Election results ==
=== 2025 election ===
2025 Nunavut general election
Candidate	Votes	%
David Joanasie	Acclaimed	

=== 2021 election ===
2021 Nunavut general election
Candidate	Votes	%
David Joanasie	Acclaimed	

=== 2017 election ===
2017 Nunavut general election
Candidate	Votes	%
David Joanasie	310	61.39
Michael Salomonie	195	38.61
Eligible voters		917
Total valid ballots		505
Rejected ballots		8
Turnout		55.04%

=== 2013 election ===
2013 Nunavut general election
Candidate	Votes	%
David Joanasie	409	58.2
Tommy Akavak	160	22.8
Mathew Saveakjuk Jaw	51	7.3
Fred Schell	43	6.1
Joannie Ikkidluak	40	5.7
Eligible voters		853
Total valid ballots		703
Rejected ballots		1
Turnout		82.4%

=== 2008 by-election ===
2008 Nunavut general election
Candidate	Votes	%
Fred Schell	203	39.6
Adamie Nuna	118	23.0
Joannie Ikkidluak	116	22.7
Zeke Ejesiak	72	14.1
Eligible voters		872
Total valid ballots		509
Rejected ballots		3
Turnout		58.37%

=== 2008 general election ===
2008 Nunavut general election
Candidate	Votes	
Result		No candidates nominated; by-election held November 3, 2008

=== 2004 election ===
2004 Nunavut general election
Candidate	Votes	%
Olayuk Akesuk	300	58.94
Martha Lyta	110	21.61
Malicktoo Lyta	99	19.45
Eligible voters		466
Total valid ballots		509
Rejected ballots		3
Turnout		109.17%

=== 1999 election ===
1999 Nunavut general election
Candidate	Votes	%
Olayuk Akesuk	368	53.18
Goo Arlooktoo	232	33.53
Mathew Saveakjuk	92	13.29
Eligible voters		759
Total valid ballots		692
Rejected ballots		5
Turnout		91.23%

== See also ==
- List of Nunavut territorial electoral districts
- Canadian provincial electoral districts
