= Kevin O'Brien (Nunavut politician) =

Canadian politician (born 1955)

MLA for Kiviallivik, NT
- In office 1995–1999
- Preceded by: Silas Arngna'naaq
- Succeeded by: riding dissolved

MLA for Arviat, NU
- In office 1999–2004
- Preceded by: first member
- Succeeded by: David Alagalak

Personal details
- Born: October 26, 1956 (age 69) Glace Bay, Nova Scotia
- Party: Liberal
- Education: Dalhousie University (B.Sc.); University of North Texas (M.Sc)
- Occupation: Union negotiator

Kevin J. O'Brien (born October 26, 1955) is a Canadian politician. Born in Cape Breton Island Nova Scotia, O'Brien is a union negotiator, former civil servant and a former municipal and territorial level politician who has served as a Member of both the Northwest Territories Legislature and the Nunavut Legislature. He served as Speaker of the Legislative Assembly of Nunavut from 2000 to 2004.

== Biography ==
O'Brien was first elected to the Northwest Territories Legislature in the 1995 Northwest Territories general election. He defeated incumbent MLA Silas Arngna'naaq to win the Kivallivik electoral district. He served a single term in the Legislature before Northwest Territories and Nunavut were split and his electoral district was abolished.

O'Brien ran for a seat in the first Nunavut general election held in 1999. He won the Arviat electoral district and became its first member. O'Brien was elected Speaker of the House in 2000 and held it until his defeat in the 2004 Nunavut general election. He was defeated by David Alagalak in a hotly contested race finishing a distant fourth.

During the 2004 election, O'Brien was fined for possession of alcohol in Arviat, Nunavut, a dry community. The fine was publicized after the election.

In 2011, O'Brien sought the Liberal Party of Canada nomination for North Vancouver, but lost to Taleeb Noormohamed.

Legislative Assembly of the Northwest Territories
| Preceded by Levi Barnabas | Speaker of the Legislative Assembly of Nunavut; 2000-2004 | Succeeded by Jobie Nutarak |
