= Levi Barnabas =

Canadian politician

MLA for Quttiktuq, NT
- In office 1995–1999
- Preceded by: Ludy Pudluk
- Succeeded by: Riding dissolved

MLA for Quttiktuq, NU
- In office 1999–2000
- Preceded by: Riding created
- Succeeded by: Rebekah Williams

MLA for Quttiktuq, NU
- In office 2004–2008
- Preceded by: Rebekah Williams
- Succeeded by: Ron Elliott

Personal details
- Born: January 24, 1964 (age 62) Igloolik, Nunavut
- Party: non-partisan consensus government

Levi Barnabas (born January 24, 1964) is a Canadian politician. He was elected to the Legislative Assembly of Northwest Territories in 1995 and served until Nunavut was created in 1999. Barnabas served as the first Speaker in the Legislative Assembly of Nunavut.

== Biography ==
In 1999 he was elected to the 1st Legislative Assembly of Nunavut but had to resign in August 2000 after being convicted of sexual assault. The conviction came at the same time as James Arvaluk was charged with assault against his girlfriend. He pleaded guilty and resigned. The two scandals rocked the new government, and caused a substantial drop in positive public opinion. The resignation led to the first by-election in Nunavut history.

Barnabas ran in the December 2000 by-election but was defeated by Rebekah Williams. He ran again in the 2004 Nunavut election in a hotly contested race and defeated Williams by doubling her vote count.

Legislative Assembly of Nunavut
Preceded by New Position	Speaker of the Legislative Assembly of Nunavut; 1999-2000	Succeeded by Kevin O'Brien
