= Hunter Tootoo =

Canadian politician (born 1963)

The Honourable Hunter Tootoo Hᐊᓐᑕ ᑐᑐ PC
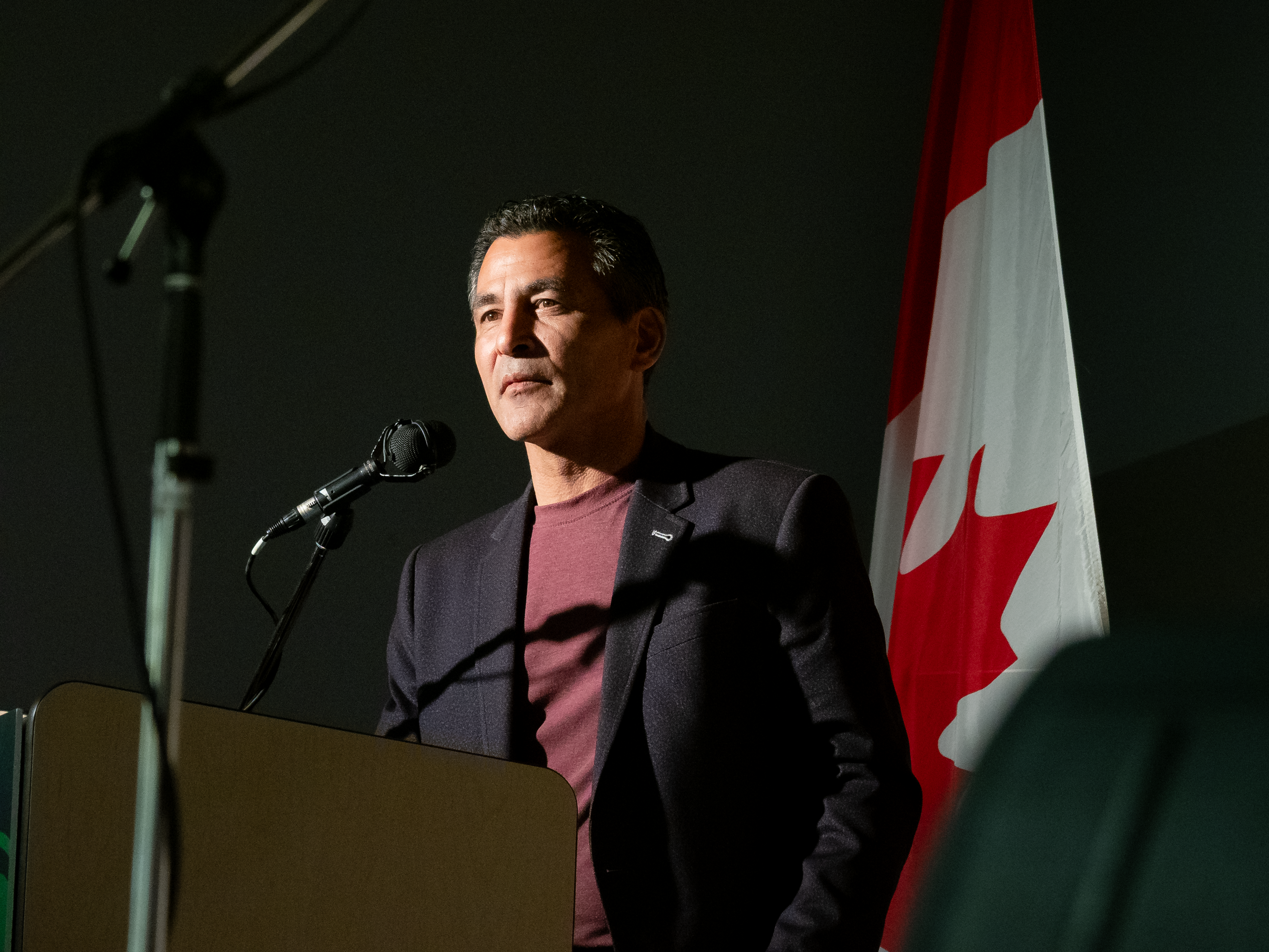
- Hunter Tootoo speaking at Pond Inlet, NU, 2017

Minister of Fisheries, Oceans and the Canadian Coast Guard
- In office November 4, 2015 – May 31, 2016
- Prime Minister: Justin Trudeau
- Preceded by: Gail Shea
- Succeeded by: Dominic LeBlanc

Member of Parliament for Nunavut
- In office October 19, 2015 – September 11, 2019
- Preceded by: Leona Aglukkaq
- Succeeded by: Mumilaaq Qaqqaq

7th Speaker of the Nunavut Legislative Assembly
- In office May 31, 2011 – November 15, 2013
- Preceded by: Paul Okalik
- Succeeded by: George Qulaut

Member of the Legislative Assembly of Nunavut for Iqaluit Centre
- In office February 15, 1999 – October 28, 2013
- Preceded by: Territory Established
- Succeeded by: Riding Dissolved

Personal details
- Born: August 18, 1963 (age 63) Rankin Inlet, Northwest Territories (now Nunavut), Canada
- Party: Independent
- Other political affiliations: Liberal; New Democratic (1997-1999)

Hunter A. Tootoo PC (Inuktitut: Hᐊᓐᑕ ᑐᑐ; born August 18, 1963) is a Canadian politician who served as the Member of Parliament for Nunavut from 2015 to 2019. Elected as a Liberal to the House of Commons, he was appointed Minister of Fisheries, Oceans and the Canadian Coast Guard by Justin Trudeau on November 4, 2015. Tootoo resigned from that position on May 31, 2016, to take a leave from Parliament and completed a two-month treatment program for alcohol addiction. He sat as an independent member for the remainder of the 42nd Parliament and did not run for re-election in 2019.

Before federal politics, Tootoo served as a Member of the Legislative Assembly of Nunavut, where he represented the riding of Iqaluit Centre from 1999 to 2013. Tootoo was Speaker of the Legislative Assembly from 2011 to 2013. He was a member of the New Democratic Party from 1997 to 1999. Tootoo has represented Nunavut at the Canadian Curling Club Championships multiple times and became the president of the territorial curling association in 2020.

== Early life and career ==
Tootoo was born in Rankin Inlet, the son of Batiste Tootoo, an Inuk, and Sally Luttmer (née Wolfe), originally from Montreal and descended from Lithuanian Jewish immigrants. He is a businessman in northern Canada, and was the co-founder of the Iqaluit branch of Arctic Insurance Brokers Ltd. Tootoo is a former member of the Northwest Territories Co-op Business Development Board, the Sport North Board of Directors, and Arctic Co-operatives Ltd.

Tootoo has long been involved in government administration. He served as regional coordinator for the town of Arviat in 1993. He became the administration officer for the NWT Department of Recreation and Tourism in 1995, and was named as the corporate control officer of the NWT Department of Finance later in the same year. In 1997, he became assistant director of the NWT Housing Corporation in Iqaluit. Tootoo was a member of the Public Service Alliance of Canada in this period.

== Political career ==
He began his political career as a member of the Hamlet Council of Rankin Inlet. In the federal election of 1997, he ran for the Canadian House of Commons as a candidate of the New Democratic Party in the riding of Nunavut. He finished third, behind Liberal Nancy Karetak-Lindell. Tootoo spoke out against the Liberal government's gun registration program during this campaign.

=== Territorial politics ===
Nunavut became a separate jurisdiction in 1999, and Tootoo declared himself a candidate for the territory's first general election. He was easily elected in Iqaluit Centre, defeating three opponents. He was returned again in the 2004 election, although by a narrower margin, and again in the 2008 election. During his time in the legislature, he served as Minister Responsible for the Nunavut Housing Corporation, Minister Responsible for Homelessness and Minister Responsible for the Qulliq Energy Corporation.

The government of Nunavut is structured along non-partisan lines, and all members are elected and serve as independents. Tootoo was often described as the unofficial leader of the legislative opposition. In 2003, he successfully tabled a motion to remove Jack Anawak from the Nunavut cabinet.

=== Federal politics ===
Tootoo was selected on July 27, 2015, as the Liberal candidate for the Nunavut federal electoral riding in the 2015 Canadian federal election. He stepped down as the chair of the Nunavut Planning Commission shortly afterwards. On October 19, 2015, Tootoo won the election, defeating Conservative incumbent and cabinet minister Leona Aglukkaq.

==== Minister of Fisheries, Oceans and the Canadian Coast Guard ====
On November 4, 2015, Tootoo was appointed as Minister of Fisheries, Oceans and the Canadian Coast Guard in the 29th Canadian Ministry; He became the first Fisheries Minister to be from Northern Canada. He resigned from the cabinet on May 31, 2016, citing issues with addiction. Tootoo also resigned from the Liberal caucus and his cabinet role was filled by Dominic LeBlanc. The Globe and Mail reported that Tootoo entered treatment for alcohol abuse.

==== As independent MP ====
By July 25, 2016, Tootoo completed his alcohol addiction treatment program and resumed his duties as an MP starting with an invitation to a constituency open house on the 28th. In the same month, after a report by The Globe and Mail, Tootoo admitted that he had had a "consensual but inappropriate" relationship with one of his female staffers which led to his resignation, which had been kept quiet in respect for the privacy of the other parties.

In September 2016, Robert Fife of The Globe and Mail reported that after Tootoo broke off his relationship with his staffer in favour of a relationship with her mother, the staffer damaged his Parliamentary office, which prompted Tootoo to tender his resignation to Prime Minister Trudeau.

He did not seek re-election in the 2019 federal election and said that he would be leaving politics.

== Post-political career ==
In November 2020, Tootoo became the president of the Nunavut Curling Association. His term started amid logistical difficulties caused by the COVID-19 pandemic in Nunavut that closed the rinks in Rankin Inlet and Cambridge Bay during qualifications for the Brier and the Scotties Tournament of Hearts.

Tootoo was the second for the Nunavut curling team at the 2021 and the 2024 Canadian Curling Club Championships. At 61, he was one of the oldest competitors at the latter competition.

== Personal life ==
Tootoo is the cousin of hockey player Jordin Tootoo and the nephew of Manitoba NDP MLA George Hickes. Tootoo's mother is Jewish from Montreal. Tootoo is also an avid curler. He has played for the Nunavut team at four Canadian Curling Club Championships (2013, 2019, 2021, 2024). In 2021, Tootoo was a member of the Wade Kingdon team at the Nunavut Brier Playdowns. They lost in a best-of-five series, three games to two.

== Electoral record ==
=== Federal ===
2015 Canadian federal election: Nunavut
Party	Candidate	Votes	%	±%	Expenditures
Liberal	Hunter Tootoo	5,619	47.11	+18.41	$31,498.80
New Democratic	Jack Anawak	3,171	26.58	+7.21	$10,713.72
Conservative	Leona Aglukkaq	2,956	24.78	–25.12	$36,393.17
Green	Spencer Rocchi	182	1.53	–0.50	none listed
Total valid votes/expense limit		11,928	99.21	–	$203,887.65
Total rejected ballots		95	0.79	+0.08	
Turnout		12,023	59.37	+13.66	
Eligible voters		20,252			
Liberal gain from Conservative		Swing		+21.77	
Source: Elections Canada

1997 Canadian federal election: Nunavut
Party	Candidate	Votes	%	±%	Expenditures
Liberal	Nancy Karetak-Lindell	3,302	45.89	−23.87	$30,212
Progressive Conservative	Okalik Eegeesiak	1,737	24.14	+3.54	$11,251
New Democratic	Hunter Tootoo	1,710	23.76	+14.10	$11,918
Reform	John Turner	447	6.21	–	none listed
Total valid votes		7,196	99.34		
Total rejected ballots		48	0.66	–	
Turnout		7,244	59.80	–	
Eligible voters		12,114			
Liberal notional hold		Swing		−13.70	
Source: Elections Canada

=== Territorial ===
2008 Nunavut general election: Iqaluit Centre
Name	Vote	%
Hunter Tootoo	317	61.7%
Madeleine Redfern	146	28.4%
Joe Sageaktook	51	9.9%
Total Valid Ballots	514	100%
Voter Turnout	Rejected Ballots	

2004 Nunavut general election: Iqaluit Centre
Name	Vote	%
Hunter Tootoo	263	44.80%
Mike Courtney	167	28.45%
Natsiq Alainga-Kango	78	13.29%
Mary Ellen Thomas	37	6.30%
Kevin MacCormack	29	4.94%
Pauloosie Paniloo	13	2.22%
Total Valid Ballots	587	100%
Voter Turnout 101.73%	Rejected Ballots 2	

1999 Nunavut general election: Iqaluit Centre
Name	Vote	%
Hunter Tootoo	261	54.95%
Lynda Gunn	95	20.00%
Johnny Nowdlak	64	13.47%
Bill Strickland	55	11.58%
Total Valid Ballots	475	100%
Voter Turnout %	Rejected Ballots	

29th Canadian Ministry (2015–2025) – Cabinet of Justin Trudeau
Cabinet post (1)
Predecessor	Office	Successor
Gail Shea	Minister of Fisheries, Oceans and the Canadian Coast Guard; November 4, 2015 – May 31, 2016	Dominic LeBlanc (acting)
Parliament of Canada
Preceded by Leona Aglukkaq	Member of Parliament for Nunavut; October 19, 2015 – present	Incumbent
