= Ed Picco =

Canadian politician

MLA for Iqaluit, NT
- In office 1995–1999
- Preceded by: Dennis Patterson
- Succeeded by: riding dissolved

MLA for Iqaluit East, NU
- In office 1999–2008
- Preceded by: first member
- Succeeded by: Eva Aariak

Personal details
- Born: September 21, 1961 (age 64) Portugal Cove, Newfoundland, Canada
- Party: non-partisan consensus government

Edward "Ed" Walter Picco (born September 21, 1961) is a Canadian politician first elected in the 1995 Northwest Territories election. He was re-elected in the 1999 Nunavut election and in the 2004 Nunavut election. Picco is one of the few Canadian politicians elected to two different legislative assemblies, having been elected in 1995 to the Legislative Assembly of the Northwest Territories and in 1999 to the Legislative Assembly of Nunavut.

Picco held several cabinet posts in the Government of Nunavut including Minister of Health and Social Services, Minister of Education, Immigration, Homelessness, Energy and Nunavut Arctic College. Picco had represented Iqaluit East since 1999 and was the longest-serving MLA in Nunavut prior to the general election in 2008. He chose not to run in the 2008 general election and re-entered the private sector. From 2009 to 2014, he was the Director of Marketing and Sales for First Air.

In 2014, he was appointed principal secretary to Premier Peter Taptuna, serving until December 2017 when the Premier's term ended. In January 2018, he was Principal and co-founder of the Niksiit Group, a multi-faceted company specializing in mediation, conflict resolution and human resource training.

Prior to entering politics, Picco was the Business Development Manager of the Baffin Business Development Corporation (BBDC). He holds a diploma in Adult Education from St. Francis Xavier University and is a graduate of the College of Trades and Technology, St. John's, Newfoundland and Labrador. He was awarded the Queen Elizabeth II Golden Jubilee Medal that was presented by His Royal Highness Prince Philip in recognition of his ongoing support to the Terry Fox program. He is also the recipient of the Queen Elizabeth II Diamond Jubilee Medal, for community service. He is a recipient of Iqaluit's Volunteer of the Year award and was the local fundraising chair for the re-building of Iqaluit's St. Jude's Cathedral from 2004 to 2017.
