= Jobie Nutarak =

Canadian politician

MLA for Tunnuniq
- In office 1999–2006
- Preceded by: first member
- Succeeded by: James Arvaluk

Personal details
- Born: May 10, 1947 Pond Inlet, Northwest Territories
- Died: April 22, 2006 (aged 58) Pond Inlet, Nunavut
- Party: Non-partisan consensus government

Jobie Nutarak (May 10, 1947 – April 22, 2006) was a politician from Nunavut in northern Canada.

== Biography ==
Nutarak was born in Pond Inlet on Baffin Island. He was elected to the district of Tunnuniq in 1999 and was re-elected in 2004. In 2004 he was elected to the position of Speaker of the Legislative Assembly of Nunavut, being the first unilingual Inuktitut speaking person to hold the position. Prior to territorial politics, Nutarak was involved in local and regional education and active with Inuit land claims organizations.

Nutarak died while on a snowmobile hunting trip, leaving behind a wife, Joanna Nutarak, and five children, Dennis, Harvey, Marc, Angela, and Melanie, along with five grandchildren.

Legislative Assembly of Nunavut
Preceded by Kevin O'Brien	Speaker of the Legislative Assembly of Nunavut; 2004-2006	Succeeded by Peter Kilabuk
