= James Arvaluk =

Canadian politician

Member of the Legislative Assembly of the Northwest Territories
- In office 1991–1995
- Preceded by: Peter Irniq
- Succeeded by: Manitok Thompson
- Constituency: Aivilik

Member of the Legislative Assembly of Nunavut
- In office 1999–2003
- Preceded by: first member
- Succeeded by: Patterk Netser
- Constituency: Nanulik
- In office 2006 – May 16, 2011
- Preceded by: Jobie Nutarak
- Succeeded by: Joe Enook
- Constituency: Tununiq

Personal details
- Born: April 1948 near Fury and Hecla Strait, Qikiqtaaluk Region, Nunavut
- Died: April 27, 2016 (aged 67–68) Winnipeg
- Party: non-partisan consensus government

James Arvaluk (April 1948 – April 27, 2016) was a Canadian politician from Coral Harbour, Nunavut. He served as a member of the Legislative Assembly of Northwest Territories from 1991 to 1995 and a member of the Legislative Assembly of Nunavut from 1999 to 2003. He served as Nunavut's first Minister of Education.

== Career ==
In February 1995 Arvaluk resigned his seat in the NWT Legislative Assembly after being charged with sexual assault. He was convicted of two sexual assaults and sentenced to five years. However, after a successful appeal on one of the two counts he was required to serve only two and a half years.

On June 20, 2003 he resigned his seat after being convicted of assault causing bodily harm against his girlfriend in August 2000, for which he served nine months.

Had he not resigned, the Legislative Assembly was prepared to meet in an emergency session and pass a motion forcing him to leave.

At the October 16, 2006 by-election, Arvaluk was elected to the Legislative Assembly representing the Tununiq electoral district. After suffering both a heart attack and a stroke in 2010, he resigned his post on May 16, 2011, citing health reasons. He died in Winnipeg on April 27, 2016.

1980 Canadian federal election: Nunatsiaq
Party	Candidate	Votes	%	±%
New Democratic	Peter Ittinuar	2,688	47.27	+9.53
Liberal	James Arvaluk	2,377	41.80	+5.53
Progressive Conservative	Lyle Stevenson	442	7.77	–18.22
Rhinoceros	Lloyd Ellsworth	180	3.17	–
Total valid votes		5,687	99.54	
Total rejected ballots		26	0.46	–0.17
Turnout		5,713	66.76	+1.81
Eligible voters		8,558		
New Democratic hold		Swing		−2.41
Source: Elections Canada
