= Iqaluit West =

Former territorial electoral district in Nunavut, Canada

Coordinates: 63.753°N 68.537°W

Iqaluit West was a territorial electoral district (riding) for the Legislative Assembly of Nunavut, Canada. The riding consists of the community of Iqaluit. Its most recent member of the Legislative Assembly was Paul Okalik who resigned to run in the 2011 Canadian federal election. A by-election was held 12 September 2011.

In 2008, Okalik defeated Iqaluit mayor Elisapee Sheutiapik in the 2008 territorial election.

The district was replaced by the riding of Iqualuit-Manirajak shortly before the 2013 Nunavut general election.

== Election results ==
=== 1999 election ===
1999 Nunavut general election
Name	Vote	%
Paul Okalik	334	50.61%
Ben S. Ell	166	25.15%
Matthew Spence	160	24.24%
Total Valid Ballots	660	100%
Voter Turnout %	Rejected Ballots	

=== 2004 election ===
2004 Nunavut general election
Name	Vote	%
Paul Okalik	415	76.99%
Doug Workman	124	23.11%
Total Valid Ballots	539	100%
Voter Turnout 101.13%	Rejected Ballots 2	

=== 2008 election ===
2008 Nunavut general election
Name	Vote	%
Paul Okalik	340	53.5%
Elisapee Sheutiapik	296	46.5%
Total Valid Ballots	636	100%
Voter Turnout %	Rejected Ballots	

=== 2011 by-election ===
September 12, 2011 by-election
Name	Vote	%
Monica Ell-Kanayuk	230	53.99%
Kirt Ejesiak	158	37.09%
Tuutalik Boychuck	38	8.92%
Total Valid Ballots	428	100%
Voter Turnout 60.20%	Rejected Ballots 2	

== See also ==
- List of Nunavut territorial electoral districts
- Canadian provincial electoral districts
