= Peter Kilabuk =

Canadian politician (born 1960)

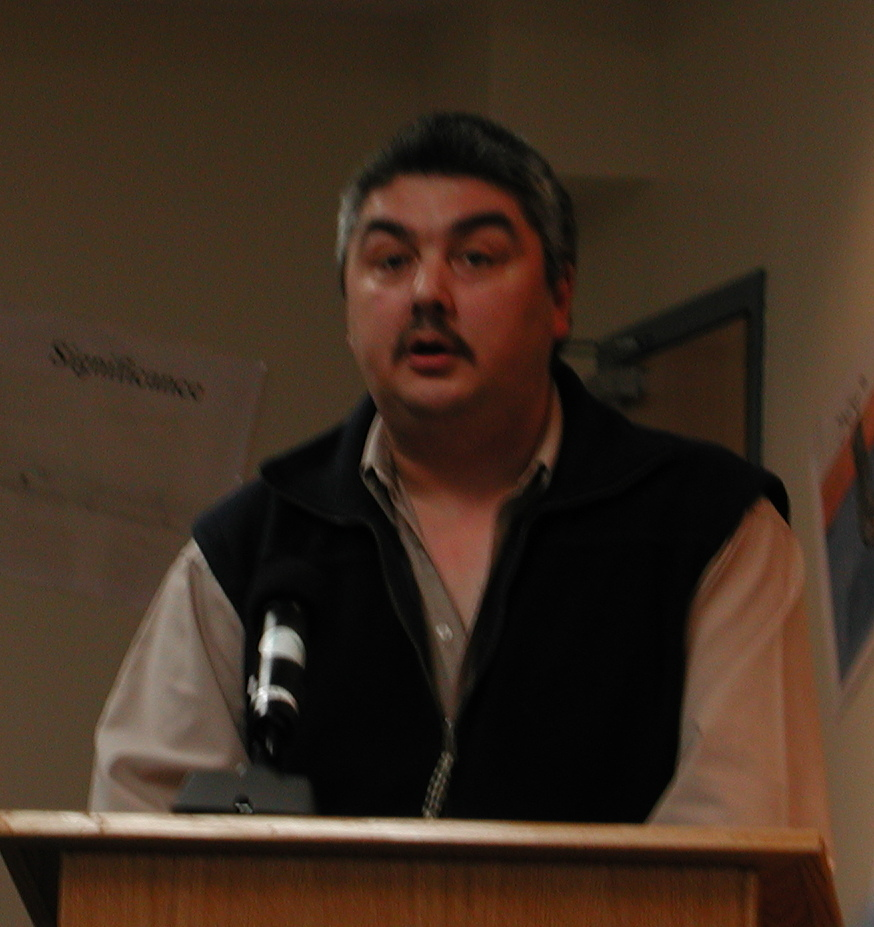
- Peter Kilabuk while Minister of Education

MLA for Pangnirtung
- In office 1999–2008
- Preceded by: new district
- Succeeded by: Adamee Komoartok

Personal details
- Born: 27 September 1960 (age 65) Pangnirtung, Northwest Territories (now Nunavut), Canada
- Party: non-partisan consensus government

Peter Kilabuk (born 27 September 1960) is a retired Canadian politician, who was the Member of the Legislative Assembly (MLA) for the electoral district of Pangnirtung in the Legislative Assembly of Nunavut from 1999 to 2008.

On 9 June 2006 Kilabuk was appointed speaker of the Legislative Assembly. He did not stand for re-election in the 2008 territorial election.

Prior to becoming an MLA, Kilabuk worked for Parks Canada and is a member of the Canadian Rangers.
