= Consensus democracy =

Form of government

Consensus democracy is the application of consensus decision-making and supermajority to the process of legislation in a democracy. It is characterized by a decision-making structure that involves and takes into account as broad a range of opinions as possible, as opposed to majoritarian democracy systems where minority opinions can potentially be ignored by vote-winning majorities. Constitutions typically require consensus or supermajority.

A consensus government is a national unity government with representation across the whole political spectrum. A concordance democracy is a type of consensus democracy where majority rule does not play a central role. Optional referendums and popular initiatives correspond to consensus democracy.

== Definition ==
Lijphart defined consensus democracy as the opposite of the majoritarian Westminster model in many aspects:

"The consensus model of democracy may be described in terms of eight elements which stand in sharp contrast to the majoritarian characteristics of the Westminster model ...

All of the eight elements aim at restraining majority rule by requiring or encouraging: the sharing of power between the majority and the minority (grand coalitions), the dispersal of power (among executive and legislature, two legislative chambers, and several minority parties), a fair distribution of power (proportional representation), (...) and a formal limit on power (by means of the minority veto)."

The elements are:

- supermajoritarian power sharing, i.e. grand coalitions or other oversized cabinets
- power sharing between the executive and legislature (typically fusion of powers - parliamentary states - but may be separation of powers, like in Switzerland) and possibly multiple chambers
- multi-party system (as opposed to two-party systems) and proportional representation
- minority vetos

== Examples ==
The 2019 Legislative Assembly of the Northwest Territories is an example of consensus government: all MLAs are non-partisan and together elect the Premier and Cabinet.

Consensus democracy is most closely embodied in certain countries such as Switzerland, Germany, Austria, Denmark, Lebanon, Sweden, Iraq, and Belgium, where consensus is an important feature of political culture, particularly with a view to preventing the domination of one linguistic or cultural group in the political process. The term consociational state is used in political science to describe countries with such consensus based political systems. An example of such a system could be the Dutch Poldermodel. Many parties in Lebanon call for applying consensus democracy, especially at times of crisis.

Tripartism applies consensus democracy to economic policy by fostering social dialogue between opposing interest groups, primarily national trade unions and employers' organizations.

Consensus government chiefly arises in non-partisan democracies and similar systems in which a majority of politicians are independent. Many former British territories with large indigenous populations use consensus government to fuse traditional tribal leadership with the Westminster system. Consensus government in Canada is used in the Northwest Territories and Nunavut, as well as the autonomous Nunatsiavut region, and similar systems have arisen in the Pacific island nations of Fiji, Tuvalu and Vanuatu, as well as the ancient Tynwald of the Isle of Man.

== Criticism ==
Sartori opposed Lijphart's consensus democracy model (with the exception that he considered moderated proportional representation in itself, not objectionable, unlike the "extreme" of a Proporz system), arguing that just models reward division:

"Grand coalitions obscure responsibility to the utmost and are, as a rule, more heterogeneous and therefore more easily gridlocked than minimum-winning coalitions.

Dispersal of power among executive and legislature easily becomes a messy and wasteful confusion of power; and a dispersal of power across several minority parties adds profusion to confusion. (..)

Finally, to admit the minority veto as a major and normal means of limiting power is to admit a shuddering principle."

"Consociational democracy is a cross-pressured system held together by countervailing, solidaristic elites bent upon neutralizing the centrifugal pulls of their societies; consensus democracy is, instead, a one-way slope that leads to a self-reinforcing system of minority appetites."

== Electoral systems ==
The Borda count tends to elect broadly-acceptable options or candidates (rather than consistently following the preferences of a majority).

== See also ==
- Anticipatory democracy
- Bioregional democracy
- Coalition government
- Consensus decision-making
- Consociationalism
- Direct democracy
- Grassroots democracy
- Hung parliament
- Jirga
- List of politics-related topics
- Minoritarianism
- Median voter theorem
- Open source governance
- Types of democracy
