= List of Nunavut general elections =

Canadian territorial elections

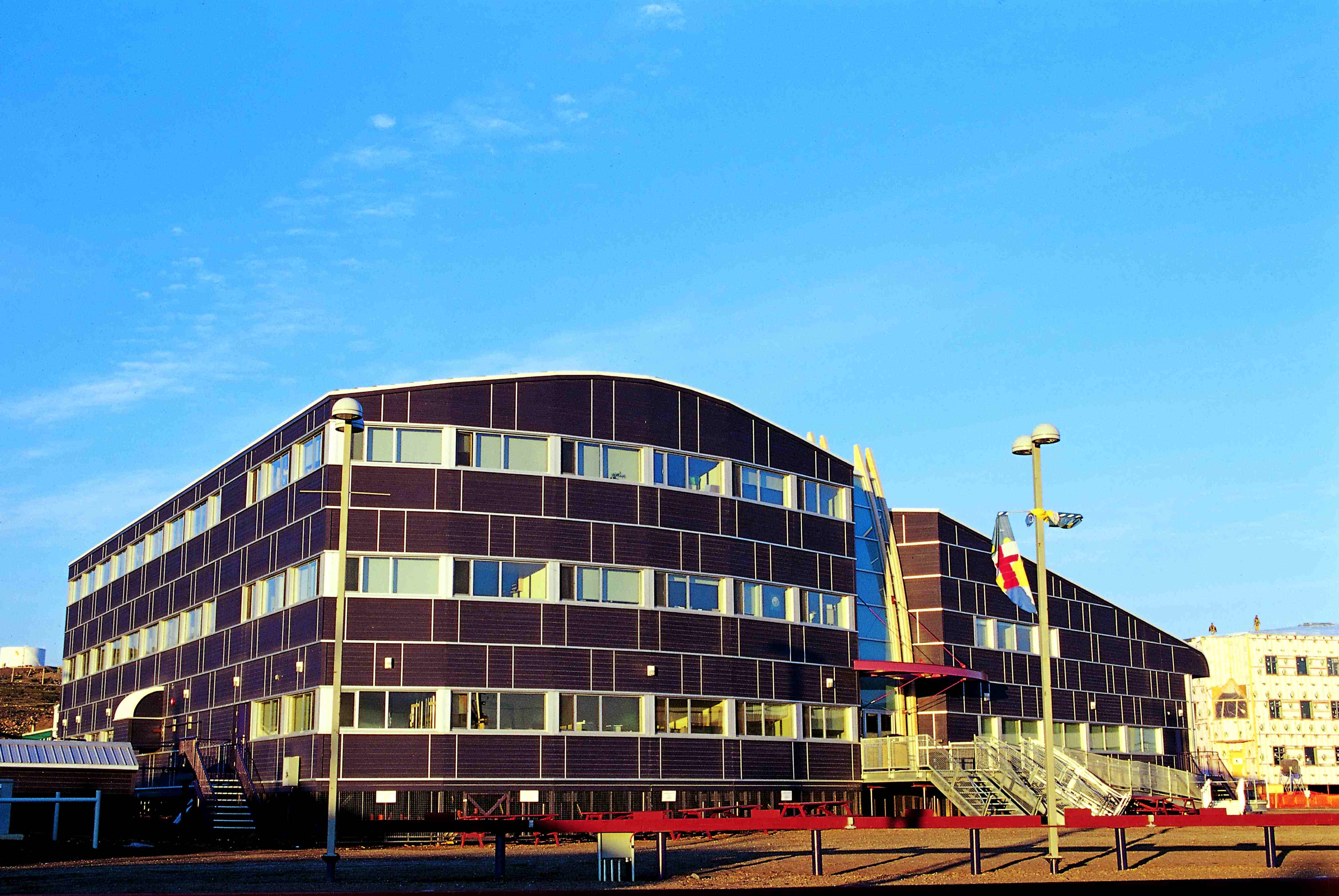
Legislative Assembly of Nunavut

The Canadian territory of Nunavut holds general elections to its unicameral legislative body, the Legislative Assembly of Nunavut. Nunavut was created 1 April 1999 from part of the Northwest Territories, and its first election was held prior to division on 15 February 1999. Since the adoption of a fixed election date law in 2014, general elections in Nunavut are held on the last Monday of October in the fourth calendar year following the last elections.

Nunavut is divided into nineteen constituencies, each electing one Member of the Legislative Assembly (MLA). The number of constituencies has remained unchanged since the first general election. Nunavut uses consensus government in which there are no political parties. The Premier of Nunavut (and the cabinet) is directly elected by the MLAs, unlike most other provincial or territorial premiers, who are officially appointed by a Lieutenant-Governor or Commissioner on account of their leadership of a majority bloc in the legislature.

In the electoral district of Akulliq, the 2008 election was delayed because of a legal battle that was brought forth by the former Member of Parliament Jack Anawak. Anawak filed as a candidate in the 2008 election but his application was rejected by Elections Nunavut because he had not lived in the territory for twelve consecutive months prior to the election. After Anawak's case was dismissed by the courts, a by-election was held on December 15, 2008. During the 2008 election, only two votes separated incumbent MLA Steve Mapsalak and his main challenger, former Northwest Territories MLA John Ningark. As a result, a judicial recount was conducted, however this resulted in Ningark and Mapsalak each receiving exactly 157 votes, meaning that the election resulted in a tie. A second election took place three months later on March 2, 2009. During the second election, John Ningark beat out his opponent Steve Mapsalak 193 votes to 179. The 2008 election was also unusual in that one electoral district, South Baffin, saw no candidates nominated in time for the general election. A by-election was scheduled for 3 November 2008, with four candidates.

No people have remained in office through the five general elections that have taken place in Nunavut.

== Results ==
The table below shows the winners of every riding for each election. Full details on any election are linked via the year of the election at the top of the column.

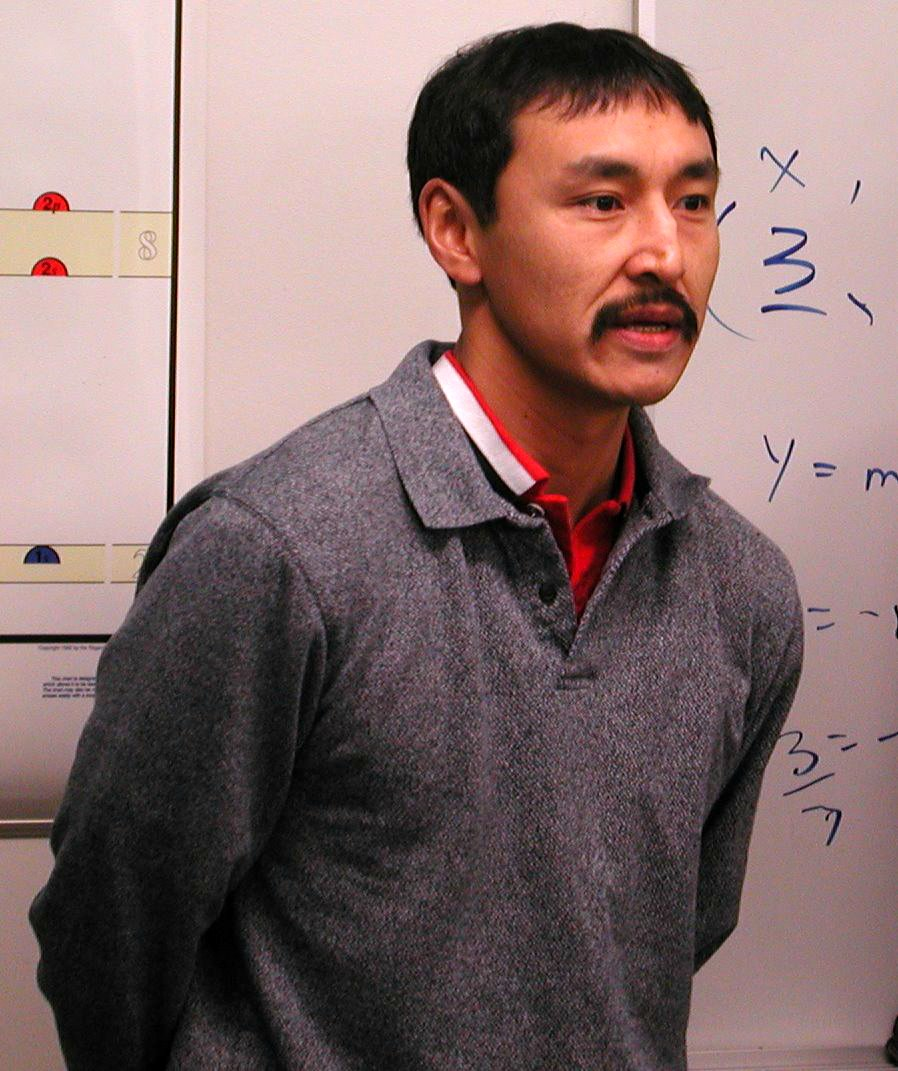
Paul Okalik, first Premier

=== 1999–2013 ===
District	1999 election	2004 election	2008 election
Akulliq	Ovide Alakannuark	Steve Mapsalak	John Ningark
Amittuq	Enoki Irqittuq	Louis Tapardjuk	
Arviat	Kevin O'Brien	David Alagalak	Daniel Shewchuk
Baker Lake	Glenn McLean	David Simailak	Moses Aupaluktuq
Cambridge Bay	Kelvin Ng	Keith Peterson	
Hudson Bay	Peter Kattuk		Allan Rumbolt
Iqaluit Centre	Hunter Tootoo		
Iqaluit East	Ed Picco		Eva Aariak
Iqaluit West	Paul Okalik		
Kugluktuk	Donald Havioyak	Joe Allen Evyagotailak^{[E]}	Peter Taptuna
Nanulik	James Arvaluk^{[A]}	Patterk Netser	Johnny Ningeongan
Nattilik	Uriash Puqiqnak	Leona Aglukkaq^{[F]}	Enuk Pauloosie^{[G]}
Pangnirtung	Peter Kilabuk		Adamee Komoartok
Quttiktuq	Levi Barnabas^{[B]}		Ron Elliott
Rankin Inlet North	Jack Anawak	Tagak Curley	
Rankin Inlet South/Whale Cove	Manitok Thompson	Levinia Brown	Lorne Kusugak
South Baffin	Olayuk Akesuk		Fred Schell
Tununiq	Jobie Nutarak^{[C]}		James Arvaluk
Uqqummiut	David Iqaqrialu	James Arreak	

=== 2013–present ===
District	2013 election	2017 election	2021 election	2025 election
Aggu	Paul Quassa		Joanna Quassa	Edward Attagutaluk
Aivilik	Steve Mapsalak	Patterk Netser	Solomon Malliki	Hannah Angootealuk
Amittuq	George Qulaut	Joelie Kaernerk		Abraham Qammaniq
Arviat North-Whale Cove	George Kuksuk	John Main		
Arviat South	Joe Savikataaq			Jamie Kablutsiak
Baker Lake	Simeon Mikkungwak		Craig Simailak	
Cambridge Bay	Keith Peterson	Jeannie Ehaloak	Pamela Gross	Fred Pedersen
Gjoa Haven	Tony Akoak			David Porter
Hudson Bay	Allan Rumbolt		Daniel Qavvik	
Iqaluit-Manirajak	Monica Ell-Kanayuk	Adam Lightstone		Gwen Healey Akearok
Iqaluit-Niaqunnguu	Pat Angnakak		P.J. Akeeagok	David Akeeagok
Iqaluit-Sinaa	Paul Okalik	Elisapee Sheutiapik	Janet Brewster	
Iqaluit-Tasiluk	George Hickes			
Kugluktuk	Peter Taptuna	Mila Adjukak Kamingoak	Bobby Anavilok	Simon Kuliktana
Netsilik	Jeannie Ugyuk	Emiliano Qirngnuq	Inagayuk Quqqiaq	Cecile Nelvana Lyall
Pangnirtung	Johnny Mike	Margaret Nakashuk		Johnny Mike
Quttiktuq	Isaac Shooyook	David Akeeagok		Steven Taqtu
Rankin Inlet North-Chesterfield Inlet	Tom Sammurtok	Cathy Towtongie	Alexander Sammurtok	
Rankin Inlet South	Alexander Sammurtok	Lorne Kusugak		Annie Tattuinee
South Baffin	David Joanasie			
Tununiq	Joe Enook		Karen Nutarak	Brian Koonoo
Uqqummiut	Samuel Nuqingaq	Pauloosie Keyootak	Mary Killiktee	Gordon Kautuk

== Notes ==
^{A} James Arvaluk resigned his seat in June 2003 after being convicted of assault. He was succeeded in a by-election later that year by Patterk Netser, who retained the seat in the 2004 election.
^{B} Levi Barnabas resigned his seat in August 2000 after being convicted of assault. He was succeeded in a by-election in December 2000 by Rebekah Williams, who lost the seat in the 2004 election to Barnabas.
^{C} Jobie Nutarak died on 23 April 2006. The resulting by-election was held on 16 October 2006 and won by James Arvaluk.
^{E} On 20 August 2008, Evyagotailak stepped down as the MLA. He stated that he wanted to run for the presidency of the Kitikmeot Inuit Association. A by-election was not held.
^{F} On 10 September 2008, Aglukkaq stepped down to run in the 2008 Canadian federal election for the Conservative Party of Canada. A by-election was not held.
^{G} On 22 February 2010, Pauloosie stepped down as the MLA. Although in his resignation letter he did not give a reason, in a subsequent interview with the Canadian Broadcasting Corporation he said that it was "for personal reasons, in part so he could spend more time with his family." A by-election was held 26 April 2010, with Jeannie Ugyuk winning the seat.
