= 4th Nunavut Legislature =

Legislative assembly of Nunavut (2013–2017)

- Consensus parliament
- Nov. 15, 2013 – Sep. 24, 2017

Parliament leaders
- Premier: Peter Taptuna; November 19, 2013 - November 21, 2017
- Members: 22 seats

Sovereign
- Monarch: Elizabeth II; February 6, 1952 – September 8, 2022
- Commissioner: Edna Elias; May 31, 2010 - May 12, 2015
- Nellie Kusugak; May 12, 2015 - June 22, 2020
← 3rd	→ 5th

The 4th Nunavut Legislature began after the 2013 general election on October 29. The election returned 20 of the 22 non-partisan members, with the results in two seats pending judicial recounts or follow-up by-elections due to a tied result on election day. After the official recount held November 5, 2013, the district of Rankin Inlet South was found to be still tied and Uqqummiut was won by two votes.

== Change of premier ==
After the election the Legislative Assembly of Nunavut met to select a new premier of Nunavut. Incumbent premier Eva Aariak was defeated in her district on election day, although she had already indicated that she did not wish to stand for a second term as premier.

== Membership in the 4th assembly ==
A list of members returned in the 2013 general election and subsequent deferred elections.

=== Members elected in October 2013 ===
Riding	Member	First elected / previously elected	No. of terms
Aggu	Paul Quassa	2013	1st term
Aivilik	Steve Mapsalak	2004, 2013	2nd term*
Amittuq	George Qulaut	2013	1st term
Arviat North-Whale Cove	George Kuksuk	2013	1st term
Arviat South	Joe Savikataaq	2013	1st term
Baker Lake	Simeon Mikkungwak	2013	1st term
Cambridge Bay	Keith Peterson	2004	3rd term
Gjoa Haven	Tony Akoak	2013	1st term
Hudson Bay	Allan Rumbolt	2008	2nd term
Iqaluit-Manirajak	Monica Ell-Kanayuk	2011	2nd term
Iqaluit-Niaqunnguu	Pat Angnakak	2013	1st term
Iqaluit-Sinaa	Paul Okalik	1999, (Note: Iqaluit West) 2013	4th term*
Iqaluit-Tasiluk	George Hickes	2013	1st term
Kugluktuk	Peter Taptuna	2008	2nd term
Netsilik	Jeannie Ugyuk	2010	2nd term
Netsilik	Emiliano Qirngnuq (2016)	2016	1st term
Pangnirtung	Johnny Mike	2013	1st term
Quttiktuq	Isaac Shooyook	2013	1st term
Rankin Inlet North-Chesterfield Inlet	Tom Sammurtok	2013	1st term
Rankin Inlet South	Lorne Kusugak	2008	2nd term
Rankin Inlet South	Alexander Sammurtok (2014)	2014	1st term
South Baffin	David Joanasie	2013	1st term
Tununiq	Joe Enook	2011	2nd term
Uqqummiut	Samuel Nuqingaq	2013	1st term
Uqqummiut	Pauloosie Keyootak (2015)	2015	1st term

== Membership changes ==
Nuqingaq was expelled from the legislature on October 24, 2014, after repeatedly engaging in disorderly and inappropriate conduct, vacating Uqqummiut and resulting in a by-election which was held on February 9, 2015. The by-election was won by Pauloosie Keyootak.

Ugyuk, who was chosen as the Family Services Minister, lost a non-confidence vote on November 7, 2015, during a leadership review of the cabinet. As a result of the non-confidence vote a motion was made to remove Ugyuk from cabinet. On November 9, prior to discussion on the motion, Ugyuk resigned both from cabinet and as MLA and the motion was withdrawn. A by-election was held in February 2016, and was won by Emiliano Qirngnuq.
