= 5th Nunavut Legislature =

Legislative assembly of Nunavut (2017–2021)

- Consensus parliament
- Nov. 17, 2017 – Oct. 25, 2021

Parliament leaders
- Premier: Paul Quassa; November 21, 2017 - June 14, 2018
- Joe Savikataaq; June 14, 2018 - November 19, 2021
- Members: 22 seats

Sovereign
- Monarch: Elizabeth II; February 6, 1952 – September 8, 2022
- Commissioner: Nellie Kusugak; May 12, 2015 - June 22, 2020
- Rebekah Uqi Williams (acting); June 22, 2020 - January 14, 2021
- Eva Aariak; January 14, 2021 - present
← 4th	→ 6th

The 5th Nunavut Legislature began after the 2017 general election on October 30. The election returned 22 non-partisan members. In March 2019 the riding of Tununiq was vacated by the death of Joe Enook.

== Change of premier ==
After the election, the Legislative Assembly of Nunavut met on November 17, 2017, to select Paul Quassa as the premier of Nunavut. Incumbent premier Peter Taptuna did not seek re-election.

== Members ==
Riding	Member	First elected / previously elected	No. of terms	Notes
Aggu	Paul Quassa	2013	2nd term	Speaker, former premier
Aivilik	Patterk Netser	2003, (Note: Nanulik) 2017	3rd term*	In cabinet but stripped of portfolios
Amittuq	Joelie Kaernerk	2017	1st term	
Arviat North-Whale Cove	John Main	2017	1st term	
Arviat South	Joe Savikataaq	2013	2nd term	Premier
Baker Lake	Simeon Mikkungwak (resigned February 25, 2020)	2013	2nd term	
Baker Lake	Craig Simailak (elected August 24, 2020)	2020	1st term	
Cambridge Bay	Jeannie Ehaloak	2017	1st term	Cabinet
Gjoa Haven	Tony Akoak	2013	2nd term	
Hudson Bay	Allan Rumbolt	2008	3rd term	
Iqaluit-Manirajak	Adam Lightstone	2017	1st term	
Iqaluit-Niaqunnguu	Pat Angnakak	2013	2nd term	
Iqaluit-Sinaa	Elisapee Sheutiapik	2017	1st term	Cabinet
Iqaluit-Tasiluk	George Hickes	2013	2nd term	Cabinet
Kugluktuk	Mila Adjukak Kamingoak (resigned April 3, 2020)	2017	1st term	
Kugluktuk	Calvin Pedersen (elected August 24, 2020)	2020	1st term	
Netsilik	Emiliano Qirngnuq	2016	2nd term	
Pangnirtung	Margaret Nakashuk	2017	1st term	
Quttiktuq	David Akeeagok	2017	1st term	Cabinet
Rankin Inlet North-Chesterfield Inlet	Cathy Towtongie	2017	1st term	
Rankin Inlet South	Lorne Kusugak	2008, (Note: Rankin Inlet South/Whale Cove) 2017	2nd term*	Cabinet
South Baffin	David Joanasie	2013	2nd term	Cabinet
Tununiq	Joe Enook (died in office March 29, 2019)	2011	3rd term	Enook was speaker at the time of his death
Tununiq	David Qamaniq (from September 16, 2019)	2019	1st term	
Uqqummiut	Pauloosie Keyootak	2015	2nd term	
