= 6th Nunavut Legislature =

Current sitting of the Nunavut Legislature

- Consensus parliament
- Nov. 19, 2021 – Sep. 22, 2025

Parliament leaders
- Premier: P. J. Akeeagok; November 19, 2021 - November 20, 2025
- Members: 22 seats

Sovereign
- Monarch: Elizabeth II; February 6, 1952 – September 8, 2022
- Charles III; September 8, 2022 – present
- Commissioner: Eva Aariak; January 14, 2021 - present
← 5th	→ 7th

The 6th Nunavut Legislature began after the 2021 general election on October 25. The election returned 22 non-partisan members. It was dissolved on September 22, 2025.

== Premier and cabinet ==
After the election, the Legislative Assembly of Nunavut met to select the new premier, P. J. Akeeagok, and cabinet.

== Members ==
Constituency	Member	Portfolio	First elected / previously elected	No. of terms
Aggu	Joanna Quassa	Minister of Culture and Heritage; Minister responsible for Qulliq Energy Corporation; Minister responsible for Languages; Minister responsible for Seniors	2021	1st term
Aivilik	Solomon Malliki		2021	1st term
Amittuq	Joelie Kaernerk (Note: After recount)		2017	2nd term
Arviat North-Whale Cove	John Main (Note: Acclaimed)	Minister of Health; Minister responsible for Suicide Prevention	2017	2nd term
Arviat South	Joe Savikataaq		2013	3rd term
Baker Lake	Craig Simailak		2020	2nd term
Cambridge Bay	Pamela Gross	Deputy Premier; Minister of Education; Minister responsible for Nunavut Arctic College	2021	1st term
Gjoa Haven	Tony Akoak	Speaker	2013	3rd term
Hudson Bay	Daniel Qavvik		2021	1st term
Iqaluit-Manirajak	Adam Lightstone	Minister of Finance; Minister of Human Resources; Minister responsible for Workers Safety and Compensation Commission; Minister responsible for the Liquor Licensing Board	2017	2nd term
Iqaluit-Niaqunnguu	P. J. Akeeagok	Premier; Minister of Executive and Intergovernmental Affairs; Minister of Indigenous Affairs; Minister responsible for Immigration; Minister responsible for the Utility Rate Review Council	2021	1st term
Iqaluit-Sinaa	Janet Brewster		2021	1st term
Iqaluit-Tasiluk	George Hickes		2013	3rd term
Kugluktuk	Bobby Anavilok		2021	1st term
Netsilik	Inagayuk Quqqiaq		2021	1st term
Pangnirtung	Margaret Nakashuk	Minister of Family Services; Minister responsible for Status of Women; Minister responsible for Homelessness; Minister responsible for Poverty Reduction	2017	2nd term
Quttiktuq	David Akeeagok	Minister of Environment; Minister of Justice; Minister responsible for Labour; Minister responsible for Democratic Institutions; Minister responsible for Human Rights Tribunal	2017	2nd term
Rankin Inlet North-Chesterfield Inlet	Alexander Sammurtok		2014, 2021	2nd term*
Rankin Inlet South	Lorne Kusugak	Government House Leader; Minister of Economic Development and Transportation; Minister responsible for the Nunavut Housing Corporation	2008, (Note: Rankin Inlet South/Whale Cove) 2017	3rd term
South Baffin	David Joanasie	Minister of Community and Government Services	2013	3rd term
Tununiq	Karen Nutarak		2021	1st term
Uqqummiut	Mary Killiktee		2021	1st term
