= 7th Nunavut Legislature =

Canadian territorial legislature, 2025

- Nov. 18, 2025 – present

Parliament leaders
- Premier: John Main; Nov. 20, 2025 – present

Legislative Assembly
- Speaker of the Lower House: David Joanasie; Nov. 18, 2025 – present
- Members: 22 seats

Sovereign
- Monarch: Charles III; Sep. 8, 2022 – present
- Commissioner: Eva Aariak; Jan. 14, 2021 – present
← 6th	→ 8th

The 7th Nunavut Legislature began after the 2025 general election on October 27. The election returned 22 non-partisan members.

== Premier and cabinet ==
After the election, the Legislative Assembly of Nunavut met to select the new premier, and cabinet. David Joanasie was elected speaker and John Main was elected premier, defeating David Akeeagok.

== Members ==
Constituency	Member	Portfolio	First elected / previously elected	No. of terms
Aggu	Edward Attagutaluk		2025	1st term
Aivilik	Hannah Angootealuk		2025	1st term
Amittuq	Abraham Qammaniq		2025	1st term
Arviat North-Whale Cove	John Main	Premier; Minister of Finance; Minister of Indigenous affairs Minister of Immigration; Minister of Executive and Intergovernmental Affairs; Minister responsible for Utilities Rights and Review Council; Minister responsible for Seniors; Minister responsible for Nunavut Liquor and Cannabis Commission; Minister responsible for Nunavut Liquor and Cannabis board	2017	3rd term
Arviat South	Jamie Kablutsiak		2025	1st term
Baker Lake	Craig Simailak	Minister of Community Services; Minister responsible for Nunavut Business Credit Corporation; Minister responsible for Nunavut Development Corporation; Minister responsible for Mines; Minister responsible for Trade	2020	3rd term
Cambridge Bay	Fred Pedersen		2025	1st term
Gjoa Haven	David Porter		2025	1st term
Hudson Bay	Daniel Qavvik (resigned June 1, 2026)^{[B]}		2021	2nd term
Hudson Bay	Jason Iqaluq (elected September 28, 2026)		2026	1st term
Iqaluit-Manirajak	Gwen Healey Akearok	Minister of Family Services; Minister of Qulliq Energy Corporation; Minister responsible for Status of Women; Minister responsible for Homelessness; Minister responsible for Poverty Reduction	2025	1st term
Iqaluit-Niaqunnguu	David Akeeagok	Government House Leader; Minister of Education; Minister responsible for Nunavut Arctic College	2017	3rd term
Iqaluit-Sinaa	Janet Brewster	Minister of Health; Minister responsible for Suicide Prevention	2021	2nd term
Iqaluit-Tasiluk	George Hickes	Deputy Premier; Minister of Justice; Minister of Transportation and Infrastructure Nunavut; Minister of Labour; Minister responsible Human Rights Tribunal	2013	4th term
Kugluktuk	Simon Kuliktana		2025	1st term
Netsilik	Cecile Nelvana Lyall	Minister responsible for Nunavut Housing Corporation	2025	1st term
Pangnirtung	Johnny Mike		2013, 2025	2nd term
Quttiktuq	Steven Taqtu		2025	1st term
Rankin Inlet North-Chesterfield Inlet	Alexander Sammurtok		2014, 2021	3rd term
Rankin Inlet South	Annie Tattuinee	Minister of Human Resources; Minister of Workers' Safety and Compensation Commission	2025	1st term
South Baffin	David Joanasie^{[B]}	Speaker of the Legislative Assembly of Nunavut	2013	4th term
Tununiq	Brian Koonoo	Minister of Culture and Heritage; Minister of Environment; Minister of Languages; Minister responsible for Energy	2025	1st term
Uqqummiut	Gordon Kautuk		2025	1st term

== Notes ==
^{B} Acclaimed
