= 2021 Nunavut general election =

Canadian territorial election

- October 25, 2021

22 seats in the Legislative Assembly of Nunavut
- Turnout: 49.9% (▼13.4%pp)
Premier before election
Joe Savikataaq
Premier after election
P. J. Akeeagok

The 2021 Nunavut general election was held on October 25, 2021, to return the members of the 6th Nunavut Legislature. Since the adoption of a fixed election date law in 2014, general elections in Nunavut are held in the last Monday of October in the fourth calendar year following the last elections. The Legislative Assembly of Nunavut can be dissolved earlier by the commissioner of Nunavut on the advice of the premier of Nunavut.

Unlike most legislatures in Canada, the Legislative Assembly of Nunavut operates on a non-partisan consensus government model. Candidates in territorial elections run as independents rather than being nominated by political parties. The premier and executive council are then selected internally by the MLAs at the first special sitting of the new legislative session.

The election was held using single-member districts, and successful candidates were determined through the first past the post system.

== Candidates ==
The following are the results. (X) indicates the incumbent

=== Aggu ===
Candidate	Vote	%
Joanna Quassa	96	52.8%
Methusalah Kunuk	86	47.3%
Blank/invalid	0	0.0
Total	182	100%
Registered/turnout	522	34.87

=== Aivilik ===
Candidate	Vote	%
Solomon Malliki	134	27.7%
Patterk Netser (X)	111	23.0%
Johnny Ningeongan	85	17.6%
Helena Malliki	77	15.9%
Lucassie Padlayat Nakoolak	76	15.7%
Blank/invalid	-	–
Total	483	100%
Registered/turnout		

=== Amittuq ===
Candidate	Vote	%
Joelie Kaernerk (X)	170	50.4%
Solomon Allurut	167	49.6%
Blank/invalid	-	–
Total	337	100%
Registered/turnout		

=== Arviat North-Whale Cove ===
Candidate	Vote	%
John Main (X)	Acclaimed	

=== Arviat South ===
Candidate	Vote	%
Joe Savikataaq (X)	Acclaimed	

=== Baker Lake ===
Candidate	Vote	%
Craig Atangalaaq Simailak (X)	327	73.3%
Elijah Amarook	71	15.9%
Daniel Piryuaq	48	10.8%
Blank/invalid	-	–
Total	466	100%
Registered/turnout		

=== Cambridge Bay ===
Candidate	Vote	%
Pamela Hakongak Gross	224	34.6%
Jeannie Hakongak Ehaloak (X)	215	33.2%
Peter Ohokak	209	32.3%
Blank/invalid	-	–
Total	648	100%
Registered/turnout		

=== Gjoa Haven ===
Candidate	Vote	%
Tony Akoak (X)	143	39.8%
Allen Aglukkaq	89	24.8%
Paul Tunik Puqiqnak	77	21.5%
Veronica Ullulaq	36	10.0%
Gregory A. Nahaglulik	14	3.9%
Blank/invalid	-	–
Total	359	100%
Registered/turnout		

=== Hudson Bay ===
Candidate	Vote	%
Daniel Qavvik	227	70.7%
Mick Appaqaq	86	26.8%
Ronald Ladd	8	2.5%
Blank/invalid	-	–
Total	321	100%
Registered/turnout		

=== Iqaluit-Manirajak ===
Candidate	Vote	%
Adam Lightstone (X)	306	65.4%
Joanasie Akumalik	162	34.6%
Blank/invalid	-	–
Total	468	100%
Registered/turnout		

=== Iqaluit-Niaqunnguu ===
Candidate	Vote	%
P. J. Akeeagok	404	84.3%
Noah Papatsie	54	11.3%
Dinos Tikivik	21	4.4%
Blank/invalid	-	–
Total	479	100%
Registered/turnout		

=== Iqaluit-Sinaa ===
Candidate	Vote	%
Janet Pitsiulaaq Brewster	97	37.0%
Jeff Ungalaq Maurice	90	34.4%
Christa Kunuk	75	28.6%
Blank/invalid	-	–
Total	262	100%
Registered/turnout		

=== Iqaluit-Tasiluk ===
Candidate	Vote	%
George Hickes (X)	265	51.0%
James T. Arreak	133	25.6%
Michael Salomonie	81	15.6%
Jonathan Chul-Hee Min Park	41	7.9%
Blank/invalid	-	–
Total	520	100%
Registered/turnout		

=== Kugluktuk ===
Candidate	Vote	%
Bobby Anavilok	170	38.8%
Calvin Aivgak Pedersen (X)	140	32.0%
Angele Kuliktana	77	17.6%
Genevieve Nivingalok	51	11.6%
Blank/invalid	-	–
Total	438	100%
Registered/turnout		

=== Netsilik ===
Candidate	Vote	%
Inagayuk Joseph Quqqiaq	222	45.1%
Emiliano Qirngnuq (X)	187	38.0%
Simon Qingnaqtuq	83	16.9%
Blank/invalid	-	–
Total	492	100%
Registered/turnout		

=== Pangnirtung ===
Candidate	Vote	%
Margaret Nakashuk (X)	Acclaimed	

=== Quttiktuq ===
Candidate	Vote	%
David Akeeagok (X)	Acclaimed	

=== Rankin Inlet North-Chesterfield Inlet ===
Candidate	Vote	%
Alexander Sammurtok	147	46.8%
Q. Cathy Towtongie (X)	124	39.5%
Albert Aokaut	43	13.7%
Blank/invalid	-	–
Total	314	100%
Registered/turnout		

=== Rankin Inlet South ===
Candidate	Vote	%
Lorne Kusugak (X)	198	52.4%
Tagak Curley	98	25.9%
Bobby Oolooyuk	82	21.7%
Blank/invalid	-	–
Total	378	100%
Registered/turnout		

=== South Baffin ===
Candidate	Vote	%
David Joanasie (X)	Acclaimed	

=== Tununiq ===
Candidate	Vote	%
Karen Nutarak	259	55.5%
David Qayaakuttuk Qamaniq (X)	146	31.3%
Joshua Arreak	62	13.3%
Blank/invalid	-	–
Total	467	100%
Registered/turnout		

=== Uqqummiut ===
Candidate	Vote	%
Mary Killiktee	261	63.8%
Sheila Enook	148	36.2%
Blank/invalid	-	–
Total	409	100%
Registered/turnout		
