= 2025 Nunavut general election =

Canadian territorial election

- October 27, 2025

22 seats in the Legislative Assembly of Nunavut
- Turnout: 37% (▼12.9%pp)
Premier before election
P.J. Akeeagok
Premier after election
John Main

The 2025 Nunavut general election was held on October 27, 2025, to return the members of the 7th Nunavut Legislature. Since the adoption of a fixed election date law in 2014, general elections in Nunavut are held in the last Monday of October in the fourth calendar year following the last elections. The Legislative Assembly of Nunavut was dissolved by the commissioner of Nunavut on September 22.

The election recorded a voter turnout of 37%, the lowest in territorial history.

== Background ==
Unlike most legislatures in Canada, the Legislative Assembly of Nunavut operates on a non-partisan consensus government model. Candidates in territorial elections run as independents rather than being nominated by political parties. The premier and executive council are then selected internally by the MLAs at the first special sitting of the new legislative session. The election will be held using single-member districts, and successful candidates will be determined through the first past the post system.

New electoral boundaries were introduced in this election.

In July 2025, incumbent premier P.J. Akeeagok announced he would not seek re-election. The deadline for candidate registration was September 26, 2025. 2 seats saw their MLAs acclaimed. Issues in the election included housing and the rising cost-of-living.

=== Incumbents not standing for re-election ===
Member of the Legislative Assembly	Electoral District	Date announced
P.J. Akeeagok	Iqaluit-Niaqunnguu	July 8, 2025
Tony Akoak	Gjoa Haven	September 19, 2025
Joelie Kaernerk	Amittuq	September 19, 2025
Lorne Kusugak	Rankin Inlet South	September 19, 2025
Margaret Nakashuk	Pangnirtung	September 19, 2025
Karen Nutarak	Tununiq	September 19, 2025
Joe Savikataaq	Arviat South	September 19, 2025

== Candidates by district ==
(X) indicates the incumbent

Candidates in italics have been elected. Joanna Quassa, Johnny Mike, and Steven Taqtu all received a majority of less than 2 per cent over the next candidate triggering an automatic judicial recount. Mike and Taqtu were elected, while Quassa's seat became tied, triggering a by-election in Aggu.

=== Aggu ===
Candidate	Vote	%
Joanna Quassa (X)	105	50
Erasmus Ivvalu	105	50
Blank/invalid	8	–
Total	218	100
Registered/turnout	535	40.75

=== Aivilik ===
Candidate	Vote	%
Hannah Angootealuk	298	63.5
Solomon Malliki (X)	164	35
Blank/invalid	7	–
Total	469	100
Registered/turnout	963	48.70

=== Amittuq ===
Candidate	Vote	%
Abraham Qammaniq	148	41.1
Reena Irqittuq	80	22.2
Paul Haulli	74	20.6
Roger Beaudry	58	16.1
Blank/invalid	1	–
Total	361	100
Registered/turnout	662	54.53

=== Arviat North-Whale Cove ===
Candidate	Vote	%
John Main (X)	229	57
Tony Uluadluak	173	43
Blank/invalid	3	–
Total	405	100
Registered/turnout	817	49.57

=== Arviat South ===
Candidate	Vote	%
Jamie Kablutsiak	255	67.8
Alana Kuksuk	120	31.9
Blank/invalid	1	–
Total	376	100
Registered/turnout	710	52.96

=== Baker Lake ===
Candidate	Vote	%
Craig Atangalaaq Simailak (X)	268	52.5
Simeon Mikkungwak	242	47.5
Blank/invalid	2	–
Total	512	100
Registered/turnout	1057	48.44

=== Cambridge Bay ===
Candidate	Vote	%
Fred Pedersen	330	55
Pamela Hakongak Gross (X)	176	29.3
Peter Ohokak	94	15.7
Blank/invalid	5	–
Total	605	100
Registered/turnout	1046	57.84

=== Gjoa Haven ===
Candidate	Vote	%
David Porter	132	36
Meghan Porter	124	33.8
Agoakteak Gregory Nahaglulik	51	13.9
David Akoak	49	13.4
Sonny Porter	11	3
Blank/invalid	2	–
Total	369	100
Registered/turnout	697	52.94

=== Hudson Bay ===
Candidate	Result
Daniel Qavvik (X)	Acclaimed

=== Iqaluit-Manirajak ===
Candidate	Vote	%
Gwen Healey Akearok	245	63.3
Adam Lightstone (X)	142	36.7
Blank/invalid	12	–
Total	399	100
Registered/turnout	1065	37.46

=== Iqaluit-Niaqunnguu ===
Candidate	Vote	%
David Akeeagok (Note: Akeeagok has been the MLA for Quttiktuq since 2017, but is switiching districts to Iqaluit-Niaqunnguu.)	270	52.9
Tatanniq Lucie Idlout	124	24.3
Jacopoosie Peter	73	14.3
Walter Picco	43	8.4
Blank/invalid	24	–
Total	534	100
Registered/turnout	1180	45.25

=== Iqaluit-Sinaa ===
Candidate	Vote	%
Janet Brewster (X)	175	53.8
Robin Anawak	150	46.2
Blank/invalid	0	–
Total	325	100
Registered/turnout	1000	32.5

=== Iqaluit-Tasiluk ===
Candidate	Vote	%
George Hickes (X)	354	71.7
Malaiya Lucassie	140	28.3
Blank/invalid	5	–
Total	499	100
Registered/turnout	1088	45.86

=== Kugluktuk ===
Candidate	Vote	%
Simon Kuliktana	218	60.7
Stanley Anablak	93	25.9
Bobby Anavilok (X)	48	13.4
Blank/invalid	2	–
Total	361	100
Registered/turnout	775	46.58

=== Netsilik ===
Candidate	Vote	%
Cecile Nelvana Lyall	294	46.3
Emiliano Qirngnuq	253	40
Joseph Inagayuk Quqqiaq (X)	63	10
Johnny Qilluniq	20	3.2
Mary Anaumiq Neeveacheak	0	0
Blank/invalid	3	–
Total	633	100
Registered/turnout	962	65.80

=== Pangnirtung ===
Candidate	Vote	%
Johnny Mike	127	36.7
Nathaniel Julai Alikatuktuk	123	35.5
Andrew Nakashuk	92	26.6
Blank/invalid	4	–
Total	346	100
Registered/turnout	744	46.51

=== Quttiktuq ===
Candidate	Vote	%
Steven Taqtu	121	47.8
Philip Kalluk	107	42.3
Andrew Taqtu	20	7.9
Blank/invalid	5	–
Total	253	100
Registered/turnout	589	42.95

=== Rankin Inlet North-Chesterfield Inlet ===
Candidate	Vote	%
Alexander Sammurtok (X)	151	52.3
Cathy Towtongie	134	46.4
Blank/invalid	4	–
Total	289	100
Registered/turnout	788	36.68

=== Rankin Inlet South ===
Candidate	Vote	%
Annie Tattuinee	183	58.8
Gerry Anawak	70	22.5
Tagak Curley	58	18.6
Blank/invalid	1	–
Total	312	100
Registered/turnout	724	43.09

=== South Baffin ===
Candidate	Result
David Joanasie (X)	Acclaimed

=== Tununiq ===
Candidate	Vote	%
Brian Koonoo	194	50.9
Verna Strickland	109	28.6
David Qamaniq	78	20.5
Blank/invalid	3	–
Total	384	48.48
Registered/turnout	792	

=== Uqqummiut ===
Candidate	Vote	%
Gordon Kautuk	402	75.3
Mary Killiktee (X)	132	24.7
Blank/invalid	6	–
Total	540	100
Registered/turnout	869	62.14

== Aftermath ==
Two ridings acclaimed their MLA, since only one candidate registered: Daniel Qavvik in Hudson Bay and David Joanasie in South Baffin, both incumbents.

Three ridings faced judicial recounts because the difference between the first- and second-place finishers was less than 2% of the votes cast: Aggu, where incumbent Joanna Quassa had an initial count of 106 votes to Erasmus Ivvalu's 103; Pangnirtung, where former MLA Johnny Mike had 125 votes to Nathaniel Julai Alikatuktuk's 122; and Quttiktuq, where Steven Taqtu had 113 votes to Philip Kalluk's 109.

In the election, 13 out of the 22 seats in the legislature elected new MLAs. Given that the territory operates on a consensus government system, MLAs elected on October 27 chose the new premier, cabinet, and speaker in the first session of the 7th Assembly on November 18. David Joanasie was elected speaker and John Main was elected premier, defeating David Akeeagok.

=== Results ===
Reelection statistics
	Seats	Did not run	Defeated	Reelected
Cabinet	9	3	2	3
Opposition	13	4	4	5
All MLAs	22	7	6	8

== See also ==
- 2025 Canadian federal election in the territories
