= 2017 Nunavut general election =

Canadian territorial election

- October 30, 2017

22 seats in the Legislative Assembly of Nunavut
- Turnout: 63.3%(▼7.0pp)
Premier before election
Peter Taptuna
Premier after election
Paul Quassa

The 2017 Nunavut general election was held on October 30, 2017, to return the members of the 5th Nunavut Legislature. The fifth general election held since the creation of the territory in 1999, it was the first election held under Nunavut's new fixed election dates law, which requires elections to be held no more than four years after the prior election.

Unlike most federal or provincial elections in Canada, elections to the Legislative Assembly of Nunavut are conducted on a non-partisan consensus government model, in which all candidates run as independents rather than being nominated by political parties. The premier and executive council are then selected internally by the MLAs at the first special sitting of the legislature.

== Candidates ==
As of the close of nominations on September 29, 2017, three MLAs, Steve Mapsalak, Keith Peterson and Premier Peter Taptuna were the only incumbents not running again. One district, Kugluktuk, saw only one candidate register by the close of nominations; that candidate, Mila Adjukak Kamingoak, was immediately declared as acclaimed to office.

In one district, Cambridge Bay, formal declaration of the winner was not made until November 5, with the initial results undergoing an automatic recount due to a margin of less than two per cent between the top two finishers. The recount confirmed that the original count was correct.

== Follow up ==
A record number of women were elected to the legislature; in addition to Kamingoak's acclamation, four more women were declared elected on election night, and a woman won the recount in Cambridge Bay. These six women, representing 27 per cent of the legislature, represent the first time in the territory's history that it has ranked higher than last or second-last among Canada's provinces and territories for female membership in the legislature.

Following the election, only three of the eight incumbent cabinet ministers had been reelected: three were defeated and two, including Premier Peter Taptuna, chose not to run again. Overall, half of the legislature's 22 incumbents were reelected.

On November 17, 2017, the Nunavut Leadership Forum convened in Iqaluit to choose the next premier. MLAs Joe Savikataaq, Cathy Towtongie, Patterk Netser, and Paul Quassa put their names forward; ultimately, Quassa was elected premier, and Joe Enook was chosen as Speaker. The Executive Council was to consist of David Akeeagok, Pat Angnakak, Jeannie Ehaloak, David Joanasie, Lorne Kusugak, Savikataaq, and Elisapee Sheutiapik.

In 2018, however, Quassa lost a confidence vote in the legislature, and was succeeded as premier by Savikataaq.

== Results ==
The Legislative Assembly is run on a consensus government system, in which all MLAs sit as independents and are not organized into political parties. Note, accordingly, that colours in the following charts are used solely to indicate candidate status, not political party affiliations.

=== Statistics ===
Reelection statistics
	Seats	**Did not run again**	**Defeated**	**Reelected**
All MLAs	22	3 (13.6%)	8 (36.3%)	11 (50.0%)
Cabinet ministers	8	2 (25.0%)	3 (37.5%)	3 (37.5%)

=== Candidates ===
Candidates by district
District	Communities	Winner	Second	Third	Fourth	Others	Incumbent Bold denotes cabinet ministers
Aggu	Igloolik (north part)	**Paul Quassa**; 106	Matt Teed; 96	Richard Amarualik; 79	Jerome Sheaves; 14		**Paul Quassa**; Reelected
Aivilik	Coral Harbour, Naujaat	**Patterk Netser**; 318	Jack Anawak; 218				Steve Mapsalak; Did not run again
Amittuq	Igloolik (south part), Hall Beach	**Joelie Kaernerk**; 115	Paul Haulli; 84	George Qulaut; 69	Reena Akumalik Irqittuq; 46	Jason Ikeperiar: 41; Solomon Angugasak Allurut: 39; Erasmus Ivvalu: 22	George Qulaut; Defeated
Arviat North-Whale Cove	Arviat (north part), Whale Cove	**John Main**; 408	George Kuksuk; 115				**George Kuksuk**; Defeated
Arviat South	Arviat (south part)	**Joe Savikataaq**; 280	Jason Gibbons; 234				**Joe Savikataaq**; Reelected
Baker Lake	Baker Lake	**Simeon Mikkungwak**; 389	Karen Kabloona; 280				Simeon Mikkungwak; Reelected
Cambridge Bay	Cambridge Bay	**Jeannie Ehaloak**; 259	Pamela Gross; 250	Harry Maksagak; 126			**Keith Peterson**; Did not run again
Gjoa Haven	Gjoa Haven	**Tony Akoak**; 171	James Taqaugaq Qitsualik; 133	Paul Puqiqnak; 79	Joseph Aglukkaq; 53		Tony Akoak; Reelected
Hudson Bay	Sanikiluaq	**Allan Rumbolt**; 131	Peter Qavvik; 112	Peter Kattuk; 105			Allan Rumbolt; Reelected
Iqaluit-Manirajak	Iqaluit (west part)	**Adam Lightstone**; 253	Monica Ell-Kanayuk; 227	Jude Lewis; 81	Okalik Eegeesiak; 64		**Monica Ell-Kanayuk**; Defeated
Iqaluit-Niaqunnguu	Iqaluit (east part)	**Pat Angnakak**; 231	Franco Buscemi; 196	Anne Crawford; 134			Pat Angnakak; Reelected
Iqaluit-Sinaa	Iqaluit (south part)	**Elisapee Sheutiapik**; 237	Paul Okalik; 150	Cindy Rennie; 86	Adamee Itorcheak; 56		Paul Okalik; Defeated
Iqaluit-Tasiluk	Iqaluit (north part)	**George Hickes**; 449	Jacopoosie Peter; 121				**George Hickes**; Reelected
Kugluktuk	Kugluktuk	**Mila Adjukak Kamingoak** acclaimed					**Peter Taptuna**; Did not run again
Netsilik	Taloyoak, Kugaaruk	**Emiliano Qirngnuq**; 310	Joe Tulurialik; 141				Emiliano Qirngnuq; Reelected
Pangnirtung	Pangnirtung	**Margaret Nakashuk**; 266	Harry John Dialla; 129	Johnny Mike; 93	Hezakiah Oshutapik; 31		**Johnny Mike**; Defeated
Quttiktuq	Arctic Bay, Grise Fiord, Resolute	**David Akeeagok**; 189	Mishak Allurut; 78	Isaac Shooyook; 45	Kataisee Attagutsiak; 44	Leo Eecherk: 34; Andrew Taqtu: 9 Mavis Manik: 6 Gary Kalluk: 2 Rachel Qitsualik-Tinsley: 0	Isaac Shooyook; Defeated
Rankin Inlet North-Chesterfield Inlet	Rankin Inlet (north part), Chesterfield Inlet	**Cathy Towtongie**; 171	Cedric Autut; 147	Tom Sammurtok; 93	Douglas Aggark; 58		Tom Sammurtok; Defeated
Rankin Inlet South	Rankin Inlet (south part)	**Lorne Kusugak**; 309	Alexander Sammurtok; 136				Alexander Sammurtok; Defeated
South Baffin	Cape Dorset, Kimmirut	**David Joanasie**; 318	Michael Salomonie; 201				David Joanasie; Reelected
Tununiq	Pond Inlet	**Joe Enook**; 258	David Qamaniq; 146	Jeannie Mills; 102			Joe Enook; Reelected
Uqqummiut	Clyde River, Qikiqtarjuaq	**Pauloosie Keyootak**; 235	Jerry Natanine; 191	Johnathan Palluq; 118			Pauloosie Keyootak; Reelected

As of November 1, all results are unofficial.
