= 2013 Nunavut general election =

Canadian territorial election

- October 28, 2013

22 seats in the Legislative Assembly of Nunavut
- Turnout: 70.3% (▼1.7pp)
- Popular vote by riding. As Nunavut elections are on a non-partisan basis, all candidate run as independents. The Kugluktuk and Netsilik ridings (black) were elected by acclamation.
Premier before election
Eva Aariak
Premier after election
Peter Taptuna

The 2013 Nunavut general election was held October 28, 2013, to elect 22 members to the 4th Legislative Assembly of Nunavut. In November 2012 the assembly passed the Nunavut Elections Act 2012, stating that the writs for election drop September 23, 2013, and an election be held October 28, 2013, the proclamation was registered November 9, 2012. At the 2013 forum, held on November 15, 2013, Peter Taptuna was selected as the new Premier of Nunavut.

== Election summary ==
Election summary	# of candidates	
Election summary	Incumbent	New
Elected candidates	4	15
Acclaimed candidates	2	-
Tied candidates	1	1
Defeated candidates	5	45
Total	73	

== Redistribution ==
The number of electoral districts were increased to 22 from 19. This is the first redistribution of boundaries since the territory was created in 1999.

== New premier and MLAs ==
On September 5, 2013, Premier Eva Aariak announced that she would stand for reelection but would not run for the position of premier after the election, paving the way for the 3rd Premier of Nunavut to be chosen. Despite wanting to seek a new position in the Legislature she was defeated in the general election marking the fourth provincial / territorial election in a row that an incumbent Premier has been defeated in his or her riding. (She was preceded by Darrell Dexter in Nova Scotia, Christy Clark in B.C. and Jean Charest in Quebec). A total of seven incumbents did not run for re-election.

In total 73 people registered with Elections Nunavut as candidates. Of these 73 candidates, 12 were incumbents hoping for reelection, and five have been elected in previous territorial elections, four to Nunavut and one to the Legislative Assembly of the Northwest Territories and 56 have not been elected in a territorial election before.

Two ridings were won by acclamation and both of these were returning MLAs. A total of eight ridings were contested solely by candidates who have not been elected in a previous territorial election.

Of the seven incumbent cabinet ministers, two chose not to re-offer, two were defeated (one in a by-election following a tie), and three were reelected (one by acclamation).

== Candidates ==
Turnout by riding

Following is a list of candidates that had filed with Elections Nunavut by 2:00 pm (local time), September 27, 2013. Bold represents winning candidate. All results from Elections Nunavut.

There were ties in two districts. In Rankin Inlet South, incumbent MLA Lorne Kusugak and challenger Alexander Sammurtok were tied with 172 votes. An official recount was held November 5 and was still found to be a tie. A by-election was scheduled for February 10, 2014, which was won by Sammurtok. In Uqqummiut, Niore Iqalukjuak and Samuel Nuqingaq were tied with 197 votes. After the official recount held November 5 Nuqingaq was found to have two more votes than Iqalukjuak.

Candidates by district
District	Communities	Winner	Second	Third	Fourth	Fifth	Sixth	Changes	Incumbent
Aggu	Igloolik (north part)	**Paul Quassa**; 96	John Illupalik; 83	Daniel Uyarak; 42				New district	n/a^{(A)}
Aivilik	Repulse Bay, Coral Harbour	**Steve Mapsalak**; 263	Johnny Ningeongan; 187					New district	n/a^{(B)}^{(C)}
Amittuq	Igloolik (south part), Hall Beach	**George Qulaut**; 244	Paul Haulli; 103					Boundaries redrawn	Louis Tapardjuk^{(L)}
Arviat North-Whale Cove	Arviat (north part), Whale Cove	**George Kuksuk**; 160	Elizabeth Copland; 146	David Kritterdlik; 71	Amauyak Netser; 66	Joseph Ivitaaruq Kaviok; 19		New district	n/a^{(D)}^{(E)}
Arviat South	Arviat (south part)	**Joe Savikataaq**; 181	Airo Pameolik; 147	Peter Alareak; 125				New district	n/a^{(D)}
Baker Lake	Baker Lake	**Simeon Mikkungwak**; 392	Karen Yip; 269					Unchanged	Moses Aupaluktuq^{(L)}
Cambridge Bay	Cambridge Bay	**Keith Peterson**; 443	Fred Pedersen; 120	Clara Hokayak Evalik; 82				Unchanged	Keith Peterson
Gjoa Haven	Gjoa Haven	**Tony Akoak**; 210	Linda Hunter; 161	George Sonny Porter; 46	Andrew Porter; 17			New district	n/a^{(F)}
Hudson Bay	Sanikiluaq	**Allan Rumbolt**; 139	Moses Appaqaq; 97	Frank Audla; 63	Lucy Uppik; 15			Unchanged	Allan Rumbolt
Iqaluit-Manirajak	Iqaluit (west part)	**Monica Ell-Kanayuk**; 330	Mikidjuk Akavak; 72	Lewis Lehman; 57	Paulie Sammurtok; 19			New district	n/a^{(G)}
Iqaluit-Niaqunnguu	Iqaluit (east part)	**Pat Angnakak**; 151	Anne Crawford; 131	Methusalah Kunuk; 81	Jack Anawak; 66	Duncan Cunningham; 41	Sytukie Joamie; 6	New district	n/a^{(G)}
Iqaluit-Sinaa	Iqaluit (south part)	**Paul Okalik**; 180	Leesee Papatsie; 97	Solomon Awa; 69	Natsiq Kango; 42			New district	n/a^{(G)}
Iqaluit-Tasiluk	Iqaluit (north part)	**George Hickes**; 237	Eva Aariak; 194	Patterk Netser; 85	Travis Cooper; 69	Gideonie Joamie; 28		New district	n/a^{(G)}
Kugluktuk	Kugluktuk	**Peter Taptuna**; Acclaimed						Unchanged	Peter Taptuna
Netsilik	Taloyoak, Kugaaruk	**Jeannie Ugyuk**; Acclaimed						New district	n/a^{(H)}^{(I)}
Pangnirtung	Pangnirtung	**Johnny Mike**; 198	Harry J Dialla; 183	Sakiasie Sowdlooapik; 82	Hezakiah Oshutapik; 67			Unchanged	Hezakiah Oshutapik
Quttiktuq	Arctic Bay, Grise Fiord, Resolute	**Isaac Shooyook**; 232	Ron Elliott; 152					Unchanged	Ron Elliott
Rankin Inlet North-Chesterfield Inlet	Rankin Inlet (north part), Chesterfield Inlet	**Tom Sammurtok**; 212	Donna Adams; 94	Qilak Kusugak; 89	Harry Niakrok; 68			New district	n/a^{(J)}^{(K)}
Rankin Inlet South; See also #By-election below	Rankin Inlet (south part)	Lorne Kusugak; 172; Alexander Sammurtok; 172						New district	n/a^{(J)}
South Baffin	Cape Dorset, Kimmirut	**David Joanasie**; 409	Tommy Akavak; 160	Mathew Saveakjuk Jaw; 51	Fred Schell; 43	Joannie Ikkidluak; 40		Unchanged	Fred Schell
Tununiq	Pond Inlet	**Joe Enook**; 359	David Qajaakuttuk Qamaniq; 132					Unchanged	Joe Enook
Uqqummiut	Clyde River, Qikiqtarjuaq	**Samuel Nuqingaq**; 187	Niore Iqalukjuak; 185	Loseosie Paneak; 62	Apiusie Apak; 49	Charlie Kalluk; 26		Unchanged	James Arreak^{(L)}

=== Notes ===
^(A) Igloolik was represented by Louis Tapardjuk (Amittuq)
^(B) Repulse Bay was represented by John Ningark (Akulliq)
^(C) Coral Harbour was represented by Johnny Ningeongan (Nanulik)
^(D) Arviat was represented by Daniel Shewchuk (Arviat)
^(E) Whale Cove was represented by Lorne Kusugak (Rankin Inlet South/Whale Cove)
^(F) Gjoa Haven was represented by Jeannie Ugyuk (Nattilik)
^(G) Iqaluit was represented by Eva Aariak (Iqaluit East), Monica Ell (Iqaluit West) and Hunter Tootoo (Iqaluit Centre)
^(H) Taloyoak was represented by Jeannie Ugyuk (Nattilik)
^(I) Kugaaruk was represented by John Ningark (Akulliq)
^(J) Rankin Inlet was represented by Tagak Curley (Rankin Inlet North) and Lorne Kusugak (Rankin Inlet South/Whale Cove)
^(K) Chesterfield Inlet was represented by Johnny Ningeongan (Nanulik)
^(L) Not running in 2013

=== Fate of incumbents ===
Bold indicates a cabinet member.

Incumbent	Riding at dissolution	New riding	Result
**Eva Aariak**	Iqaluit East	Iqaluit-Tasiluk	Defeated
**James Arreak**	Uqqummiut	n/a	Did not run again
Moses Aupaluktuq	Baker Lake	n/a	Did not run again
Tagak Curley	Rankin Inlet North	n/a	Did not run again
**Monica Ell-Kanayuk**	Iqaluit West	Iqaluit-Manirajak	Reelected
Ron Elliott	Quttiktuq	Quttiktuq	Defeated
Joe Enook	Tununiq	Tununiq	Reelected
**Lorne Kusugak**	Rankin Inlet South/Whale Cove	Rankin Inlet South	Tied; defeated in subsequent by-election
John Ningark	Akulliq	n/a	Did not run again
Johnny Ningeongan	Nanulik	Aivilik	Defeated
Hezakiah Oshutapik	Pangnirtung	Pangnirtung	Defeated
**Keith Peterson**	Cambridge Bay	Cambridge Bay	Reelected
Allan Rumbolt	Hudson Bay	Hudson Bay	Reelected
Fred Schell	South Baffin	South Baffin	Defeated
**Daniel Shewchuk**	Arviat	n/a	Did not run again
Louis Tapardjuk	Amittuq	n/a	Did not run again
**Peter Taptuna**	Kugluktuk	Kugluktuk	Reelected (acclaimed)
Hunter Tootoo	Iqaluit Centre	n/a	Did not run again
Jeannie Ugyuk	Nattilik	Netsilik	Reelected (acclaimed)

=== Retiring incumbents ===
The following incumbents have announced that they will not be running in the 2013 election.

Incumbent	District	Role	Reason
James Arreak	Uqqummiut	Cabinet minister	Undisclosed reasons
Moses Aupaluktuq	Baker Lake	Regular member	Spend more time with family
Tagak Curley	Rankin Inlet North	Regular member	Spend more time with family
John Ningark	Akulliq	Regular member	Undisclosed reasons
Daniel Shewchuk	Arviat	Cabinet minister	Undisclosed reasons
Louis Tapardjuk	Amittuq	Regular member	Undisclosed reasons
Hunter Tootoo	Iqaluit Centre	Speaker	Undisclosed reasons

=== By-election ===
With the tie in Rankin Inlet South confirmed by a judicial recount, a new by-election was scheduled on February 10, 2014.

Rankin Inlet South by-election on February 10, 2014
Name	Vote	%
Alexander Sammurtok	268	54.3%
Lorne Kusugak	225	45.7%
**Total Valid Ballots**	**493**	**100%**
Voter Turnout	Rejected Ballots	
