= Sammurtok =

Sammurtok is an Inuit surname. Notable people with the surname include:

- Alexander Sammurtok (born 1952/1953), Canadian politician
- Tom Sammurtok (born 1946/1947), Canadian politician, uncle of Alexander
