= Elections Nunavut =

- ᓄᓇᕗᒻᒥ ᓂᕈᐊᖅᑐᓕᕆᔨᒃᑯᑦ

Agency overview
- Formed: 2003
- Jurisdiction: Elections and plebiscites in Nunavut
- Headquarters: 41 Sivulliq Avenue; Rankin Inlet
- Employees: 5
- Annual budget: $2.83 million (2017-2018)
- Agency executive: Kiran Situt, Chief Electoral Officer
- Website: www.elections.nu.ca

Elections Nunavut is an independent agency that oversees elections and plebiscites in Nunavut, including:

- all general elections and by-elections for the 22 members of the Legislative Assembly of Nunavut, according to the Nunavut Elections Act
- all municipal elections, including mayor and council, and the district education authorities for all municipalities in Nunavut
- all plebiscites conducted according to Nunavut's Plebiscites Act
- any plebiscites that relate to the control or prohibition of liquor in Nunavut communities, according to Nunavut's Liquor Act, and when the minister of finance requests

The Legislative Assembly of Nunavut appoints the chief electoral officer (CEO); since March 2025, Kiran Situt has served as CEO. The CEO is the head of Elections Nunavut, which is headquartered in Rankin Inlet. The CEO appoints a returning officer and assistant returning officer in each Nunavut constituency to oversee the election process in that constituency. A returning officer represents Elections Nunavut in each of the 22 constituencies.

== Services ==
Elections Nunavut's main services are to:

- Administer elections in a fair, transparent, and accountable manner
- Provide public education about the electoral process, in all of Nunavut's official languages
- Maintain an up-to-date electronic voter registration database and voters list
- Develop and distribute information and forms for voters and candidates
- Develop and provide training and manuals for election officers
- Oversee the work of all election officers during elections
- Publish and distribute maps, election returns and reports, candidate financial information, and annual reports
- Maintain a comprehensive website and provide easy access to election information and resources
- Support the work of the Nunavut Electoral Boundaries Commission
- Cooperate with other jurisdictions to improve election services

Elections Nunavut has a commitment to provide user-friendly resources and information in plain language, and offers services in English, French, Inuinnaqtun and Inuktitut (syllabics).

== History ==
Elections Nunavut started its work in 2000 following the first Nunavut general election in 1999. In 2017, municipal elections were passed over to Elections Nunavut from the Nunavut government's Community and Government Services Department.

== Legislative Assembly of Nunavut ==
The Legislative Assembly of Nunavut is a public government and operates on the consensus model. Members of the Legislative Assembly (MLAs) belong to no political party and voting is not based on party politics. Nunavummiut (the people of Nunavut) elect each of their MLAs as an independent representative. The MLAs vote for and form the government from among themselves.

Soon after each general election, the MLAs elect one of their members to be Speaker of the Legislative Assembly and another to be Premier of Nunavut. They also elect from among themselves the members of Cabinet that form the government. The Cabinet are a minority in the Legislature, so the majority of MLAs must agree upon and approve any legislative decision.
