= Monica Ell-Kanayuk =

Canadian politician

President of Inuit Circumpolar Council Canada
- In office 2018–2022
- Preceded by: Nancy Karetak-Lindell
- Succeeded by: Lisa Qiluqqi Koperqualuk

Member of the Legislative Assembly of Nunavut
- In office September 12, 2011 – 2013
- Preceded by: Paul Okalik
- Succeeded by: riding dissolved
- Constituency: Iqaluit West
- In office October 28, 2013 – September 24, 2017
- Preceded by: first member
- Succeeded by: Adam Lightstone
- Constituency: Iqaluit-Manirajak

Personal details
- Born: Monica Ell
- Party: non-partisan consensus government

Monica Inunak Ell-Kanayuk is a Canadian politician and broadcaster who served in the Legislative Assembly of Nunavut from 2011 until 2017 and president of the Inuit Circumpolar Council Canada from 2018 until 2022. Prior to her election as an MLA, she was a director of programming at the Inuit Broadcasting Corporation, president of the Baffin Chamber of Commerce, and owner-and-operator of sewing company Arctic Creations, and Elder advocate.

== Biography ==
Based in the Iqaluit West area since the 1970s, she had a career in broadcasting, including as the Inuit Broadcasting Corporation's director of programming and an eighteen-year tenure at the Canadian Broadcasting Corporation. She served as president of the Baffin Chamber of Commerce and the Nunavut Economic Forum and as director of economic development at Nunavut Tunngavik Incorporated, as well as vice-president of the Nunavut Chamber of Commerce, She also held vice-president roles in Atuqtuarvik Corp and Pauktuutit. Starting in 2024 she has served as an advocate for Nunavut Elders in housing, medical and community life as Executive Director of Pairijiit Tigummiaqtikkut Elders Society. Known to have "had a lifelong passion for clothing design and sewing", she was also owner-and-operator of a sewing company named Arctic Creations, which won the Baffin Chamber of Commerce's Business of the Year award in 1996.

In April 2011, Paul Okalik resigned from the Legislative Assembly of Nunavut in order to run in the 2011 Canadian federal election as the Liberal Party of Canada's candidate for Nunavut, triggering the 2011 Iqaluit West territorial by-election. Ell-Kanayuk subsequently ran as a candidate and used door-to-door campaigning during her run, recalling that she "tried to get into every house but of course there’s dogs and stuff". On September 12, 2011, she won the most votes of any candidate - 230 (or 54%) - and was therefore elected to represent the district.

She was elected to the Iqaluit-Manirajak district in the 2013 Nunavut general election, winning 69% of the votes. During her tenure, she served in the Executive Council of Nunavut in positions such as deputy premier of Nunavut, Minister of Economic Development and Transportation, Minister of Energy, Minister of Family Services, Minister of Health, Minister responsible for Homelessness, Minister responsible for Mines, Minister responsible for the Qulliq Energy Corporation, and Minister responsible for the Status of Women. In the 2017 Nunavut general election, she lost her district to provincial finance officer Adam Lightstone.

In 2018, she was elected president of Inuit Circumpolar Council Canada, beating out Northwest Territories MLA Herbert Nakimayak for the position. She served until 2022, when she was succeeded by Lisa Qiluqqi Koperqualuk.

She has six children with her husband, hunter Eeneasie Kanayuk.
