= Iqaluit-Tasiluk =

Territorial electoral district in Nunavut, Canada

Nunavut electoral district
- Boundaries of Iqaluit-Tasiluk
- Coordinates: 63.753°N 68.470°W

Territorial electoral district
- Legislature: Legislative Assembly of Nunavut
MLA
George Hickes
- First contested: 2013
- Last contested: 2025

Demographics
- Census division: Iqaluit

Iqaluit-Tasiluk (Inuktitut: ᐃᖃᓗᐃᑦ−ᑕᓯᓗᒃ) is a territorial electoral district (riding) for the Legislative Assembly of Nunavut, Canada. The riding consists of part of what was Iqaluit East and Iqaluit Centre. The district was created prior to the 28 October 2013 general election.

== Members of the Legislative Assembly ==
Parliament	Years	Member
4th	2013–2017	George Hickes
5th	2017–2021	George Hickes
6th	2021–2025	George Hickes
7th	2025–present	George Hickes

== Election results ==
=== 2025 election ===
2025 Nunavut general election
Candidate	Votes	%
George Hickes	354	71.7
Malaiya Lucassie	140	28.3
Eligible voters		1,099
Total valid ballots		499
Rejected ballots		5
Turnout		45.86%

=== 2021 election ===
2021 Nunavut general election
Candidate	Votes	%
George Hickes	265	51.0
James T. Arreak	133	25.6
Michael Salomonie	81	15.6
Jonathan Chul-Hee Min Park	41	7.9
Eligible voters		1,064
Total valid ballots		520
Rejected ballots		0
Turnout		48.9%

=== 2017 election ===
2017 Nunavut general election
Candidate	Votes	%
George Hickes	449	78.8
Jacopoosie Peter	121	21.2
Eligible voters		1,164
Total valid ballots		570
Rejected ballots		8
Turnout		49.7%

=== 2013 election ===
2013 Nunavut general election
Candidate	Votes	%
George Hickes	237	38.7
Eva Aariak	194	31.6
Patterk Netser	85	13.9
Travis Cooper	69	11.3
Gideonie Joamie	28	4.6
Eligible voters		850
Total valid ballots		613
Rejected ballots		5
Turnout		72.1%

== See also ==
- List of Nunavut territorial electoral districts
- Canadian provincial electoral districts
