= Iqaluit-Niaqunnguu =

Territorial electoral district in Nunavut, Canada

Nunavut electoral district
- Boundaries of Iqaluit-Niaqunnguu
- Coordinates: 63.340°N 65.878°W

Territorial electoral district
- Legislature: Legislative Assembly of Nunavut
MLA
David Akeeagok
- District created: 2013
- First contested: 2013
- Last contested: 2025

Demographics
- Census subdivision: Iqaluit

Iqaluit-Niaqunnguu (Inuktitut: ᐃᖃᓗᐃᑦ−ᓂᐊᖁᙴ) is a territorial electoral district (riding) for the Legislative Assembly of Nunavut, Canada. The riding consists of part of what was Iqaluit East and Iqaluit Centre. The district was created before the 28 October 2013 general election.

== Members of the Legislative Assembly ==
Parliament	Years	Member
4th	2013–2017	Pat Angnakak
5th	2017–2021	Pat Angnakak
6th	2021–2025	P.J. Akeeagok
7th	2025–present	David Akeeagok

== Election results ==
=== 2025 election ===
2025 Nunavut general election
Candidate	Votes	%
David Akeeagok	270	52.9
Tatanniq Lucie Idlout	124	24.3
Jacopoosie Peter	73	14.3
Walter Picco	43	8.4
Eligible voters		1,181
Total valid ballots		510
Rejected ballots		24
Turnout		45.25%

=== 2021 election ===
2021 Nunavut general election
Candidate	Votes	%
P.J. Akeeagok	404	84.3
Noah Papatsie	54	11.3
Dinos Tikivik	21	4.4
Eligible voters		1,073
Total valid ballots		479
Rejected ballots		5
Turnout		45.1%

=== 2017 election ===
2017 Nunavut general election
Candidate	Votes	%
Pat Angnakak	231	41.2
Franco Buscemi	196	34.9
Anne Crawford	134	23.9
Eligible voters		952
Total valid ballots		561
Rejected ballots		2
Turnout		59.14%

=== 2013 election ===
2013 Nunavut general election
Candidate	Votes	%
Pat Angnakak	151	31.7
Anne Crawford	131	21.5
Methusalah Kunuk	81	17.0
Jack Anawak	66	13.9
Duncan Cunningham	41	8.6
Sytukie Joamie	6	1.3
Eligible voters		742
Total valid ballots		476
Rejected ballots		6
Turnout		65.0%

== See also ==
- List of Nunavut territorial electoral districts
- Canadian provincial electoral districts
