= Iqaluit-Sinaa =

Territorial electoral district in Nunavut, Canada

Nunavut electoral district
- Boundaries of Iqaluit-Sinaa
- Coordinates: 62.591°N 66.824°W

Territorial electoral district
- Legislature: Legislative Assembly of Nunavut
MLA
Janet Brewster
- District created: 2013
- First contested: 2013
- Last contested: 2025

Demographics
- Census subdivision: Iqaluit

Iqaluit-Sinaa (Inuktitut: ᐃᖃᓗᐃᑦ−ᓯᓈ) is a territorial electoral district(riding) for the Legislative Assembly of Nunavut, Canada. The riding consists of part of what was Iqaluit West and Iqaluit Centre. The district was created prior to the 28 October 2013 general election.

== Members of the Legislative Assembly ==
Parliament	Years	Member
4th	2013–2017	Paul Okalik
5th	2017–2021	Elisapee Sheutiapik
6th	2021–2025	Janet Pitsiulaaq Brewster
7th	2025–present	Janet Pitsiulaaq Brewster

== Election results ==
=== 2025 election ===
2025 Nunavut general election
Candidate	Votes	%
Janet Pitsiulaaq Brewster	175	53.8
Robin Anawak	150	46.2
Eligible voters		1,000
Total valid ballots		325
Rejected ballots		0
Turnout		32.5%

=== 2021 election ===
2021 Nunavut general election
Candidate	Votes	%
Janet Pitsiulaaq Brewster	97	37.0
Jeff Ungalaq Maurice	90	34.4
Christa Kunuk	75	28.6
Eligible voters		895
Total valid ballots		262
Rejected ballots		2
Turnout		29.3%

=== 2017 election ===
2017 Nunavut general election
Candidate	Votes	%
Elisapee Sheutiapik	237	44.8
Paul Okalik	150	28.4
Cindy Rennie	86	16.3
Adamee Itorcheak	56	10.6
Eligible voters		1,081
Total valid ballots		529
Rejected ballots		9
Turnout		48.91%

=== 2013 election ===
2013 Nunavut general election
Candidate	Votes	%
Paul Okalik	180	46.4
Leesee Papatsie	97	25.0
Solomon Awa	69	17.8
Natsiq Kango	42	10.8
Eligible voters		771
Total valid ballots		388
Rejected ballots		0
Turnout		50.3%

== See also ==
- List of Nunavut territorial electoral districts
- Canadian provincial electoral districts
