= Iqaluit-Manirajak =

Territorial electoral district in Nunavut, Canada

Nunavut electoral district
- Boundaries of Iqaluit-Manirajak
- Coordinates: 63.753°N 68.537°W

Territorial electoral district
- Legislature: Legislative Assembly of Nunavut
MLA
Gwen Healey Akearok
- District created: 2013
- First contested: 2013
- Last contested: 2025

Demographics
- Census subdivision: Iqaluit

Iqaluit-Manirajak (Inuktitut: ᐃᖃᓗᐃᑦ−ᒪᓂᕋᔭᒃ) is a territorial electoral district (riding) for the Legislative Assembly of Nunavut, Canada. The riding consists of part of what was Iqaluit West and Iqaluit Centre. The district was created prior to the 28 October 2013 general election.

== Members of the Legislative Assembly ==
Parliament	Years	Member
4th	2013–2017	Monica Ell-Kanayuk
5th	2017–2021	Adam Lightstone
6th	2021–2025	Adam Lightstone
7th	2025–present	Gwen Healey Akearok

== Election results ==
=== 2025 election ===
2025 Nunavut general election
Candidate	Votes	%
Gwen Healey Akearok	245	63.3
Adam Lightstone	142	36.7
Eligible voters		1,097
Total valid ballots		399
Rejected ballots		12
Turnout		37.46%

=== 2021 election ===
2021 Nunavut general election
Candidate	Votes	%
Adam Lightstone	306	65.4
Joanasie Akumalik	162	34.6
Eligible voters		1,025
Total valid ballots		446
Rejected ballots		2
Turnout		43.7%

=== 2017 election ===
2017 Nunavut general election
Candidate	Votes	%
Adam Lightstone	253	40.5
Monica Ell-Kanayuk	227	36.3
Jude Lewis	81	13.0
Okalik Eegeesiak	64	10.2
Eligible voters		1,070
Total valid ballots		625
Rejected ballots		2
Turnout		58.6%

=== 2013 election ===
2013 Nunavut general election
Candidate	Votes	%
Monica Ell-Kanayuk	330	69.0
Mikidjuk Akavak	72	15.1
Lewis Lehman	57	11.9
Paulie Sammurtok	19	4.0
Eligible voters		709
Total valid ballots		478
Rejected ballots		0
Turnout		67.4%

== See also ==
- List of Nunavut territorial electoral districts
- Canadian provincial electoral districts
