= Rankin Inlet North =

Former territorial electoral district in Nunavut, Canada

Rankin Inlet North was a territorial electoral district (riding) for the Legislative Assembly of Nunavut, Canada. The area is now a part of the Rankin Inlet North-Chesterfield Inlet riding.

== Election results ==
=== 1999 election ===
1999 Nunavut general election
Name	Vote	%
Jack Anawak	146	36.78%
Louis Pilakapsi	132	33.25%
Lorne Quassa Kusugak	119	29.97%
Total Valid Ballots	397	100%
Voter Turnout %	Rejected Ballots	

=== 2004 election ===
2004 Nunavut general election
Name	Vote	%
Tagak Curley	Acclaimed	

=== 2008 election ===
2008 Nunavut general election
Name	Vote	%
Tagak Curley	Acclaimed	

== See also ==
- List of Nunavut territorial electoral districts
- Canadian provincial electoral districts
