= Gjoa Haven (electoral district) =

Territorial electoral district in Nunavut, Canada

Nunavut electoral district
- Boundaries of Gjoa Haven
- Coordinates: 68°37′33″N 095°52′30″W

Territorial electoral district
- Legislature: Legislative Assembly of Nunavut
MLA
David Porter
- District created: 2013
- First contested: 2013
- Last contested: 2025

Gjoa Haven (Inuktitut: ᐅᕐᒃᓱᕐᒃᑑᕐᒃ, Inuinnaqtun: Uqhuqtuuq) is a territorial electoral district (riding) for the Legislative Assembly of Nunavut, Canada. The riding consists of the community of Gjoa Haven. The district was created prior to the 28 October 2013 general election. The community used to be in Nattilik.

== Members of the Legislative Assembly ==
Parliament	Years	Member
4th	2013–2017	Tony Akoak
5th	2017–2021	Tony Akoak
6th	2021–2025	Tony Akoak
7th	2025–present	David Porter

== Election results ==
=== 2025 election ===
2025 Nunavut general election
Candidate	Votes	%
David Porter	132	36.0
Meghan Porter	124	33.8
Agoakteak Gregory Nahaglulik	51	13.9
David Akoak	49	13.4
Sonny Porter	11	3.0
Eligible voters		701
Total valid ballots		369
Rejected ballots		2
Turnout		52.94%

=== 2021 election ===
2021 Nunavut general election
Candidate	Votes	%
Tony Akoak	143	39.8
Allen Aglukkaq	89	24.8
Paul Puqiqnak	77	21.5
Veronica Ullulaq	36	10.0
Gregory Nahaglulik	14	3.9
Eligible voters		726
Total valid ballots		359
Rejected ballots		3
Turnout		49.5%

=== 2017 election ===
2017 Nunavut general election
Candidate	Votes	%
Tony Akoak	171	39.2
James Taqaugaq Qitsualik	133	30.5
Paul Puqiqnak	79	18.1
Joseph Aglukkaq	53	12.2
Eligible voters		688
Total valid ballots		436
Rejected ballots		2
Turnout		63.4%

=== 2013 election ===
2013 Nunavut general election
Candidate	Votes	%
Tony Akoak	210	48.4
Linda Hunter	161	37.1
George Sonny Porter	46	10.6
Andrew Porter	17	3.9
Eligible voters		618
Total valid ballots		434
Rejected ballots		7
Turnout		70.2%

== See also ==
- List of Nunavut territorial electoral districts
- Canadian provincial electoral districts
