= Pangnirtung (electoral district) =

Territorial electoral district in Nunavut, Canada

Nunavut electoral district
- Boundaries of Pangnirtung
- Coordinates: 66°08′52″N 065°41′58″W

Territorial electoral district
- Legislature: Legislative Assembly of Nunavut
MLA
Johnny Mike
- District created: 1999
- First contested: 1999
- Last contested: 2025

Pangnirtung (Inuktitut: ᐸᖕᓂᕐᒃᑑᕐᒃ, Inuinnaqtun: Pangniqtuuq) is a territorial electoral district (riding) for the Legislative Assembly of Nunavut, Canada.

The riding consists of the community of Pangnirtung.

== Members of the Legislative Assembly ==
† by-election

Parliament	Years	Member
1st	1999–2004	Peter Kilabuk
2nd	2004–2008	Peter Kilabuk
3rd	2008–2011	Adamee Komoartok
3rd†	2011–2013	Hezakiah Oshutapik
4th	2013–2017	Johnny Mike
5th	2017–2021	Margaret Nakashuk
6th	2021–2025	Margaret Nakashuk
7th	2025–present	Johnny Mike

== Election results ==
=== 2025 election ===
2025 Nunavut general election
Candidate	Votes	%
Johnny Mike	127	36.7
Nathaniel Julai Alikatuktuk	123	35.5
Andrew Nakashuk	92	26.6
Eligible voters		744
Total valid ballots		346
Rejected ballots		4
Turnout		46.51%

=== 2021 election ===
2021 Nunavut general election
Candidate	Votes
Margaret Nakashuk	Acclaimed

=== 2017 election ===
2017 Nunavut general election
Candidate	Votes	%
Margaret Nakashuk	266	51.25
Harry John Dialla	129	24.86
Johnny Mike	93	17.92
Hezakiah Oshutapik	31	5.97
Eligible voters		676
Total valid ballots		519
Rejected ballots		1
Turnout		76.81%

=== 2013 election ===
2013 Nunavut general election
Candidate	Votes	%
Johnny Mike	198	37.4
Harry J Dialla	183	34.5
Sakiasie Sowdlooapik	82	15.5
Hezakiah Oshutapik	67	12.6
Eligible voters		663
Total valid ballots		530
Rejected ballots		3
Turnout		80.0%

=== 2011 by-election ===
2011 Nunavut general election
Candidate	Votes	%
Hezakiah Oshutapik	218	55.05
Johnny Mike	178	44.95
Eligible voters		710
Total valid ballots		396
Rejected ballots		6
Turnout		55.76%

=== 2008 election ===
2008 Nunavut general election
Candidate	Votes	%
Adamee Komoartok	245	62.5
Looee Arreak	147	37.5
Eligible voters		616
Total valid ballots		392
Rejected ballots		3
Turnout		63.61%

=== 2004 election ===
2004 Nunavut general election
Candidate	Votes	%
Peter Kilabuk	305	61.87
Simeonie Keenainak	188	38.13
Eligible voters		587
Total valid ballots		493
Rejected ballots		4
Turnout		83.95%

=== 1999 election ===
1999 Nunavut general election
Candidate	Votes	%
Peter Kilabuk	171	30.76
Simeonie Keenainak	119	21.40
Meeka M. Kilabuk	83	14.93
Sakiasie Sowdlooapik	80	14.39
Thomasie Alikatuktuk	53	9.53
Jaypetee Qappik	50	8.99
Eligible voters		686
Total valid ballots		556
Rejected ballots		2
Turnout		80.99%

== See also ==
- List of Nunavut territorial electoral districts
- Canadian provincial electoral districts
