= Aggu =

Territorial electoral district in Nunavut, Canada

Coordinates: 69.391°N 81.710°W

Nunavut electoral district
- Boundaries of Aggu

Territorial electoral district
- Legislature: Legislative Assembly of Nunavut
MLA
Edward Attagutaluk
- District created: 2013
- First contested: 2013
- Last contested: 2025

Aggu (Inuktitut: ᐊᒡᒍ) is a territorial electoral district (riding) for the Legislative Assembly of Nunavut, Canada. The riding consists of part of the community of Igloolik. The district was created prior to the 28 October 2013 general election. The community had been in Amittuq.

== Members of the Legislative Assembly ==
† by-election

Parliament	Years	Member
4th	2013–2017	Paul Quassa
5th	2017–2021	Paul Quassa
6th	2021–2025	Joanna Quassa
7th†	2025–present	Edward Attagutaluk

== Election results ==
=== 2025 by-election ===
2025 Nunavut general election
Candidate	Votes	%
Edward Attagutaluk	86	45.26
Joanna Quassa	26	13.68
George Qaunaq	25	13.16
Erasmus Ivvalu	24	12.63
Louis Tapardjuk	20	10.53
Louisa Iyerak	8	4.21
Eligible voters		572
Total valid ballots		189
Rejected ballots		1
Turnout		33.22%

=== 2025 election ===
2025 Nunavut general election
Candidate	Votes	%
Joanna Quassa	105	50.00
Erasmus Ivvalu	105	50.00
Eligible voters		533
Total valid ballots		209
Rejected ballots		8
Turnout		40.75%

=== 2021 election ===
2021 Nunavut general election
Candidate	Votes	%
Joanna Quassa	96	52.8
Methusalah Kunuk	86	47.3
Eligible voters		522
Total valid ballots		182
Rejected ballots		0
Turnout		34.9%

=== 2017 election ===
2017 Nunavut general election
Candidate	Votes	%
Paul Quassa	106	35.9
Matt Teed	96	32.5
Richard Amarualik	79	26.8
Jerome Sheaves	14	4.7
Eligible voters		472
Total valid ballots		295
Rejected ballots		8
Turnout		62.5%

=== 2013 election ===
2013 Nunavut general election
Candidate	Votes	%
Paul Quassa	96	43.4
John Illupalik	83	37.6
Daniel Uyarak	42	19.0
Eligible voters		447
Total valid ballots		221
Rejected ballots		5
Turnout		49.4%

== See also ==
- List of Nunavut territorial electoral districts
- Canadian provincial electoral districts
