= Pat Angnakak =

Canadian politician

The Honourable Pat Angnakak MLA

Member of the Legislative Assembly of Nunavut for Iqaluit-Niaqunnguu
- In office October 28, 2013 – August 18, 2021
- Preceded by: Riding Established
- Succeeded by: P. J. Akeeagok

Personal details
- Born: Patricia Gardener; 1962 or 1963 (age 62–63)
- Party: non-partisan consensus government (territorial); Liberal Party of Canada (federal)
- Parent(s): Michael and Margaret Gardener
- Education: Nunavut Arctic College

Patricia Angnakak is a Canadian politician, who was elected to the Legislative Assembly of Nunavut in the 2013 election and reelected in 2017. She represented the electoral district of Iqaluit-Niaqunnguu until 2021; she resigned her seat in the legislature in August 2021 in order to run as a Liberal Party of Canada candidate in the 2021 Canadian federal election, but was defeated by Lori Idlout of the New Democratic Party.

Angnakak at one point served as the territory's Minister of Healthcare and has advocated for increased government accountability and services for employees experiencing workplace harassment, as well as in healthcare issues such as poverty, lack of social issues services, and emergency medicine infrastructure.

Originally from in Cape Dorset and Pangnirtung, Angnakak speaks both English and Inuktitut and has served on several boards and associations related to community development.

== Politics and views ==
After being elected to the 4th Legislative Assembly in 2013, Angnakak chaired the Standing Committee on Public Accounts, Independent Officers and Other Entities and also served on the Management and Services Board.

On October 30, 2017, Angnakak was reelected to represent Iqaluit-Niaqunnguu for Nunavut's 5th Legislative Assembly. On November 17, she was elected to serve on the Executive Council and was sworn in as Minister on November 21.

=== Advocacy for government employees ===
Angnakak was described as the "voice for bullied government employees in Iqaluit" by Aboriginal Peoples Television Network (APTN). An employee – who was suicidal due to conflicts with their supervisor leading to fears of job loss – talked to Angnakak after talking to superiors and ethics officers had failed, and Angnakak (as well as some of her colleagues) began talking to the Assembly's ministers and questioning the territory's Human Resources Minister Keith Peterson during House sessions, citing nepotism, favoritism, and the dissolution of the government's HR department. Angnakak described many of the government's workplace conflicts as stemming from cultural conflicts between Inuit employees and their non-Inuit managers, employee fears of loss of government-employment-provided housing to offset expensive rent, and disproportionate rates of temporary vs. permanent jobs among the local, Inuit employees vs. non-Inuit employees hired from southern Canada.

Angnakak suggested establishing a public service commission, following the Yukon's model, which would include a workplace wellness office and a committee made up of representatives that would hear disagreements between employees and their supervisors.

=== Healthcare ===
In 2018, Angnakak, serving as Healthcare Minister, described a systemic problem with addiction, domestic violence, and mental healthcare due to a lack of resources and infrastructure, such as mental health professionals and shelters for women fleeing violence. She, Minister of Family Services Elisapee Sheutiapik, Northwest Territories Minister of Health and Social Services Glen Abernethy, and Yukon Minister of Health and Social Services Pauline Frost later met to collaborate on methods to improve health across northern Canada. The Ministers discussed working across territories and issues such as "Indigenous children and youth in care, recruitment and retention of health and social services professionals, fetal alcohol spectrum disorder," and the effects of poverty and distance on food insecurity, including programs such as Nutrition North Canada.

In June 2019, Angnakak called for changes in government handling and accountability of its contractors of medical evacuation airlines and equipment, citing ongoing issues with equipment failures leading to service delays and further medical complications.

== Personal life ==
Angnakak grew up in Cape Dorset and Pangnirtung, later moving to Iqaluit. She graduated from Nunavut Arctic College and speaks both English and Inuktitut. She is married, with three adult children and four grandchildren. She is the daughter of Michael Gardener, an Anglican priest in Iqaluit who was inducted into the Order of Canada in 2007 and the Order of Nunavut in 2011.

Outside of politics, she has been the CEO of the Kakivak Association and the Director of Corporate Priorities for Nunavut's Department of Executive and Intergovernmental Affairs, as well as volunteering with the Toonik Tyme Committee, the Anglican Church of Canada, and the Sailivik Society. She has also been a member of the Nunavut Surface Rights Tribunal and the Iqaluit District Education Authority.

== Electoral record ==
=== Federal ===
2021 Canadian federal election: Nunavut
| Party | Candidate | Votes | % | ±% | Expenditures |
|---|---|---|---|---|---|
| New Democratic | Lori Idlout | 3,277 | 46.55 | +5.71 | $64,249.91 |
| Liberal | Pat Angnakak | 2,578 | 36.62 | +5.75 | $46,353.02 |
| Conservative | Laura Mackenzie | 1,184 | 16.82 | –9.30 | $3,673.40 |
| Total valid votes/expense limit | | 7,039 | 98.90 | – | $108,435.17 |
| Total rejected ballots | | 78 | 1.10 | +0.18 | |
| Turnout | | 7,117 | 33.10 | –14.55 | |
| Eligible voters | | 21,499 | | | |
| New Democratic hold | | Swing | | +5.73 | |
Source: Elections Canada

=== Territorial ===
2017 Nunavut general election
| Name | Vote | % |
| Pat Angnakak | 231 | |
| Franco Buscemi | 196 | |
| Anne Crawford | 134 | |

2013 Nunavut general election
| Name | Vote | % |
| Pat Angnakak | 151 | 31.7% |
| Anne Crawford | 131 | 21.5% |
| Methusalah Kunuk | 81 | 17.0% |
| Jack Anawak | 66 | 13.9% |
| Duncan Cunningham | 41 | 8.6% |
| Sytukie Joamie | 6 | 1.3% |
| Total Valid Ballots | 476 | 100% |
| Voter Turnout 65.0% | Rejected Ballots 6 | |
