= Cambridge Bay (electoral district) =

Territorial electoral district in Nunavut, Canada

Nunavut electoral district
- Boundaries of Cambridge Bay
- Coordinates: 69°07′02″N 105°03′11″W

Territorial electoral district
- Legislature: Legislative Assembly of Nunavut
MLA
Fred Pedersen
- District created: 15 February 1999
- First contested: 1999
- Last contested: 2025

Demographics
- Population (2006): 1,477
- Census division: Kitikmeot Region
- Census subdivision(s): Bathurst Inlet, Cambridge Bay, Umingmaktok

Cambridge Bay (Inuinnaqtun: Iqaluktuuttiaq, Inuktitut: ᐃᖃᓗᒃᑑᑎᐊᕐᒃ) is a territorial electoral district (riding) for the Legislative Assembly of Nunavut, Canada. The riding, which consists of the communities of Bathurst Inlet, Cambridge Bay and Umingmaktok, came into existence for the first Nunavut general election. The election, which occurred 15 February 1999, was held prior to division of the Northwest Territories and Nunavut, 1 April 1999.

== Members of the Legislative Assembly ==
Parliament	Years	Member
1st	1999–2004	Kelvin Ng
2nd	2004–2008	Keith Peterson
3rd	2008–2013	Keith Peterson
4th	2013–2017	Keith Peterson
5th	2017–2021	Jeannie Ehaloak
6th	2021–2025	Pam Gross
7th	2025–present	Fred Pedersen

== Election results ==
=== 2025 election ===
2025 Nunavut general election
Candidate	Votes	%
Fred Pedersen	330	55.0
Pam Gross	176	29.3
Peter Ohokak	94	15.7
Eligible voters		1,055
Total valid ballots		605
Rejected ballots		5
Turnout		57.84%

=== 2021 election ===
2021 Nunavut general election
Candidate	Votes	%
Pam Gross	224	34.6
Jeannie Ehaloak	215	33.2
Peter Ohokak	209	32.3
Eligible voters		1,016
Total valid ballots		648
Rejected ballots		1
Turnout		63.9%

=== 2017 election ===
2017 Nunavut general election
Candidate	Votes	%
Jeannie Ehaloak	259	40.7
Pam Gross	250	39.3
Harry Maksagak	126	19.8
Eligible voters		
Total valid ballots		635
Rejected ballots		

=== 2013 election ===
2013 Nunavut general election
Candidate	Votes	%
Keith Peterson	443	68.7
Fred Pedersen	120	18.6
Clara Hokayak Evalik	82	12.7
Eligible voters		
Total valid ballots		645
Rejected ballots		10
Turnout		101.7%

=== 2008 election ===
2008 Nunavut general election
Candidate	Votes
Keith Peterson	Acclaimed

=== 2004 election ===
2004 Nunavut general election
Candidate	Votes	%
Keith Peterson	311	54.09
Harry Ambrose Aknavigak	93	16.17
Harry Maksagak	86	14.96
David Kaosoni	85	14.78
Eligible voters		
Total valid ballots		575
Rejected ballots		0
Turnout		102.13%

=== 1999 election ===
1999 Nunavut general election
Candidate	Votes	%
Kelvin Ng	332	49.41
Wilfred Wilcox	164	24.41
Mike O'Gorman	108	16.07
Beatrice Bernhardt	68	10.11
Eligible voters		
Total valid ballots		672

== See also ==
- List of Nunavut territorial electoral districts
- Canadian provincial electoral districts
