= Cathy Towtongie =

Canadian Inuk politician

Member of the Legislative Assembly of Nunavut
- In office October 30, 2017 – September 20, 2021
- Preceded by: Tom Sammurtok
- Succeeded by: Alexander Sammurtok
- Constituency: Rankin Inlet North-Chesterfield Inlet

Q. Cathy Towtongie is a Canadian Inuk politician from Rankin Inlet, Nunavut. She was elected to the Legislative Assembly of Nunavut in the 2017 general election to represent the electoral district of Rankin Inlet North-Chesterfield Inlet.

Prior to her election to the legislature, Towtongie served two terms as president of Nunavut Tunngavik from 2001 to 2004 and from 2010 to 2016. In this role, she faced criticism when she publicly objected to Iqaluit City Council's decision to raise a rainbow flag during the 2014 Winter Olympics in protest against the Russian gay propaganda law.

In 2020 she faced further criticism when she objected to the use of the word two-spirit in a motion on missing and murdered Indigenous women by fellow MLA Elisapee Sheutiapik, arguing that the concept was not a part of Inuit culture. The criticism included an open letter from actress Anna Lambe, calling on the legislature to censure Towtongie for her comments. In 2021, just a few days before the commencement of the 2021 Nunavut general election campaign, Towtongie criticized the clothing manufacturer Canada Goose for its decision to stop using natural fur in its products.

Towtongie was defeated in the 2021 election by Alexander Sammurtok.
