= Arviat North-Whale Cove =

Territorial electoral district in Nunavut, Canada

Nunavut electoral district
- Boundaries of Arviat North-Whale Cove
- Coordinates: 62.230°N 95.050°W

Territorial electoral district
- Legislature: Legislative Assembly of Nunavut
MLA
John Main
- District created: 2013
- First contested: 2013
- Last contested: 2025

Arviat North-Whale Cove (Inuktitut: ᐊᕐᕕᐊᑦ ᐅᐊᖕᓇᖓ−ᑎᑭᕋᕐᔪᐊᖅ, French: Arviat Nord-Whale Cove, Inuinnaqtun: Arviat Tununga-Tikiraryuaq) is a territorial electoral district (riding) for the Legislative Assembly of Nunavut, Canada. The riding consists of part of the community of Arviat and Whale Cove. The district was created prior to the 28 October 2013 general election. The communities were previously in Arviat and Rankin Inlet South/Whale Cove.

== Members of the Legislative Assembly ==
Parliament	Years	Member
4th	2013–2017	George Kuksuk
5th	2017–2021	John Main
6th	2021–2025	John Main
7th	2025–present	John Main

== Election results ==
=== 2025 election ===
2025 Nunavut general election
Candidate	Votes	%
John Main	229	57.0
Tony Uluadluak	173	43.0
Eligible voters		817
Total valid ballots		402
Rejected ballots		3
Turnout		49.57%

=== 2021 election ===
2021 Nunavut general election
Candidate	Votes	%
John Main	Acclaimed	
Eligible voters		
Total valid ballots		
Rejected ballots		
Turnout		

=== 2017 election ===
2017 Nunavut general election
Candidate	Votes	%
John Main	408	78.0
George Kuksuk	115	22.0
Eligible voters		670
Total valid ballots		523
Rejected ballots		0
Turnout		78.06%

=== 2013 election ===
2013 Nunavut general election
Candidate	Votes	%
George Kuksuk	160	34.6
Elizabeth Copland	146	31.6
David Kritterdlik	71	15.4
Amauyak Netser	66	14.3
Joseph Ivitaaruq Kaviok	19	4.1
Eligible voters		616
Total valid ballots		462
Rejected ballots		6
Turnout		75%

== See also ==
- List of Nunavut territorial electoral districts
- Canadian provincial electoral districts
