= Arviat South =

Territorial electoral district in Nunavut, Canada

Nunavut electoral district
- Boundaries of Arviat South
- Coordinates: 61°05′16″N 96°06′50″W

Territorial electoral district
- Legislature: Legislative Assembly of Nunavut
MLA
Jamie Kablutsiak
- District created: 2013
- First contested: 2013
- Last contested: 2025

Arviat South (Inuktitut: ᐊᕐᕕᐊᑦ ᓂᒋᐊ, French: Arviat Sud, Inuinnaqtun: Arviat Hivuraa) is an electoral district (riding) for the Legislative Assembly of Nunavut, Canada. The riding consists of part of the community of Arviat. The district was created prior to the 28 October 2013 general election. The community was previously in Arviat.

Arviat South MLA Joe Savikataaq, who was Deputy Premier of Nunavut following the October 30, 2017 election, became Premier after Paul Quassa was removed from his position after a vote of no-confidence.

== Members of the Legislative Assembly ==
Parliament	Years	Member
4th	2013–2017	Joe Savikataaq
5th	2017–2021	Joe Savikataaq
6th	2021–2025	Joe Savikataaq
7th	2025–present	Jamie Kablutsiak

== Election results ==
=== 2025 election ===
2025 Nunavut general election
Candidate	Votes	%
Jamie Kablutsiak	256	68.1
Alana Kuksuk	120	31.9
Eligible voters		712
Total valid ballots		376
Rejected ballots		1
Turnout		52.96%

=== 2021 election ===
2021 Nunavut general election
Candidate	Votes	%
Joe Savikataaq	Acclaimed	

=== 2017 election ===
2017 Nunavut general election
Candidate	Votes	%
Joe Savikataaq	280	54.5
Jason Gibbons	234	45.5
Eligible voters		633
Total valid ballots		514
Rejected ballots		14
Turnout		81.23%

=== 2013 election ===
2013 Nunavut general election
Candidate	Votes	%
Joe Savikataaq	181	40.0
Airo Pameolik	147	32.5
Peter Alareak	125	27.6
Eligible voters		592
Total valid ballots		453
Rejected ballots		1
Turnout		76.6%

== See also ==
- List of Nunavut territorial electoral districts
- Canadian provincial electoral districts
