= Rankin Inlet North-Chesterfield Inlet =

Territorial electoral district in Nunavut, Canada

Nunavut electoral district
- Boundaries of Rankin Inlet North-Chesterfield Inlet

Territorial electoral district
- Legislature: Legislative Assembly of Nunavut
MLA
Alexander Sammurtok
- District created: 2013
- First contested: 2013
- Last contested: 2025

Rankin Inlet North-Chesterfield Inlet (Inuktitut: ᑲᖏᕐᒃᖠᓂᐅᑉ ᐅᐊᖕᓇᖓ−ᐃᒡᓗᓕᒑᕐᔪᒃ, French: Rankin Inlet Nord-Chesterfield Inlet, Inuinnaqtun: Kangirliniq Tununga-Igluligaaryuk) is a territorial electoral district (riding) for the Legislative Assembly of Nunavut, Canada. The riding consists of the communities of Chesterfield Inlet and part of Rankin Inlet. The district was created prior to the 28 October 2013 general election. The communities were previously in Nanulik and Rankin Inlet North.

== Members of the Legislative Assembly ==
Parliament	Years	Member
4th	2013–2017	Tom Sammurtok
5th	2017–2021	Cathy Towtongie
6th	2021–2025	Alexander Sammurtok
7th	2025–present	Alexander Sammurtok

== Election results ==
=== 2025 election ===
2025 Nunavut general election
Candidate	Votes	%
Alexander Sammurtok	156	52.2
Cathy Towtongie	143	47.8
Eligible voters		801
Total valid ballots		304
Rejected ballots		5
Turnout		38.58%

=== 2021 election ===
2021 Nunavut general election
Candidate	Votes	%
Alexander Sammurtok	147	46.8
Q. Cathy Towtongie	124	39.5
Albert Aokaut	43	13.7
Eligible voters		816
Total valid ballots		314
Rejected ballots		2
Turnout		38.5%

=== 2017 election ===
2017 Nunavut general election
Candidate	Votes	%
Cathy Towtongie	170	37.0
Cedric Autut	144	31.4
Tom Sammurtok	89	19.4
Douglas Aggark	56	12.2
Eligible voters		813
Total valid ballots		459
Rejected ballots		5
Turnout		56.45%

=== 2013 election ===
2013 Nunavut general election
Candidate	Votes	%
Tom Sammurtok	212	45.8
Donna Adams	94	20.3
Qilak Kusugak	89	19.2
Harry Niakrok	68	14.7
Eligible voters		723
Total valid ballots		463
Rejected ballots		3
Turnout		64.0%

== See also ==
- List of Nunavut territorial electoral districts
- Canadian provincial electoral districts
