= Johnny Mike =

Canadian politician

Johnny Mike MLA

Member of the Legislative Assembly of Nunavut for Pangnirtung
- Incumbent
- Assumed office October 27, 2025
- Preceded by: Margaret Nakashuk
- In office October 28, 2013 – September 24, 2017
- Preceded by: Hezakiah Oshutapik
- Succeeded by: Margaret Nakashuk

Personal details
- Born: 1954 or 1955 (age 70–71)
- Party: non-partisan consensus government

Johnny Mike is a Canadian politician, who was elected to the Legislative Assembly of Nunavut in the 2013 election. He represented the electoral district of Pangnirtung. and served as Minister of the Environment in the Executive Council of Nunavut, until his defeat in the 2017 election. He returned to the Assembly by winning in the 2025 election.
