= Tom Sammurtok =

Canadian politician

Tom Sammurtok MLA

Member of the Legislative Assembly of Nunavut for Rankin Inlet North-Chesterfield Inlet
- In office October 28, 2013 – September 24, 2017
- Preceded by: Riding Established
- Succeeded by: Cathy Towtongie

Personal details
- Born: 1946 or 1947 (age 78–79)
- Party: non-partisan consensus government

Tom Sammurtok is a Canadian politician, who was elected to the Legislative Assembly of Nunavut in the 2013 election. He represented the electoral district of Rankin Inlet North-Chesterfield Inlet until 2017, when he was defeated by Cathy Towtongie.

He is the uncle of Alexander Sammurtok, who was elected as the MLA for the neighbouring electoral district of Rankin Inlet South in a 2014 byelection.
