= Rankin Inlet South =

Territorial electoral district in Nunavut, Canada

Nunavut electoral district
- Boundaries of Rankin Inlet South

Territorial electoral district
- Legislature: Legislative Assembly of Nunavut
MLA
Annie Tattuinee
- District created: 2013
- First contested: 2013
- Last contested: 2025

Rankin Inlet South (Inuktitut: ᑲᖏᕐᒃᖠᓂᐅᑉ ᓂᒋᐊ, French: Rankin Inlet Sud, Inuinnaqtun: Kangirliniq Hivuraa) is a territorial electoral district (riding) for the Legislative Assembly of Nunavut, Canada. The riding consists of part of Rankin Inlet. The district was created prior to the 28 October 2013 general election. The community used to be in Rankin Inlet South/Whale Cove.

The election resulted in a tie and a recount was held November 5. This confirmed the tie, forcing a by-election on February 10, 2014, which was won by Alexander Sammurtok.

== Members of the Legislative Assembly ==
† by-election

Parliament	Years	Member
4th	2013–2014	Lorne Kusugak
4th†	2014–2017	Alexander Sammurtok
5th	2017–2021	Lorne Kusugak
6th	2021–2025	Lorne Kusugak
7th	2025–present	Annie Tattuinee

== Election results ==
=== 2025 election ===
2025 Nunavut general election
Candidate	Votes	%
Annie Tattuinee	193	58.8
Gerry Anawak	70	22.5
Tagak Curley	58	18.6
Eligible voters		724
Total valid ballots		312
Rejected ballots		1
Turnout		43.09%

=== 2021 election ===
2021 Nunavut general election
Candidate	Votes	%
Lorne Kusugak	198	52.4
Tagak Curley	98	25.9
Bobby Oolooyuk	82	21.7
Eligible voters		727
Total valid ballots		378
Rejected ballots		1
Turnout		52.0%

=== 2017 election ===
2017 Nunavut general election
Candidate	Votes	%
Lorne Kusugak	309	69.4
Alexander Sammurtok	136	30.6
Eligible voters		733
Total valid ballots		445
Rejected ballots		2
Turnout		60.73%

=== 2014 by-election ===
2014 Nunavut general election
Candidate	Votes	%
Alexander Sammurtok	268	54.3
Lorne Kusugak	225	45.7
Eligible voters		613
Total valid ballots		493
Rejected ballots		2
Turnout		80.4%

=== 2013 election ===
2013 Nunavut general election
Candidate	Votes	%
Lorne Kusugak	172	50.0
Alexander Sammurtok	172	50.0
Eligible voters		604
Total valid ballots		344
Rejected ballots		6
Turnout		56.9%

== See also ==
- List of Nunavut territorial electoral districts
- Canadian provincial electoral districts
