= George Kuksuk =

Canadian politician

Member of the Legislative Assembly of Nunavut for Arviat North-Whale Cove
- In office October 28, 2013 – September 24, 2017
- Preceded by: riding established
- Succeeded by: John Main

Personal details
- Born: c. 1954 (age 71–72)
- Party: non-partisan consensus government

George Kuksuk is a Canadian politician, who was elected to the Legislative Assembly of Nunavut in the 2013 election. He represented the electoral district of Arviat North-Whale Cove.
