= Steven Taqtu =

Canadian politician

Steven Taqtu MLA

Member of the Legislative Assembly of Nunavut for Quttiktuq
- Incumbent
- Assumed office October 27, 2025
- Preceded by: David Akeeagok

Personal details
- Party: Non-partisan consensus government

Steven Taqtu is a Canadian politician, who was elected to the Legislative Assembly of Nunavut in the 2025 Nunavut general election. He represents the electoral district of Quttiktuq.

Taqtu has been a lifelong resident of Arctic Bay and is a heavy equipment operator.
