= Annie Tattuinee =

Canadian politician

The Honourable Annie Tattuinee MLA

Member of the Legislative Assembly of Nunavut for Rankin Inlet South
- Incumbent
- Assumed office October 27, 2025
- Preceded by: Lorne Kusugak

Member of the Executive Council of Nunavut
- Incumbent
- Assumed office November 20, 2025

Personal details
- Party: Non-partisan consensus government

Annie Tattuinee is a Canadian politician, who was elected to the Legislative Assembly of Nunavut in the 2025 Nunavut general election. She represents the electoral district of Rankin Inlet South.

Tattuinee is a mother of 3, grandmother of 7, and great-grandmother of one. She was once the CEO of Nunavut Tunngavik Incorporated.
