= Rankin Inlet South/Whale Cove =

Former territorial electoral district in Nunavut, Canada

Rankin Inlet South/Whale Cove was a territorial electoral district (riding) for the Legislative Assembly of Nunavut, Canada. The riding consisted of the communities of Rankin Inlet and Whale Cove.

In 2013, the riding was redistributed into Rankin Inlet South and Arviat North-Whale Cove.

== Election results ==
=== 1999 election ===
1999 Nunavut general election
Name	Vote	%
Manitok Thompson	191	37.16%
Levinia Brown	178	34.63%
Harry Towtongie	145	28.21%
Total Valid Ballots	514	100%
Voter Turnout %	Rejected Ballots	

=== 2004 election ===
2004 Nunavut general election
Name	Vote	%
Levinia Brown	206	38.87%
Jerry Ell	173	32.64%
Percy Kabloona	84	15.85%
Ishmael Naulalik	50	9.43%
Solomon Voisey	17	3.21%
Total Valid Ballots	530	100%
Voter Turnout 78.48%	Rejected Ballots 6	

=== 2008 election ===
2008 Nunavut general election
Name	Vote	%
Lorne Kusugak	329	61.8%
Levinia Brown	203	38.2%
Total Valid Ballots	532	100%
Voter Turnout %	Rejected Ballots	

== See also ==
- List of Nunavut territorial electoral districts
- Canadian provincial electoral districts
