= Elisapee Sheutiapik =

Canadian politician

The Honourable Elisapee Sheutiapik MLA

Mayor of Iqaluit, Nunavut
- In office 2003 – December 13, 2010
- Preceded by: John Matthews
- Succeeded by: Madeleine Redfern

Member of the Legislative Assembly of Nunavut
- In office October 30, 2017 – September 20, 2021
- Preceded by: Paul Okalik
- Succeeded by: Janet Brewster
- Constituency: Iqaluit-Sinaa

Personal details
- Occupation: entrepreneur

Elisapee Sheutiapik is a Canadian politician, who served as mayor of Iqaluit, Nunavut, from 2003 to 2010, and was elected to the Legislative Assembly of Nunavut in the 2017 general election.

== Mayoralty ==
She won the mayoral election in 2003, defeating the incumbent mayor John Matthews by 40 votes, and was acclaimed to a second term in 2006.

On 10 September 2008, CBC North reported that Sheutiapik would be taking a leave of absence to run in the Nunavut election. She ran in Iqaluit West, which had the highest voter turnout at 90.2 per cent, but was defeated by incumbent MLA Paul Okalik by 44 votes. She subsequently returned to the mayor's chair.

On 19 October 2009, Sheutiapik won a third term as mayor of Iqaluit. Her opponent was former city councillor Jim Little, who took 42.3% of the vote as opposed to 57.7% for Sheutiapik. On November 9, 2010, she announced her resignation as mayor effective December 13. She was succeeded by Madeleine Redfern.

In the 2017 Nunavut territorial election, Sheutiapik again faced off against Okalik in the riding of Iqaluit-Sinaa. This time, she won with 44.8% of the vote, defeating him with 237 votes to 150, as well as two other candidates.

== Activism ==
Sheutiapik, whose sister Mary Ann was murdered by an abusive relative in 1997, has collaborated with Iqaluit-based rock singer Lucie Idlout on a national project to have cities across Canada name a city street "Angel" as a memorial to Canadian victims of domestic violence. As of 2014, cities that have named Angel Streets as part of the campaign included St. John's, Edmonton, Regina, Fredericton, Yellowknife and Kamloops.

== Electoral record ==
2008 Nunavut general election
Name	Vote	%
Paul Okalik	340	53.5%
Elisapee Sheutiapik	296	46.5%
Total Valid Ballots	636	100%
Voter Turnout %	Rejected Ballots	
