= David Akeeagok =

Canadian politician

The Honourable David Akeeagok MLA
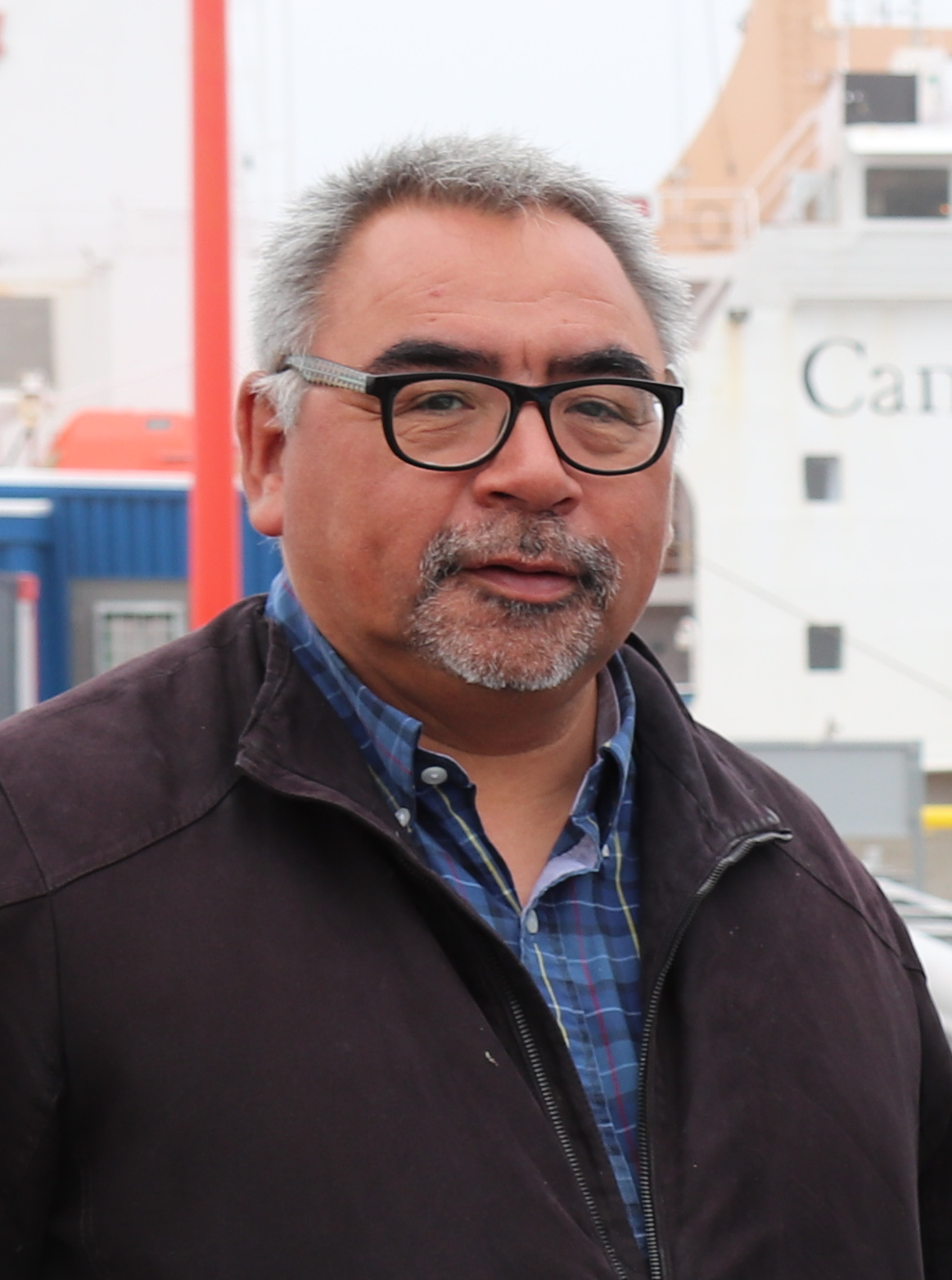
- Akeeagok in 2023

Deputy Premier of Nunavut
- In office June 14, 2018 – November 19, 2021
- Premier: Joe Savikataaq
- Preceded by: Joe Savikataaq
- Succeeded by: Pamela Gross

Member of the Legislative Assembly of Nunavut for Iqaluit-Niaqunnguu
- Incumbent
- Assumed office October 27, 2025
- Preceded by: P.J. Akeeagok

Member of the Legislative Assembly of Nunavut for Quttiktuq
- In office October 30, 2017 – September 22, 2025
- Preceded by: Isaac Shooyook
- Succeeded by: Steven Taqtu

David Akeeagok is a Canadian Inuk politician from Grise Fiord, Nunavut.

He was elected to the Legislative Assembly of Nunavut in the 2017 general election.

He represented the electoral district of Quttiktuq until 2025, and served as Nunavut's Deputy Premier, Ministry offices of Economic Development and Transportation, Workers' Safety and Compensation Commission, the Liquor Commission, the Liquor Licensing Board. His nephew, P.J. Akeeagok, is the former Premier of Nunavut. He ran for his nephew's seat of Iqaluit-Niaqunnguu in the 2025 general election, winning with 41.1%. He was nominated for the position of premier in the 2025 leadership forum, losing to John Main.
