= Margaret Nakashuk =

Canadian politician

Member of the Legislative Assembly of Nunavut for Pangnirtung
- In office October 30, 2017 – September 22, 2025
- Preceded by: Johnny Mike
- Succeeded by: Johnny Mike

Margaret Nakashuk is a Canadian politician from Pangnirtung, Nunavut. She was elected to the Legislative Assembly of Nunavut in the 2017 general election. She represented the electoral district of Pangnirtung until 2025.
