= Executive Council of Nunavut =

The Executive Council of Nunavut or cabinet includes a premier and eight ministers and is elected by the members of the Legislative Assembly from among the assembly members.

The executive council members provide the political direction and accountability for each function, while the deputy minister of each department is appointed position with responsibility to guide and manage the daily administration of the budgets and programs of the government of Nunavut.

As of 20 November 2025, the current ministers are:

Eva Aariak	Commissioner
Member	Minister / portfolio
John Main	Premier; Minister of Finance; Minister of Indigenous affairs Minister of Immigration; Minister of Executive and Intergovernmental Affairs; Minister responsible for Utilities Rights and Review Council; Minister responsible for Seniors; Minister responsible for Nunavut Liquor and Cannabis Commission; Minister responsible for Nunavut Liquor and Cannabis board
George Hickes	Deputy Premier; Minister of Justice; Minister of Transportation and Infrastructure Nunavut; Minister of Labour; Minister responsible Human Rights Tribunal
David Akeeagok	Government House Leader; Minister of Education; Minister responsible for Nunavut Arctic College
Janet Brewster	Minister of Health; Minister responsible for Suicide Prevention
Gwen Healey Akearok	Minister of Family Services; Minister of Qulliq Energy Corporation; Minister responsible for Status of Women; Minister responsible for Homelessness; Minister responsible for Poverty Reduction
Brian Koonoo	Minister of Culture and Heritage; Minister of Environment; Minister of Languages; Minister responsible for Energy
Cecile Nelvana Lyall	Minister responsible for the Nunavut Housing Corporation
Craig Simailak	Minister of Community Services; Minister responsible for Nunavut Business Credit Corporation; Minister responsible for Nunavut Development Corporation; Minister responsible for Mines; Minister responsible for Trade
Annie Tattuinee	Minister of Human Resources; Minister of Workers' Safety and Compensation Commission
