= Janet Brewster =

Canadian politician

The Honourable Janet Brewster MLA

Member of the Legislative Assembly of Nunavut for Iqaluit-Sinaa
- Incumbent
- Assumed office November 19, 2021
- Preceded by: Elisapee Sheutiapik

Member of the Executive Council of Nunavut
- Incumbent
- Assumed office November 20, 2025

Personal details
- Born: 1969 or 1970 (age 56–57)
- Party: non-partisan consensus government

Janet Pitsiulaaq Brewster (born 1969 or 1970) is a Canadian Inuk politician, who was elected to the Legislative Assembly of Nunavut in the 2021 Nunavut general election. She represents the electoral district of Iqaluit-Sinaa.

Prior to her election to the legislature, Brewster served on Iqaluit City Council, including a stint as deputy mayor of the city.

On June 2, 2022, during members' statements, Brewster came out as LGBTQ in a statement celebrating the legislature's decision to raise a pride flag for the first time, becoming the territory's first known LGBTQ holder of political office.
