= Iqaluit Centre =

Former territorial electoral district in Nunavut, Canada

Coordinates: 63.746°N 68.512°W

Iqaluit Centre was a territorial electoral district (riding) for the Legislative Assembly of Nunavut, Canada. The riding consisted of the community of Iqaluit.

Hunter Tootoo, former federal Minister of Fisheries, Oceans and the Canadian Coast Guard served as the Member of the Legislative Assembly for this riding until its disestablishment in 2013.

== Election results ==
=== 1999 election ===
1999 Nunavut general election
Name	Vote	%
Hunter Tootoo	261	54.95%
Lynda Gunn	95	20.00%
Johnny Nowdlak	64	13.47%
Bill Strickland	55	11.58%
Total Valid Ballots	475	100%
Voter Turnout %	Rejected Ballots	

=== 2004 election ===
2004 Nunavut general election
Name	Vote	%
Hunter Tootoo	263	44.80%
Mike Courtney	167	28.45%
Natsiq Alainga-Kango	78	13.29%
Mary Ellen Thomas	37	6.30%
Kevin MacCormack	29	4.94%
Pauloosie Paniloo	13	2.22%
Total Valid Ballots	587	100%
Voter Turnout 101.73%	Rejected Ballots 2	

=== 2008 election ===
2008 Nunavut general election
Name	Vote	%
Hunter Tootoo	317	61.7%
Madeleine Redfern	146	28.4%
Joe Sageaktook	51	9.9%
Total Valid Ballots	514	100%
Voter Turnout	Rejected Ballots	

== See also ==
- List of Nunavut territorial electoral districts
- Canadian provincial electoral districts
