= Lorne Kusugak =

Canadian politician

The Honourable Lorne Kusugak

MLA for Rankin Inlet South/Whale Cove
- In office October 27, 2008 – October 28, 2013
- Preceded by: Levinia Brown
- Succeeded by: riding dissolved

MLA for Rankin Inlet South
- In office October 30, 2017 – September 22, 2025
- Preceded by: Alexander Sammurtok
- Succeeded by: Annie Tattuinee

Personal details
- Born: 1959 or 1960 (age 65–66) Rankin Inlet, Northwest Territories
- Party: non-partisan consensus government

Lorne Kusugak is a Canadian politician who served as the member of the Legislative Assembly of Nunavut for the electoral district of Rankin Inlet South. Prior to becoming an MLA, Kusugak was the mayor of Rankin Inlet. Kusugak served as the Nunavut Minister for Community and Government Services, Minister for Energy and the Minister responsible for the Qulliq Energy Corporation.

Kusugak was first elected in the 2008 election, in the district of Rankin Inlet South/Whale Cove. In the 2013 election, Kusugak and challenger Alexander Sammurtok finished in an exact tie in the redistributed riding of Rankin Inlet South, forcing a by-election. Sammurtok won the by-election. In the 2017 election, Kusugak defeated Sammurtok to reclaim the seat.

== Biography ==
Kusugak was born in Rankin Inlet (then located in the Northwest Territories), one of the 11 children of a father who was a heavy equipment operator, and a mother who was a homemaker and a seamstress. In the mid-1970s, Kusugak attended high school in Yellowknife, Northwest Territories, and later returned to Rankin Inlet to assist his mother. Kusugak's first job was with the Canadian Broadcasting Corporation (CBC), which employed him as the first CBC reporter in his home town. For the next 15 years, Kusugak worked as a CBC broadcaster in several positions, both at home in Rankin Inlet and in Iqaluit. While working in these positions, he was one of the founders of the Inuit Broadcasting Corporation, a television broadcaster featuring programs almost entirely broadcast in Inuktitut.

Kusugak has served as Chief Executive Officer of the Nunavut Implementation Training Committee and the Executive Director of the Kivalliq Inuit Association. He served three consecutive terms as the Mayor of Rankin Inlet for six years before being elected as a Member of the Legislative Assembly of Nunavut for the electoral district of Rankin Inlet South/Whale Cove in the 2008 territorial election. Kusugak defeated the incumbent Member and Deputy Premier of Nunavut, Levinia Brown, with 62% of the vote. Over the course of his first term, he served as Government House Leader, Minister of Community and Government Services and Minister responsible for the Workers’ Safety and Compensation Commission.

Kusugak was re-elected on October 30, 2017, to represent the constituency of Rankin Inlet South in the 5th Legislative Assembly. Over the course of this term, he served as Minister of Community and Government Services, Minister of Human Resources, Minister Responsible for Suicide Prevention, and Minister Responsible for Seniors. In November 2020, Premier Joe Savikataaq appointed Kusugak as Minister of Health, assigning him responsibility for leading the Nunavut response to the COVID-19 pandemic.

== Personal life ==
Kusugak is married to his wife Sally and has three daughters; Kandace, Nuatii and Terrie.
