= Alexander Sammurtok =

Canadian politician

Alexander Sammurtok MLA

Member of the Legislative Assembly of Nunavut for Rankin Inlet South
- In office February 10, 2014 – September 24, 2017
- Preceded by: Riding Established
- Succeeded by: Lorne Kusugak

Member of the Legislative Assembly of Nunavut for Rankin Inlet North-Chesterfield Inlet
- Incumbent
- Assumed office November 19, 2021
- Preceded by: Cathy Towtongie

Personal details
- Born: 1952 or 1953 (age 72–73)
- Party: non-partisan consensus government

Alexander Sammurtok (born 1952 or 1953) is a Canadian politician, who was elected to the Legislative Assembly of Nunavut in a by-election on February 10, 2014. Sammurtok first ran in the 2013 election, but finished in an exact tie with incumbent MLA Lorne Kusugak in the redistributed district of Rankin Inlet South.

He is the nephew of Tom Sammurtok, who was the MLA for the neighbouring electoral district of Rankin Inlet North-Chesterfield Inlet. Both Alexander and Tom Sammurtok were defeated in the 2017 Nunavut general election, Alexander by Kusugak and Tom by Cathy Towtongie; in the 2021 Nunavut general election, Alexander Sammurtok ran in Rankin Inlet North and defeated Towtongie.
