= David Joanasie =

Canadian Inuk politician

The Honourable David Joanasie MLA
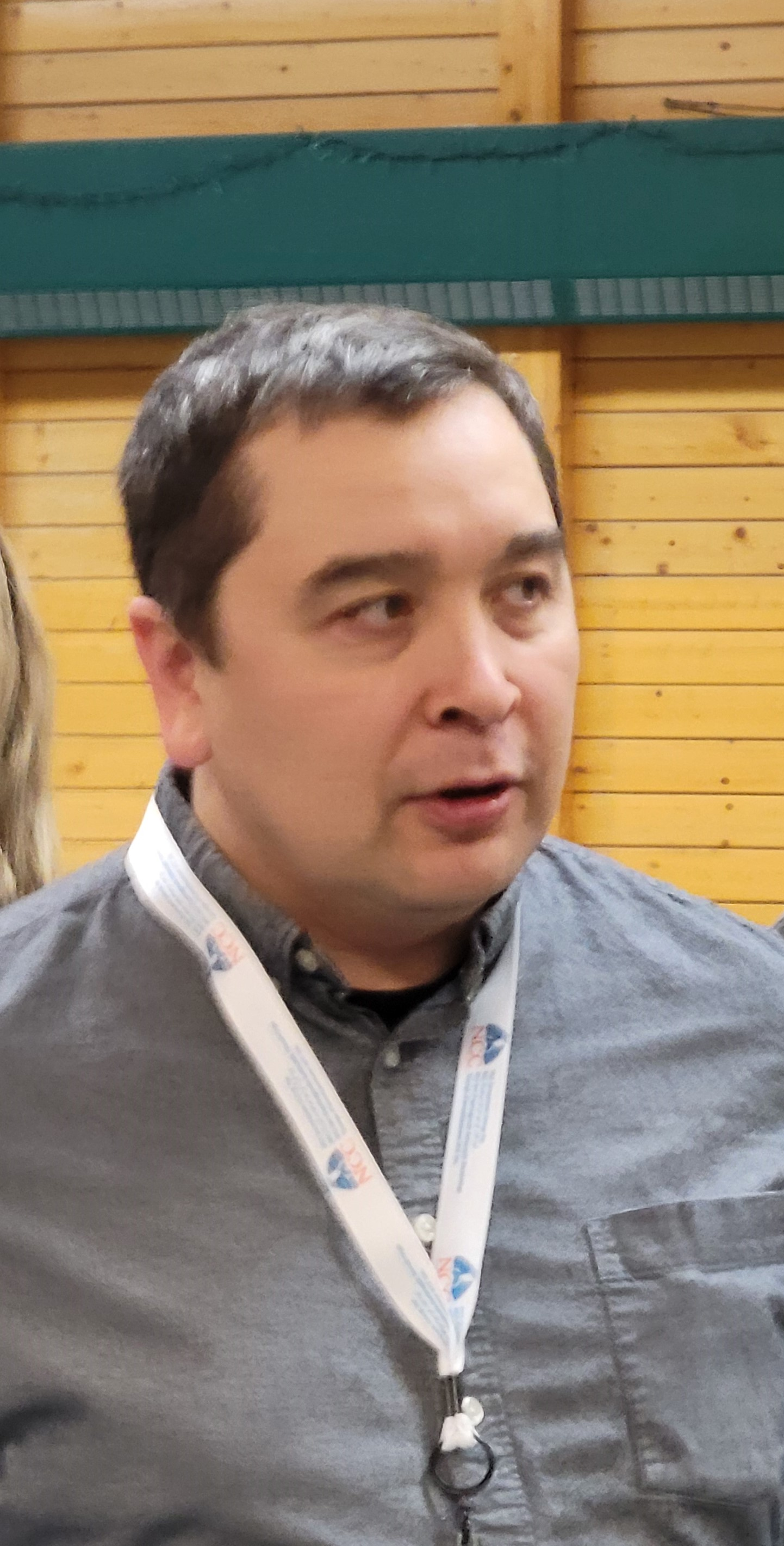

13th Speaker of the Legislative Assembly of Nunavut
- Incumbent
- Assumed office November 18, 2025
- Preceded by: Tony Akoak

Member of the Legislative Assembly of Nunavut for South Baffin
- Incumbent
- Assumed office October 28, 2013
- Preceded by: Fred Schell

Personal details
- Party: non-partisan consensus government

David Joanasie is a Canadian Inuk politician from Kinngait, Nunavut. He was elected to the Legislative Assembly of Nunavut in the 2013 election. He represents the electoral district of South Baffin. Joanasie is the current Speaker of the Legislative Assembly of Nunavut.

== Education ==
David attended school at Kinngait and learned Inuktitut up until third grade. He graduated from Peter Pitseolak High School in 2001 and was interested in mathematics. He eventually earned a certificate in business communication from Saint Mary’s University in Halifax and a diploma from Algonquin College.

== Career ==
=== Pre-legislative assembly ===
Before his election, he was the Communications Manager of the Qikiqtani Inuit Association and worked for the Inuit Tapiriit Kanatami.

=== Elections ===
He was elected twice to serve in the 5th Legislative Assembly of Nunavut. He was re-elected to represent the constituency of South Baffin. He was also elected to serve in the Executive Council on November 17, 2017. He was sworn into office on November 21, 2017. He currently serves as the Minister of Education, Minister of Culture and Heritage, and Minister of Languages.

== Personal life ==
David is married to Emily Joanasie, and together they have five children: Sayri, Cynthia, Qulittalik, Pittaaluk, and Pattu.

In July 2013, David was arrested for drunk driving in Prince Edward Island. He pleaded guilty and was sent to jail, paying a $1200 fine and $500 in victim sub-charges.
