= Joe Savikataaq =

Canadian politician

The Honourable Joe Savikataaq
- ᔫ ᓴᕕᑲᑖᖅ
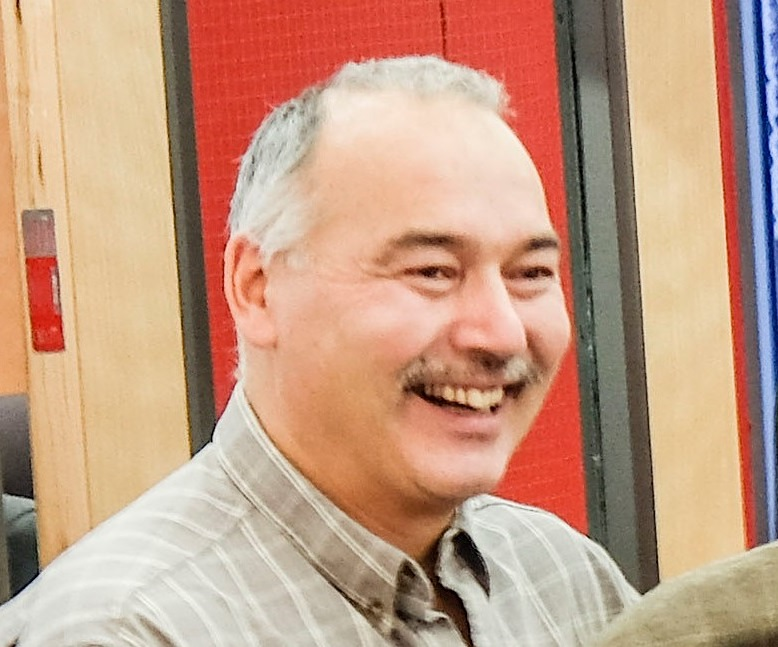
- Savikataaq in 2015

5th Premier of Nunavut
- In office June 14, 2018 – November 19, 2021
- Commissioner: Nellie Kusugak; Rebekah Williams (Acting); Eva Aariak
- Preceded by: Paul Quassa
- Succeeded by: P.J. Akeeagok

Member of the Legislative Assembly of Nunavut for Arviat South
- In office October 28, 2013 – September 22, 2025
- Preceded by: riding established
- Succeeded by: Jamie Kablutsiak

Personal details
- Born: December 8, 1960 (age 65)
- Party: Non-Partisan
- Spouse: Susan Savikataaq
- Children: 3
- Occupation: Former conservation officer, MLA in Nunavut and Premier of Nunavut

Joe Savikataaq (Inuktitut: ᔫ ᓴᕕᑲᑖᖅ; born c. 1960) is a Canadian politician who served as the fifth premier of Nunavut from 2018 to 2021. He was elected premier on June 14, 2018, by the Legislative Assembly of Nunavut, after his predecessor Paul Quassa lost a no-confidence vote.

== Politics ==
Savikataaq was first elected to the Legislative Assembly of Nunavut in the 2013 election and represents the electoral district of Arviat South. He was re-elected in the same district in 2017.

Savikataaq served in numerous political positions since entering politics. These include Deputy Premier of Nunavut, Minister of Economic Development and Transportation of Nunavut, Minister of Community and Government Services of Nunavut, and Minister of Energy of Nunavut.

Savikataaq was elected as premier on June 14, 2018. He was re-elected in the 2021 election. P.J. Akeeagok was selected to become premier in the Nunavut Leadership Forum on November 17, 2021, defeating Savikataaq.

== Personal life ==
Prior to politics, Savikataaq worked as a conservation officer for almost 30 years. He is a scuba diver and a small airplane pilot.

He is married to Susan Savikataaq, and has 3 children, Joe Jr., Wendy, and Jamie. He has 9 grandchildren.

His son, Joe Savikataaq Jr., became mayor of Arviat in March 2020 following the death of Bob Leonard.
