= Tony Akoak =

Canadian politician

12th Speaker of the Legislative Assembly of Nunavut
- In office 2021–2025
- Preceded by: Paul Quassa
- Succeeded by: David Joanasie

Member of the Legislative Assembly of Nunavut for Gjoa Haven
- In office October 28, 2013 – September 22, 2025
- Preceded by: Riding Established
- Succeeded by: David Porter

Personal details
- Born: 1957 or 1958 (age 67–68)
- Party: non-partisan consensus government

Tony Akoak (born 1957 or 1958) is a Canadian politician, who was the 12th Speaker of the Legislative Assembly of Nunavut. He was elected to the Legislative Assembly of Nunavut in the 2013 election. He represented the electoral district of Gjoa Haven until 2025.
