= George Hickes (Nunavut politician) =

Canadian politician

The Honourable George Hickes MLA

Member of the Legislative Assembly of Nunavut for Iqaluit-Tasiluk
- Incumbent
- Assumed office October 28, 2013
- Preceded by: Riding established

Deputy Premier of Nunavut
- Incumbent
- Assumed office November 20, 2025
- Premier: John Main
- Preceded by: Pam Gross

Personal details
- Born: 1968 or 1969 (age 57–58) Churchill, Manitoba, Canada
- Party: non-partisan consensus government

George Hickes, Jr. MLA is a Canadian politician, who was elected to represent the district of Iqaluit-Tasiluk in the Legislative Assembly of Nunavut in the 2013 election, defeating sitting Nunavut Premier Eva Aariak.

Born in Churchill, Manitoba, Hickes is the son of George Hickes, the former speaker of the Legislative Assembly of Manitoba, and the cousin of former Nunavut MP, Hunter Tootoo and hockey player Jordin Tootoo. Prior to his election to the legislature, Hickes worked as a civil servant in the government of Nunavut, and as a communications manager for Qulliq Energy.

Hickes was elected to Cabinet in the 4th Legislative Assembly of Nunavut on November 9, 2015. He was first named Minister responsible for the Nunavut Housing Corporation and Minister responsible for the Qulliq Energy Corporation in November 2015, and then held the portfolios of Minister of Health and Minister responsible for Suicide Prevention as of June 2016. Minister Hickes previously held the Minister of Finance portfolio.

In 2021, Hickes was re-elected to serve in the 6th Legislative Assembly. He is currently a member and represents the constituency of Iqaluit-Tasiluk.
