= Premier of Nunavut =

First minister of Nunavut

- ᓯᕗᓕᖅᑎ ᓄᓇᕗᒻᒥ; Hivuliqti Nunavunmi (Inuktitut); Premier ministre du Nunavut (French)
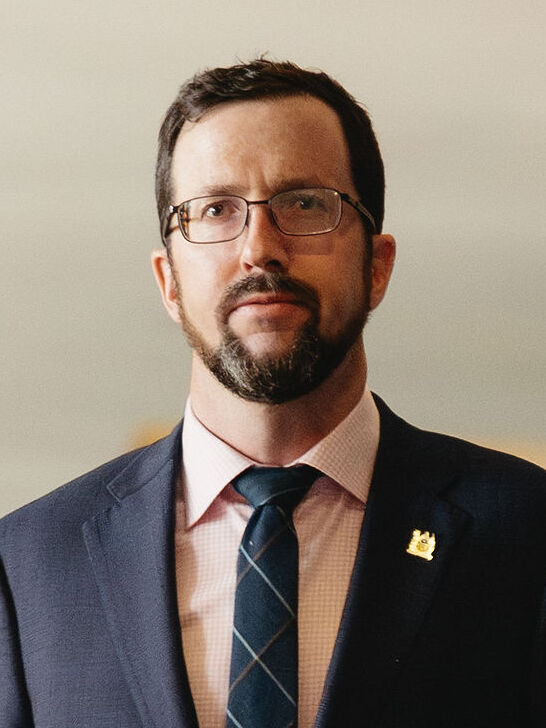
- Incumbent; John Main since November 20, 2025
- Office of the Premier
- Style: The Honourable (formal); Premier (informal)
- Status: Head of Government
- Member of: Legislative Assembly; Executive Council
- Reports to: Legislative Assembly; Commissioner
- Seat: Iqaluit
- Appointer: Commissioner of Nunavut; with the confidence of the Nunavut Legislature
- Term length: For a term not longer than the life of the current Assembly; contingent on the premier's ability to command confidence in the legislative assembly
- Formation: April 1, 1999
- First holder: Paul Okalik
- Deputy: Deputy premier of Nunavut
- Website: Office of the Premier

The premier of Nunavut (Inuktitut: ᓯᕗᓕᖅᑎ ᓄᓇᕗᒻᒥ; Inuinnaqtun: Hivuliqti Nunavunmi; French: premier ministre du Nunavut) is the first minister for the Canadian territory of Nunavut. The premier is the territory's head of government, elected by and accountable to all Members of the Assembly. The powers of the Premier center on three elements: the ability to include (or exclude or delay) items from the cabinet agenda; the ability to allocate and re-assign, if desired, the portfolios of those Ministers elected by the Assembly; and the ability to appoint and remove Department Heads (Deputy Ministers). Unlike a provincial Premier, the Nunavut Premier does not select or dismiss Ministers and does not control a party apparatus assuring the passage of legislation in the Assembly.

Unlike most other premiers who are officially appointed by a lieutenant governor or commissioner on account of their leadership of a majority bloc in the legislature, the premier, and the Cabinet, is directly elected by the non-partisan members of the Legislative Assembly of Nunavut, in accordance with the system of consensus government. The premier is formally appointed by the commissioner of Nunavut, but this is nominal as the Commissioner is bound to act on the Assembly's recommendation by both the Nunavut Act and convention.

== History ==
The territory's first premier, Paul Okalik, was elected after the 1999 general elections. He was re-elected to a second term after the 2004 general elections. Although Okalik was re-elected to a third term after the 2008 general elections in the Iqaluit West riding, he was defeated by newly elected MLA Eva Aariak in the premiership vote on November 14. On November 15, 2013, Peter Taptuna beat out Okalik and Paul Quassa for the position of premier. Quassa was elected in 2017 but lost a confidence vote in 2018 which led to the election of Joe Savikataaq. P.J. Akeeagok was selected to become premier in the Nunavut Leadership Forum on November 17, 2021 defeating Savikataaq. John Main succeeded Akeeagok in 2025, becoming the first non-Inuk premier in territory history.

== See also ==
- Prime Minister of Canada
- List of premiers of Nunavut
