= Legislative Assembly of Nunavut =

Unicameral legislature of Nunavut

Coordinates: 63°45′01″N 068°31′24″W

Legislative Assembly of Nunavut ᓄᓇᕗᒥ ᒪᓕᒐᓕᐅᕐᕕᐊ Nunavut Maligaliurvia Assemblée législative du Nunavut
- 7th Nunavut Legislature

Type
- Type: Unicameral

History
- Founded: 1999
- Preceded by: Legislative Assembly of the Northwest Territories

Leadership
- Speaker: David Joanasie, non-partisan since November 18, 2025
- Premier: John Main, non-partisan since November 20, 2025

Structure
- Seats: 22
- Political groups: Non-aligned assembly (Consensus based): Members (22)

Elections
- Last election: 27 October 2025
- Next election: 2029

Meeting place
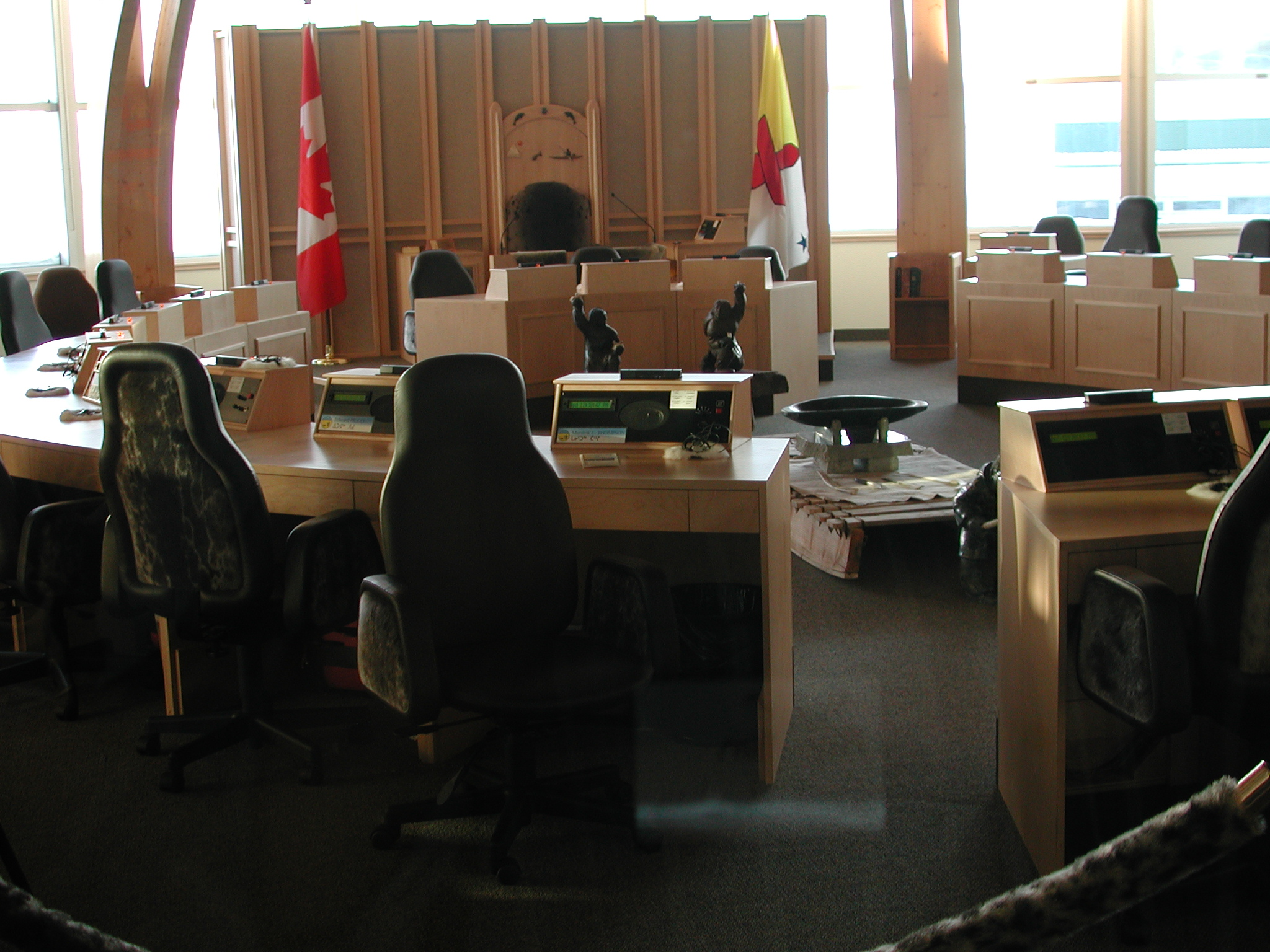
- Legislative Chamber; Legislative Building, Iqaluit, Nunavut, Canada

Website
- assembly.nu.ca

The Legislative Assembly of Nunavut is the elected assembly of the Legislature of the Canadian territory of Nunavut. The seat of the Assembly is the Legislative Building of Nunavut in Iqaluit. The Legislature is composed of the Assembly and the Commissioner of Nunavut, appointed by the federal government.

Prior to the creation of Nunavut as a Canadian territory on 1 April 1999, the 1999 Nunavut general election was held on 15 February to determine the 1st Nunavut Legislature. The Legislative Assembly was opened by Elizabeth II, Queen of Canada, on 7 October 2002, during her Golden Jubilee tour of Canada. In her speech the Queen stated: "I am proud to be the first member of the Canadian Royal Family to be greeted in Canada's newest territory."

Prior to the opening of the Legislative Building in October 1999 the members met in the gymnasium of the Inuksuk High School.

The Hansard of the assembly is published in Inuktitut (syllabics) and English, making the territory one of three Canadian jurisdictions to produce a bilingual Hansard, along with the Legislative Assembly of New Brunswick and both houses of the Parliament of Canada in Ottawa, Ontario.

The territory operates by consensus government; there are no political parties. Approximately two weeks after an election, the newly elected legislature meets in a special session called the Nunavut Leadership Forum to select the Executive Council, or cabinet.

Members of the Legislative Assembly are sworn in by the commissioner of Nunavut.

== Current members ==
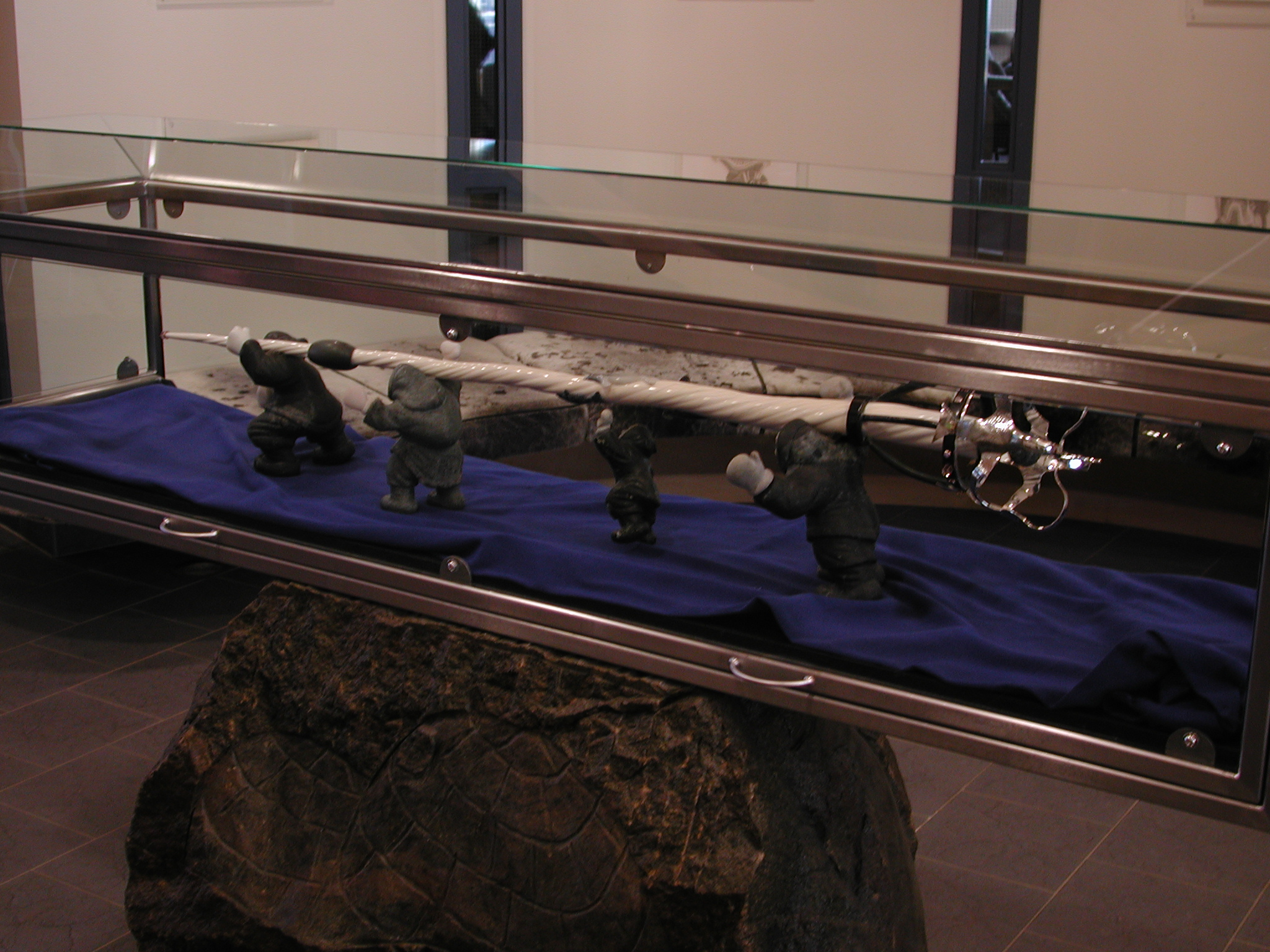
Ceremonial mace of the Legislative Assembly of Nunavut

There are currently 22 seats in the legislature. The current assembly, the 7th Nunavut Legislature, had its membership selected in the 2025 election.

Constituency	Member	Portfolio	First elected / previously elected	No. of terms
Aggu	Edward Attagutaluk		2025	1st term
Aivilik	Hannah Angootealuk		2025	1st term
Amittuq	Abraham Qammaniq		2025	1st term
Arviat North-Whale Cove	John Main	Premier; Minister of Finance; Minister of Indigenous affairs Minister of Immigration; Minister of Executive and Intergovernmental Affairs; Minister responsible for Utilities Rights and Review Council; Minister responsible for Seniors; Minister responsible for Nunavut Liquor and Cannabis Commission; Minister responsible for Nunavut Liquor and Cannabis board	2017	3rd term
Arviat South	Jamie Kablutsiak		2025	1st term
Baker Lake	Craig Simailak	Minister of Community Services; Minister responsible for Nunavut Business Credit Corporation; Minister responsible for Nunavut Development Corporation; Minister responsible for Mines; Minister responsible for Trade	2020	3rd term
Cambridge Bay	Fred Pedersen		2025	1st term
Gjoa Haven	David Porter		2025	1st term
Hudson Bay	Jason Iqaluq		2026	1st term
Iqaluit-Manirajak	Gwen Healey Akearok	Minister of Family Services; Minister of Qulliq Energy Corporation; Minister responsible for Status of Women; Minister responsible for Homelessness; Minister responsible for Poverty Reduction	2025	1st term
Iqaluit-Niaqunnguu	David Akeeagok	Government House Leader; Minister of Education; Minister responsible for Nunavut Arctic College	2017	3rd term
Iqaluit-Sinaa	Janet Brewster	Minister of Health; Minister responsible for Suicide Prevention	2021	2nd term
Iqaluit-Tasiluk	George Hickes	Deputy Premier; Minister of Justice; Minister of Transportation and Infrastructure Nunavut; Minister of Labour; Minister responsible Human Rights Tribunal	2013	4th term
Kugluktuk	Simon Kuliktana		2025	1st term
Netsilik	Cecile Nelvana Lyall	Minister responsible for Nunavut Housing Corporation	2025	1st term
Pangnirtung	Johnny Mike		2013, 2025	2nd term*
Quttiktuq	Steven Taqtu		2025	1st term
Rankin Inlet North-Chesterfield Inlet	Alexander Sammurtok		2014, 2021	3rd term*
Rankin Inlet South	Annie Tattuinee	Minister of Human Resources; Minister of Workers' Safety and Compensation Commission	2025	1st term
South Baffin	David Joanasie	Speaker of the Legislative Assembly of Nunavut	2013	4th term
Tununiq	Brian Koonoo	Minister of Culture and Heritage; Minister of Environment; Minister of Languages; Minister responsible for Energy	2025	1st term
Uqqummiut	Gordon Kautuk		2025	1st term

== Notes ==
^{A} After recount
^{B} Acclaimed

== G7 Summit 2010 ==
G7 finance ministers met at the Legislative Building in February 2010 for a two-day meeting. Security at the summit was provided by the Royal Canadian Mounted Police (RCMP).

== See also ==
- List of Nunavut general elections
