= List of schools in Nunavut =

This is a list of schools in Nunavut, Canada, sorted by school name.

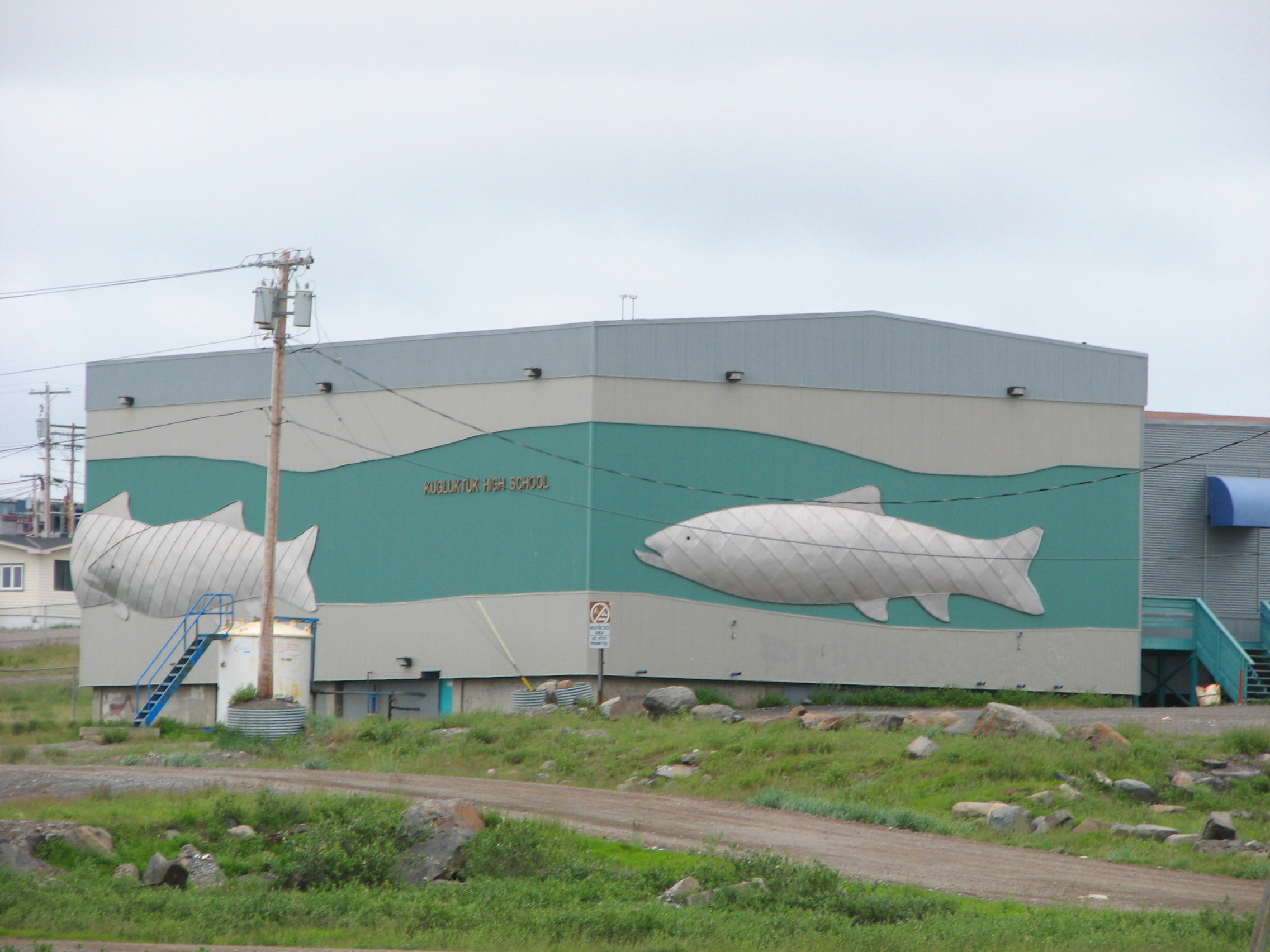
Kugluktuk High School, Kugluktuk

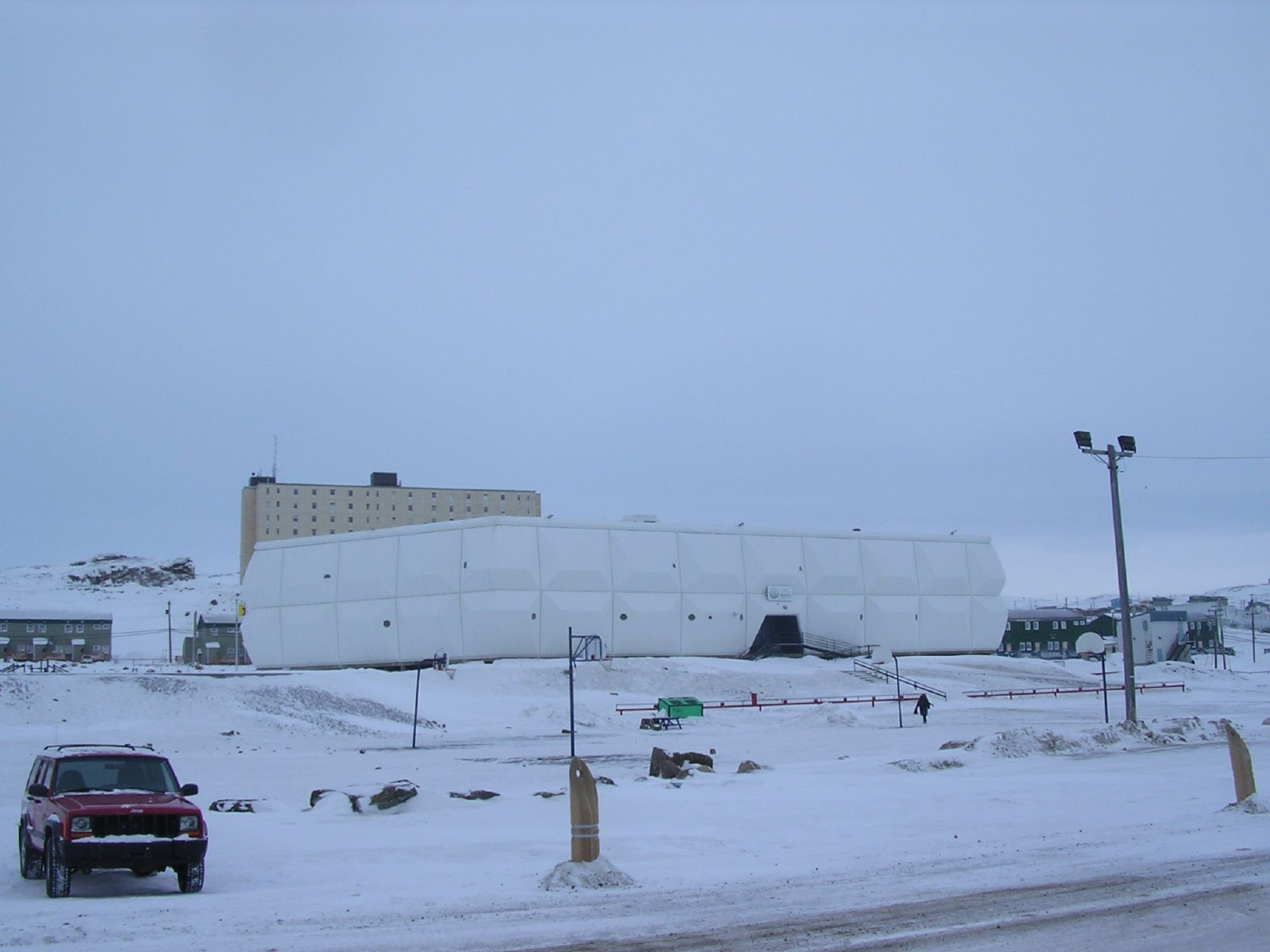
Nakasuk School, Iqaluit

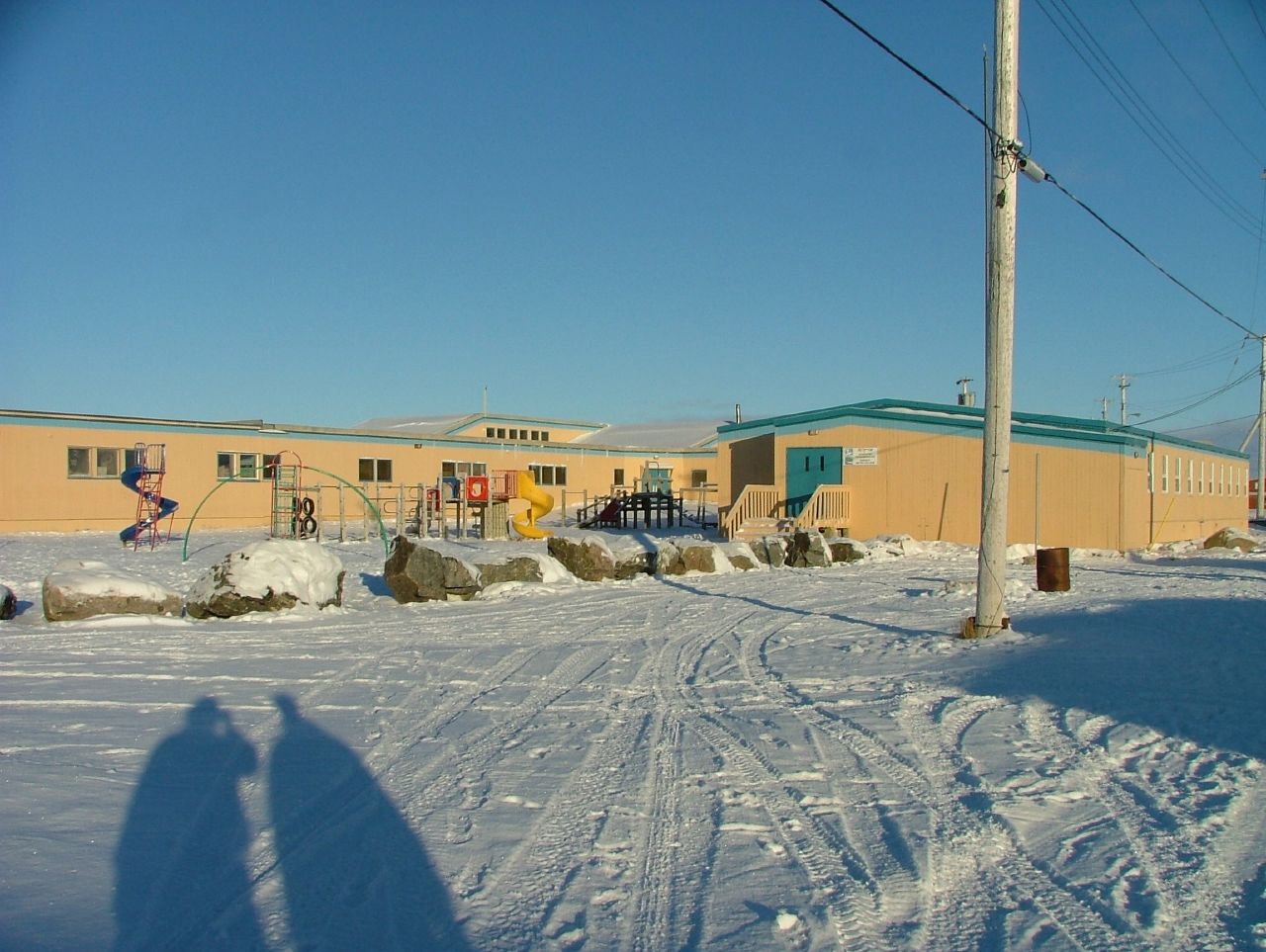
Sakku School, Coral Harbour

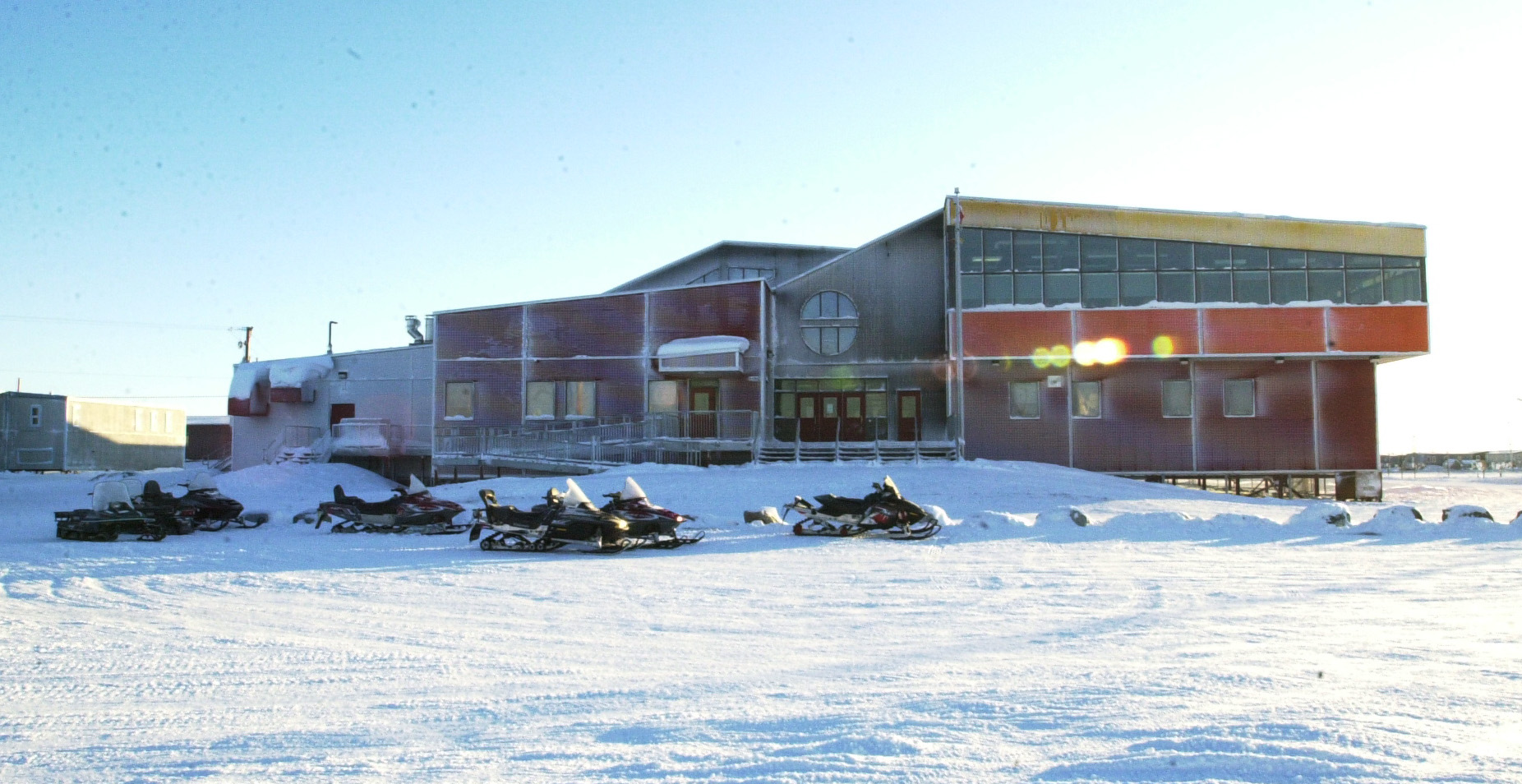
John Arnalukjuak High School, Arviat

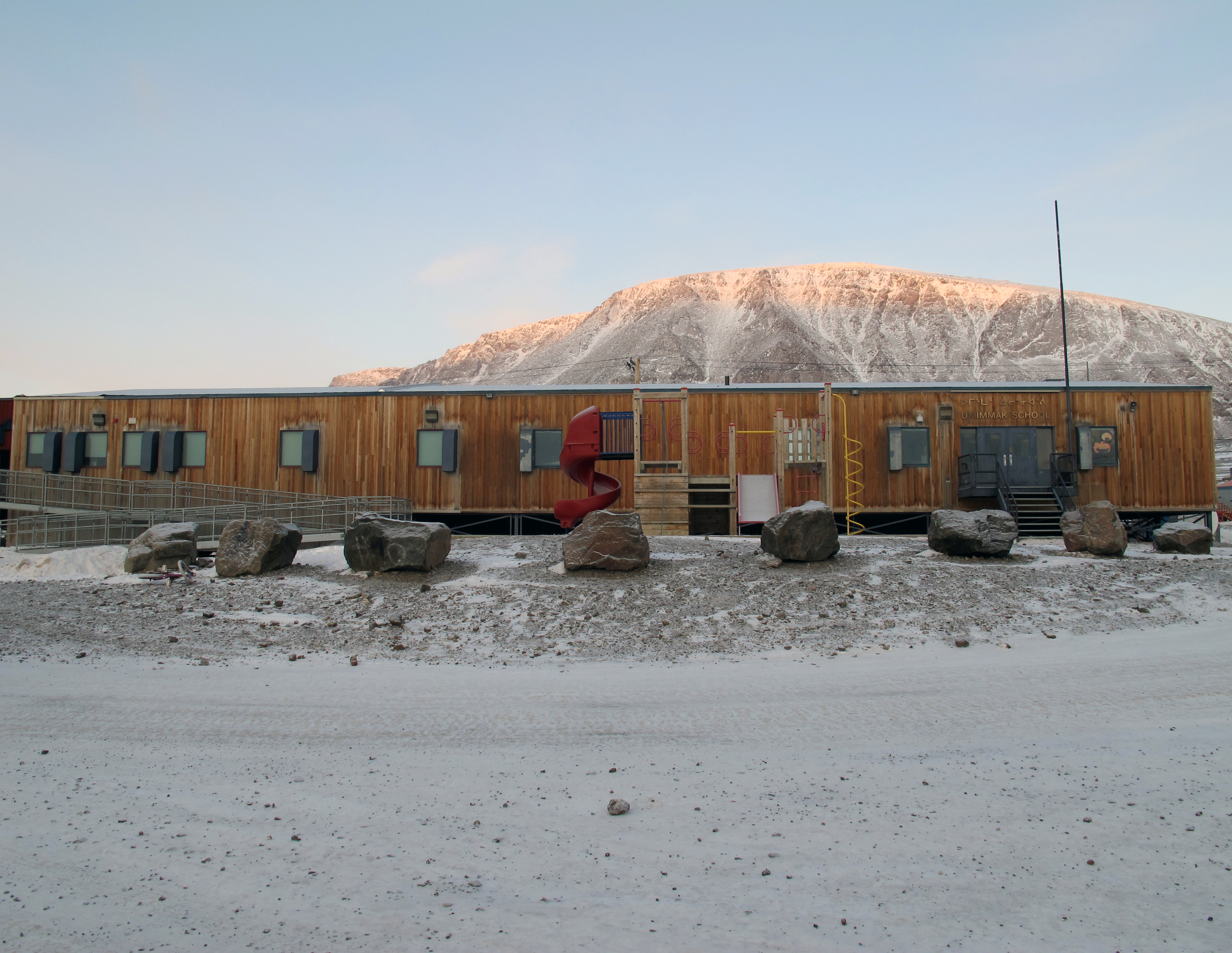
Umimmak School, Grise Fiord

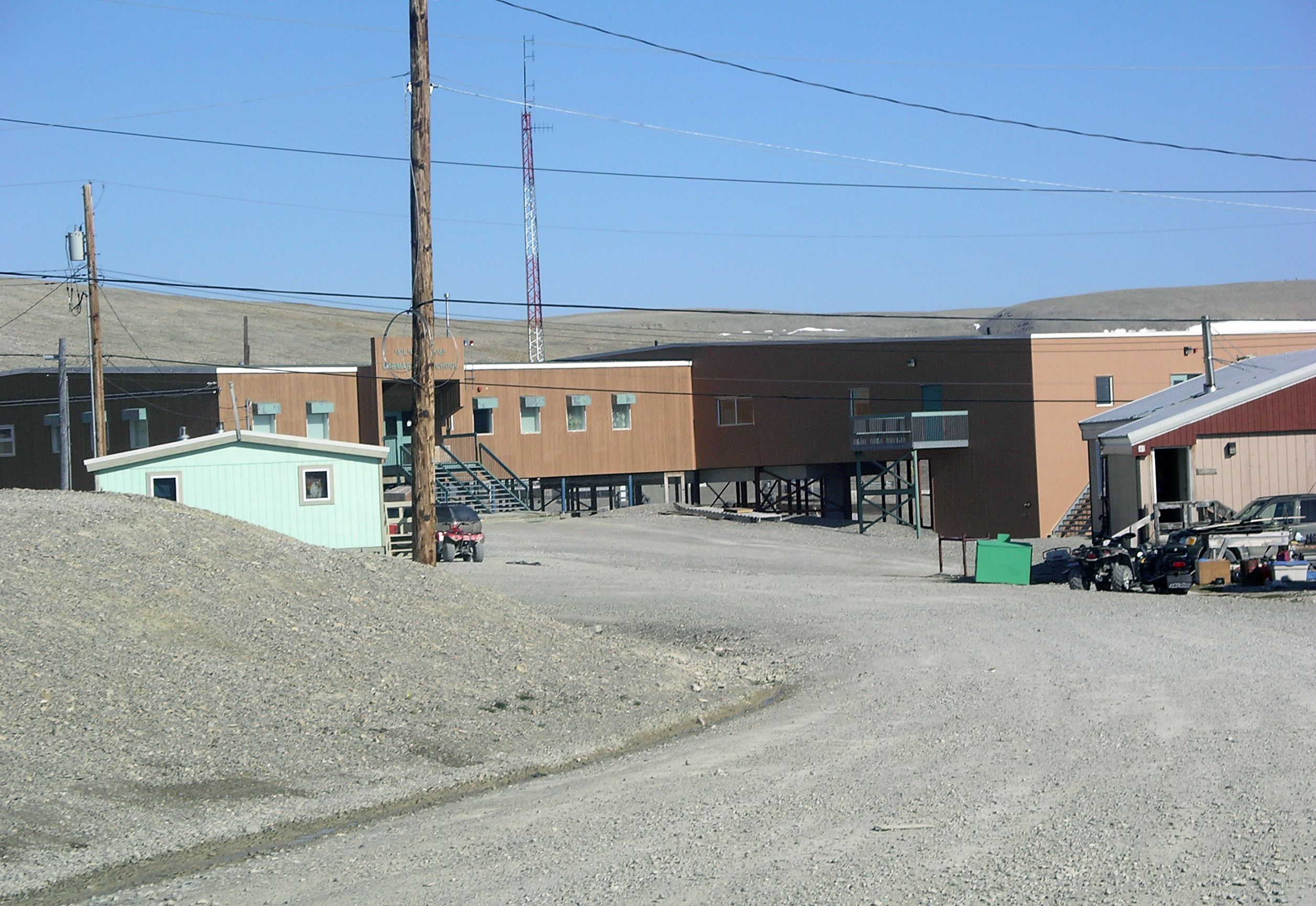
Qarmartalik School, Resolute

Sortable table
Name	Community	Region	Regional governing body	Grades available
Alookie School	Pangnirtung	Qikiqtaaluk	Qikiqtani School Operations	Kindergarten–5
Aqsarniit Ilinniarvik School	Iqaluit	Qikiqtaaluk	Qikiqtani School Operations	6–8
Arnaqjuaq School	Sanirajak	Qikiqtaaluk	Qikiqtani School Operations	Kindergarten–12
Ataguttaaluk Elementary School	Igloolik	Qikiqtaaluk	Qikiqtani School Operations	Kindergarten–7
Ataguttaaluk High School	Igloolik	Qikiqtaaluk	Qikiqtani School Operations	8–12
Attagoyuk School	Pangnirtung	Qikiqtaaluk	Qikiqtani School Operations	6–12
École des Trois-Soleils	Iqaluit	Qikiqtaaluk	La commission scolaire francophone du Nunavut	1–9
Inuglak School	Whale Cove	Kivalliq	Kivalliq School Operations	Kindergarten–12
Inuksuit School	Qikiqtarjuaq	Qikiqtaaluk	Qikiqtani School Operations	Kindergarten–12
Inuksuk High School	Iqaluit	Qikiqtaaluk	Qikiqtani School Operations	9–12
Inuujaq School	Arctic Bay	Qikiqtaaluk	Qikiqtani School Operations	Kindergarten–12
Jimmy Hikok Ilihakvik	Kugluktuk	Kitikmeot	Kitikmeot School Operations	Kindergarten–6
Joamie Ilinniarvik School	Iqaluit	Qikiqtaaluk	Qikiqtani School Operations	6–8
John Arnalukjuak High School	Arviat	Kivalliq	Kivalliq School Operations	9–12
Jonah Amitnaaq Secondary School	Baker Lake	Kivalliq	Kivalliq School Operations	6–12
Kiilinik High School	Cambridge Bay	Kitikmeot	Kitikmeot School Operations	7–12
Kugaardjuq School	Kugaaruk	Kitikmeot	Kitikmeot School Operations	Kindergarten–12
Kugluktuk High School	Kugluktuk	Kitikmeot	Kitikmeot School Operations	7–12
Kullik Ilihakvik	Cambridge Bay	Kitikmeot	Kitikmeot School Operations	Kindergarten–6
Leo Ussak School	Rankin Inlet	Kivalliq	Kivalliq School Operations	Kindergarten–4
Levi Angmak Elementary School	Arviat	Kivalliq	Kivalliq School Operations	Kindergarten–5
Maani Ulujuk School	Rankin Inlet	Kivalliq	Kivalliq School Operations	7–12
Nakasuk School	Iqaluit	Qikiqtaaluk	Qikiqtani School Operations	Kindergarten–5
Nanook Elementary School	Apex, Iqaluit	Qikiqtaaluk	Qikiqtani School Operations	Kindergarten–5
Nasivvik High School	Pond Inlet	Qikiqtaaluk	Qikiqtani School Operations	6–12
Netsilik School	Taloyoak	Kitikmeot	Kitikmeot School Operations	Kindergarten–12
Nuiyak School	Sanikiluaq	Qikiqtaaluk	Qikiqtani School Operations	Kindergarten–6
Paatsaali School	Sanikiluaq	Qikiqtaaluk	Qikiqtani School Operations	7–12
Peter Pitseolak School	Cape Dorset	Qikiqtaaluk	Qikiqtani School Operations	8–12
Qaqqalik School	Kimmirut	Qikiqtaaluk	Qikiqtani School Operations	Kindergarten–12
Qarmartalik School	Resolute	Qikiqtaaluk	Qikiqtani School Operations	Kindergarten–12
Qiqirtaq Ilihakvik	Gjoa Haven	Kitikmeot	Kitikmeot School Operations	7–12
Qitiqliq Middle School	Arviat	Kivalliq	Kivalliq School Operations	6–8
Quluaq School	Clyde River	Qikiqtaaluk	Qikiqtani School Operations	Kindergarten–12
Quqshuun Ilihakvik Centre	Gjoa Haven	Kitikmeot	Kitikmeot School Operations	Kindergarten–6
Rachel Arngnammaktiq Elementary School	Baker Lake	Kivalliq	Kivalliq School Operations	Kindergarten–5
Sakku School	Coral Harbour	Kivalliq	Kivalliq School Operations	Kindergarten–12
Sam Pudlat School	Cape Dorset	Qikiqtaaluk	Qikiqtani School Operations	Kindergarten–7
Simon Alaittuq School	Rankin Inlet	Kivalliq	Kivalliq School Operations	5–6
Tuugaalik High School	Naujaat	Kivalliq	Kivalliq School Operations	7–12
Tusarvik School	Naujaat	Kivalliq	Kivalliq School Operations	Kindergarten–12
Ulaajuk School	Pond Inlet	Qikiqtaaluk	Qikiqtani School Operations	Kindergarten–5
Umimmak School	Grise Fiord	Qikiqtaaluk	Qikiqtani School Operations	Kindergarten–12
Victor Sammurtok School	Chesterfield Inlet	Kivalliq	Kivalliq School Operations	Kindergarten–12

== See also ==
List of schools in Canada
