= Moore Island (Belcher Islands) =

Uninhabited island in the Qikiqtaaluk Region, Nunavut, Canada

- Location within Nunavut Location within Canada

Geography
- Location: Hudson Bay
- Coordinates: 56°20′N 79°33′W
- Archipelago: Belcher Islands; Arctic Archipelago

Administration
- Canada
- Territory: Nunavut
- Region: Qikiqtaaluk

Demographics
- Population: Uninhabited

Moore Island is an uninhabited island in the Qikiqtaaluk Region, Nunavut, Canada. It is a member of the Belcher Islands group in Hudson Bay. It lies in Churchill Sound between Kugong Island to its west and the Howard Peninsula of Flaherty Island to its east with the Inuit community of Sanikiluaq about 30 km (19 mi) northeast.

Other islands in the immediate vicinity include Ney Island and Renouf Island.

It is named in honour of Elwood S. Moore, Professor of Geology at Pennsylvania State University, and Fellow of the American Geographical Society.
