= Peter Kattuk =

Canadian politician (1950–2019)

MLA for Hudson Bay
- In office 1999–2008
- Preceded by: new district
- Succeeded by: Allan Rumbolt

Personal details
- Born: 2 June 1950 Belcher Islands, Northwest Territories, Canada
- Died: 20 November 2019 (aged 69) Sanikiluaq, Nunavut, Canada
- Party: non-partisan consensus government

Peter Kattuk (2 June 1950 – 20 November 2019) was a Canadian politician from Nunavut.

== Early life ==
He was born in the Belcher Islands, Northwest Territories (now Nunavut) and lived in Sanikiluaq.

== Career ==
He was the Member of the Legislative Assembly (MLA) for the electoral district of Hudson Bay in the Legislative Assembly of Nunavut from 1999 to 2008.

Prior to becoming an MLA, Kattuk was the mayor of Sanikiluaq and worked with local organizations.

== Death ==
He died in 2019 at the age of 69.
