= Belcher Islands =

Island group in Nunavut, Canada

Native name: ᓴᓪᓚᔪᒐᐃᑦ Sanikiluaq
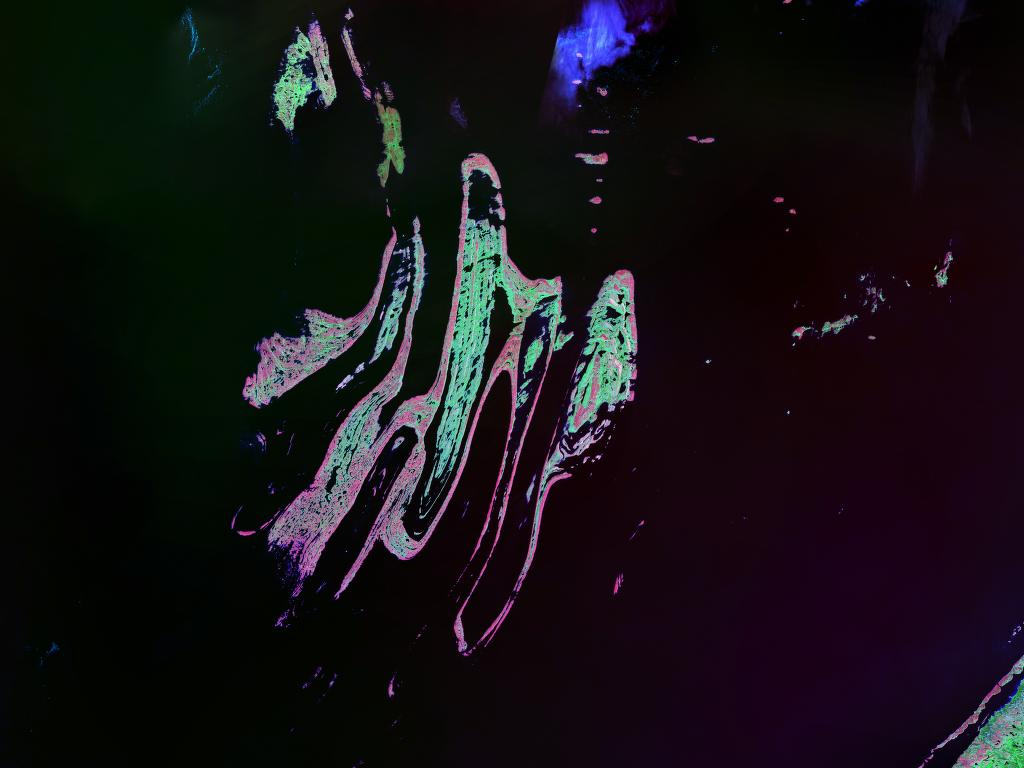
- Landsat satellite photo of Belcher Islands

- Location within Nunavut Location within Canada

Geography
- Location: Hudson Bay
- Coordinates: 56°11′N 79°15′W
- Archipelago: Belcher Islands Archipelago
- Total islands: 1,500
- Major islands: Flaherty Island, Kugong Island, Tukarak Island, Innetalling Island
- Area: 2,896 km^{2} (1,118 sq mi)

Administration
- Canada
- Territory: Nunavut
- Region: Qikiqtaaluk

Demographics
- Population: 1,010 (2021)
- Pop. density: 0.35/km^{2} (0.91/sq mi)
- Ethnic groups: Inuit

The Belcher Islands (Inuktitut: ᓴᓪᓚᔪᒐᐃᑦ, romanized: Sanikiluaq) are an archipelago in the southeast part of Hudson Bay near the centre of the Nastapoka arc. The Belcher Islands are spread out over almost 13,000 km^{2} (5,000 sq mi). Administratively, they belong to the Qikiqtaaluk Region of Nunavut, Canada.

The hamlet of Sanikiluaq, where the majority of the inhabitants of the Belcher Islands live, is on the north coast of Flaherty Island and is the southernmost in Nunavut. Along with Flaherty Island, the other large islands are Kugong Island, Tukarak Island, and Innetalling Island. Other main islands in the 1,500-island archipelago are Moore Island, Wiegand Island, Split Island, Snape Island, and Mavor Island, while island groups include the Sleeper Islands, King George Islands, and Bakers Dozen Islands.

== History ==
The archaeological evidence present on the islands indicates that they were inhabited by the Dorset culture between 500 BCE and 1000 CE. Centuries later, from 1200 to 1500, the Thule people made their presence on the islands.

The first European to encounter the islands was English sea explorer Henry Hudson, the namesake of Hudson Bay, who sighted the islands in 1610. In 1670, the islands and the entirety of Hudson Bay drainage basin were designated by the English king, Charles II, as Rupert's Land, managed by the Hudson's Bay Company (HBC). The islands are likely named after Captain James Belcher, an HBC employee in the early 18th-century, or after Royal Navy Admiral Sir Edward Belcher (1799–1877).

In the early 19th century, caribou herds which lived on the islands disappeared. In an alternative effort to find warm clothing, the inhabitants of the islands sought the down of eider ducks, seaducks who nest on the island. In 1870, Rupert's Land was ceded to the Northwest Territories.

Before 1914, English-speaking cartographers knew very little about the Belcher Islands, which they showed on maps as specks, much smaller than their true extent. In that year a map showing them, drawn by George Weetaltuk, came into the hands of Robert Flaherty, and cartographers began to represent them more accurately.

Circa 1933, the Hudson's Bay Company opened a fur trade post, which served as an outpost of the Great Whale River post until 1935, when it became a full post. In 1941, a religious movement led by Charley Ouyerack, Peter Sala, and his sister Mina caused the death by blows or exposure of nine persons, an occurrence that came to be known as the Belcher Island Murders. In 1948, the HBC closed its Belcher Islands post.

In 1963, the HBC opened a Northern Store on the Belcher Islands, which was named Sanikiluaq from 1978 on. HBC divested the Northern Stores department in 1987 to The North West Company, which still operates a Northern Store at Sanikiluaq.

In 1999, when Nunavut was separated from Northwest Territories, the Belcher Islands were included within Nunavut, along with most islands in Hudson Bay.

== Geology ==
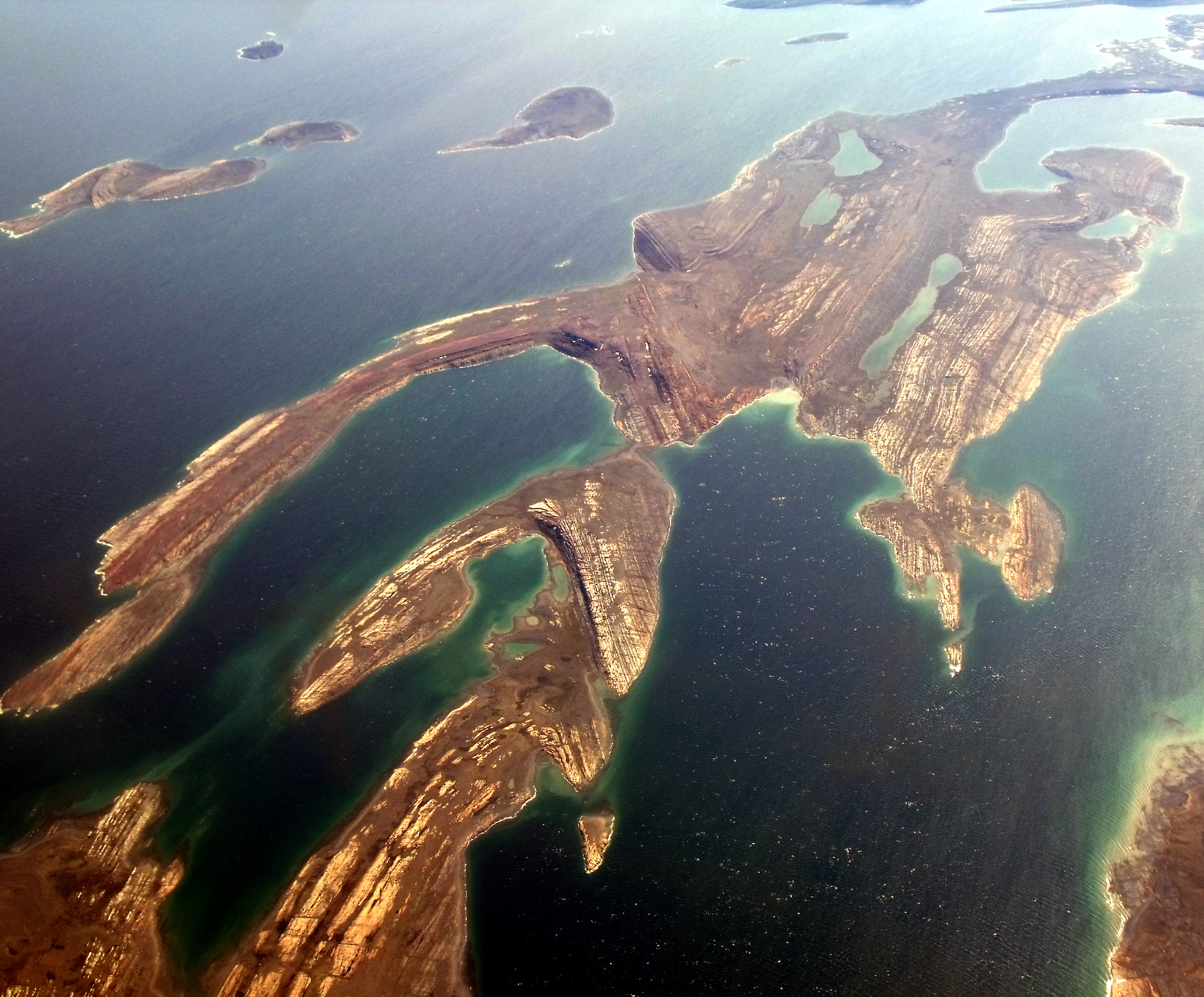
Folded Proterozoic dolomites in the Belcher (Sanikiluaq) Islands

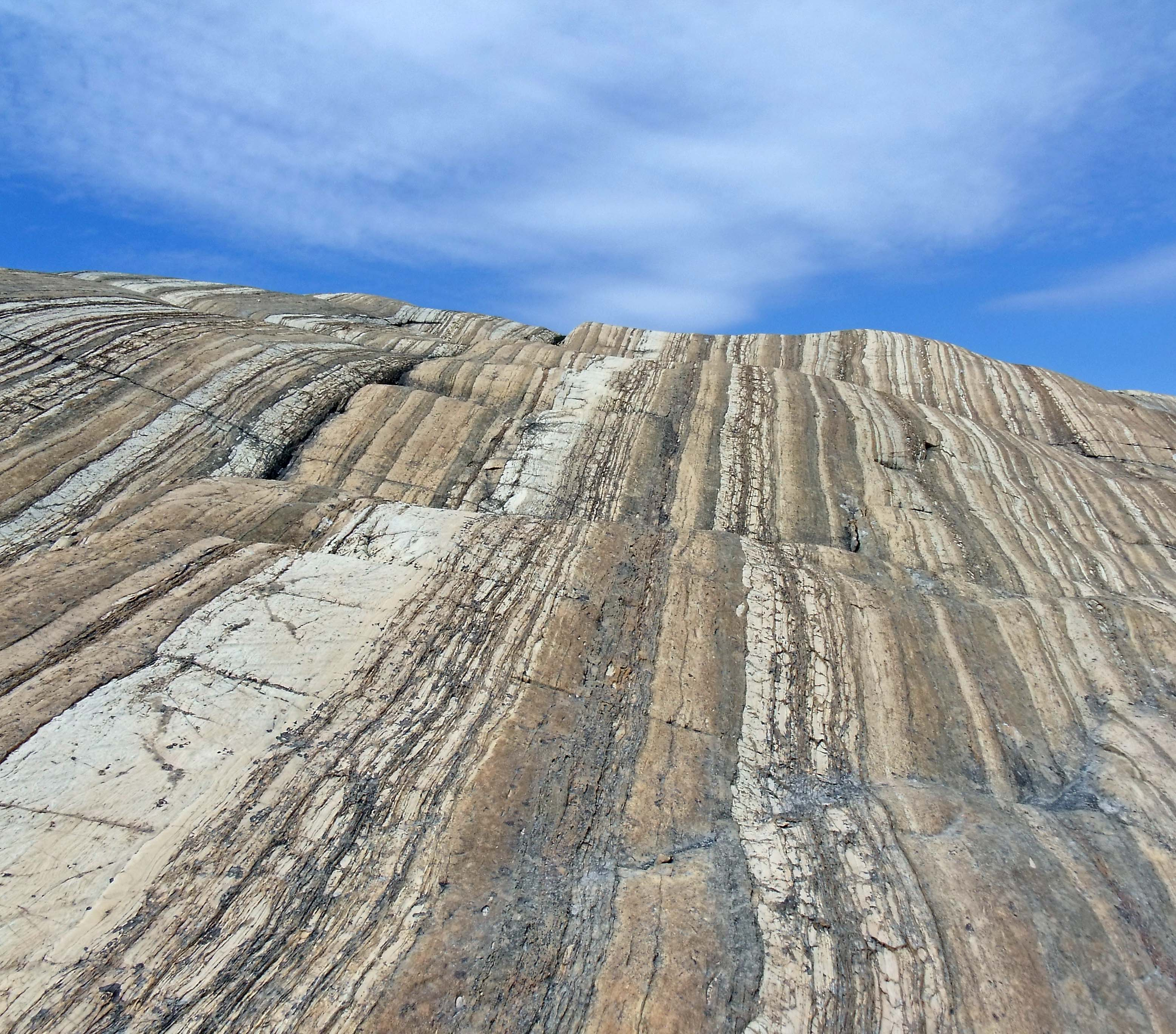
Thin-bedded Proterozoic sedimentary rocks near Sanikiluaq hamlet. These rocks are about 2 billion years old. The width of the bottom of the photo is about 5 metres.

=== General geology ===
The geologic units of the Belcher Group, which forms the Belcher Islands, were deposited during the Paleoproterozoic. Combined with other Paleoproterozoic units that occur along the edge of the Superior Craton, the Belcher Group forms part of the Circum-Superior Belt.

From youngest to oldest, the Belcher Group is composed of:

- Loaf Formation (molasse)
- Omarolluk Formation (flysch)
- Flaherty Formation (flood basalt)
- Kipalu Formation (iron formation)
- Mukpollo Formation (sandstone)
- Rowatt Formation (shallow water carbonate)
- Laddie Formation (deep marine red bed)
- Costello Formation (carbonate slope deposit)
- Mavor Formation (stromatolite reef complex)
- Tukarak Formation (shallow water carbonate)
- Fairweather Formation (shallow water carbonate)
- Eskimo Formation (flood basalt)
- Kasegalik Formation (sabkha)

The oldest part of the Belcher Group, the Kasegalik Formation, was deposited between 2.0185 and 2.0154 billion years ago. The Kasegalik Formation also contains the oldest unambiguous Cyanobacteria microfossils. Much of the Belcher Group strata were deposited under intertidal to shallow-water conditions, although the Mavor Formation formed a platform margin stromatolite reef complex, and the overlying Costello and Laddie formations represent slope and deep basin deposits, respectively. The Kipalu Formation, deposited approximately 1.88 billion years ago, is notable for being a granular iron formation. The Flaherty Formation basalt that composes much of the Belcher Islands was deposited between 1.87 and 1.854 billion years ago, with the overlying Omarolluk and Loaf formations being deposited from 1.854 billion years ago until sometime after 1.83 billion years ago.

=== Soapstone ===
The occurrence of very high-quality soapstone in the Belcher Islands supports a locally significant carving industry. These soapstone occurrences formed when sedimentary rocks of the Belcher Group were intruded by Haig sills and dykes approximately 1.87 billion years ago. Most soapstone is quarried from a site on western Tukarak Island where dolomite of the Costello Formation was intruded by hot magma, with dolomite reacting with quartz and water under intense heat to form talc, calcite, and carbon dioxide:

3CaMg(CO_{3})_{2} + 4SiO_{2} + H_{2}O → [Heat] Mg_{3}Si_{4}O_{10}(OH)_{2} + 3CaCO_{3} + 3CO_{2}

Other minerals within the soapstone are largely calcite, dolomite, talc, and clinochlore, with minor amounts of ilmenite.

Although most soapstone has been sourced from two quarries, the relatively widespread occurrence of Haig intrusions within the Belcher Islands suggests that there may be many more possible sources of high-quality soapstone not yet discovered.

== Flora ==
Several species of willow (Salix) form a large component of the native small shrubbery on the archipelago. These include rock willow (Salix vestita), bog willow (S. pedicellaris), and Labrador willow (S. argyrocarpa), as well as naturally occurring hybrids between S. arctica and S. glauca. Trees cannot grow on the islands because of a lack of adequate soil.

== Fauna ==
The main wildlife consists of belugas, walrus, caribou, common eiders and snowy owls all of which can be seen on the island year round. There is also a wide variety of fish that can be caught such as Arctic char, cod, capelin, lump fish, and sculpin. The historical relationship between the Sanikiluaq community and the eider is the subject of a feature-length Canadian documentary film called People of a Feather. The director, cinematographer and biologist Joel Heath, spent seven years on the project, writing biological articles on the eider.

In 1998, the Belcher Island caribou (Rangifer tarandus groenlandicus) herd numbered 800.
