= Tukarak Island =

Island in Nunavut, Canada

- Location in Nunavut

Geography
- Location: Hudson Bay
- Coordinates: 56°15′N 78°45′W
- Archipelago: Belcher Islands; Arctic Archipelago
- Area: 349 km^{2} (135 sq mi)
- Coastline: 174 km (108.1 mi)

Administration
- Canada
- Territory: Nunavut
- Region: Qikiqtaaluk

Demographics
- Population: Uninhabited
- Source: Sea Islands at Atlas of Canada

Tukarak Island is an uninhabited island in Qikiqtaaluk Region, Nunavut, Canada. Located in Hudson Bay, it is a member of the Belcher Islands group. Along with Flaherty Island, Innetalling Island, and Kugong Island, it is one of the four large islands in the group.

It is dotted with several lakes, one of which is also called Tukarak. Flaherty Island faces it across Omarolluk Sound all along its western side. It is bounded by Fairweather Sound on its south side. Other islands in the immediate vicinity include Bradbury Island, Dove Island, Karlay Island, and Nero Island.
