= Jason Iqaluq =

Canadian politician

Jason Iqaluq MLA

Member of the Legislative Assembly of Nunavut for Hudson Bay
- Incumbent
- Assumed office September 28, 2026
- Preceded by: Daniel Qavvik

Personal details
- Party: Independent (Consensus government)

Jason Iqaluq MLA is a Canadian politician who was elected to the Legislative Assembly of Nunavut in a by-election following the resignation of this predecessor, Daniel Qavvik. Iqaluq represents Hudson Bay and is a native of Sanikiluaq, where he has lived his entire life and works at the Sanikiluaq Airport.
