= Kugong Island =

Island in Nunavut, Canada

- Location within Nunavut Location within Canada

Geography
- Location: Hudson Bay
- Coordinates: 56°20′N 079°50′W
- Archipelago: Belcher Islands; Arctic Archipelago
- Area: 321 km^{2} (124 sq mi)
- Length: 54 km (33.6 mi)
- Coastline: 184 km (114.3 mi)

Administration
- Canada
- Territory: Nunavut
- Region: Qikiqtaaluk

Demographics
- Population: Uninhabited
- Source: Sea Islands at Atlas of Canada

Kugong Island is an uninhabited island in Qikiqtaaluk Region, Nunavut, Canada. Located in Hudson Bay, it is the westernmost member of the Belcher Islands group. Along with Flaherty Island, Innetalling Island, and Tukarak Island, it is one of the four large islands in the group. Kugong Island and Flaherty Island are separated by the Churchill Sound.

== Fauna ==
Arctic hare are common on the island.
