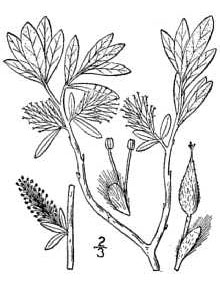

Conservation status
- Secure (NatureServe)

Scientific classification
- Kingdom: Plantae
- Clade: Tracheophytes
- Clade: Angiosperms
- Clade: Eudicots
- Clade: Rosids
- Order: Malpighiales
- Family: Salicaceae
- Genus: Salix
- Species: S. argyrocarpa

Binomial name
- Salix argyrocarpa Andersson

Synonyms
- Salix argyrocarpa denudata Andersson; Salix argyrocarpa var. glabrior Andersson; Salix argyrocarpa sericea (Andersson) Andersson; Salix argyrocarpa var. sericea Andersson; Salix fusca Hook.; Salix repens Pursh

= Salix argyrocarpa =

Species of willow

Salix argyrocarpa is a species of willow native to northeastern North America.

== Description ==
Salix argyrocarpa grows as a shrub and can sometimes form clones by layering. The branches are red to brown in color with little to no hair. The leaves generally lack functioning stipules and are narrow and elliptic, oblong, or oblanceolate in shape, measuring 25–65 by 7–15 millimetres (0.98 in–2.56 in × 0.28 in–0.59 in). The catkins flower in June to early August as the leaves emerge, and the capsules measure 2–4 millimetres (0.079–0.157 in).

== Habitat and distribution ==
Salix argyrocarpa grows naturally in Newfoundland and Labrador, Quebec, Nunavut (on the Belcher Islands), Maine, and New Hampshire. It inhabits wet areas, including floodplains, edges of lakes and streams, and snowbeds, as well as subarctic and subalpine habitats. It prefers granitic, sandstone, and limestone soils.

== Hybridization ==
The species hybridizes naturally with Salix herbacea, S. pedicellaris, and S. planifolia.

== Names ==
Common names include Labrador willow and Northern willow. The plant also has several taxonomic synonyms.
