= Qikiqtani School Operations =

Qikiqtani School Operations (QSO) is one of three Regional School Operations (RSO) in Nunavut, headquartered in Pond Inlet. The RSO includes 22 schools, including 5 elementary schools, 2 middle schools and 3 high schools.

The QSO is responsible for operating schools, various staff-related operations, programs and service supervision (under the direction of the Department of Education), relocation, curricula and educational program assistance and working with and supporting local District Education Authorities.

== Schools ==
=== Elementary ===
- Alookie School, Pangnirtung (K–5)
- Nakasuk School, Iqaluit (K–5)
- Joamie Ilinniarvik School, Iqaluit (K-5)
- Nanook Elementary School, Apex, Iqaluit (K–5)
- Nuiyak School, Sanikiluaq (K–6)
- Ulaajuk School, Pond Inlet (K–5)

=== Middle ===
- Aqsarniit Ilinniarvik School, Iqaluit (6–8)

=== High ===
- Ataguttaaluk High School, Igloolik (8–12)
- Inuksuk High School, Iqaluit (9–12)
- Nasivvik High School, Pond Inlet (6–12)

=== Other ===
- Arnaqjuaq School, Sanirajak (K–12)
- Ataguttaaluk Elementary School, Igloolik (K–7)
- Attagoyuk School, Pangnirtung (6–12)
- Inuksuit School, Qikiqtarjuaq (K–12)
- Inuujaq School, Arctic Bay (K–12)
- Paatsaali School, Sanikiluaq (7–12)
- Peter Pitseolak School, Kinngait (8–12)
- Qaqqalik School, Kimmirut (K–12)
- Qarmartalik School, Resolute (K–12)
- Quluaq School, Clyde River (K–12)
- Sam Pudlat School, Kinngait (K–7)
- Umimmak School, Grise Fiord (K–12)
