= Tuugaalik High School =

- ᑑᒑᓕᒃ ᑎᓪᓕᕐᒃ ᐃᓕᓐᓂᐊᕐᕕᒃ

Location
- Naujaat, Nunavut; Canada; 66.533491°N 86.247119°W

Information
- Type: High School
- Established: 9 September 2016
- Authority: Kivalliq School Operations
- Grades: 7 to 12
- Enrollment: 155 (2017/18)
- Area: 32,582 ft^{2}

Tuugaalik High School is a grade 7–12 school in the hamlet of Naujaat, which is located on the Arctic Circle in the Kivalliq Region of Nunavut, northern Canada. The school building was completed in August 2016 and the official opening was on 9 September 2016. The school has received a number of awards for its innovative provision of educational facilities in this remote Arctic community.

== Design and construction ==
Tuugaalik High School was designed by Parkin Architects Ltd and constructed by Accutech Engineering Inc and AGE Engineering. Construction of the 32,582 ft^{2} building was completed in August 2016 at a cost of $26 million.

=== Design ===
Schools in the Canadian Arctic are designed not only to accommodate the education of children but also to play a role as public spaces and cultural resources within the community. The design of Tuugaalik High School was influenced by Inuit Qaujimajatuqangit (IQ) guidelines that encompass respect, being open and welcoming, community service, consensus building, resourcefulness and caring for the environment. From the start, the design process was informed by dialogue with members of the community and local officials, and design proposals were presented to them for community approval and consensus.

The agreed design provided a large community gathering space known as a 'Kiva', common in Nunavut schools, providing a welcoming space where elders could be invited to come and share their traditional knowledge with the students. As well as standard classrooms, the design included a science room, library, gymnasium and weightlifting room, plus specialist rooms to provide for practical subjects such as woodworking, carving, welding, engine repair, sewing, cooking and fur preparation. The facilities also included on-site daycare and a special needs washroom. The building design used bold colours representing the Arctic springtime and incorporated natural light, bringing a positive atmosphere within the school, aiming to reduce truancy by creating an environment that students would be excited to attend.

=== Construction ===
In spring 2015, the site was prepared by blasting the exposed rock of the hillside. Building materials were shipped by barge during summer 2015 and the building was erected and enclosed before the winter. The structural design elevated the building envelope above ground level to protect the permafrost and to prevent snow from drifting around the building facades, a technique common in Arctic construction. Work continued on the building interior through the winter, and the exterior was completed in spring and summer 2016, ready for the autumn term.

== Operation ==
Naujaat had a population of 1082 in 2016 and the school enrolled 152 students for the 2016–7 academic year. The school year runs from mid-August through to the beginning of June, with vacations at Christmas and Easter, plus a week off in February for teacher professional development. An increase in attendance levels has been reported since the school opened, and attendance for 2016–7 was 71.8%, which is above the average for Kivalliq high schools for that year.

In addition to the curriculum, the school also aims to arrange a number of day-long land trips by Ski-Doo and qamutiik towards the end of May each year. These are built into the curriculum for grades 7–9 and enable students and teachers to work together in a different environment. In addition, the school engages with traditional activities, celebrating heritage and culture days, serving traditional dishes, inviting elders as guests into the school and organising an elder tea.

The school has worked to build a cultural exchange with Laidlaw School in Winnipeg; after initial contact in 2019, there were plans to proceed in spring 2020, but COVID-19 has disrupted this. All schools in Nunavut were closed from 17 April 2020 to the end of the school year because of the global COVID-19 pandemic.

In May 2021, Tuugaalik High School was one of eight Nunavut schools that will receive a grant of up to $15,000 from the music education charity MusiCounts to buy the school's choice of new musical instruments.

== Awards ==
The school has been featured in a number of publications and received awards:

- 2017 Honorable Mention Award for Excellence in Educational Facility Design
- 2017 Outstanding Design, American School & University Educational
- 2017 Special Citation, American School & University
- 2017 Honorable Mention Award for Excellence in Educational Facility Design

== See also ==
- Education in Canada
- List of schools in Nunavut
