= École des Trois-Soleils =

Location
- 2802 Niaqunngusiariaq; Iqaluit, Nunavut, X0A 2H0; Canada; 63°44′25″N 068°28′48″W

Information
- School type: Public/French School
- Founded: 2001
- School board: Commission scolaire francophone du Nunavut
- Principal: Nadine Petnkeu
- Grades: K to 12
- Enrollment: 112
- Language: French
- Colours: white, blue and yellow

École des Trois-Soleils (Three Suns School) is the only French language school located in Iqaluit, Nunavut and offers classes from Grades K to 12. The school was founded in 2001 and opened in 2002 for classes.

The school is located next to Aqsarniit Ilinniarvik School and Arctic Winter Games Complex.
