= Allan Rumbolt =

Canadian politician

Allan Rumbolt MLA

Member of the Legislative Assembly of Nunavut for Hudson Bay
- In office October 27, 2008 – September 20, 2021
- Preceded by: Peter Kattuk
- Succeeded by: Daniel Qavvik

Personal details
- Born: 1966 or 1967 (age 58–59) Little Catalina, Newfoundland and Labrador
- Party: non-partisan consensus government

Allan Rumbolt is a Canadian politician, who was elected as the Member of the Legislative Assembly for the electoral district of Hudson Bay in the Legislative Assembly of Nunavut in the 2008 territorial election. He was re-elected in 2013 and 2017

== Early life ==
Allan Rumbolt was born in Little Catalina, Newfoundland and Labrador in 1966.

== Career ==
In 1987, Rumbolt moved to Nunavut (then the Northwest Territories) to work for The North West Company, and worked in several communities there until 1990, when he settled in Sanikiluaq with the Company. After leaving the Company, he was employed as the Qammaq Housing Association manager. Following this, he furthered his education by taking courses to become qualified in operating heavy equipment, and prior to his election as a member of the Nunavut Legislative Assembly, worked as a heavy equipment operator with the Municipality of Sanikiluaq.

In Sanikiluaq, Rumbolt has served for two years on the municipal council, as well as serving for the same length of time with the local District Education Authority. In 2008, he was elected as the Member of the Legislative Assembly of Nunavut for the electoral district of Hudson Bay as part of the territorial election. He ran on a promise to "listen to the people and organizations of Sanikiluaq, and do what he can to achieve the community's goals." Rumbolt wanted to address local issues concerning recreation, hunting, the environment and roads. Out of 338 votes, he won 152, or 45.0%, for a plurality of the votes. his closest competitor, Johnny Manning, won 121 votes, with 35.8% of the vote.
