= Hudson Bay (Nunavut electoral district) =

Territorial electoral district in Nunavut, Canada

Nunavut electoral district
- Boundaries of Hudson Bay
- Coordinates: 56°32′34″N 079°13′30″W

Territorial electoral district
- Legislature: Legislative Assembly of Nunavut
MLA
Jason Iqaluq
- District created: 1999
- First contested: 1999
- Last contested: 2025

Hudson Bay (Inuktitut: ᑕᓯᐅᔭᕐᔪᐊᕐᒃ, French: Baie d’Hudson, Inuinnaqtun: Tahiuyaryuaq) is a territorial electoral district (riding) for the Legislative Assembly of Nunavut, Canada. The riding consists of the community of Sanikiluaq.

The seat is currently represented by Jason Iqaluq, who was elected in a by-election following the resignation of the previous Member of the Legislative Assembly, Daniel Qavvik.

== Members of the Legislative Assembly ==
Parliament	Years	Member
1st	1999–2004	Peter Kattuk
2nd	2004–2008	Peter Kattuk
3rd	2008–2013	Allan Rumbolt
4th	2013–2017	Allan Rumbolt
5th	2017–2021	Allan Rumbolt
6th	2021–2025	Daniel Qavvik
7th	2025–2026	Daniel Qavvik
7th	2026–present	Jason Iqaluq

== Election results ==
=== 2026 by-election ===
Nunavut territorial by-election, September 28, 2026
Candidate	Votes	%
Jason Iqaluq	168	75.7
Nukaja Sala	54	24.3
Eligible voters		469
Total valid ballots		222
Rejected ballots		6
Turnout		48.6%

=== 2025 election ===
2025 Nunavut general election
Candidate	Votes	%
Daniel Qavvik	Acclaimed	

=== 2021 election ===
2021 Nunavut general election
Candidate	Votes	%
Daniel Qavvik	227	70.7
Mick Appaqaq	86	26.8
Ronald Ladd	8	2.5
Eligible voters		479
Total valid ballots		321
Rejected ballots		3
Turnout		67.0%

=== 2017 election ===
2017 Nunavut general election
Candidate	Votes	%
Allan Rumbolt	131	37.6
Peter Qavvik	112	32.2
Peter Kattuk	105	30.2
Eligible voters		462
Total valid ballots		348
Rejected ballots		2
Turnout		75.3%

=== 2013 election ===
2013 Nunavut general election
Candidate	Votes	%
Allan Rumbolt	139	44.3
Moses Appaqaq	97	30.9
Frank Audla	63	20.1
Lucy Uppik	15	4.8
Eligible voters		412
Total valid ballots		314
Rejected ballots		8
Turnout		76.1%

=== 2008 election ===
2008 Nunavut general election
Candidate	Votes	%
Allan Rumbolt	152	43.4
Johnny Manning	121	36.2
Bill Fraser	65	20.4
Eligible voters		414
Total valid ballots		338
Rejected ballots		0
Turnout		81.6%

=== 2004 election ===
2004 Nunavut general election
Candidate	Votes	%
Peter Kattuk	127	42.76
Moses Appaqaq	92	30.98
Jonny Tookalook	30	10.10
Kupapik Ningeocheak	29	9.76
Joe Arragutainaq	19	6.40
Eligible voters		307
Total valid ballots		297
Rejected ballots		2
Turnout		97.39%

=== 1999 election ===
1999 Nunavut general election
Candidate	Votes	%
Peter Kattuk	165	60.89
Moses Appaqaq	106	39.11
Eligible voters		343
Total valid ballots		271
Rejected ballots		0
Turnout		79.01%

== See also ==
- List of Nunavut territorial electoral districts
- Canadian provincial electoral districts
