= Daniel Qavvik =

Canadian politician

Member of the Legislative Assembly of Nunavut for Hudson Bay
- In office November 19, 2021 – June 1, 2026
- Preceded by: Allan Rumbolt
- Succeeded by: Jason Iqaluq

Personal details
- Born: 1989 (age 36–37) Churchill, Manitoba
- Party: Independent (Consensus government)
- Occupation: Conservation officer

Daniel Qavvik is a Canadian Inuk politician who was elected to the Legislative Assembly of Nunavut in the 2021 Nunavut general election, representing the electoral district of Hudson Bay. Qavvik was born in Churchill, Manitoba but has lived almost all of his life in Sanikiluaq, where he worked as a conservation officer until 2021.

Qavvik served as Nunavut's environment minister until his resignation from the Executive Council of Nunavut on November 20, 2024 following his arrest on charges of assault and assault by choking from an incident on November 13. He continued to serve in the Legislative Assembly until June 1, 2026, when he resigned, triggering a by-election to elect his replacement on September 28, 2026.
