= Commission scolaire francophone du Nunavut =

School district in Nunavut, Canada

Commission scolaire francophone du Nunavut (CSFN) is the French-language school board in Nunavut, headquartered in Iqaluit. The board operates the École des Trois-Soleils.
