= Quluaq School =

Coordinates: 70.4736°N 68.5880°W

Location
- Clyde River, Nunavut, Canada

Information
- Grades: K-12

Quluaq School in Clyde River, Nunavut, is a full school from kindergarten through grade 12. It serves a community of 1100 people and a school under the Qikiqtani School Operations.
