= Kiilinik High School =

High school in Cambridge Bay, Nunavut, Canada

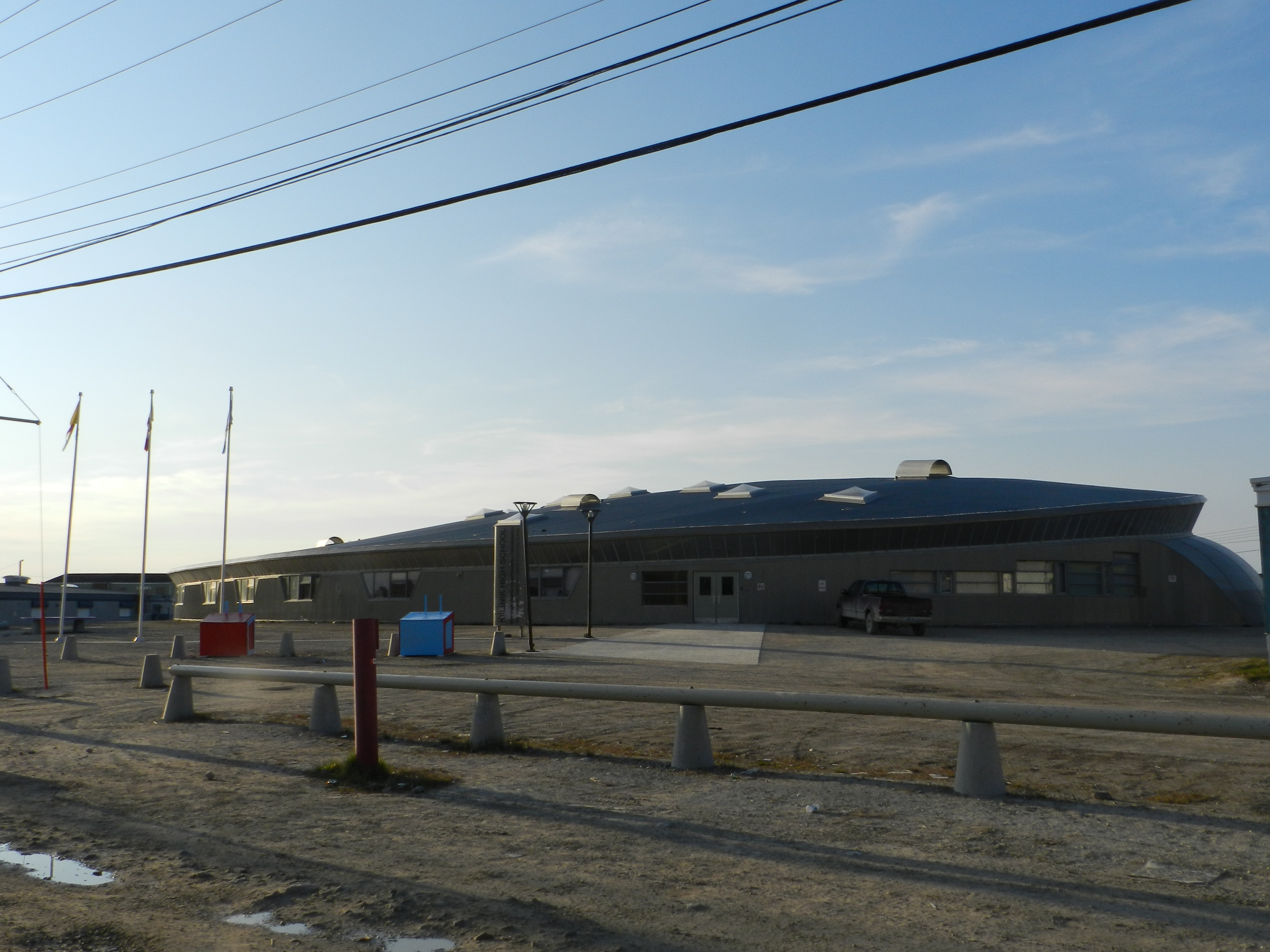

Location
- 23 Omingmak Street, Cambridge Bay, Nunavut, X0B 0C0; Canada
- Coordinates: 69°07′06″N 105°03′18″W

Information
- School board: Ikaluktutiak District Education Authority
- School district: Kitikmeot School Operations
- Superintendent: Albert Trask
- Chair: Alan Sim
- Director: Catherine Keeling
- Principal: Cale Duffus
- Teaching staff: 10
- Employees: 15
- Grades: 7 - 12
- Enrollment: 200+
- Language: Inuinnaqtun and English
- Mascot: Wolverines
- Team name: Kiilinik Wolverines

Kiilinik High School is a grades 7 to 12 school located in Cambridge Bay, Nunavut, Canada. The school serves not only the community but also those of Bathurst Inlet and Umingmaktok should the need arise. At one time a hostel was available for Bathurst Inlet area students but due to families moving to Cambridge Bay it was repurposed.

Cambridge Bay is the regional centre for the Kitikmeot and has a large Nunavut Arctic College presence. The college attracts student from throughout the region and Nunavut as whole, some of whom bring their children who also attend the high school.

The current building was opened in 2002 after the previous building was destroyed in a fire in 1998.

The school proper includes a community gym for which $70,000 was raised to ensure a full-sized facility was built. The school library also includes the May Hakongak Public Library and Kitikmeot Heritage Society museum and office area.
