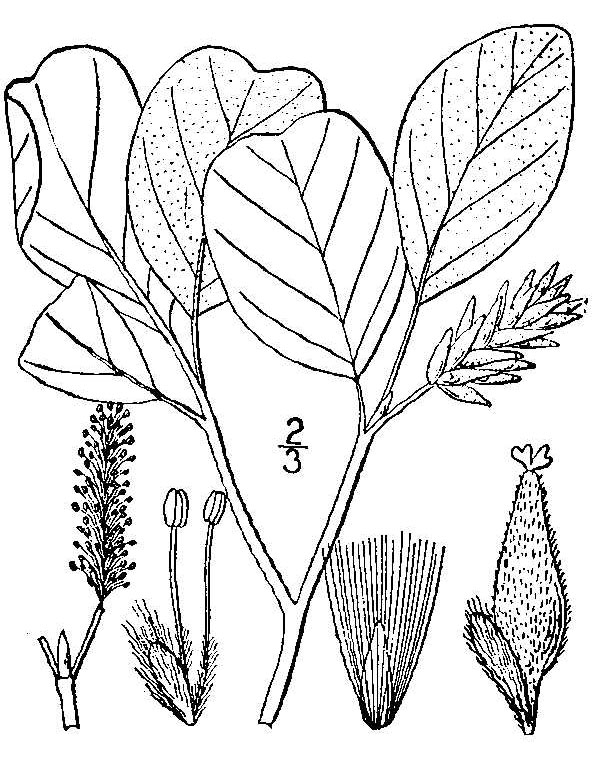

Scientific classification
- Kingdom: Plantae
- Clade: Tracheophytes
- Clade: Angiosperms
- Clade: Eudicots
- Clade: Rosids
- Order: Malpighiales
- Family: Salicaceae
- Genus: Salix
- Species: S. vestita

Binomial name
- Salix vestita Pursh

= Salix vestita =

Shrub in the genus of willows

Salix vestita, the rock willow, is a small shrub in the willow genus (Salix).

== Range ==
Salix vestita is an ancient species, found on both sides of the Bering Strait. Its distribution includes a series of isolated, disjunct populations in Central Siberia, the northern Rocky Mountains, the west coast of Hudson Bay, and the northeastern arctic and subarctic. Occurrence in Nunavut is on Akpatok Island in Ungava Bay and on the Belcher Islands in Hudson Bay. It may be extirpated in Washington.
