= People of a Feather =

- Film poster
- Directed by: Joel Heath
- Written by: Joel Heath; Dinah Kavik; Johnny Kudluarok
- Produced by: Joel Heath
- Cinematography: Joel Heath
- Edited by: Jocelyne Chaput; Evan Warner
- Distributed by: First Run Features
- Release date: May 5, 2011 (Hot Docs)
- Running time: 90 minutes
- Country: Canada
- Languages: English; Inuktitut

People of a Feather is a Canadian documentary film, directed by Joel Heath and released in 2011. The film explores the impact of the development of hydroelectric dam projects in the Canadian Arctic on the population of eider ducks at Sanikiluaq, Nunavut.

== Awards ==
The film received a Canadian Screen Award nomination at the 2nd Canadian Screen Awards, for Best Feature Length Documentary.
