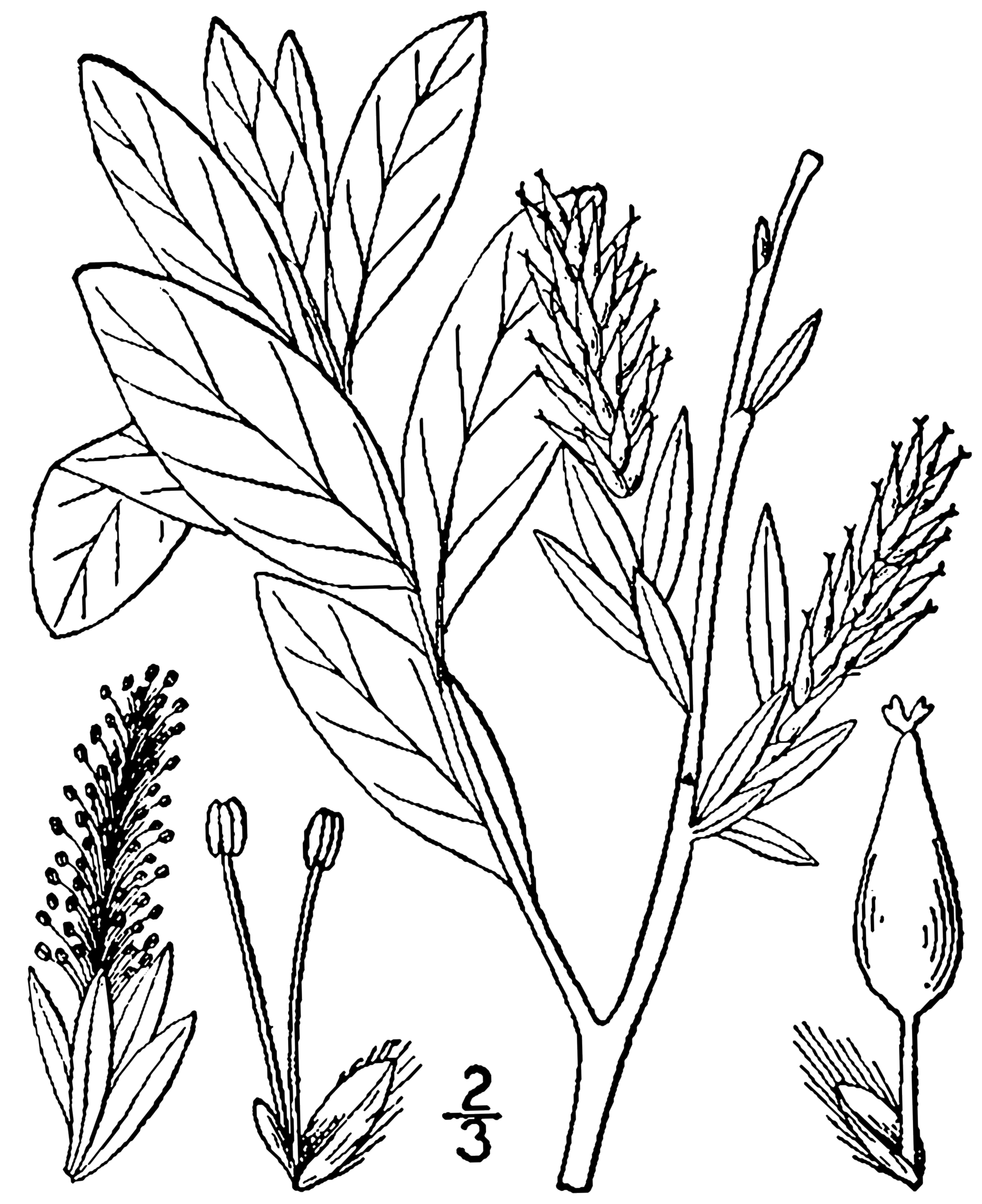
- Botanical illustration

Conservation status
- Least Concern (IUCN 3.1)

Scientific classification
- Kingdom: Plantae
- Clade: Tracheophytes
- Clade: Angiosperms
- Clade: Eudicots
- Clade: Rosids
- Order: Malpighiales
- Family: Salicaceae
- Genus: Salix
- Species: S. pedicellaris

Binomial name
- Salix pedicellaris Pursh

= Salix pedicellaris =

Species of shrub

Salix pedicellaris, the bog willow, is a species of willow. It grows as a shrub.

== Conservation status in the United States ==
It is listed as endangered in Connecticut by state authorities. It is also listed as endangered in New Jersey, Ohio, and Pennsylvania. It is listed as threatened in Iowa, and is listed as "historical" in Rhode Island.

== Photographs ==
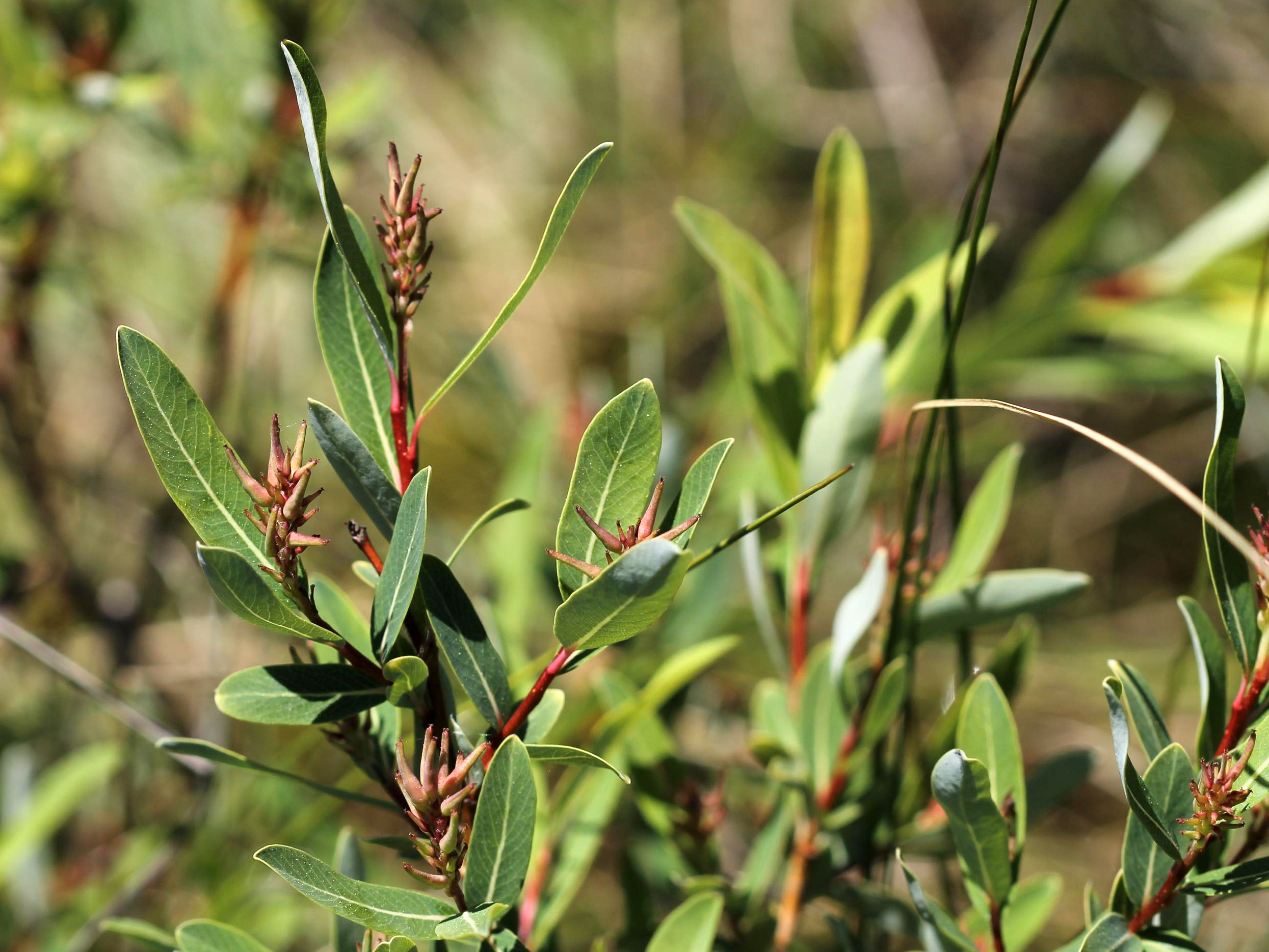

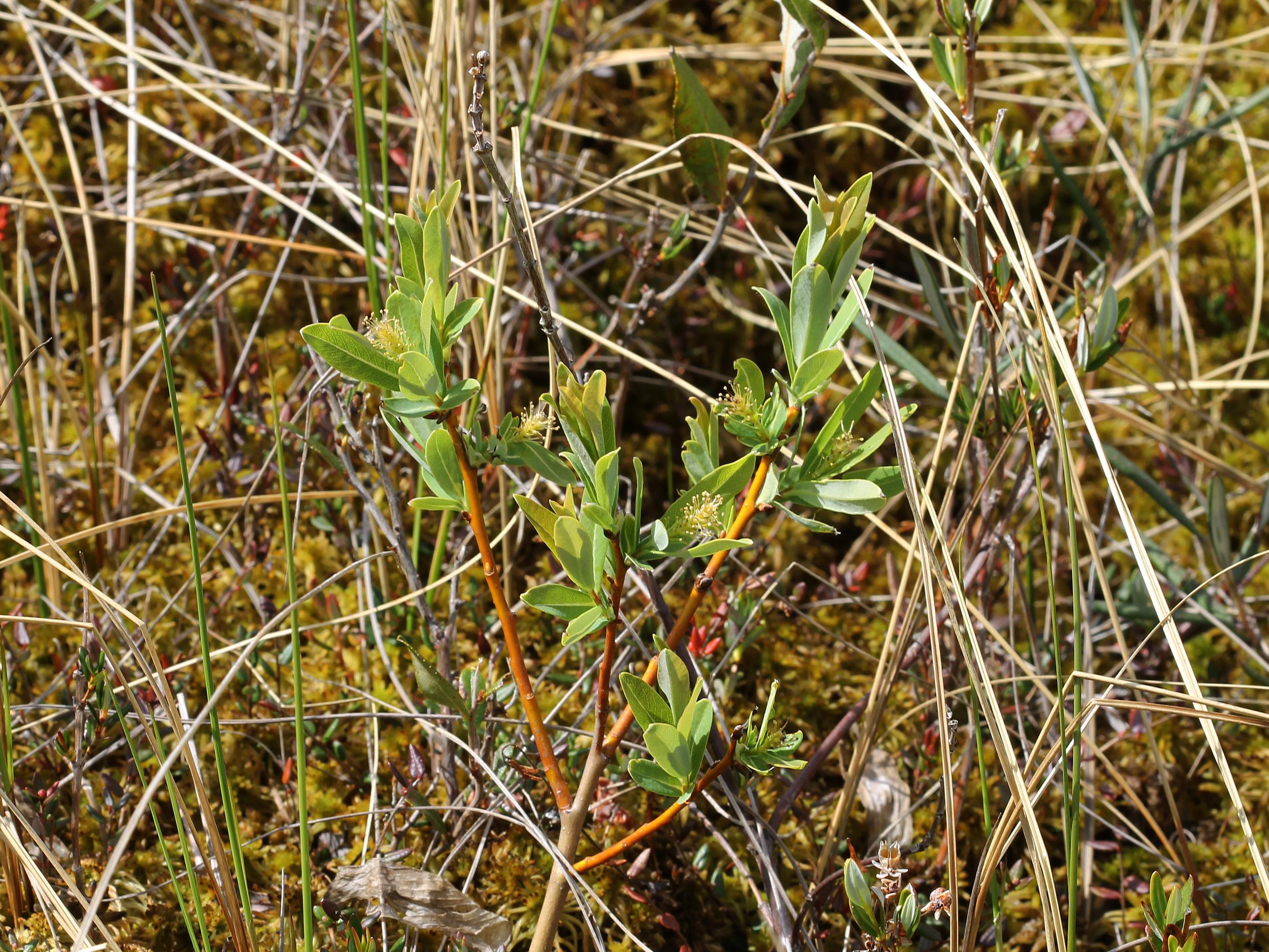

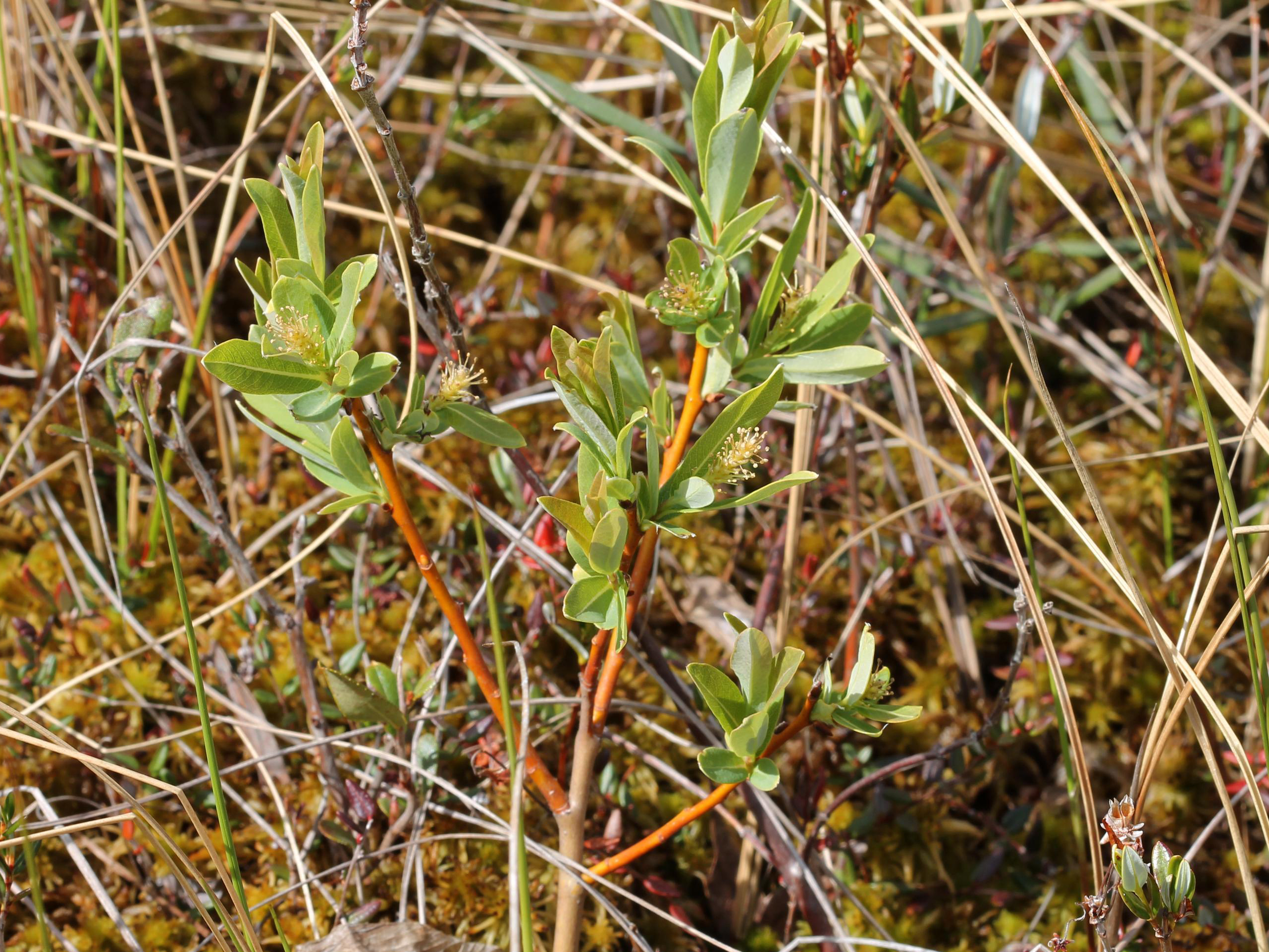

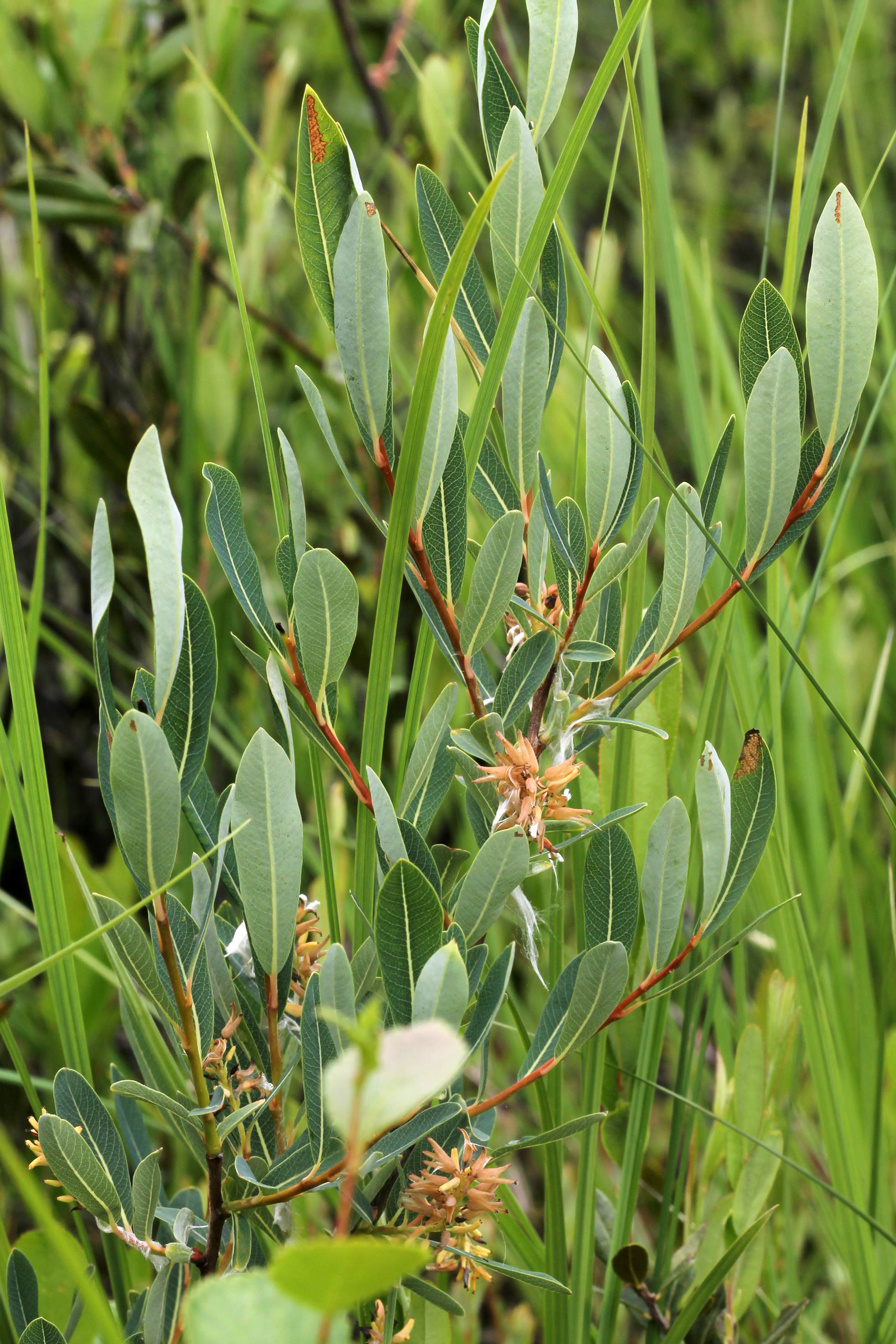

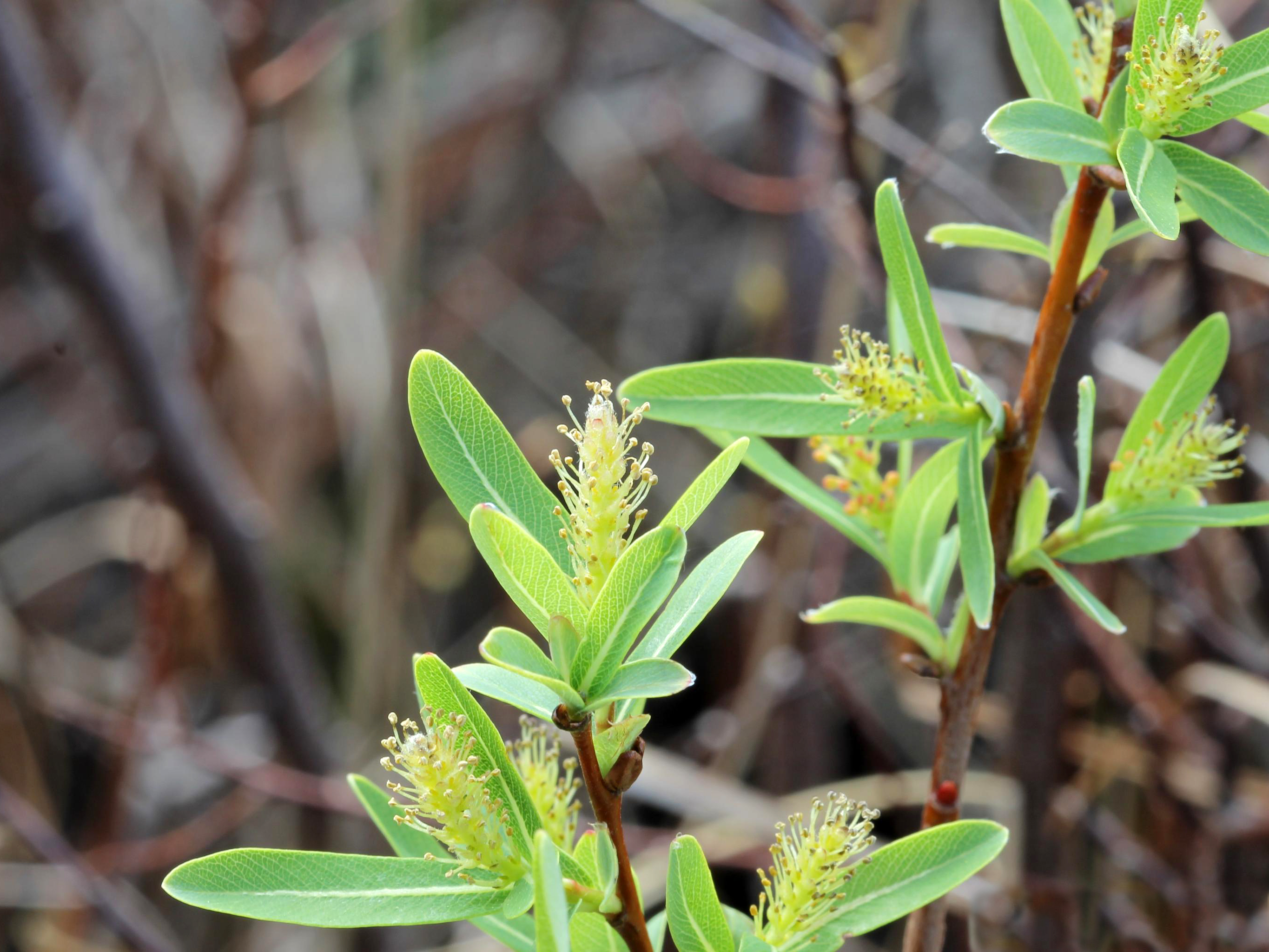

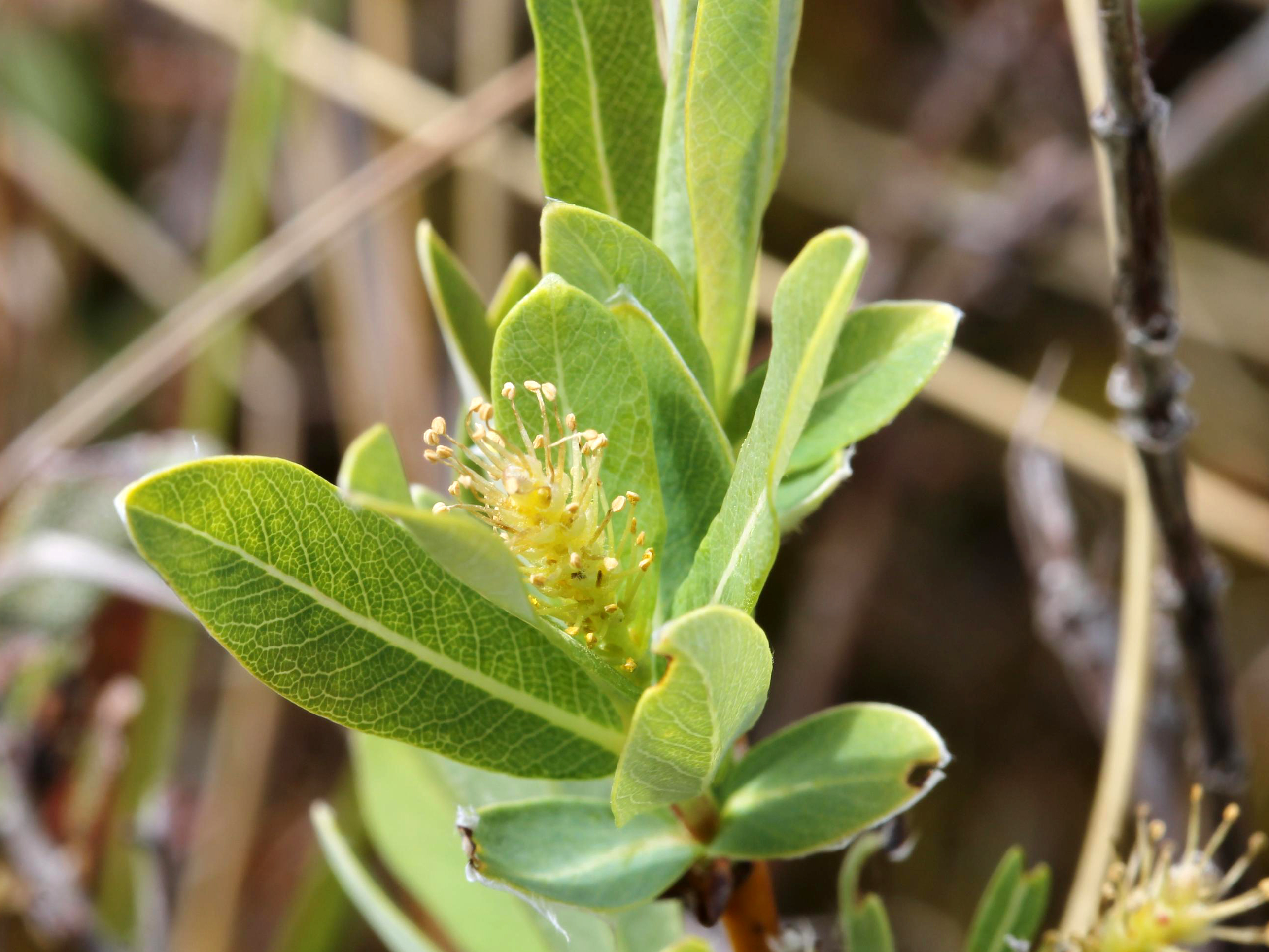

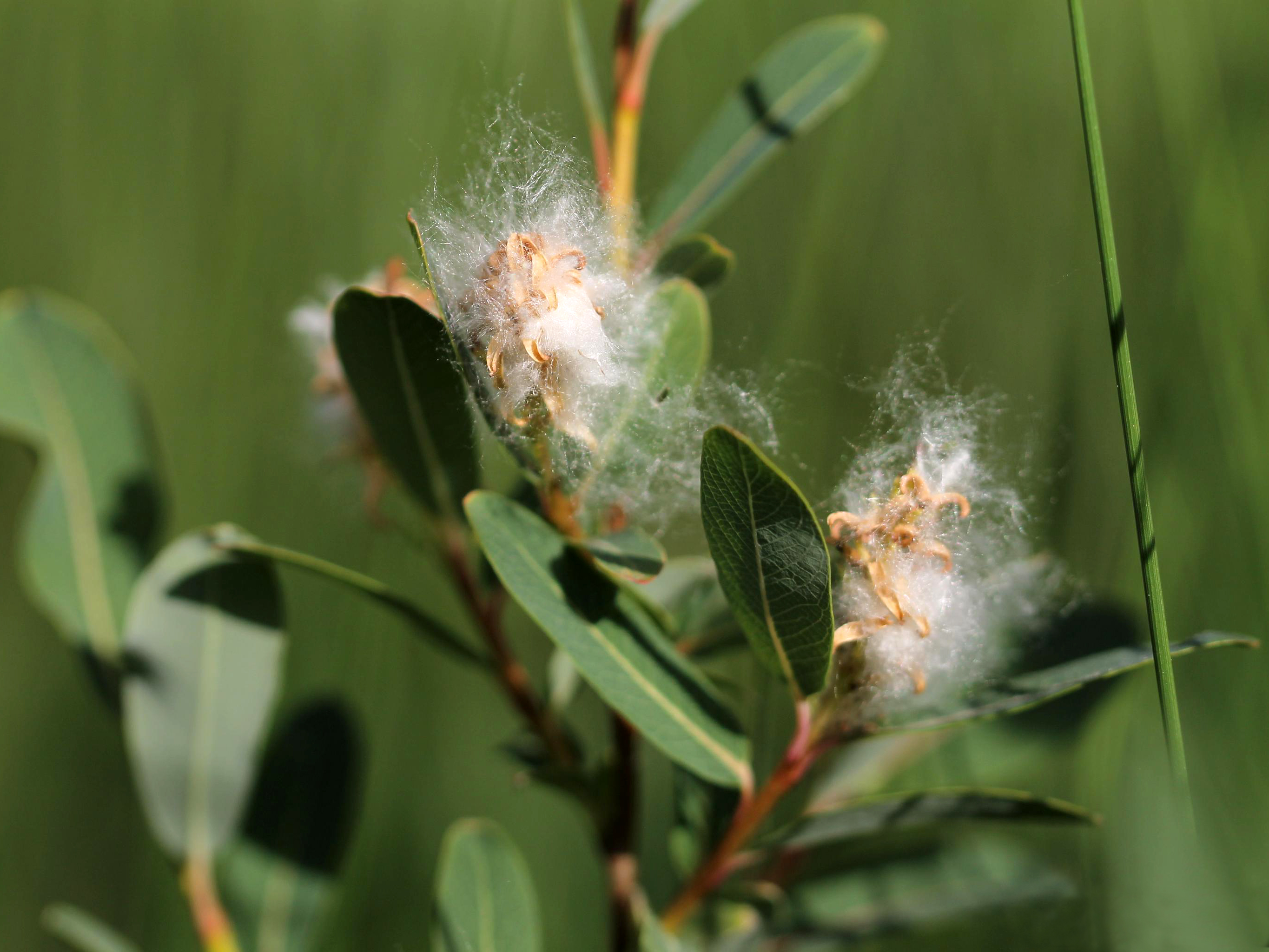
