= Innetalling Island =

Island in Nunavut, Canada

- Location within Nunavut Location within Canada

Geography
- Location: Hudson Bay
- Coordinates: 55°56′N 79°00′W
- Archipelago: Belcher Islands; Arctic Archipelago
- Length: 35 km (21.7 mi)

Administration
- Canada
- Territory: Nunavut
- Region: Qikiqtaaluk

Demographics
- Population: Uninhabited
- Source: Innetalling Island at Atlas of Canada

Innetalling Island is an uninhabited island in Qikiqtaaluk Region, Nunavut, Canada. Located in Hudson Bay's Omarolluk Sound, it is a member of the Belcher Islands group. It runs from Fairweather Sound at its northern end to Ridge Passage at its southern one. Fairweather Harbour is located on the north end of the island's east side.

Other islands in the immediate vicinity include Walton Island, Johnnys Island, Mavor Island, and La Duke Island.
