= Paatsaali School =

Location
- Box 219; Sanikiluaq, Nunavut, X0A 0W0; Canada; 56°32′24″N 79°13′44″W

Information
- Founded: 2011
- School board: Qikiqtani School Operations
- Superintendent: Trudy Pettigrew (ED)
- School number: 32
- Principal: Tim Hoyt
- Grades: 7 to 12
- Enrollment: approx. 177 (September, 2017)
- Language: Inuktitut and English
- Colours: Blue and Grey
- Mascot: Qajaq
- Website: www.paatsaali.ca/index.html

Paatsaali School is a high school in Sanikiluaq, Nunavut, Canada. Paatsaali School opened in 2011 and has 177 students.

Next door to the school is Nuiyak School, an elementary school with 126 students from kindergarten to grade six.
