= Flaherty Island =

Island in Nunavut, Canada

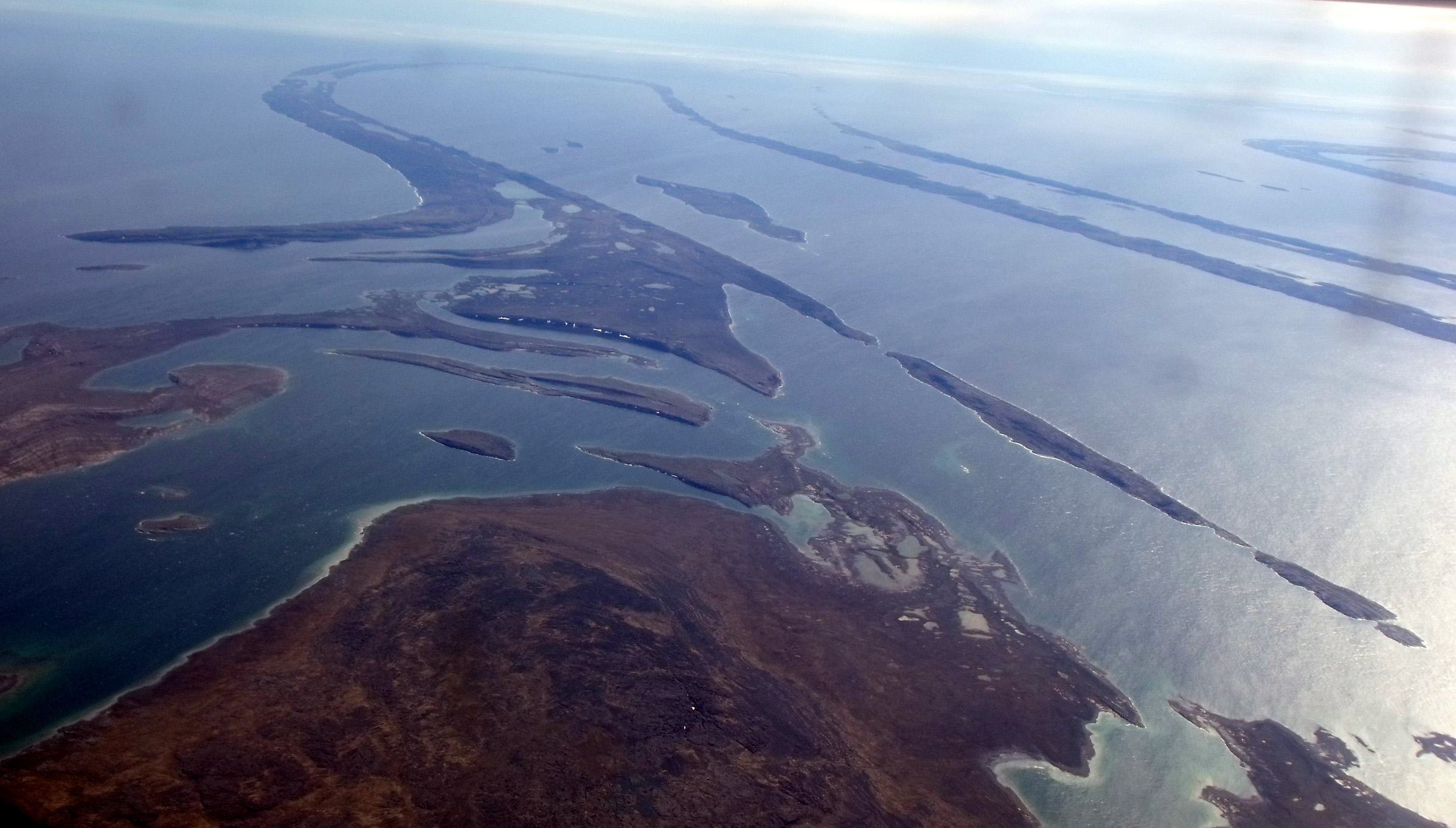
- Flaherty Island from the air, looking south.

- Location within Nunavut Location within Canada

Geography
- Location: Hudson Bay
- Coordinates: 56°14′N 079°17′W
- Archipelago: Belcher Islands; Arctic Archipelago
- Area: 1,861.56 km^{2} (718.75 sq mi) (2026)
- Area rank: 36th in Canada & 219th worldwide
- Length: 7.1 km (4.41 mi)
- Width: 4.2 km (2.61 mi)
- Highest elevation: 34 m (112 ft)

Administration
- Canada
- Territory: Nunavut
- Region: Qikiqtaaluk
- Largest settlement: Sanikiluaq

Demographics
- Population: 1,010 (2021)
- Ethnic groups: Inuit

Flaherty Island is the largest island of the Belcher Islands group in Hudson Bay in Qikiqtaaluk Region, Nunavut, Canada. The Inuit community of Sanikiluaq is located on its north coast, and is the southernmost community in Nunavut. The island is named in honour of visual anthropologist Robert J. Flaherty. With an area of 1,861.56 km^{2} (718.75 sq mi) it is the 36th largest island in Canada and 219th worldwide.
