= Sanikiluaq =

Municipality in Nunavut, Canada

Sanikiluaq ᓴᓂᑭᓗᐊᖅ
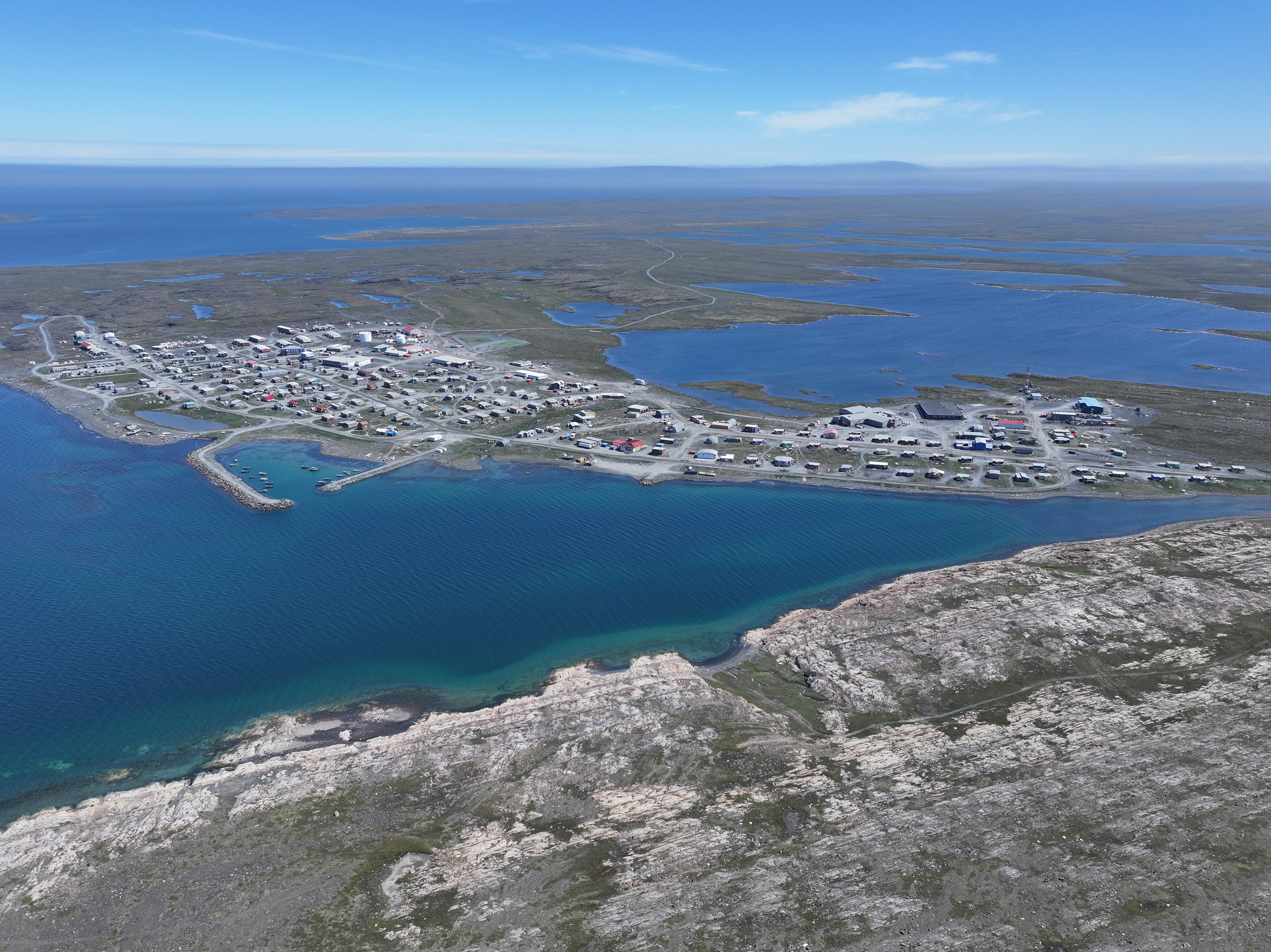
- Sanikiluaq in July, 2026

- Seal

- Location within Nunavut Location within Canada
- Coordinates: 56°32′N 079°14′W
- Country: Canada
- Territory: Nunavut
- Region: Qikiqtaaluk
- Electoral district: Hudson Bay

Government
  - Type: Hamlet Council
  - Mayor: Johnnie Cookie
  - MLA: Daniel Qavvik

Area (2021)
  - Total: 109.68 km^{2} (42.35 sq mi)
- Elevation: 32 m (105 ft)

Population (2021)
  - Total: 1,010
  - Density: 9.2/km^{2} (24/sq mi)
- Time zone: UTC−05:00 (EST)
  - Summer (DST): UTC−04:00 (EDT)
- Canadian Postal code: X0A 0W0
- Area code: 867
- Website: www.sanikiluaq.ca

Sanikiluaq (Inuktitut: ᓴᓂᑭᓗᐊᖅ [sanikiluaq]) is a municipality and Inuit community located on the north coast of Flaherty Island in Hudson Bay, on the Belcher Islands. Despite being geographically much closer to the shores of Ontario and Quebec, the community and the Belcher Islands lie within the Qikiqtaaluk Region of Nunavut, Canada.

== History ==
The community was developed in the early 1970s to replace "South Camp", located further south in the island group. To the north of the town is Kinngaaluk Territorial Park, a 3,300 acres (1,300 ha) space designed for camping, cultural expression, and seasonal hunting. The park contains archaeological remains deposited by the Dorset and Thule cultures. The park was formally designated as such by the Nunavut legislature in 2019. The master plan for the park, drawn up by NVision Insight Group, won an award from the Canadian Society of Landscape Architects in 2019.

== Demographics ==
Federal census population history of Sanikiluaq
Year	Pop.	±%
1971	235	—
1976	300	+27.7%
1981	383	+27.7%
1986	422	+10.2%
1991	526	+24.6%
1996	631	+20.0%
2001	684	+8.4%
2006	744	+8.8%
2011	812	+9.1%
2016	882	+8.6%
2021	1,010	+14.5%
Source: Statistics Canada

In the 2021 Canadian census conducted by Statistics Canada, Sanikiluaq had a population of 1,010 living in 228 of its 252 total private dwellings, a change of 14.5% from its 2016 population of 882. With a land area of 109.68 km^{2} (42.35 sq mi), it had a population density of 9.2/km^{2} (23.9/sq mi) in 2021.

== Economic development ==
Sanikiluaq had an eider down factory for 20 years. It closed down in 2005 due to government funding running out and the population of eider ducks decreasing at a rapid rate. The factory reopened in June 2015.

== Transportation ==
It is the southernmost community in the territory, and is served by the Sanikiluaq Airport. Air service is provided by Air Inuit, Calm Air and Panorama Aviation.

== Education ==
There are two schools in the community, Nuiyak School, with 11 teaching staff, teaches grades K-6, with 125 students enrolled. Paatsaali School has 177 students and teaches grades 7–12. In 2007, former principal Lisi Kavik was named one of Canada's Outstanding Principals.

== Broadband communications ==
The community has been served by the Qiniq network since 2005. Qiniq is a fixed wireless service to homes and businesses, connecting to the outside world via a satellite backbone. The Qiniq network is designed and operated by SSi Canada. In 2017, the network was upgraded to 4G LTE technology, and 2G-GSM for mobile voice.

== Government ==
The community is in the Hudson Bay electoral district and Daniel Qavvik is the member of the Legislative Assembly of Nunavut. He replaced long time incumbent, Allan Rumbolt, in the 2021 Nunavut general election.

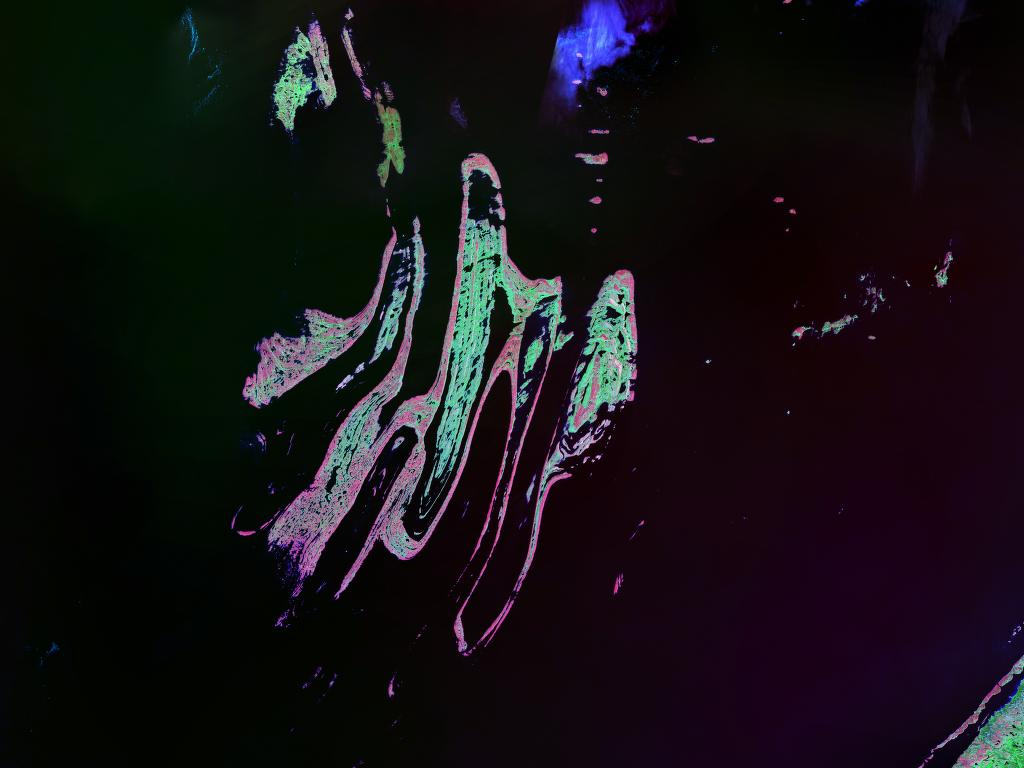
Landsat satellite photo of Belcher Islands

In the territorial election held October 25, 2021, the candidates were Mick Appaqaq, Ronald Ladd, and Daniel Qavvik. Allan Rumbolt who had represented the riding since the 2008 Nunavut general election did not run. Qavvik won with 227 votes (70.1%) over Appaqaq with 86 (26.5%) and Ladd with 8 (2.5%).

The local municipality has a Hamlet Council of eight elected councillors and a mayor. At the last hamlet election, held October 28, 2019, Johnnie Cookie was re-elected mayor with 191 (67.5%) over Jonasie Emikotailuk with 21 (7.4%), votes, and Elijassie Kavik with 69 (24.4%) votes.

Sanikiluaq federal election results
Year	Liberal		Conservative		New Democratic		Green	
2021	30%	77	30%	75	40%	101	0%	0
2019	27%	62	19%	44	52%	118	1%	2

== Revival of basket making ==
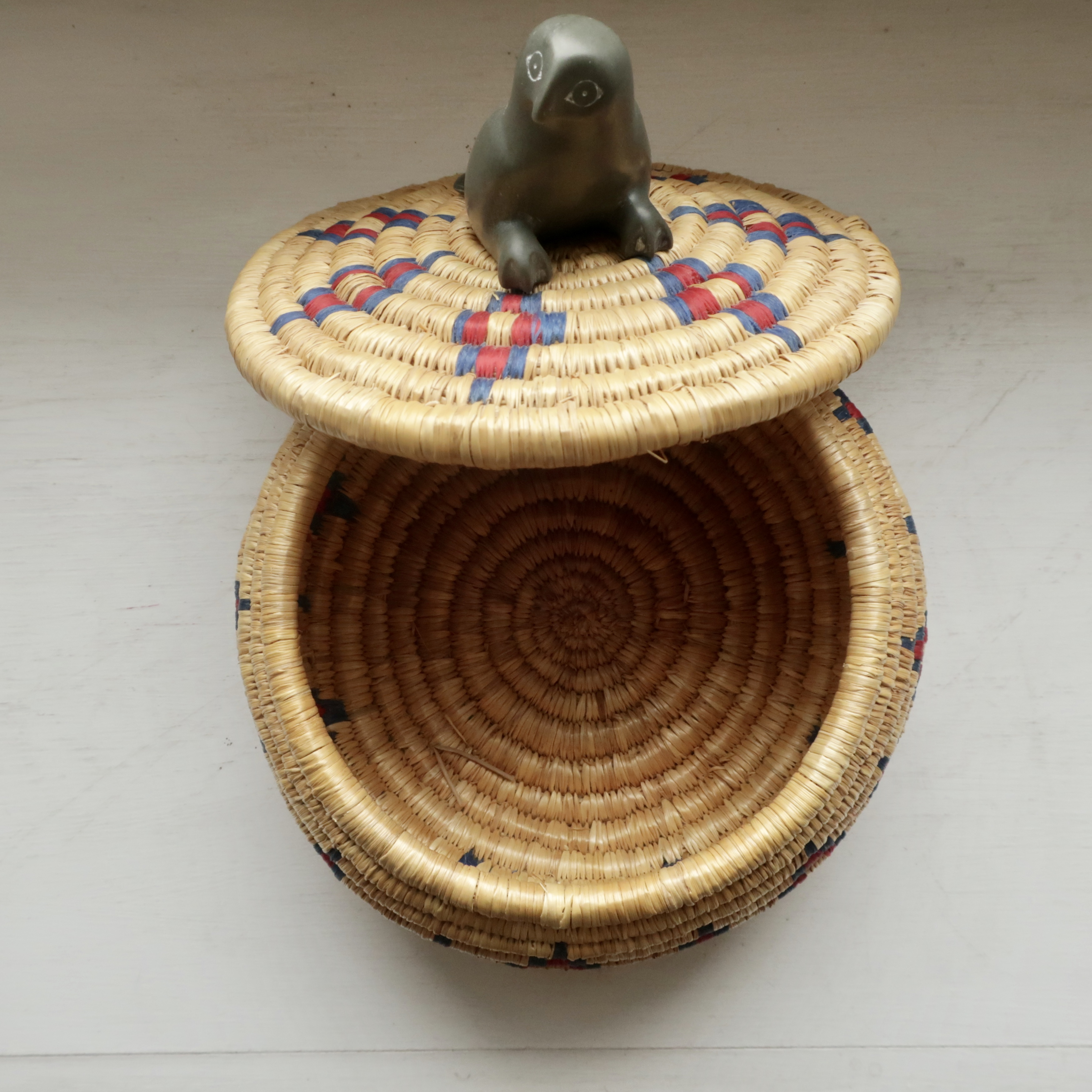
Lyme grass basket made in Sanikiluaq in 2009

In 1996, Nunavut Arctic College began a project in Sanikiluaq, to revive the art of sewing baskets, qisiq, from ivigag or lyme grass (Leymus mollis), which is common along the shorelines of Hudson Bay. Traditional grass baskets made by the Sanikiluaqmiut, residents of Sanikiluaq, are finely crafted, and are unique: they have lids and handles often carved from soapstone, and it "can take weeks to make just one grapefruit-sized basket".

The baskets are of great significance to the community, because of the complexity of the sewing and coiling techniques used, but there were no remaining experienced basket-makers practising the art. Therefore, community members came together to revive the art of traditional Sanikiluaq basketry, consulting Elders for their advice and knowledge, as well as using photographs and descriptions from the Canadian Museum of History (then the Museum of Civilization) in Ottawa, and relying on their collective cultural memory and extant skills.

== Film ==
Written and directed by Joel Heath, with support from the community of Sanikiluaq, People of a Feather is a documentary film about the relationship between climate change, hydroelectric dams, eider ducks and the people of the Belcher Islands.

== See also ==
- List of municipalities in Nunavut
- Moses Appaqaq
