= Devolution =

Granting of some competences of central government to local government

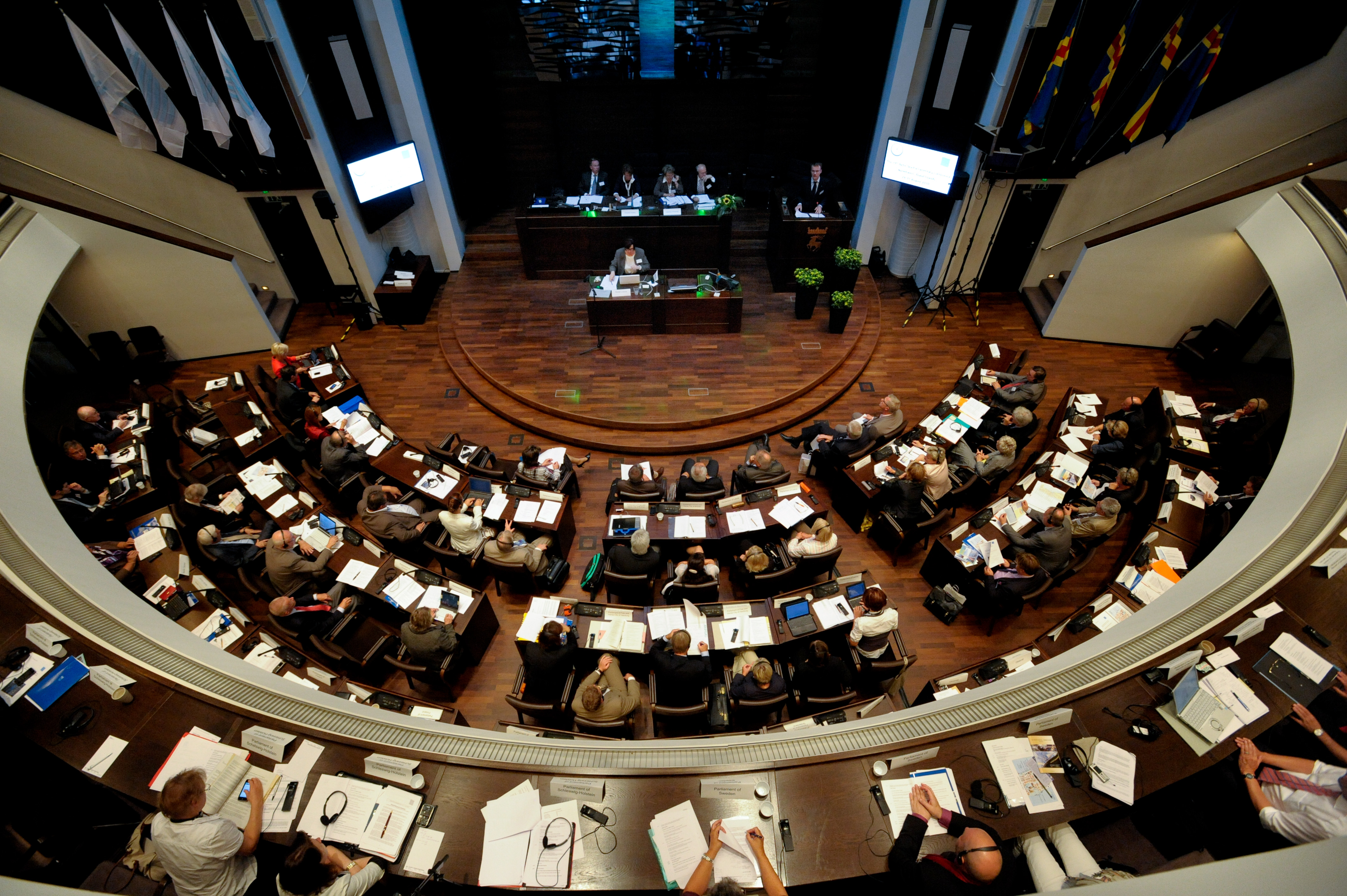
The Parliament of Åland

Devolution is the statutory delegation of powers from the central government of a sovereign state to govern at a subnational level, such as a regional or local level. It is a form of administrative decentralization. Devolved territories have the power to make legislation relevant to the area, thus granting them a higher level of autonomy.

Devolution differs from federalism in that the devolved powers of the subnational authority may be temporary and are reversible, ultimately residing with the central government. Thus, the state remains de jure unitary. Legislation creating devolved parliaments or assemblies can be repealed or amended by central government in the same way as any statute. In federal systems, by contrast, sub-unit government is guaranteed in the constitution, so the powers of the sub-units cannot be withdrawn unilaterally by the central government (i.e., not without the process of constitutional amendment). The sub-units therefore have a lower degree of protection under devolution than under federalism.

== By country ==
=== Australia ===
Australia is a federation. It has six states and two territories with less power than states.

The Australian Capital Territory refused self-government in a 1978 referendum, but was given limited self-government by a House of Assembly from 1979, and a Legislative Assembly with wider powers in 1988.

The Northern Territory refused statehood in a 1998 referendum. The rejection was a surprise to both the Australian and Northern Territory governments.

Territory legislation can be disallowed by the Commonwealth Parliament in Canberra, with one notable example being the NT's short-lived voluntary euthanasia legislation.

=== Canada ===
Although Canada is a federal state, a large portion of its land mass in the north is under the legislative jurisdiction of the federal government (called territories, as opposed to provinces). This has been the case since 1870. In 1870 the Deed of Surrender or 'Rupert's Land and North-Western Territory Order' effected the admission of Rupert's Land and the North-Western Territory to Canada, pursuant to section 146 of the Constitution Act, 1867 and the Rupert's Land Act 1868. The Manitoba Act, 1870, which created Manitoba out of part of Rupert's Land, also designated the remainder of both the Northwest Territories (NWT), over which Parliament was to exercise full legislative authority under the Constitution Act, 1871.

Yukon was carved from the Northwest Territories in 1898 but remained a territory. In 1905, the provinces of Alberta and Saskatchewan were carved from the Northwest Territories. Portions of Rupert's Land were added to the provinces of Ontario and Quebec, extending those provinces northward from their previous narrow band around the St. Lawrence and lower Great Lakes. The District of Ungava was a regional administrative district of Canada's Northwest Territories from 1895 to 1912. The continental areas of said district were transferred by the Parliament of Canada with the adoption of the Quebec Boundary Extension Act, 1898 and the Quebec Boundaries Extension Act, 1912. The status of the interior of Labrador that was believed part of Ungava was settled in 1927 by the British Judicial Committee of the Privy Council, which ruled in favour of the Dominion of Newfoundland. The offshore islands to the west and north of Quebec remained part of the Northwest Territories which was transformed into Nunavut in 1999.

Since the 1970s, the federal government has been transferring its regional decision-making powers to territorial governments. This means greater local control and accountability by northerners for decisions central to the future of the territories. In 1999, the federal government created Nunavut pursuant to a land claim agreement reached with Inuit, the indigenous people of Canada's Arctic. Since that time, the federal government has slowly devolved legislative jurisdiction to the territories. Enabling the territories to become more self-sufficient and prosperous and to play a stronger role in the Canadian federation is considered a key component to development in Canada's North. Among the three territories, devolution is most advanced in Yukon.

On June 18, 2021, Nunatsiavut, the Inuit self-government in Labrador, stated that it had begun the process of seeking devolution of child protection services from the Newfoundland and Labrador Department of Children, Seniors and Social Development with the goal for negotiations to conclude within three years.

==== Northwest Territories ====
The Northwest Territories (NWT) was governed from Ottawa from 1870 until the 1970s, except for the brief period between 1898 and 1905 when it was governed by an elected assembly. The Carrothers Commission was established in April 1963 by the government of Lester B. Pearson to examine the development of government in the NWT. It conducted surveys of opinion in the NWT in 1965 and 1966 and reported in 1966. Major recommendations included that the seat of government should be located in the territory. Yellowknife was selected as the territorial capital as a result. Transfer of many responsibilities from the federal government was recommended and carried out. This included responsibility for education, small business, public works, social services and local government. Since the report, the government of the Northwest Territories has taken over responsibilities for several other programs and services including the delivery of health care, social services, education, administration of airports, and forestry management. The legislative jurisdiction of the territorial legislature is set out in section 16 of the Northwest Territories Act.

Now, the government of Canada is negotiating the transfer of the Crown–Indigenous Relations and Northern Affairs Canada's remaining provincial-type responsibilities in the NWT. These include the legislative powers, programs and responsibilities for land and resources associated with the department's Northern Affairs Program (NAP) with respect to:

- Powers to develop, conserve, manage, and regulate of surface and subsurface natural resources in the NWT for mining and minerals (including oil and gas) administration, water management, land management and environmental management;
- Powers to control and administer public land with the right to use, sell or otherwise dispose of such land; and
- Powers to levy and collect resource royalties and other revenues from natural resources.

The Government of the Northwest Territories, the Aboriginal Summit and the Government of Canada have each appointed a Chief Negotiator to work on devolution. A Framework Agreement was concluded in 2004. The target date for the completion of devolution talks for the NWT was March 2007. However, stumbling blocks associated with the transfer of current federal employees to the territorial government, and the unresolved issue of how much money the Northwest Territories will receive for its resources has delayed the conclusion of a devolution agreement for the NWT.

==== Nunavut ====
In 1963, the federal government established the Carrothers Commission to look at the issue of government in the north. After extensive study and consultation, the Commission concluded that division of the NWT was probably both advisable and inevitable. There was a recognition that Northerners wanted to run their own affairs and must be given the opportunity to do so. At the same time, however, it noted that governmental reform was required before this could happen. It recommended the establishment of a new system of representative government. As a result, in the late 1960s and 1970s, the federal government gradually created electoral constituencies and transferred many federally run programs to the territorial government. Northerners took on more and more responsibility for the day-to-day running of their own affairs. In 1982 a plebiscite was held in the NWT asking the question, "Do you think the NWT should be divided?" Of the eligible voters 53 percent participated in the plebiscite, with 56.4 percent of them voting "yes". Voter turnout and support for division was particularly strong in the Eastern Arctic. The Inuit population of the eastern section of the territory had become increasingly receptive of the idea of self-government. It was viewed as the best way to promote and protect their culture and traditions and address their unique regional concerns.

Both the NWT Legislative Assembly and the federal government accepted the idea of dividing the territory. The idea was viewed as an important step towards enabling the Inuit, and other residents of the Central and Eastern Arctic, to take charge of their own destiny. There were some reservations, however. Before action could be taken, certain practical considerations had to be addressed. First of all, outstanding land claims had to be settled. Second, all parties had to agree on a new boundary. Finally, all parties had to agree on the division of powers between territorial, regional and local levels of government. The various governments and native groups worked closely together to realize these goals. The Nunavut Land Claims Agreement was ratified by the Inuit in November 1992, signed by the Prime Minister of Canada on May 25, 1993, and passed by the Canadian Parliament in June of the same year. It was the largest native land claim settlement in Canadian history. It gave the Inuit title over 350,000 km^{2} (140,000 sq mi). It also gave the Inuit capital transfers from the federal government of over $1.1 billion over the next 14 years. This money will be held in trust with the interest to be used in a variety of different projects, including financing for regional businesses and scholarships for students. The Inuit also gained a share of resource royalties, hunting rights and a greater role in managing the land and protecting the environment. The land claims agreement also committed the Government of Canada to recommend to Parliament legislation to create a new territory in the eastern part of the Northwest Territories.

While negotiations on a land claims settlement progressed, work was also taking place to determine potential jurisdictional boundaries for a new Eastern Territory. A proposal was presented to all NWT voters in a May 1992 plebiscite. Of those voting, 54 percent supported the proposed boundary. The Government of the Northwest Territories, Nunavut Tunngavik Incorporated (the Inuit claims organization) and the federal government formally adopted the boundary for division in the Nunavut Political Accord. The final piece of the equation fit into place on June 10, 1993, when the Nunavut Act received Royal Assent. It officially established the territory of Nunavut and provided a legal framework for its government. It fixed April 1, 1999, as the day on which the new territory would come into existence.

The government of Nunavut is currently negotiating with the government of Canada on a devolution agreement. Nunavut Tunngavik Incorporated, the organization of Inuit of Nunavut, is also a participant to negotiations to ensure that Inuit interests are represented.

Devolution over natural resources to the government of Nunavut moved forward with the appointment of a Ministerial Representative for Nunavut Devolution. The representative has held meetings with interested parties including the boards established under the Nunavut Land Claims Agreement (NLCA), territorial and federal government departments in order to determine if devolution will occur and if so the future mandate of devolution. The government of Nunavut and Nunavut Tunngavik have appointed negotiators.

==== Yukon ====
In 1896, prospectors discovered gold in Yukon, which prompted a massive gold rush that saw the population of Yukon grow very rapidly. By 1898, Dawson grew into the largest Canadian city west of Winnipeg, with a population of 40,000. In response, the Canadian government officially established the Yukon Territory in 1898. The North-West Mounted Police were sent in to ensure Canadian jurisdiction and the Yukon Act provided for a commissioner to administer the territory. The 1898 statute granted the Commissioner in Council "the same powers to make ordinances... as are possessed by the Lieutenant Governor of the North-west Territories, acting by and with the advice and consent of the Legislative Assembly thereof". In 1908 amendments to the Yukon Act transformed the Council into an elected body.

Over time the territorial government exercised expanded functions. Relevant developments include the following:

- By the mid-1960s, schools, public works, welfare, and various other matters of a local nature had come under territorial administration.
- Increased authority of elected Council members over the ensuing period contributed to significant changes in the Yukon Commissioner's role. In 1979, instructions from the Minister of Indian Affairs and Northern Development (Minister) directed the Commissioner to allow elected members and the Executive Council to make important policy decisions, specifying that his/her actions should normally be based on the advice and taken with the consent of the elected Executive Council.
- As in the Northwest Territories, federal responsibilities were transferred to the Yukon government in the 1980s. In 1988 the Minister and the Yukon Government Leader signed a Memorandum of Understanding committing the parties to smooth the progress of devolution of remaining province-like responsibilities to the Yukon Government. Responsibilities transferred since then include fisheries, mine safety, intra-territorial roads, hospitals and community-health care, oil-and-gas and, most recently, natural resources.
- Discussion to transfer land- and resource-management responsibilities to the Yukon Government began in 1996, followed by a formal federal devolution proposal to the Yukon Government in January 1997. In September 1998 a Devolution Protocol Accord to guide devolution negotiations was signed. On August 28, 2001, a final draft of the Devolution Transfer Agreement was completed for consideration. The Yukon Devolution transfer Agreement was concluded on October 29, 2001, with the Government of Canada enabling the transfer of remaining province-like responsibilities for land, water and resource management to the Government of Yukon on April 1, 2003.

=== France ===
In the late 1980s a process of decentralisation was undertaken by the French government. Initially regions were created and elected regional assemblies set up. Together with the departmental councils these bodies have responsibility for infrastructure spending and maintenance (schools and highways) and certain social spending. They collect revenues through property taxes and various other taxes. In addition a large part of spending is provided by direct grants to such authorities.

There also are groups calling for devolution or full independence for Occitania, the Basque Country, Corsica, Alsace, and Brittany.

=== Mexico ===
==== The Federal District ====
All constituent states of Mexico are fully autonomous and comprise a federation. The Federal District, originally integrated by Mexico City and other municipalities, was created in 1824 to be the capital of the federation. As such, it was governed directly by the central or federal government and the president of Mexico appointed its governor or executive regent. Even though the municipalities within the Federal District were autonomous, their powers were limited. In 1928, these municipalities were abolished and transformed into non-autonomous delegaciones or boroughs and a "Central Department", later renamed as Mexico City. In 1970 this department was split into four new delegaciones, and Mexico City was constitutionally defined to be synonymous and coterminous with the entire Federal District. (As such, the boroughs of the Federal District are boroughs of Mexico City).

In the 1980s, the citizens of the Federal District, being the most populated federal entity in Mexico, began to demand home rule: a devolution of autonomy in order to directly elect their head of government and to set up a Legislative Assembly. In 1987, an Assembly of Representatives was created, by constitutional decree, whose members were elected by popular vote. The devolution of the executive power was not granted until 1997 when the first head of government was elected by popular vote. Finally, in 2000, power was devolved to the delegaciones, though limited: residents can now elect their own "heads of borough government" (jefes delegacionales, in Spanish), but the delegaciones do not have regulatory powers and are not constituted by a board of trustees, like the municipalities of the constituent states.

The autonomy, or home rule, of the Federal District, was granted by the federal government, which in principle has the right to remove it. The president of Mexico still holds the final word in some decisions (e.g. he must approve some posts), and the Congress of the Union reviews the budget of the Federal District and sets the limit to its debt.

Some left-wing groups and political parties have advocated, since the 1980s, for a full devolution of powers by transforming the Federal District into the thirty-second constituent state of the Federation (with the proposed name of "State of the Valley of Mexico", to be distinguished from the state of Mexico; another proposed name is "State of the Anahuac").

==== Indigenous peoples ====
In a recent amendment to the Constitution of Mexico, the country was defined as a "pluricultural nation" founded upon the "indigenous peoples". They are granted "free-determination" to choose the social, economic, cultural and political organization for which they are to elect representatives democratically in whatever manner they see fit, traditionally or otherwise, as long as women have the same opportunities to participate in their social and political life. There are, however, no prescribed limits to their territories, and they are still under the jurisdiction of the municipalities and states in which they are located; the indigenous peoples can elect representatives before the municipal councils. In practice, they are allowed to have an autonomous form of self-government, but they are still subject to the rights and responsibilities set forth by the federal constitution and the constitution of the states in which they are located.

=== Spain ===
The Spanish Constitution of 1978 granted autonomy to the nationalities and regions of which the Kingdom of Spain is composed. (See also autonomous communities and cities of Spain)

Under the "system of autonomies" (Spanish: Estado de las Autonomías), Spain has been quoted to be "remarkable for the extent of the powers peacefully devolved over the past 30 years" and "an extraordinarily decentralised country", with the central government accounting for just 18% of public spending; the regional governments 38%, the local councils 13% and the social-security system the rest.

In 2010, the Constitutional Court ruled that referendums of any kind, defined as measuring the public opinion of all voting citizens (apellatio ad populum) can't be held without government approval.

On December 12, 2013, the Catalan Government announced that a referendum would be held on self-determination. The central government of Spain considers that a binding referendum is unconstitutional and cannot be held. On October 1, 2017, the regional government held a referendum despite having been declared illegal by the Spanish courts. Subsequently, several leaders were arrested and imprisoned on charges of "sedition" and "rebellion". The regional president fled to Brussels, but has so far escaped extradition as those offenses are not part of Belgian law or the European Arrest Warrant. On December 21, 2017, fresh elections were held in which pro-independence parties held a slim majority and a broad coalition of constitutionalist parties expressed disappointment and concern for the future.

=== United Kingdom ===
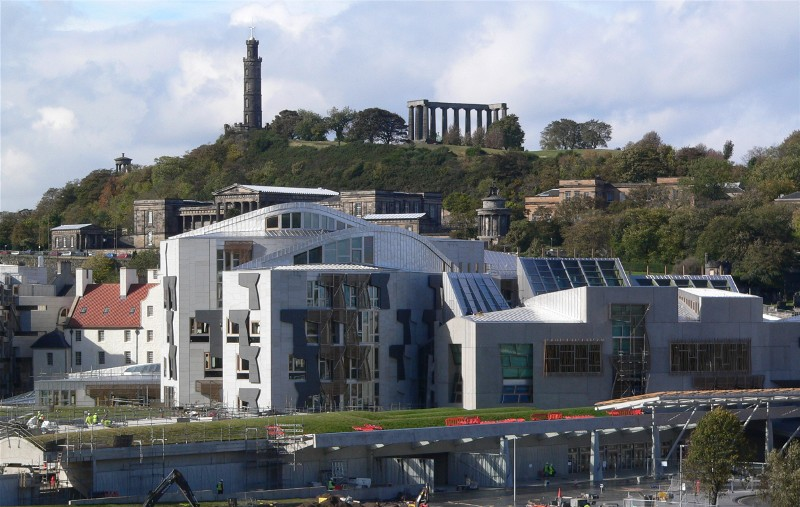
Holyrood (Scottish Parliament)

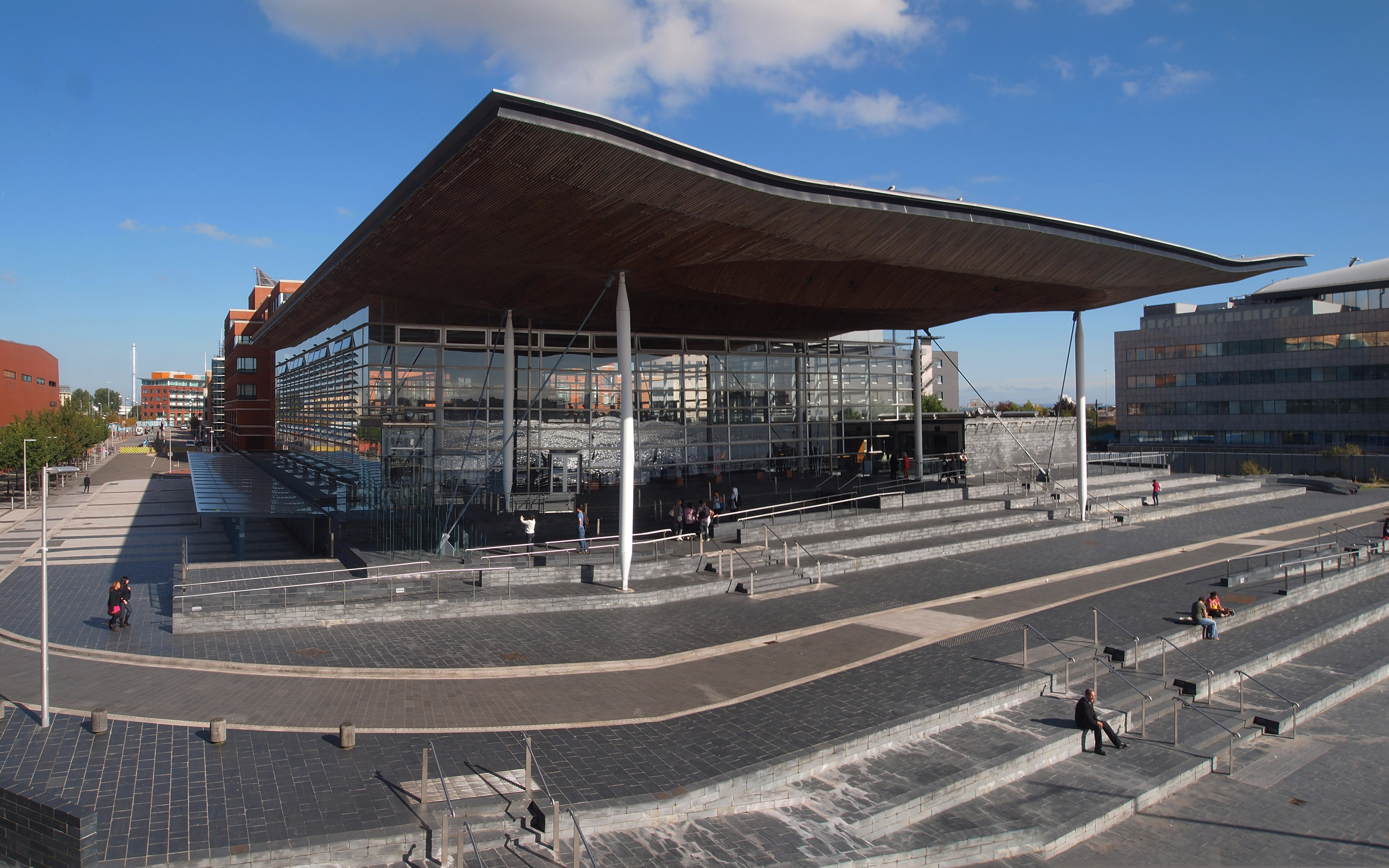
Senedd (Welsh Parliament)

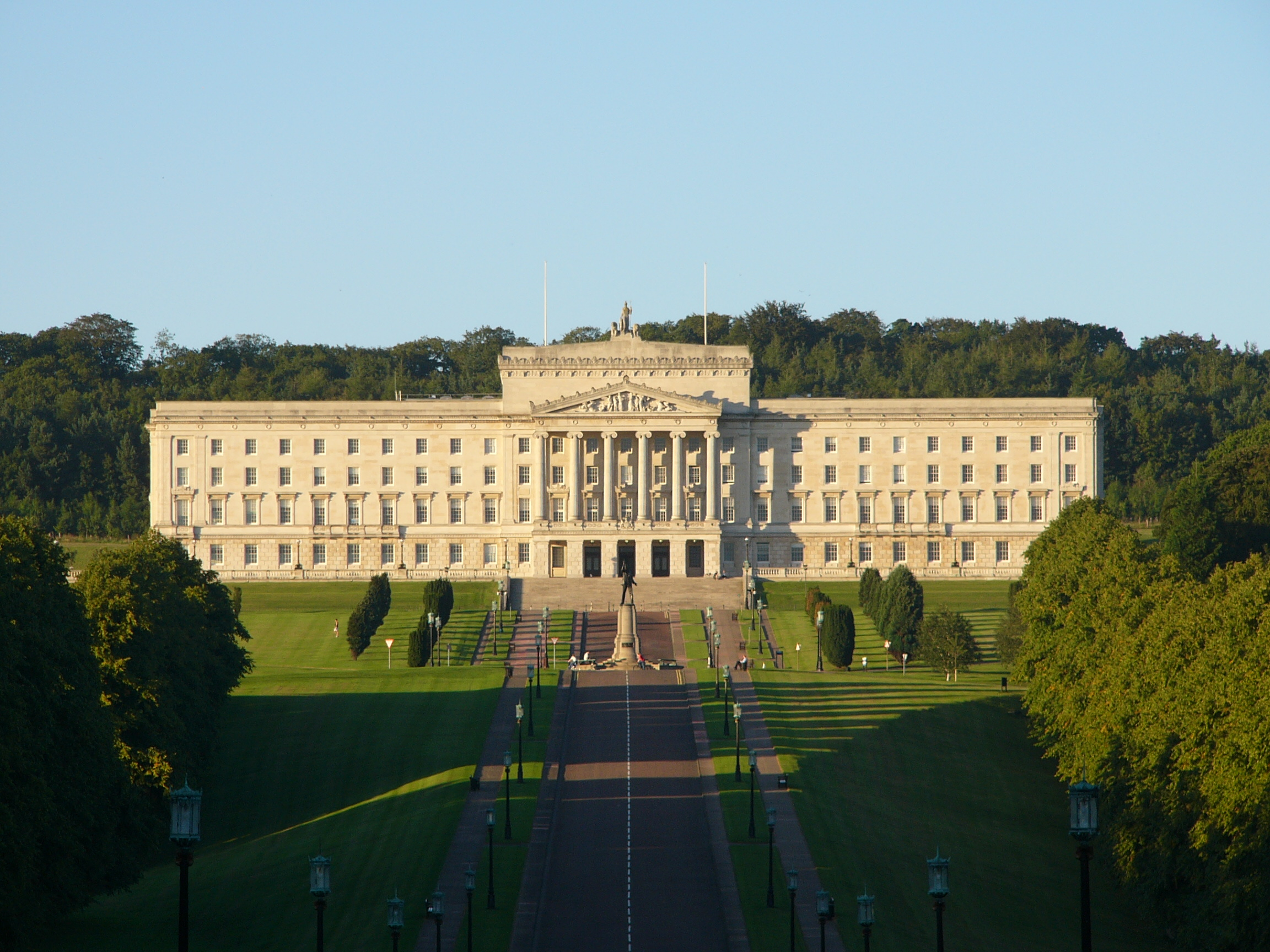
Stormont (Northern Ireland Assembly)

Buildings of the various institutions established as part of the devolution of power in the UK

In the United Kingdom, devolved government was created for Northern Ireland in 1921 by the Government of Ireland Act 1920, for Wales and Scotland in September 1997 following simple majority referendums, and in London in May 1998. Between 1998 and 1999, the Scottish Parliament, Senedd (Welsh Parliament), Northern Ireland Assembly and London Assembly were established by law. The Campaign for an English Parliament, which supports English devolution (i.e. the establishment of a separate English parliament or assembly) was formed in 1998.

A referendum was held in Scotland on 18 September 2014 which asked citizens whether Scotland should be an independent country. By a margin of approximately 55 percent to 45 percent, people living in Scotland rejected the proposal. The leaders of the three largest British political parties pledged on 16 September 2014 a new devolution settlement for Scotland in the event of a No vote, promising to deliver "faster, safer and better change", and as a result of this vote and promises made during the referendum campaign, British Prime Minister David Cameron announced plans to devolve additional powers to the Scottish government, the nature of which would be determined by the Smith Commission. These powers were subsequently transferred in the Scotland Act 2016. Following the outcome of the Brexit vote on 23 June 2016, calls for further devolution have been raised, including differential membership of the European single market for the devolved areas of the United Kingdom.

The Yorkshire Party is a regionalist political party in Yorkshire, a historic county of England. Founded in 2014, it campaigns for the establishment of a devolved Yorkshire Assembly within the UK, with powers over education, environment, transport and housing. In the 2021 West Yorkshire mayoral election, the Yorkshire Party came 3rd.

=== United States ===
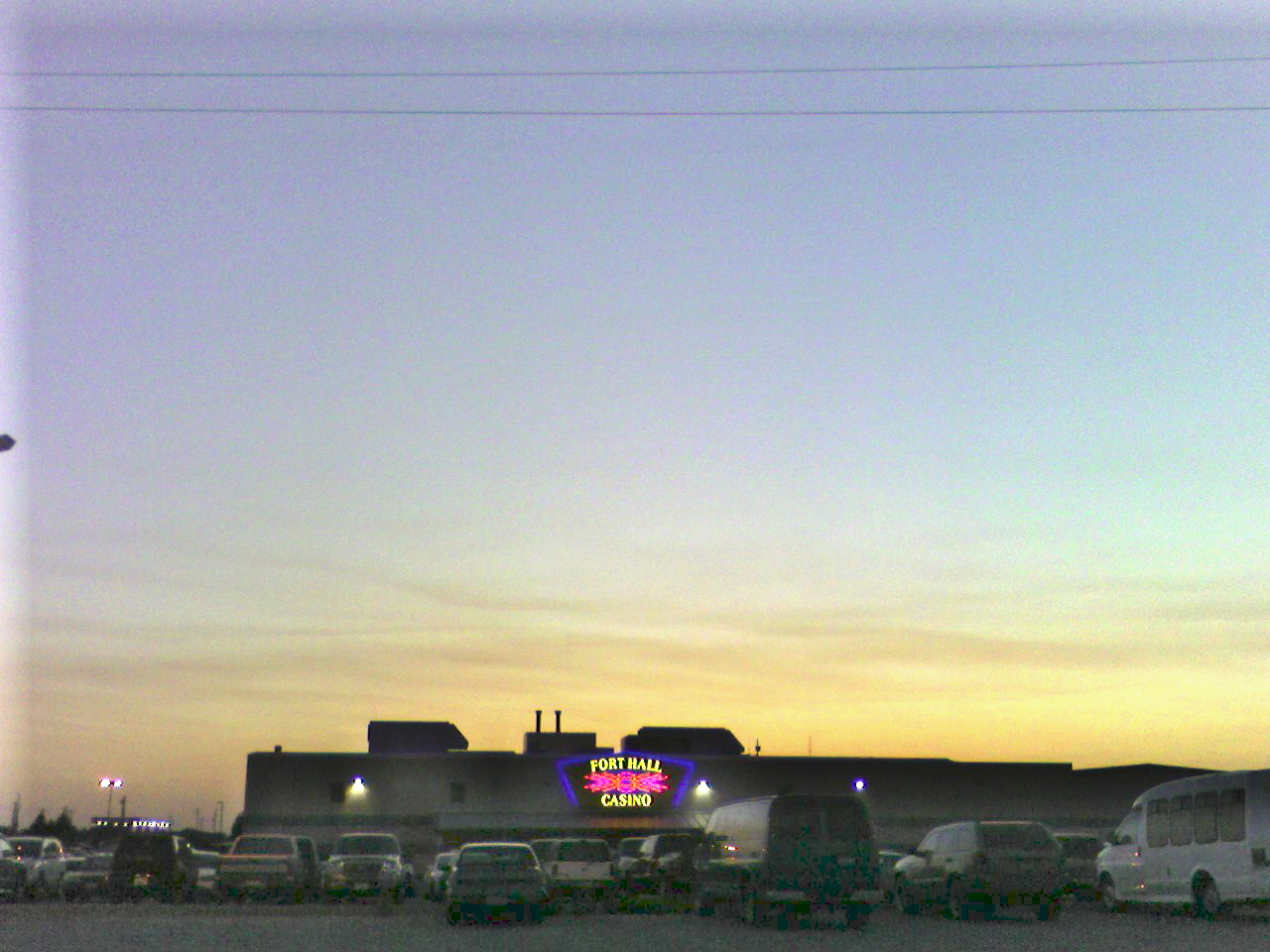
Fort Hall Indian Casino, Idaho. Gambling is allowed within Native American reservation lands while illegal on non-reservation land geographically in the same state.

In the United States the federal government and state governments are sovereign. As Native American tribes and the governments they formed pre-date the formation of the United States, their legal position as sovereigns co-exists alongside the individual states and the Federal government. The legal relationships with Native American tribes and their government structures are the jurisdiction of Congress. This relationship is unique to each of the more than 500 tribes and also involves international treaties between various tribes and Spain, Great Britain, and the eventual United States. Territories are under the direct jurisdiction of Congress. Territorial governments are thus devolved by acts of Congress. Political subdivisions of a state, such as a county or municipality, are a type of devolved government and are defined by individual state constitutions and laws.

==== District of Columbia ====
In the United States, the District of Columbia offers an illustration of devolved government. The District is separate from any state, and has its own elected government. In many ways, on a day-to-day basis, it operates much like another state, with its own laws, court system, Department of Motor Vehicles, public university, and so on. However, the governments of the 50 states are reserved a broad range of powers in the U.S. Constitution, and most of their laws cannot be voided by any act of U.S. federal government. The District of Columbia, by contrast, is constitutionally under the sole control of the United States Congress, which created the current District government by statute. Any law passed by the District legislature can be nullified by congressional action, and indeed the District government could be significantly altered or eliminated by a simple majority vote in Congress.

== List of unitary states with devolution ==
Year	State	Government type	Subdivisions article	Main regional units	Other regional units
1995	Azerbaijan	Semi-presidential republic under a hereditary dictatorship	Administrative divisions of Azerbaijan	67 rayons and 11 cities	Autonomous republic: Nakhchivan
2009	Bolivia	Presidential republic	Departments of Bolivia	9 departments	
1980	Chile	Presidential republic	Regions of Chile	15 regions	
1949	China	Communist state	Administrative divisions of China	22 provinces (Taiwan is claimed as the 23rd province), 5 autonomous regions and 4 municipalities	Two special administrative regions: Hong Kong; Macau
1991	Colombia	Presidential republic	Departments of Colombia	32 departments	One Capital District, Bogotá, has the same autonomy and privileges as Colombian Departments.
1992	Czech Republic	Parliamentary republic	Regions of the Czech Republic	13 regions (kraje)	1 Capital District, Prague, has the same autonomy and privileges as Czech regions.
1849	Denmark	Parliamentary constitutional monarchy	Regions of Denmark	5 regions and 98 communes	Two autonomous territories: Greenland; Faroe Islands
1919	Finland	Parliamentary republic	Regions of Finland	19 regions	Åland
1982	France	Semi-presidential republic	Regions of France	18 regions	
1991	Georgia	Parliamentary republic	Administrative divisions of Georgia	9 regions (one of them declared de facto independence: Abkhazia (1999)), 1 city, and 2 autonomous republics (one of them also declared de facto independence: South Ossetia (2006))	Two regions: Adjara; South Ossetia (Tskhinvali region)
1975	Greece	Parliamentary republic	Administrative divisions of Greece	13 regions	Mount Athos
1950	Indonesia	Presidential republic	Provinces of Indonesia	38 provinces, of which 9 have special status	Provinces with special status: Aceh; Jakarta; Yogyakarta (de jure a region, not a province); Central Papua; Highland Papua; Papua; South Papua; Southwest Papua; West Papua
1946	Italy	Parliamentary republic	Regions of Italy	20 regions, of which 5 have a special degree of autonomy	Two autonomous provinces: South Tyrol; Trentino
1947	Japan	Parliamentary constitutional monarchy	Prefectures of Japan	47 prefectures	
1964	Kenya	Presidential republic	Counties of Kenya	47 counties based on 47 districts, with 47 elected governors, recognized by 2010 Constitution	
1991	Moldova	Parliamentary republic	Administrative divisions of Moldova	32 districts and 3 municipalities	Two provinces: Gagauzia; Transnistria (de facto an independent state)
1918	Monaco	Parliamentary semi-constitutional monarchy	Municipality of Monaco	1 municipality	
1989	Myanmar	Assembly-independent republic under a military junta	Administrative divisions of Myanmar	7 states and 7 divisions	De jure autonomous state: Wa State
1954	Netherlands	Parliamentary constitutional monarchy	Provinces of the Netherlands	12 provinces and 3 Caribbean public bodies	Minor constituent countries: Aruba; Curaçao; Sint Maarten
1986	New Zealand	Parliamentary constitutional monarchy	Regions of New Zealand	16 regions	Two territories in free association: Cook Islands; Niue; Two dependencies: Tokelau; Ross
1986	Nicaragua	Diarchic presidential socialist republic under an authoritarian dictatorship	Departments of Nicaragua	15 departments	Two autonomous regions: North Atlantic; South Atlantic
1975	Papua New Guinea	Parliamentary constitutional monarchy	Provinces of Papua New Guinea	20 provinces	One capital territory: National Capital District; One autonomous region: Bougainville
1993	Peru	Semi-presidential republic	Regions of Peru	25 regions	One province at the first order: Lima
1987	Philippines	Presidential republic	Administrative divisions of the Philippines	17 regions (including BARMM), 82 provinces, 144 cities, 1,491 municipalities, and 42,028 barangays	Bangsamoro Autonomous Region in Muslim Mindanao
1976	Portugal	Semi-presidential republic	Administrative divisions of Portugal	308 municipalities	Two Autonomous Regions: Azores; Madeira
2006	Serbia	Parliamentary republic	Administrative divisions of Serbia	138 municipalities and 23 cities	Two autonomous provinces: Vojvodina; Kosovo and Metohija (Serbia does not recognise the independence of Kosovo)
1978	Solomon Islands	Parliamentary constitutional monarchy	Provinces of the Solomon Islands	9 provinces	One capital territory: Honiara
1996	South Africa	Parliamentary republic with an executive presidency	Provinces of South Africa	9 provinces	
1948 (Note: The first local elections were held in 1952 due to the Korean War. Local governance was suspended in the aftermath of the May 16 coup of 1961, when it was announced that local autonomy would be suspended until the Korean reunification) 1987 (Note: Local governance was revived in the aftermath of the June Democratic Struggle. Local council elections have been held since 1991, and elections for heads of local governments since 1995.)	South Korea	Presidential republic	Administrative divisions of South Korea	5 provinces and 5 cities	One special city; Seoul; One special self-governing city; Sejong; One special metropolitan city; Jeonnam-Gwangju; Three special self-governing provinces; Jeju; Gangwon; North Jeolla Province
1978	Spain	Parliamentary constitutional monarchy	Autonomous communities of Spain (nationalities and regions of Spain)	17 autonomous communities of which 2 have a special degree of tax raising autonomy	Two autonomous cities: Ceuta; Melilla
1987	Sri Lanka	Semi-presidential republic	Provinces of Sri Lanka	9 provinces	
1992	Sweden	Parliamentary constitutional monarchy	Regions of Sweden, Municipalities of Sweden	21 regions and 290 municipalities	
1950	Taiwan	Semi-presidential republic	Administrative divisions of Taiwan	22 subdivisions	
1992	Tajikistan	Semi-presidential republic under an authoritarian dictatorship	Provinces of Tajikistan	2 provinces, 1 autonomous province (Gorno-Badakhshan) and a zone of direct central rule (Districts of Republican Subordination).	One autonomous city
1977	Tanzania	Dominant-party presidential republic	Regions of Tanzania	30 regions	Zanzibar
1976	Trinidad and Tobago	Parliamentary republic	Regions and municipalities of Trinidad and Tobago	9 regions and 5 municipalities	Tobago
1996	Ukraine	Semi-presidential republic	Administrative divisions of Ukraine	24 oblasts (provinces) and one autonomous republic	Autonomous Republic of Crimea (de jure; annexed by Russia as the Republic of Crimea)
1998 (Note: Northern Ireland.); 1999 (Note: Scotland and Wales.)	United Kingdom	Parliamentary constitutional monarchy	Countries of the United Kingdom (Home Nations)	4 constituent countries, of which 3 have devolved governments	Overseas territories, Crown dependencies
1991	Uzbekistan	Semi-presidential republic	Provinces of Uzbekistan	9 provinces and one independent city	Karakalpakstan

== See also ==
- Federalism in China
- Tiao-kuai – Quasi-federal administration in China.
- Home rule – Governance of a colony, dependent country, locality, or region by its own citizens
- Principle of conferral – EU acts at the behest of its members
- Royal Commission on the Constitution (United Kingdom) – UK enquiry 1969–1973
- Scotland Act 2012 – Act of the Parliament of the United Kingdom to increase Scottish devolution
- States and Territories of Australia – National subdivisions and second level of government of Australia.
- Subsidiarity – Principle of social organization
- Territories of the United States
- West Lothian question – UK constitutional anomaly
