= Nanuit Itillinga National Wildlife Area =

Protected area in Nunavut, Canada

- Polar Bear Pass National Wildlife Area
- IUCN category IV (habitat/species management area)
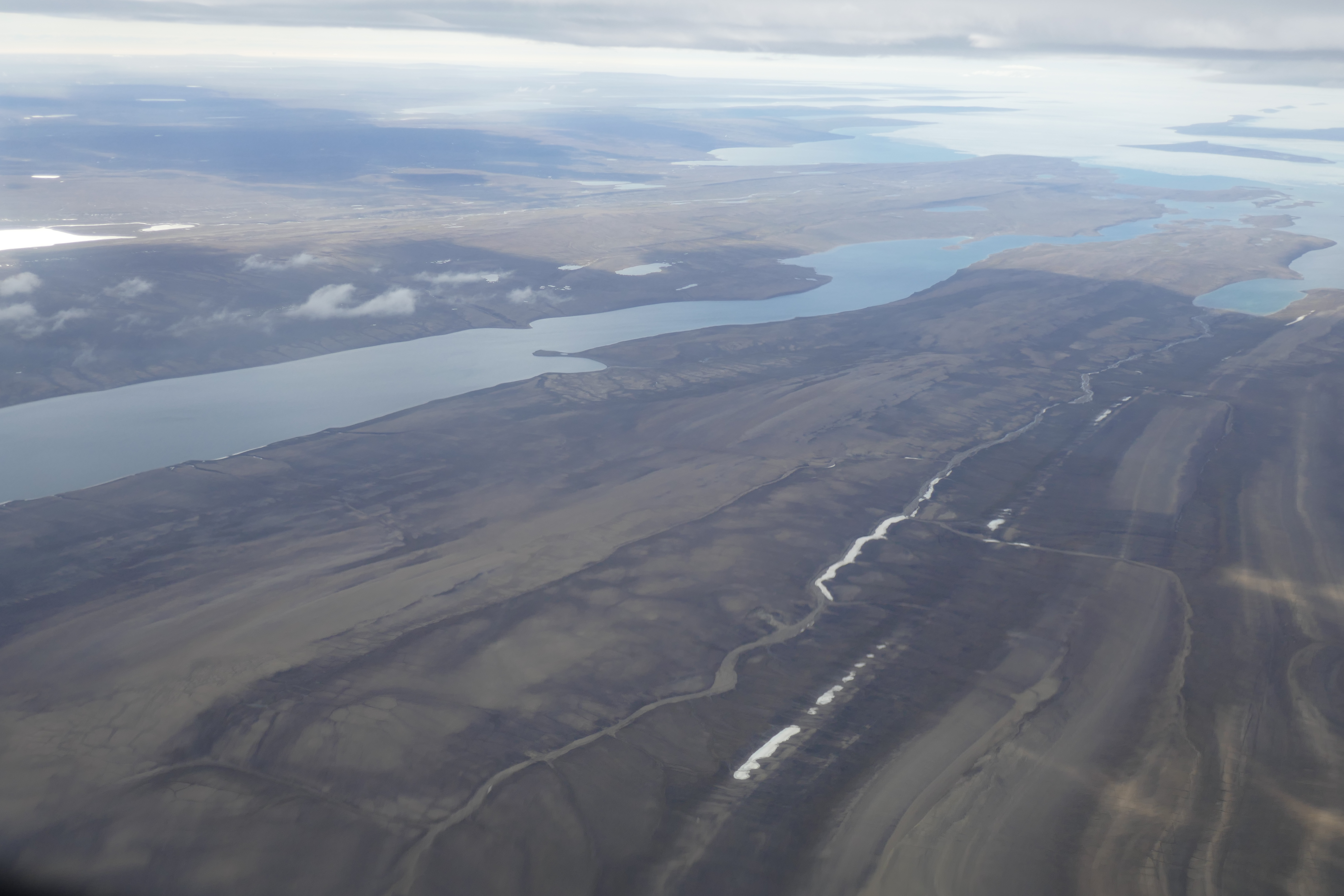

- Location within Nunavut
- Interactive map of Nanuit Itillinga National Wildlife Area
- Location: Bathurst Island, Qikiqtaaluk Region, Nunavut, Canada
- Nearest town: Resolute, Nunavut
- Coordinates: 75°40′N 98°55′W
- Area: 2,675 km^{2} (1,033 sq mi)
- Established: 1 January 1985

Ramsar Wetland
- Designated: 24 May 1982
- Reference no.: 245

Nanuit Itillinga National Wildlife Area formerly the Polar Bear Pass National Wildlife Area is a National Wildlife Area on Bathurst Island within the Qikiqtaaluk Region, Nunavut, Canada. It is on federal Crown land, and is administered by the Canadian Wildlife Service, a division of Environment and Climate Change Canada, with respect to the Canada Wildlife Act's National Wildlife Area Regulations. Land use is also subject to the Nunavut Land Claims Agreement. To the north and west is Qausuittuq National Park.

The National Wildlife Area (NWA) received the federally designated conservation status on 1 January 1985. Of its 2,675 km^{2} (1,033 sq mi) in overall size, 214 km^{2} (83 sq mi) is a marine area with marine, intertidal, and subtidal components.

== Geography and geology ==
Polar Bear Pass is one of the largest National Wildlife Areas in Canada and is located between Graham Moore Bay and Queens Channel in the Arctic Archipelago. The area consists of a wide valley bordered on the north and south by low hills. These hills, which can be described as long ridges and folds, are the result of an east-west thrust fault composing the geologic body of Polar Bear Pass. The northern hills comprise the upthrust part of the fault and are generally taller than the southern hills. The tallest hills in the pass, the Scoresby Hills, are located in the north-east and reach an elevation of 240 m (790 ft).

The rest of the hilltops do not typically exceed more than 180 m (590 ft). These ridges are covered mostly by lichens, with the exception of a few Arctic flowers. At their highest points, there is effectually no life or vegetation. There are also tor-like rock formations on the northern border of the wildlife area that provide dens and nesting spots for local wildlife. These structures were formed from the erosion of ancient coral reefs. They are essentially tall stacks of Devonian-era sedimentary rock, reaching up to 10 meters high.

There are many rivers, streams, marshes and lakes within Polar Bear Pass. To the north, there is the Goodsir River, along with many other small streams, that flow south and east into the Goodsir Inlet. In the south, the Caledonian River flows north into the NWA and then west into the Arctic Ocean. The two largest lakes in the pass are "Obloomi" and "Hunting Camp", but there are many other smaller lakes and ponds, none of which exceed 2 m (6 ft 7 in) in depth. The water in the pass does not drain effectively due to the permafrost beneath it. This permafrost, along with a thin layer of soil which freezes and thaws each year, creates rare ground patterns. The valley floor itself contains comprehensive wetlands. These include seasonal rivers, streams, ponds and marshes, but also permanent freshwater lakes, ponds, marshes and swamps. The inland wetlands also include tundra wetlands and peatlands. On the coast, intertidal mud, sand, and salt flats as well as rocky marine shores are considered wetlands.

== Climate ==
Cold temperatures, calm winds, and little precipitation define Polar Bear Pass's climate. The three coldest months (December through February) have an average temperature of −35 °C (−31 °F), while the three warmest months (June through August) have a range of −1 to 4 °C (30 to 39 °F). The amount of snowfall is often low (up to 7 cm [2.8 in]), and the majority of the yearly precipitation comes as rain.

Due to the sparse precipitation, Bathurst Island has a "polar desert" environment; yet, a combination of factors have led to a more productive ecology. The local wind patterns and the nearby hills reduce the amount of cloud cover over the pass. The increase in solar energy results in a longer growing season. Additional key factors in the growth of this biological oasis include the poor drainage in the lowlands, the persistence of moisture well after snowfall, the absorption of nutrients with runoff from the nearby hills, and the underlying marine sediments.

Polar night begins with the last sunset in early November and civil twilight stops the last week of the month giving night until the middle of January. Beginning in early February, the sun begins to rise over the horizon, and by the second week of April civil twilight ends and the area has continuous daylight followed by the midnight sun by the end of the month which will remain until the first sunset in mid-August. May sees the first above-freezing temperatures, and summertime averages are around 4 °C (39 °F). Early in July, river ice begins to break up, then larger ponds and lakes. Early in September, ponds start to ice, then larger lakes and rivers. After the first few days of November, the sun continues to be below the horizon.

== People and culture ==
There is a rich history within the peoples of Nunavut. The ancestors of the Inuit can be traced to over 8,500 years ago, spanning everywhere from the northern coast of Alaska to the west coasts of Nunavut. Methods of oral tradition, where stories of the past, present, and future are told to each generation, preserve the history and culture of the Inuit. Bathurst Island, home of Polar Bear Pass National Wildlife Area, is part of the Arctic Archipelago and the Qikiqtaaluk Region of Nunavut.

About thirteen communities reside in the Qikiqtaaluk, with around 10 communities historically depending on the harvest of caribou. As the community of Inuit expanded their land use, development of new knowledge, skills, and technology on the hunting of marine animals took place during the winter, when the water in the north would become frozen over. While using other methods for food, such as fishing and catching birds, the caribou found in Nunavut provide most food, clothing, and shelter for the more inland communities.

== Wildlife ==
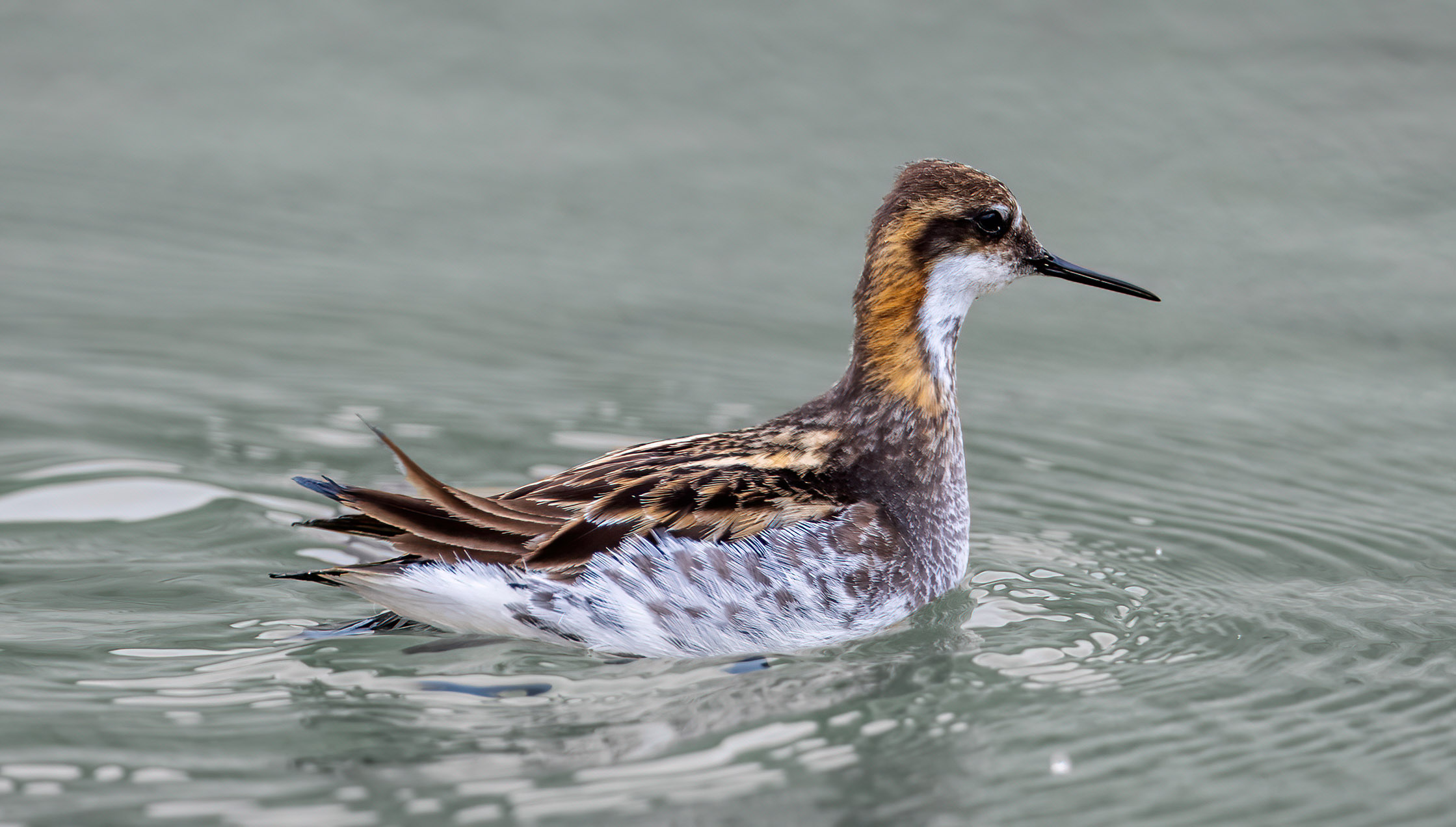
Red phalarope

Polar Bear Pass National Wildlife Area has at least 54 species of birds and 11 mammals that occupy the area. Some of the mammals include lemmings, muskoxen, Peary caribou, walrus, polar bear, and ringed seal. 30 of the 54 species of birds that occupy the area use it for breeding, including the red phalarope. The red phalarope migrates from various parts of the world to breed and nest in Canada. Due a high proportion of the global population being in Canada, the countries responsibility for conservation of the species has been evaluated as very high. Other prominent birds include waterfowl, brant goose, and shorebirds.

=== Endangered species ===
Polar Bear Pass National Wildlife Area is home to two endangered species: polar bears (Ursus maritimus) and Peary caribou (Rangifer arcticus pearyi).

Polar bears have been assessed as a species of special concern since 1991 by the Committee on the Status of Endangered Wildlife in Canada (COSEWIC). Polar bears are listed on the Federal Species at Risk Act (SARA) added in 2011. Polar bears are also protected under the Convention on International Trade in Endangered Species of Wild Fauna and Flora abbreviated to CITES. The assessment of the polar bears is in large part due to the increasing loss of sea ice that is a vital part of their habitat and hunting patterns.

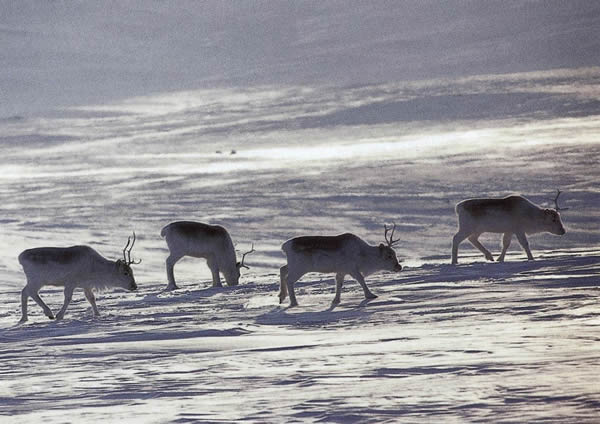
Peary caribou

Peary caribou, a subspecies of caribou endemic to the Arctic Archipelago, have been assessed as threatened since 2015 by COSEWIC. Peary Caribou was assessed as threatened because of loss of sea ice, in respect to climate change and a large die-off in the 1990’s related to severe weather. Peary Caribou are also protected under The Species at Risk Act (SARA) as of 2011.

== History of the NWA ==
The first area singled out for environmental protections was the Bracerbridge-Goodsir Inlet in the 1970’s under the International Biological Program (IBP). This was due to research that was conducted from 1968 to 1993 by the High Arctic research station that had studied the life histories and ecology of organisms living within the Polar Bear Pass. Further environmental significance was given to the Polar Bear Pass in 1982, when the Ramsar Convention indicated that the area was distinguished as a Wetland of International Importance. Because of these distinctions, environmental importance and both cultural and industrial importance, in 1986, the pass was given the title of NWA, meaning National Wildlife Area.

In 1993, the Nunavut Land Claims Agreement was created and signed, which set in stone the cultural importance of the area, solidifying even more the environmental protections of the park. This meant that Nunavut was federally considered a territory and could be led in tandem with Inuit governance with cultural and ancestral tradition recognized and respected within the territory of Nunavut.

== Land claim agreements ==
Environment and Climate Change Canada (ECCC) and Sulukvaut Area Co-management Committee (ACMC) of Resolute Bay, Nunavut, are currently in partnership in managing the Polar Bear Pass National Wildlife Area.

On May 25, 1993, the official Nunavut Land Claims Agreement was signed, decided in partnership with the Government of Canada, the Tunngavik Federation of Nunavut, and the Government of the Northwest Territories (Note: This was prior to division of the Northwest Territories into Nunavut and the current Northwest Territories. See History of the Northwest Territories#Late 20th century (1971–2000) and History of Nunavut#Towards autonomy.) This act helped to place Nunavut as a federally recognized territory, granting the government of Nunavut responsibilities in relation to health, education, environmental protection, and economic development. Although Inuit had to give up their Aboriginal title to Nunavut through this land agreement, the title is still legally recognized on ancestral lands, and the Agreement protects the rights of the Indigenous Inuit to continue in practicing their traditional activities.

Held in the Nunavut Land Claims Agreement, it is stated that, in efforts to protect and conserve the wildlife there, the National Wildlife Area is restricted to the public. Only Nunavut beneficiaries and those with updated permits can have access to the Polar Bear Pass National Wildlife Area, where they are allowed to harvest the wildlife for their economic, social and cultural needs.

== Management ==
In order to keep NWA's protected, the parks keep strict rules that only specified people with permits are allowed to be in the park such as researchers as well as Nunavut beneficiaries, Inuit that have cultural ties to the land. This is to prevent any activities that can harm and cause changes to the environment of the park as well as protecting cultural significance in the park. Conservation efforts in the park are primarily the management efforts by ECCC and ACMC, and regulations put in place by researchers and Inuit who engage in cultural activities in the area who are able to monitor the region. The last management plan was written in 1990, and since then there has not been any publication updates to the management plans of the park.

== See also ==
- List of National Wildlife Areas in Canada
