= History of Nunavut =

Timeline of the cultures of Nunavut

Maps showing the decline of the Dorset culture and the rise of the Thule people from c. 900 to 1500.

The history of Nunavut covers the period from the arrival of the Paleo-Eskimo thousands of years ago to present day. Prior to the colonization of the continent by Europeans, the lands encompassing present-day Nunavut were inhabited by several historical cultural groups, including the Pre-Dorset, the Dorsets, the Thule and their descendants, the Inuit.

From the 18th century, the territory was claimed by the British, with portions of Nunavut administered as a part the Rupert's Land, the North-Western Territory, or the British Arctic Territories. After the Deed of Surrender was signed in 1870, ownership of Rupert's Land and the North-Western Territory was transferred from the Hudson's Bay Company to the government of Canada. In 1880, the British Arctic Territories were also transferred to the Canadian government. Present-day Nunavut was initially administered as a part of the Northwest Territories, although by the end of 1912, the territory only administered the lands north of the 60th parallel north and east of Yukon.

During the late 20th century, the government of Canada entered into land claim negotiations with Inuit Tapiriit Kanatami. The Nunavut Land Claims Agreement was signed on May 25, 1993, with a six year transitional period for the establishment of a new territory. Nunavut was formally established as a Canadian territory on April 1, 1999.

== Early history ==
Mainland Nunavut was first populated approximately 4500 years ago by the Pre-Dorset, a diverse Paleo-Eskimo culture that migrated westward from the Bering Strait region, when the region was a geographical connection between Asia and America, called Beringia. Evidence suggests the Pre-Dorset culture was seasonally mobile, moving between settlements to take advantage of resources.

=== Dorset culture ===
The Pre-Dorset culture was succeeded by the Dorset culture about 2800 years ago. Differences between the Pre-Dorset and Dorset cultures include those in lithic technology, art, and styles of building. The Dorset culture additionally lacked the bow and arrow, which had been utilized by the pre-Dorset. The Dorset culture has been assumed to have developed from the Pre-Dorset, however the relationship between the two remains unclear.

Helluland, a location Norse explorers describe visiting in the Sagas of Icelanders has been connected to Nunavut's Baffin Island. Claims of contact between the Dorset and Norse, however, remain controversial.

=== Thule ===
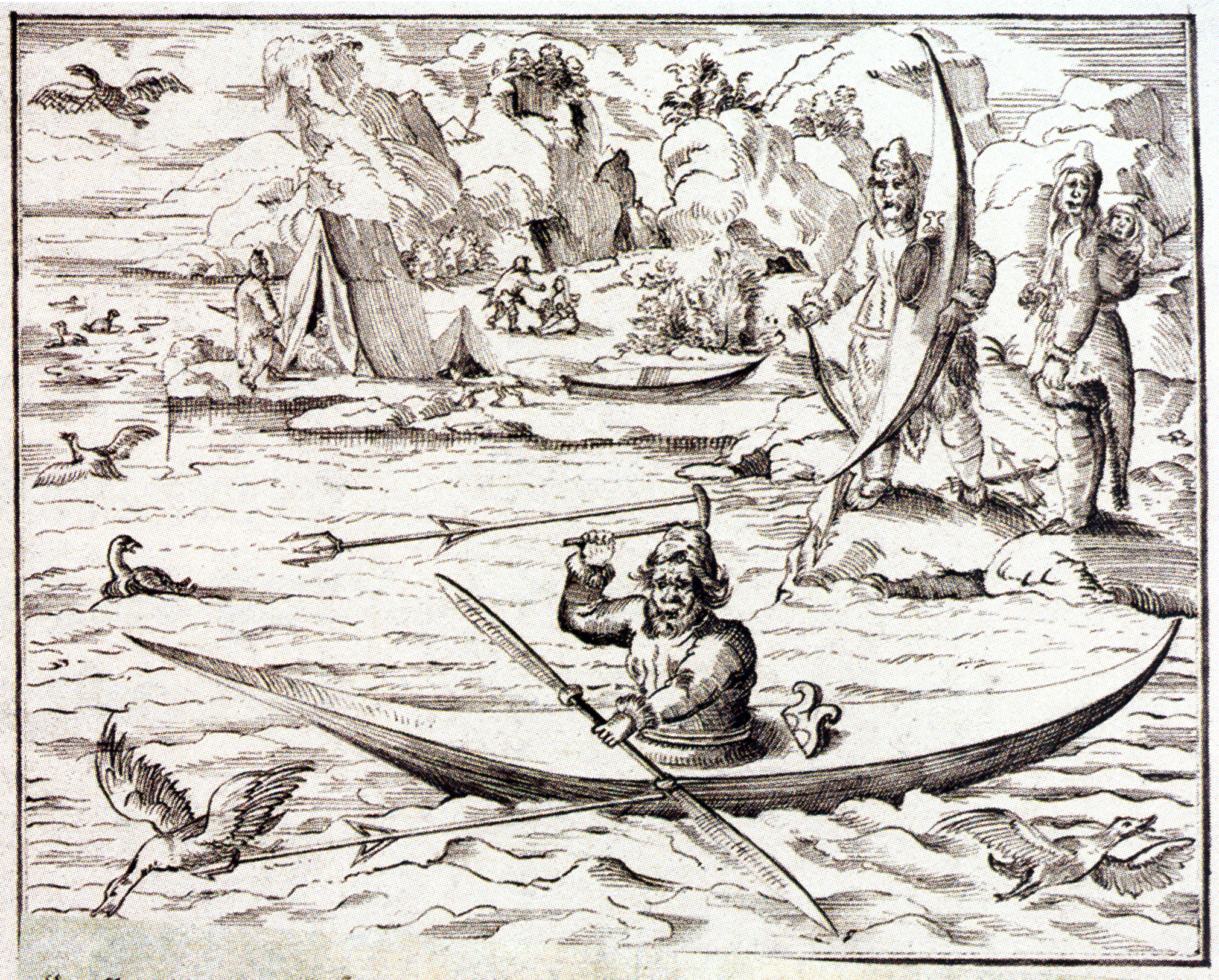
Inuit portrayed during one of Martin Frobisher's voyages to the region.

The Thule people, ancestors of the modern Inuit, began migrating into the Northwest Territories and Nunavut from Alaska in the 11th century. By 1300, the geographic extent of Thule settlement included most of modern Nunavut.

A number of hypotheses have been developed to explain the Thule migration. The historically dominant model posited by Robert McGhee holds that changes in bowhead whale populations brought about by the Medieval Warm Period drew Thule hunters westward. Other hypotheses connect the migration to population pressure, warfare, over-hunting, and Greenlandic iron deposits.

The migration of the Thule people coincides with the decline of the Dorset, who died out between 800 and 1500. While Thule settlers may have adopted Dorset harpoon and hunting technology, there is virtually no evidence confirming contact between the two populations.

=== European exploration ===
The written historical accounts of Nunavut begin in 1576, with an account by English explorer, Martin Frobisher. Frobisher, while leading an expedition to find the Northwest Passage, thought he had discovered gold ore around the body of water now known as Frobisher Bay on the coast of Baffin Island. While the ore turned out worthless, Frobisher made the first recorded European contact with the Inuit. Other explorers in search of the elusive Northwest Passage followed in the 17th century, including Henry Hudson, William Baffin and Robert Bylot. Despite these explorations, these events ultimately had no significant impact on Nunavut and its peoples.

=== Contact ===
Beginning around the 1820s, white whalers visited the region and started hunting thousands of whales. Whaling operations were soon established in nearby Cumberland Sound and Herschel Island. The whalers and the native Inuit began trading goods and supplies. Some Inuit began working with the whalers to hunt whales in exchange for various good such as tea, tobacco, equipment and guns. Meanwhile, the whalers sought furs and labor. By the late 19th century, whalers were a common presence in the region. However, this process also brought negative issues for the natives, including the introduction of addictive substances like alcohol and diseases which killed many.

=== Early 20th century ===
Trading in fur became the main economic activity in Nunavut during the early 20th century after whaling declined. Meanwhile, the Hudson's Bay Company (HBC) set up operations in the region during this period and eventually acted as an intermediary of the government. Rudimentary governance and social services were administered via trading posts owned by the HBC or religious organizations led by Christian missionaries. The fur trade ultimately led to many Inuit voluntarily or forcefully relocating to other locales along with abandoning traditional hunting and subsistence in favor of fur trapping. Despite the Northwest Territories government theoretically exercising control of the region, Nunavut was generally left alone until the aftermath of World War II.

== 20th century ==
=== Cold War forced relocations ===
Cornwallis and Ellesmere Islands feature in the history of the Cold War in the 1950s. Efforts to assert sovereignty in the High Arctic during the Cold War, i.e. the area's strategic geopolitical position, were part of the reason the federal government decided to forcibly relocate Inuit from northern Quebec to Resolute and Grise Fiord.

The first group of people were relocated in 1953 from Inukjuak, Quebec (then known as Port Harrison) and from Pond Inlet, Nunavut. They were promised homes and game to hunt, but the relocated people discovered no buildings and very little familiar wildlife. They also had to endure weeks of 24-hour darkness during the winter, and 24-hour sunlight during the summer, something that does not occur in northern Quebec. They were told that they would be returned home after a year if they wished, but this offer was later withdrawn as it would damage Canada's claims to sovereignty in the area and the Inuit were forced to stay. Eventually, the displaced Inuit learned the local beluga whale migration routes and were able to survive in the area, hunting over a range of 18,000 km^{2} (6,900 sq mi) each year.

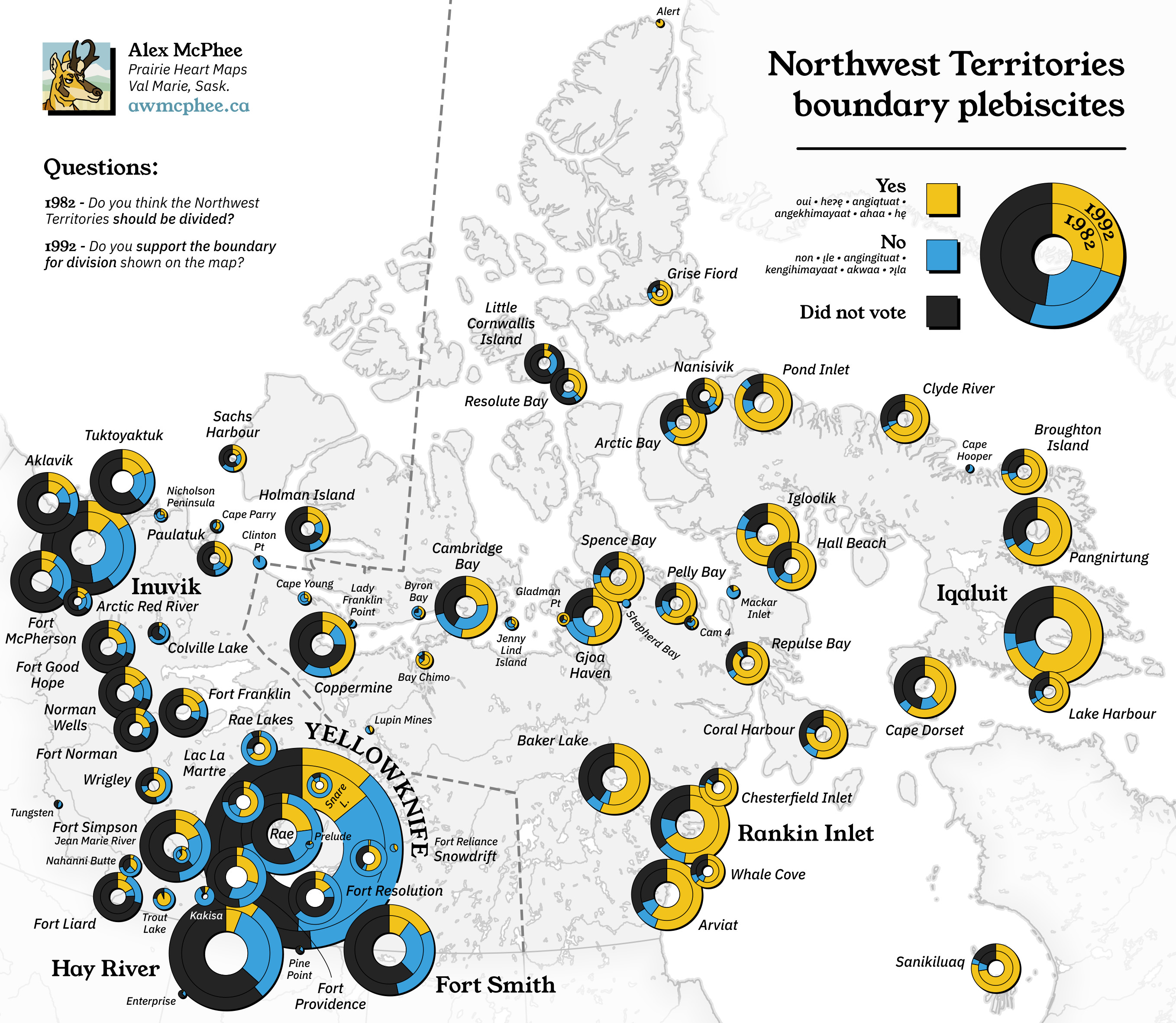
Map of the 1982 division and 1992 boundary plebiscite results.

In 1993, the Canadian government held hearings to investigate the relocation program. The Royal Commission on Aboriginal Peoples issued a report entitled The High Arctic Relocation: A Report on the 1953–55 Relocation. The government paid $10 million CAD to the survivors and their families, but did not apologize until August 18, 2010.

The whole story is told in Melanie McGrath's The Long Exile: A Tale of Inuit Betrayal and Survival in the High Arctic.

=== Towards autonomy ===
Leading up to the 1970s, there was some discussion of splitting the Northwest Territories into two separate jurisdictions in order to better reflect the demographic character of the territory. In 1966, a public commission of inquiry on Northwest Territories government reported, recommending against division of the Northwest Territories at the time.

In 1976, as part of the land claims negotiations between Inuit Tapiriit Kanatami (then called Inuit Tapirisat of Canada) and the federal government, the division of the Northwest Territories was discussed. On April 14, 1982, a plebiscite on division was held throughout the Northwest Territories with a majority of the residents voting in favour and the federal government gave a conditional agreement seven months later. The land claims agreement was decided in September 1992 and ratified by nearly 85% of the voters in Nunavut in a referendum. On May 25, 1993, the Nunavut Land Claims Agreement was signed and on June 10, 1993, the Nunavut Land Claims Agreement Act and the Nunavut Act were passed by the Canadian Parliament, with the transition completed on April 1, 1999. On January 18, 2024, the federal and territorial governments signed the Nunavut Lands and Resources Devolution Agreement; it gives the government of Nunavut control over the territory's land and resources. It is the largest land transfer in Canada's history.

== See also ==
- 1999 in Nunavut
