= 1992 Nunavut creation referendum =

Canadian territorial referendum

A referendum on the creation of the territory of Nunavut was held between 3 and 5 November 1992 in the territory set to become the new territory. It was approved by 69% of voters. On 25 May 1993 the Mulroney government and the Tunngavik Federation of Nunavut signed the Nunavut Land Claims Agreement. On 10 June 1993 the parliament of Canada passed two laws dividing the Northwest Territories and providing for the formation of Nunavut on 1 April 1999.

== Background ==
A 1982 referendum had approved the division of the Northwest Territories and the creation of a new territory, later to become Nunavut. The government of Canada gave a conditional agreement to the plan seven months later. In December 1991 the federal government reached an agreement with the Inuit on their land claims, with the "Parker line" set as the boundary between the existing territory and the new one. This was approved in a referendum in May 1992.

== Results ==
Choice	Votes	%
For		69
No		31
Invalid/blank votes		–
Total		100
Registered voters/turnout	9,648	81

== See also ==
- 1982 Northwest Territories division plebiscite
- Nunavut Land Claims Agreement
