= 2000 in Nunavut =

- Decades: 1990s; 2000s; 2010s; 2020s
- See also: History of Nunavut

Events from the Canadian territory of Nunavut in the year 2000

== Politics ==
- Premier: Paul Okalik
- Commissioner: Helen Maksagak
- Legislature: 1st Nunavut Legislature

== Events ==
=== August ===
Levi Barnabas stepped down as Speaker of the Nunavut Legislative Assembly and Member of Parliament for Quttiktuq after being convicted of sexual assault. Arviat MP Kevin O'Brien replaced Barnabas as Speaker.

=== November ===
==== November 27 ====
Jean Chrétien's Liberal party won the federal election and formed a majority government. In the single Nunavut Territory riding, Liberal Nancy Karetak-Lindell was re-elected for a second term with 69.01% of the votes, against New Democrat Palluq Susan Enuaraq with 18.26% of the votes, Mike Sherman of the Progressive Conservative Party with 8.20% of the votes, and Brian Robert Jones of the Green Party with 4.52% of the votes. This was the first federal election in this territory since its creation.

=== December ===
==== December 4 ====
Rebekah Williams wins the Quttiktuq election, defeating incumbent MP Levi Barnabas following his accusation of sexual assault.

== Births ==
=== January ===
==== January 11 ====
Sadie Pinksen, curler

== Deaths ==
=== March ===
Ipeelee Kilabuk, Member of Parliament for Central Baffin (1975–1979) and Central Baffin (1980–1983, 1987–1991) of the Legislative Assembly of the Northwest Territories.
