= Edward Attagutaluk =

Canadian politician

Edward Attagutaluk MLA

Member of the Legislative Assembly of Nunavut for Aggu
- Incumbent
- Assumed office December 15, 2025
- Preceded by: Joanna Quassa

Personal details
- Party: Non-partisan consensus government

Edward Attagutaluk is a Canadian politician, who was elected to the Legislative Assembly of Nunavut in a 2025 territorial by-election. He represents the electoral district of Aggu.
