= Paul Quassa =

Canadian politician (born 1952)

Paul Quassa MLA
- ᐹᓪ ᖁᐊᓴ

4th Premier of Nunavut
- In office November 21, 2017 – June 14, 2018
- Commissioner: Nellie Kusugak
- Preceded by: Peter Taptuna
- Succeeded by: Joe Savikataaq

Member of the Legislative Assembly of Nunavut for Aggu
- In office October 28, 2013 – August 13, 2021
- Preceded by: district created
- Succeeded by: Joanna Quassa

11th Speaker of the Legislative Assembly of Nunavut
- In office February 26, 2020 – August 13, 2021
- Preceded by: Simeon Mikkungwak
- Succeeded by: Tony Akoak

Personal details
- Born: January 12, 1952 (age 74) Igloolik, Northwest Territories (now Nunavut)
- Party: non-partisan consensus government
- Relatives: Joanna Quassa (sister in-law)
- Occupation: Indigenous land claims negotiator, journalist and MLA in Nunavut

Paul Aarulaaq Quassa (Inuktitut: ᐹᓪ ᖁᐊᓴ; born January 12, 1952) is a Canadian politician who served as the fourth premier of Nunavut from November 2017 to June 2018. He served as a Member of the Legislative Assembly of Nunavut, representing Aggu from 2013 until 2021.

An Inuk, Quassa became involved in Inuit politics at the age of 20, and was one of the chief negotiators of the Nunavut Land Claims Agreement that created the modern territory of Nunavut.

== Early life ==
Quassa was born in Manitok, a hunting camp near Igloolik. Born in an igloo, he was raised for the first years of his life in what he described as "the Inuit traditional way of life", part of the last generation to do so. At the age of six, he was taken to a Canadian Indian residential school in Churchill, Manitoba.

== Land claims work ==
He returned to Igloolik in 1972 to work on land claims and served as president of the Tunngavik Federation of Nunavut in the early 1990s. He was one of the negotiators of, and a signatory of, the Nunavut Land Claims Agreement settlement that led to the establishment of Nunavut.

He was dropped from the presidency of TFN in 1992 following allegations of sexual assault against a woman, but received a discharge in court and was subsequently reinstated as president of the organization and the successor Nunavut Tunngavik Incorporated. Quassa also worked as a journalist with CBC North, the Inuit Broadcasting Corporation and Isuma Productions.

== Political career ==
First elected to the Legislative Assembly of Nunavut in the 2013 election, he represents the electoral district of Aggu. He served in the Executive Council of Nunavut as Minister of Education during the 4th Legislative Assembly of Nunavut. As Education Minister, he unsuccessfully attempted to introduce bilingual education in schools, in both English and Inuktitut.

He was reelected in the 2017 election, and was subsequently selected as premier at the Nunavut Leadership Forum under the territory's consensus government system.

=== Vote of no confidence ===
On June 14, 2018, he lost a non-confidence vote by 16–3, with two abstentions. The motion of no-confidence was tabled by MLA John Main, in response to what Main described as an "autocratic style" of leadership, and wider criticism by MLAs of the spending decisions made by Quassa's government.

Quassa was replaced as Premier by former deputy premier Joe Savikataaq.

On February 26, 2020, he was selected as the new Speaker of the Legislative Assembly of Nunavut following the resignation of Simeon Mikkungwak from the legislature the previous day. He did not seek re-election in 2021.
