= 1999 in Nunavut =

- Decades: 1990s; 2000s; 2010s
- See also: History of Nunavut

Events from the year 1999 in the Canadian territory of Nunavut.

== Politics ==
- Prime Minister: Paul Okalik
- Commissioner: Helen Maksagak
- Legislature: 1st Nunavut Legislature

== Events ==
- Founding of the French-speaking portal Nordicité.com

=== February ===
- February 15: First Nunavut general election.

=== April ===
- April 1:
  - Nunavut joins the Confederation as the 3rd Canadian territory.
  - Paul Okalik becomes the first of the prime ministers of Nunavut.
  - Quttiktuq Member of Parliament Levi Barnabas becomes the first Speaker of the Legislative Assembly of Nunavut.

=== September ===
- Completion of the Legislative Building of Nunavut in Iqaluit.

== Births ==
- February 1: Christianne West, curling player.
