= Qausuittuq National Park =

National park in Nunavut, Canada

- Parc national Qausuittuq
- IUCN category II (national park)
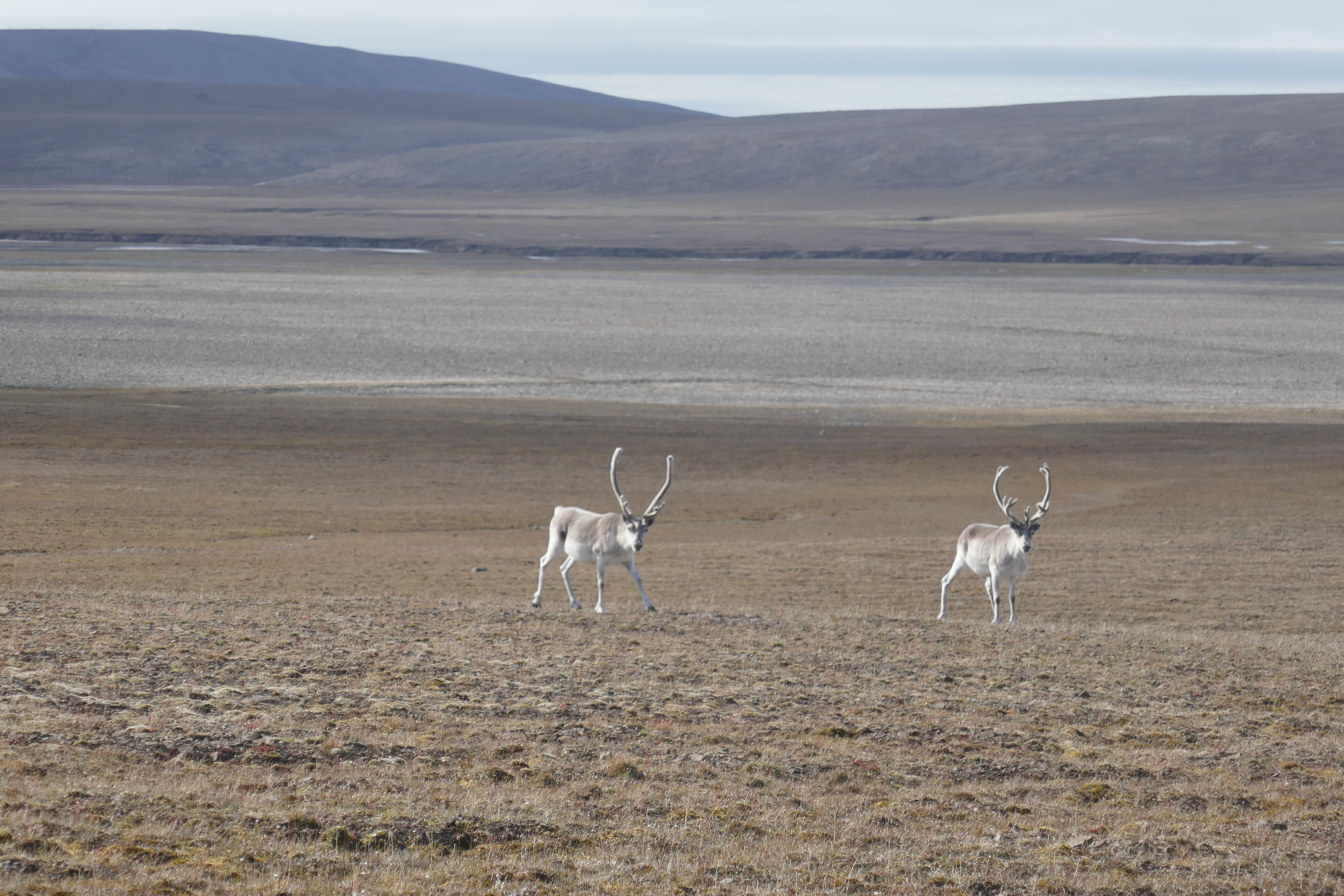
- Caribou in Qausuittuq National Park

- Location within Canada Location within Nunavut
- Interactive map of Qausuittuq National Park
- Location: Nunavut; Canada
- Nearest city: Resolute
- Coordinates: 76°00′N 100°00′W
- Area: greater than 11,000 km^{2} (4,200 sq mi)
- Established: September 1, 2015
- Governing body: Parks Canada

Qausuittuq National Park (pronounced Qow-soo-ee-tooq, from Inuktitut meaning place where the sun does not rise) is a national park located on northwest Bathurst Island in Nunavut. It was established on September 1, 2015, becoming Canada's 45th national park.

This area was chosen to represent the Western High Arctic natural region, one of 39 such regions identified by Parks Canada. This region encompasses most of the high Arctic Archipelago (the Queen Elizabeth Islands and the Grinnell Peninsula on Devon Island, but not Ellesmere Island or Axel Heiberg Island). The park also protects important Peary caribou habitat. It is north of the existing Polar Bear Pass National Wildlife Area.

== History ==
Archaeological studies in the Bathurst Island area indicate occasional human use over the past 4500 years by prehistoric as well as historic Dorset and Thule Inuit. Human presence fluctuated with changes in climate, ice cover and the corresponding availability of wildlife for subsistence. Human use was primarily in the southern and eastern part of Bathurst Island, rather than within the proposed park area itself.

The area was explored by British naval expeditions during the mid-nineteenth century, primarily those associated with the search for the lost Franklin expedition. Several cairns remain on the north coast. Exploration of the area continued sporadically, including scientific and commercial studies beginning during the 1960s.

The community of Resolute, located on Cornwallis Island to the southeast of the park, was established in 1953. Inuit from the community use the land and waters of the Bathurst Island area to hunt and fish.

A park feasibility study was initiated in 1994. The work included a Mineral and Energy Resources Assessment. This report was released in 1999 and the overall park feasibility study was concluded in 2000. The lands on northern Bathurst Island were first withdrawn for the purpose of establishing a national park in 1996. In 2009 Parks Canada entered into negotiations with the communities most closely connected to the proposed park with respect to establishing an Inuit Impact and Benefit Agreement (IIBA) for the establishment of the park.

In 2015, the federal government introduced a bill to create the park, which received approval on June 24. The law specified that it would come into force on either the day of approval or on September 1, 2015—whichever came latest. With approval given in June, the park was legally created on September 1.

The proposed name of the park was "Tuktusiuqvialuk National Park". The Qausuittuq name was selected through a contest in the local area.

Qausuittuq National Park was open to the public and received its first visitors in 2016.

== Geology and climate ==
The park geology is composed primarily of sedimentary rocks such as limestone, sandstone and dolomite. The area was glaciated in the past as evidenced by landforms such as eskers, moraines and beach terraces. The area is generally rolling hills.

Bathurst Island has a cold dry climate. The cool central Arctic climate pushes almost unimpeded into the low-lying islands of the northwest and north-central sector of the Queen Elizabeth islands; reaching to Bathurst Island. Mean temperatures range from -35 °C in January to 5 °C in July. Annual precipitation is less than 130 mm.

== Flora and fauna ==
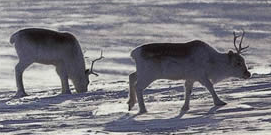
Peary caribou

The severe climate limits soil and nutrient development, which in turn limits vegetation. This region has low vascular plant diversity and is dominated by herbaceous species. Plants include purple saxifrage, dwarf willow, sedges, grasses, lichens and mosses.

Terrestrial wildlife species adapted to this environment include Peary caribou, muskoxen, Arctic wolves, Arctic foxes and bird species such as snowy owls, snow geese, king eiders, jaegers as well as various gulls and shorebirds. Marine species in the area include ringed seals, bearded seals, polar bears, walruses, bowhead whales, beluga whales and narwhals.

== See also ==
- List of national parks of Canada
