= Joanna Quassa =

Canadian politician

Joanna Quassa MLA

Member of the Legislative Assembly of Nunavut for Aggu
- In office November 19, 2021 – October 27, 2025
- Preceded by: Paul Quassa
- Succeeded by: Edward Attagutaluk

Personal details
- Party: non-partisan consensus government

Joanna Quassa is a Canadian Inuk politician, who was elected to the Legislative Assembly of Nunavut in the 2021 Nunavut general election. She represented the electoral district of Aggu.

She is the sister-in-law of her predecessor Paul Quassa, and previously served as mayor of Igloolik.

She ran for election to the assembly in the 2025 election and received the largest number of votes in the Aggu electoral district but with less than 2 per cent difference between her and Erasmus Ivvalu, triggering a judicial recount. As the final result was tied, a by-election was held on December 15, 2025; she lost it to Edward Attagutaluk, placing second.

== Electoral record ==
2025 Nunavut general election: Aggu
Candidate	Votes	%
Edward Attagutaluk	86	45.26
Joanna Quassa	26	13.68
George Qaunaq	25	13.16
Erasmus Ivvalu	24	12.63
Louis Tapardjuk	20	10.53
Louisa Iyerak	8	4.21
Eligible voters		572
Total valid ballots		189
Rejected ballots		1
Turnout		33.22%

2025 Nunavut general election: Aggu
Candidate	Votes	%
Joanna Quassa	105	50.00
Erasmus Ivvalu	105	50.00
Eligible voters		533
Total valid ballots		209
Rejected ballots		8
Turnout		40.75%

2021 Nunavut general election: Aggu
Candidate	Votes	%
Joanna Quassa	96	52.8
Methusalah Kunuk	86	47.3
Eligible voters		522
Total valid ballots		182
Rejected ballots		0
Turnout		34.9%

2017 Nunavut general election: Aggu
Candidate	Votes	%
Paul Quassa	106	35.9
Matt Teed	96	32.5
Richard Amarualik	79	26.8
Jerome Sheaves	14	4.7
Eligible voters		472
Total valid ballots		295
Rejected ballots		8
Turnout		62.5%
