= 1992 Northwest Territories jurisdictional boundaries plebiscite =

4 May 1992
- Do you support the boundary for division shown on the map?
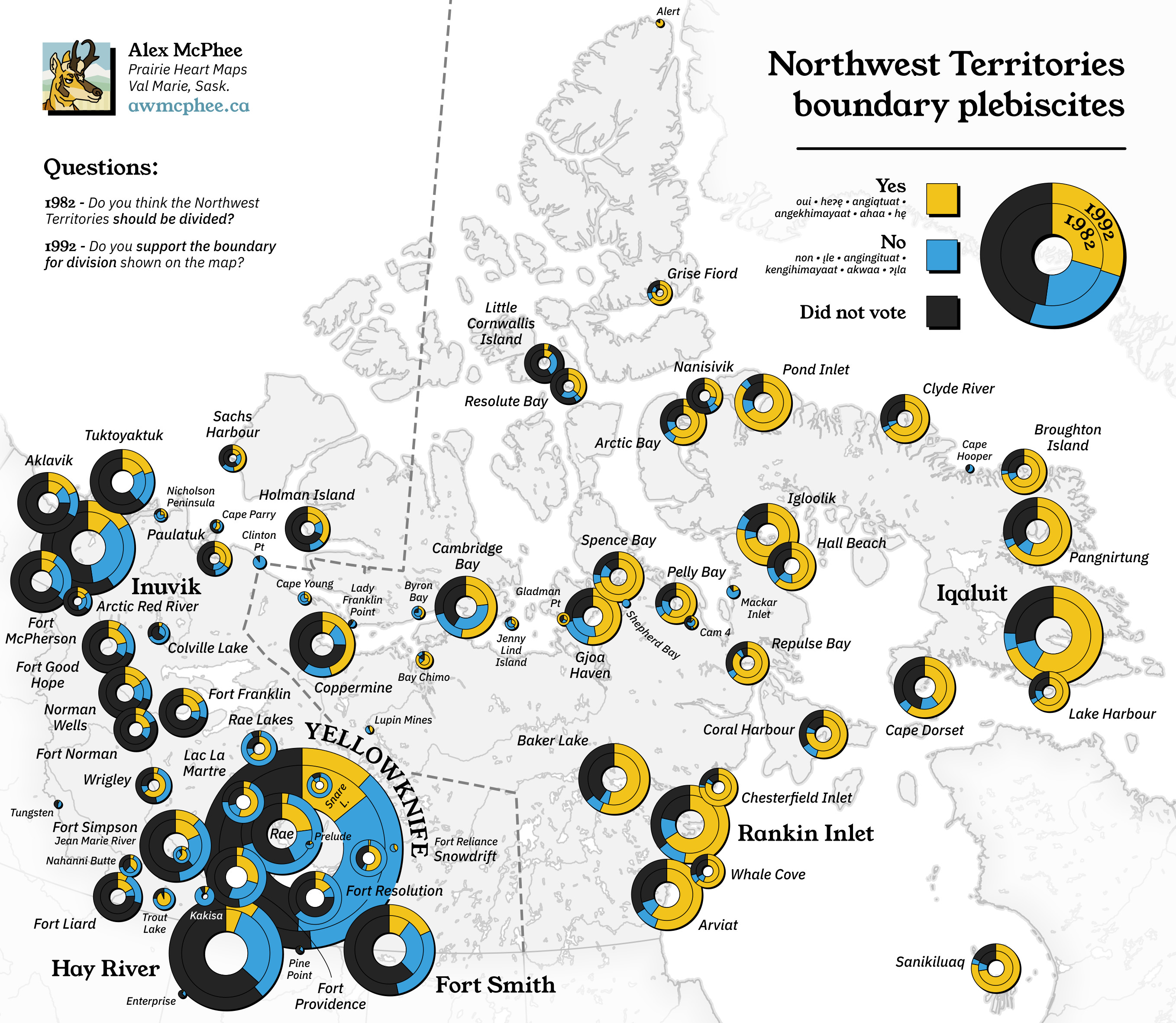
- Map of the 1982 and 1992 plebiscite results

Results
Choice	Votes	%
Yes	8,347	54.39%
No	7,000	45.61%
Valid votes	15,347	99.20%
Invalid or blank votes	124	0.80%
Total votes	15,471	100.00%
Registered voters/turnout	27,852	55.55%

A plebiscite on the boundary between Northwest Territories and the new territory of Nunavut was held in the Northwest Territories on 4 May 1992. The proposed border was approved by 54% of voters. A second referendum later in the year gave the final approval to the creation of the new territory.

== Background ==
A 1982 referendum had approved the division of the Northwest Territories and the creation of a new territory, later to become Nunavut. The federal government gave a conditional agreement to the plan seven months later. In December 1991 the federal government reached an agreement with the Inuit on their land claims, with the "Parker line" (named for former Commissioner John Havelock Parker who worked on establishing the borders) set as the boundary between the existing territory and the new one. The boundary roughly approximates the tree line in Canada.

== Results ==
Choice	Votes	%
For	8,347	54.39
No	7,000	45.61
Invalid/blank votes	124	–
Total	15,471	100
Registered voters/turnout	27,852	55.55
Source: Direct Democracy
