= 1982 Northwest Territories division plebiscite =

1982 referendum creating the Canadian territory of Nunavut

Northwest Territories division plebiscite, 1982
- April 14, 1982
- Do you think the Northwest Territories should be divided?
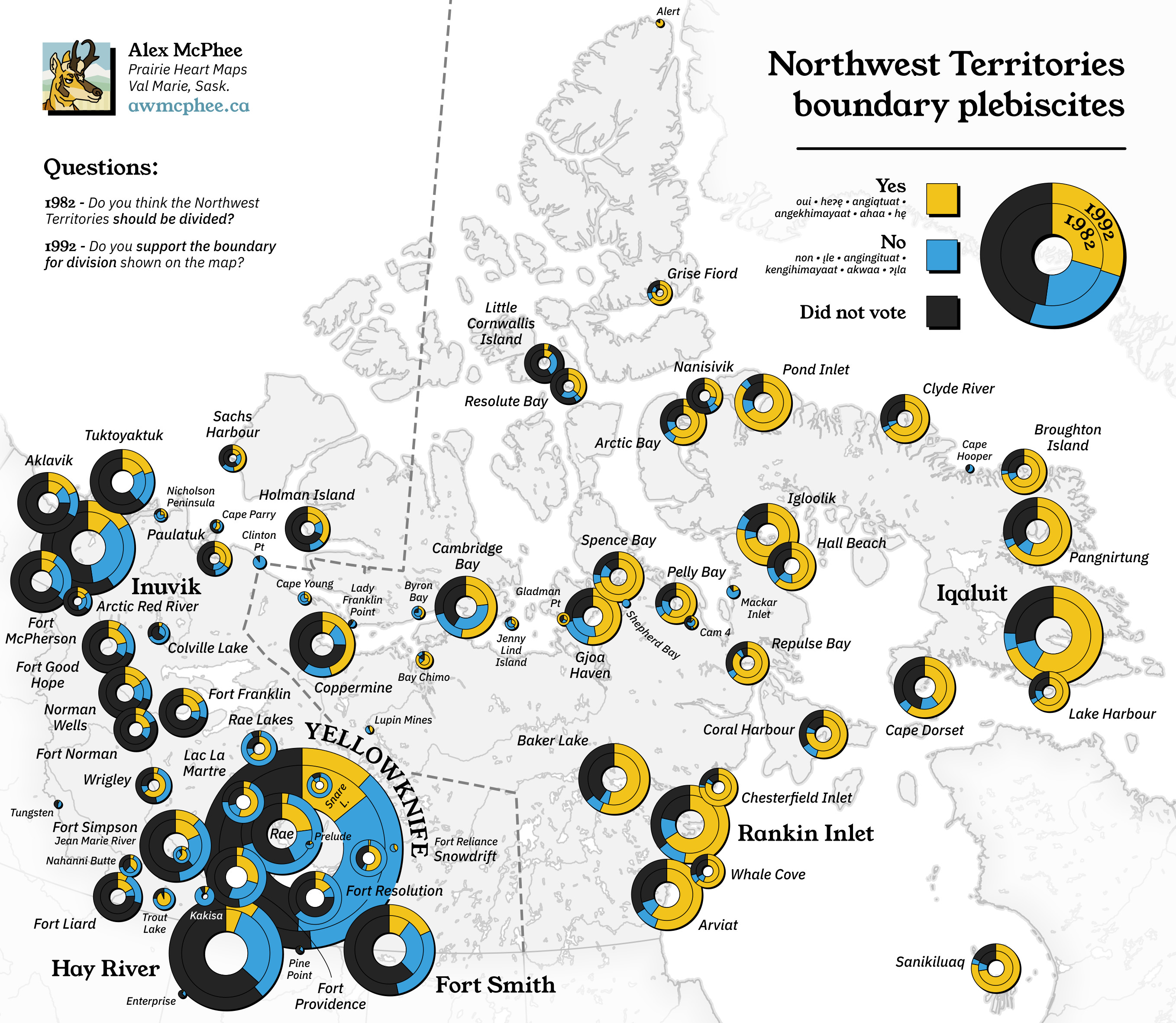
- Map of the 1982 and 1992 plebiscite results
- Website: Report of the Chief Plebiscite Officer on the plebiscite on division of the Northwest Territories 1982

Results
Choice	Votes	%
Yes	5,586	56.48%
No	4,304	43.52%
Valid votes	9,890	98.45%
Invalid or blank votes	156	1.55%
Total votes	10,046	100.00%
Registered voters/turnout		52.99%

The Northwest Territories division plebiscite was a stand-alone, territory-wide plebiscite conducted on April 14, 1982. This was the first territory-wide plebiscite conducted in Northwest Territories history. The results of the plebiscite would eventually lead to the creation of Nunavut, and spawn three other plebiscites during the creation process of the new territory.

== Background ==
The question was a culmination of nearly twenty-five years of debate at the federal and territorial level of government. A bill was tabled in the House of Commons that would have divided the territory in 1963, but it died on the order paper. In 1966 the Carrothers Commission released a report that stated division of the Northwest Territories was not in the best interests of the Territories for the short term.

In the 1967 election a council was elected that was generally opposed to the division. In the late 1970s and in the 1980s a number of proposals were made on how to divide up the territory, and the question was finally put to the voters.

== Results ==
Do you think the Northwest Territories should be divided?

Choice	Votes	%
For	5,586	56.48
No	4,304	43.52
Invalid/blank votes	156	–
Total	10,046	100
Registered voters/turnout	18,957	52.99
Source: Direct Democracy

== Aftermath ==
In the aftermath of the referendum, the Legislative assembly agreed to accept the results, and the Federal government agreed on the following conditions: continued support from the electorate; all parties would agree on a new boundary, all parties would agree on the division of powers between all levels of government, and the settlement of land claims.

This would happen seventeen years later when Nunavut was carved out of the Northwest Territories.

== See also ==
- 1992 Nunavut creation referendum
- Nunavut Land Claims Agreement
