= Carrothers Commission =

Canadian commission on governance

The Carrothers Commission, formally The Advisory Commission on the Development of Government in the Northwest Territories, was a commission set up by the government of Canada to study the future of government of the Northwest Territories. It was led by A.W.R. Carrothers, Dean of law at the University of Western Ontario. The other two members were Jean Beetz, law professor at the University of Montreal and a noted authority on the Canadian Constitution and John Parker, the Mayor of Yellowknife at the time and a mining engineer.

== Background ==
In the early 1960s, many non-Indigenous residents in the Mackenzie District of the territory wanted political reform, namely the division of the Northwest Territories into two separate regions: one in the west (largely populated by white settlers) which would be self-governing, and one in the east (with a mainly Inuit population) which would continue to be ruled by Ottawa.

== Commission ==
The commission was established in April 1963 by the government of Lester B. Pearson. The three-man membership was appointed in 1965. It conducted surveys of opinion in the NWT in 1965 and 1966 and reported in 1966. The views of Indigenous peoples were often ignored and overlooked by the officials conducting the inquiries. One of the aims of the commission was to assimilate nations like the Dene and Inuit into mainstream Canadian society.

== Results ==
Major recommendations included that the seat of government of the territories should be located in the territories (the Northwest Territories Legislative Council was based in the national capital, Ottawa, at the time). Three majority non-Indigenous cities were suggested: Yellowknife, Fort Smith, and Hay River. Yellowknife was selected as the territorial capital. Transfer of many responsibilities from the federal government to that of the territories was recommended and carried out. This included responsibility for education, justice, small business, public works, welfare, lands and resources, social assistance and local government. The commission also reported that while division of the NWT was not advisable at that time, it was in the long term probably desirable and inevitable. These findings eventually led to the creation of Nunavut.

== See also ==
- History of Northwest Territories capital cities
