= Tunngavik Federation of Nunavut =

The Tunngavik Federation of Nunavut (TFN, Inuktitut: ᓄᓇᕗᑦ ᑐᙵᕕᒃ, Nunavut Tunngavik) was the organization officially recognized from 1982 to 1993 as representing the Inuit of what is now Nunavut, but was then part of the Northwest Territories, for the purpose of negotiating treaties and land claims settlements. In this role, it replaced the Inuit Tapiriit Kanatami, which represents Inuit across Canada, and has been superseded by Nunavut Tunngavik Incorporated.

The Inuit began to emerge as a political force in the late 1960s and early 1970s with the struggle for control over natural resources. This was a real wake-up call for Inuit, and it stimulated the emergence of a new generation of young Inuit activists in the late 1960s. They began networking with one another across the Northwest Territories, Quebec and Labrador and in 1982, the Tunngavik Federation of Nunavut, or "TFN" had been incorporated to take over the claim negotiation mandate from the Inuit Tapiriit Kanatami. TFN worked for ten years and, in September 1992, came to a final agreement with the government of Canada. Then, in November 1992, the Nunavut Final Agreement was approved by nearly 85% of Nunavut Inuit. As the final step in this long process, the Nunavut Land Claims Agreement was signed on May 25, 1993 in Iqaluit by the Prime Minister Brian Mulroney and by Paul Quassa, the president of Nunavut Tunngavik Incorporated, which replaced the TFN upon the ratification of the Nunavut Final Agreement. The Canadian Parliament passed the supporting legislation in June of the same year, enabling the eventual establishment of Nunavut as a territorial entity. The land claims agreement was the result of two decades of negotiations that, in the end, gave birth to the largest comprehensive land claims settlement in Canada.
