= Nunavut Land Claims Agreement =

Canadian agreement between the Inuit and Government

The Nunavut Land Claims Agreement (NCLA, French: L'Accord sur les revendications territoriales du Nunavut) was signed on May 25, 1993, in Iqaluit, by representatives of the Tunngavik Federation of Nunavut (now Nunavut Tunngavik Incorporated), the Government of Canada and the Government of the Northwest Territories. This agreement gave the Inuit of the central and eastern Northwest Territories a separate territory called Nunavut. It is the largest Aboriginal land claim settlement in Canadian history.

The NLCA consists of 42 chapters, which address a broad range of political and environmental rights and concerns including wildlife management and harvesting rights, land, water and environmental management regimes, parks and conservation areas, heritage resources, public sector employment and contracting, and a range of other issues. The agreement defines two geographic areas covered by the agreement: the first consists of the Arctic Archipelago and the mainland eastern Arctic, and their adjacent marine areas; the second includes the Belcher Islands, and associated islands and adjacent marine areas.

== Benefits ==
- Equal representation of Inuit with the government on a new set of wildlife management, resource management and environmental boards;
- In addition to creating management and advisory groups, and making various financial considerations, the NLCA gave the Inuit of Nunavut title to approximately 350,000 km^{2} (140,000 sq mi) of land, of which, 35,257 km^{2} (13,613 sq mi) include mineral rights;
- The right to harvest wildlife on lands and waters throughout the Nunavut settlement area;
- A share of federal government royalties from oil, gas and mineral development on Crown lands;
- The right to negotiate with industry for economic and social benefits from the development of non-renewable resources on Inuit Owned Lands;
- The creation of three federally funded national parks;
- Capital transfer payments of $1.9 billion over 15 years and a $13 million Training Trust Fund for the establishment of the Government of Nunavut;

== History ==
In 1973 the Inuit Tapirisat of Canada (ITC) began research on Inuit land use and occupancy in the Arctic. Three years later in 1976, ITC proposed creating a Nunavut Territory and the federal Electoral Boundaries Commission recommended dividing the Northwest Territories into two electoral districts: the Western Arctic (now the Northwest Territories) and Nunatsiaq (now Nunavut).

In 1982 the Tunngavik Federation of Nunavut (TFN) negotiated the land claims agreement with the federal government. Voting in the Northwest Territories determined the creation of Nunavut with a passing vote of 56%. The TFN and representatives from the federal and territorial governments signed the land claims agreement-in-principle in 1990.

In 1992 the TFN and federal negotiators agreed on the substantive portions of the Nunavut Land Claims Agreement. On May 25, 1993, Paul Quassa, president of the Tunngavik Federation of Nunavut; Brian Mulroney, Prime Minister of Canada; and Tom Siddon, Minister of Indian & Northern Affairs, signed the Nunavut Land Claims Agreement. On July 9, 1993 the Nunavut Land Claims Agreement and Nunavut Act were adopted by the Parliament of Canada and received Royal Assent. In 1998, amendments to the Nunavut Act were adopted by parliament and received Royal Assent. In 1999 on April 1, Nunavut was established with an independent government.

== Amendments ==
Since the NLCA was signed in 1993, amendments have been implemented. The major amendments in 1995 and 1996 were alterations to different official event dates. Articles 5.4.2, 5.6.25, 8.2.2, 8.2.3, and 35.5.7 of the Nunavut Land Claims Agreement were changed. On March 1, 2002, schedule 29-3 (negotiation loans payment) of the Nunavut Land Claims Agreement was replaced.
