= Human Rights Act (Nunavut) =

Human rights legislation in Nunavut

Legislature of Nunavut
- Citation: SNu 2003, c 12
- Enacted by: Legislature of Nunavut
- Assented to: November 5, 2003
- Commenced: November 5, 2004

Repeals
- Fair Practices Act, RSNWT 1988, c. F-2 (as in force in Nunavut)

The Human Rights Act (French: Loi sur les droits de la personne) is a law passed by the Legislature of the territory of Nunavut, located in the northern regions of Canada. The act is similar to the human rights laws passed by the Parliament of Canada and the provinces and other territories, but is unique in incorporating traditional Inuit teachings, known as Inuit Qaujimajatuqangit, as a guiding principle of the legislation. The act is also consistent with the Nunavut Land Claims Agreement. The act ended Nunavut's status as the only jurisdiction in Canada at that time without human rights protections for gay, lesbian and bisexual residents.

== Legislative background ==
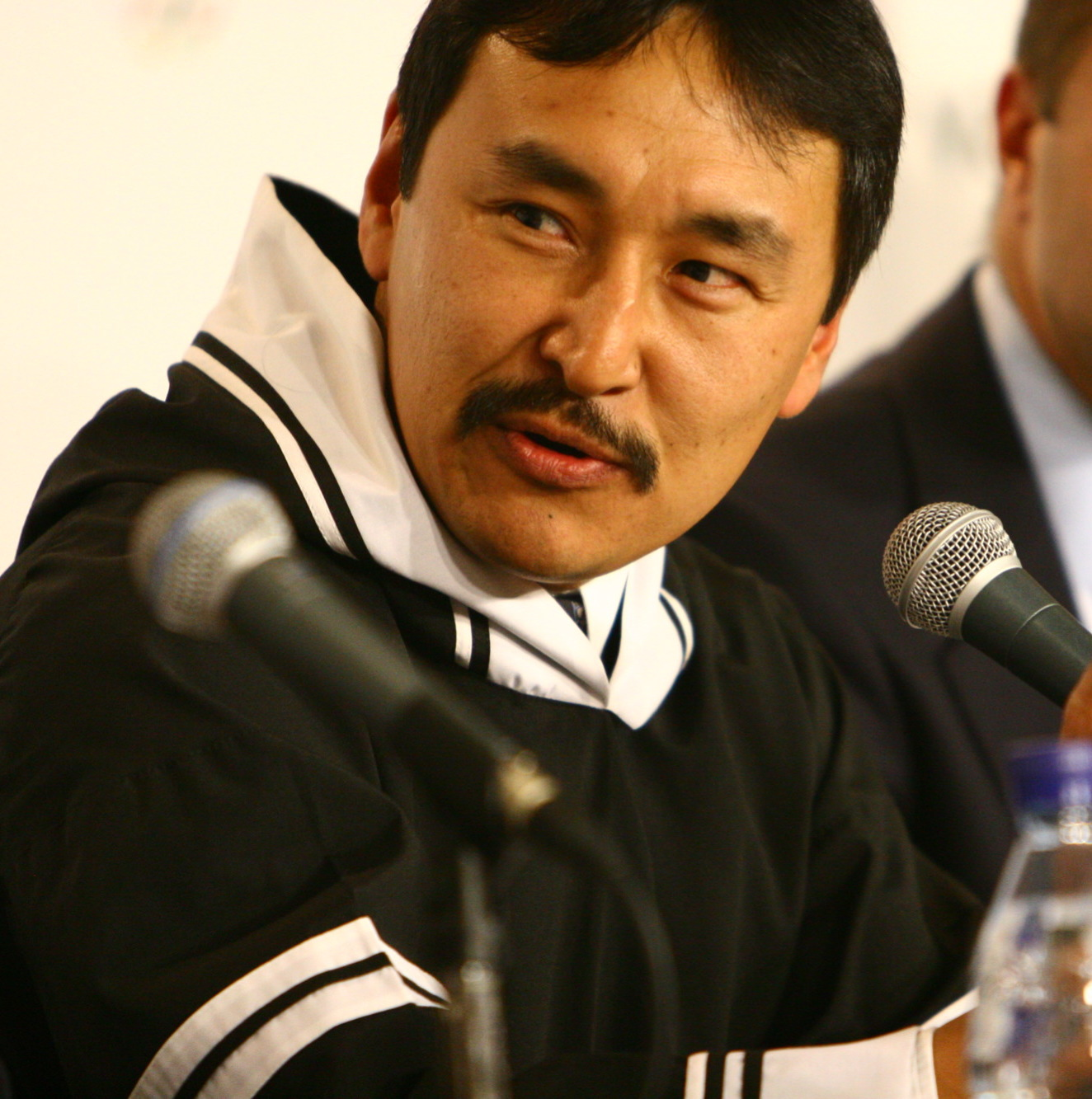
Premier Paul Okalik, who introduced the Human Rights Act

Prior to 1999, Nunavut was the eastern portion of the Northwest Territories. On April 1, 1999, the federal Nunavut Act came into force, creating the new territory of Nunavut, separate from the Northwest Territories. Under that federal statute, the laws of the Northwest Territories continued in force in Nunavut, until altered by the Legislature of Nunavut. That meant that the Fair Practices Act of the Northwest Territories, a more limited type of human rights legislation, continued to be in force in Nunavut, and could only be changed by the Nunavut Legislature.

Premier Paul Okalik introduced the bill to enact the Human Rights Act in the Legislative Assembly on October 31, 2002, giving his government's basis for the proposed legislation. He explained that at that time, the Canadian Human Rights Act applied to matters within Nunavut. By enacting their own Nunavut Human Rights Act, the federal legislation would no longer apply as broadly, being replaced by the Nunavut legislation, and the people of Nunavut would achieve greater self-government. The bill passed third reading in the Assembly on November 4, 2003, by a vote of 10–8, and received assent from Piita Irniq, the Commissioner of Nunavut, on November 5, 2003.

Some provisions of the act which were needed to set up the administrative framework of the new system came into force on assent, while the rest of the act came into force a year later, on November 5, 2004. The act repealed the Northwest Territories Fair Practices Act, to the extent that act applied in Nunavut. As well, the Canadian Human Rights Act now had reduced application within Nunavut, and did not apply to matters covered by the territorial legislation.

== Provisions of the act ==
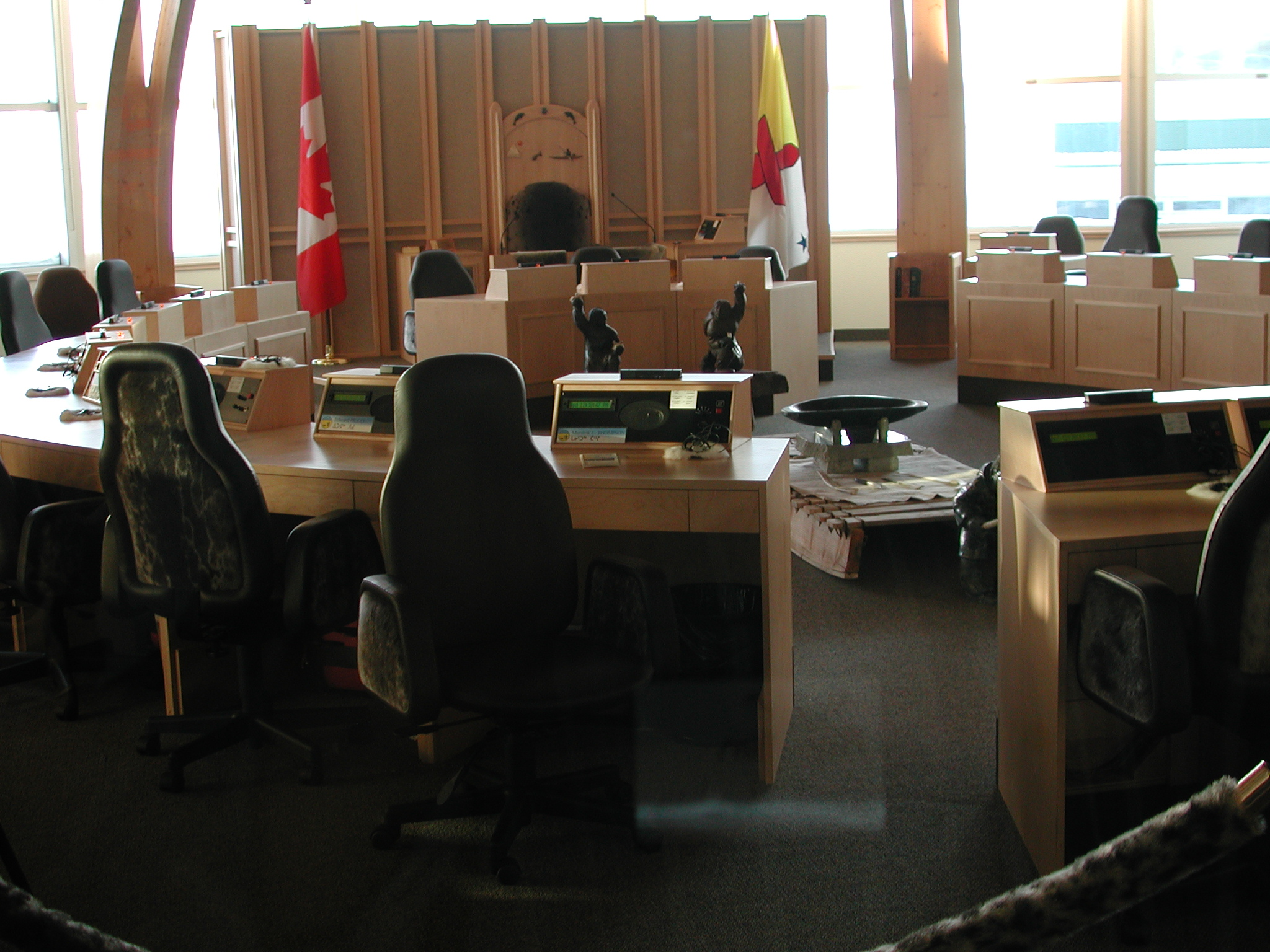
Chamber of the Legislative Assembly

=== General framework ===
The act begins with a general purpose clause:

... within the framework of Inuit Qaujimajatuqangit that the Government, all public agencies, boards and commissions and all persons in Nunavut have the responsibility to guarantee that every individual in Nunavut is afforded an equal opportunity to enjoy a full and productive life and that failure to provide equality of opportunity threatens the development and well-being of all persons in the community.

Inuit Qaujimajatuqangit is a term referring to "Inuit traditional knowledge", "Inuit traditional institutions" or "Inuit traditional technology", and is sometimes abbreviated as "IQ". Including IQ as a guiding principle of the Human Rights Act is a unique feature of human rights in Nunavut, not found in any other human rights legislation in Canada.

The act then explicitly states that it does not affect any protections set out in the Nunavut Land Claims Agreement, which is the framework setting out the relationships between the people and territory of Nunavut, and the federal government. In his presentation to the Legislative Assembly, Okalik made this point very clear: "This is to enhance and further protect what is already included in the Nunavut Land Claims Agreement. ... This is protecting the Inuit rights outlined in the Nunavut Land Claims Agreement. It is not going to obligate or barricade any existing aboriginal or treaty rights of Inuit."

Similarly, the act provides that nothing in it abrogates or derogates from treaty or Indigenous rights protected by section 35 of the Constitution Act, 1982.

The act then provides that it generally takes priority over all other Nunavut legislation, and that it binds the government of Nunavut itself. This type of clause establishes that the Human Rights Act is quasi-constitutional in nature, because its goal is to protect the basic rights of individuals.

=== Prohibited grounds of discrimination ===
The act then sets out a list of prohibited grounds of discrimination:

- race
- colour
- ancestry
- ethnic origin
- citizenship
- place of origin
- creed
- religion
- age
- disability
- sex
- sexual orientation
- marital status
- family status
- pregnancy
- lawful source of income
- a conviction for which a pardon has been granted.

These prohibited grounds of discrimination apply in a wide range of daily activities, such as employment, housing, membership in organizations, and publications such as job advertisements. The act also makes it unlawful to harass another person on the basis of such grounds or publish any material expressing discrimination or implying discrimination against an individual or class of individuals.

=== Enforcement ===
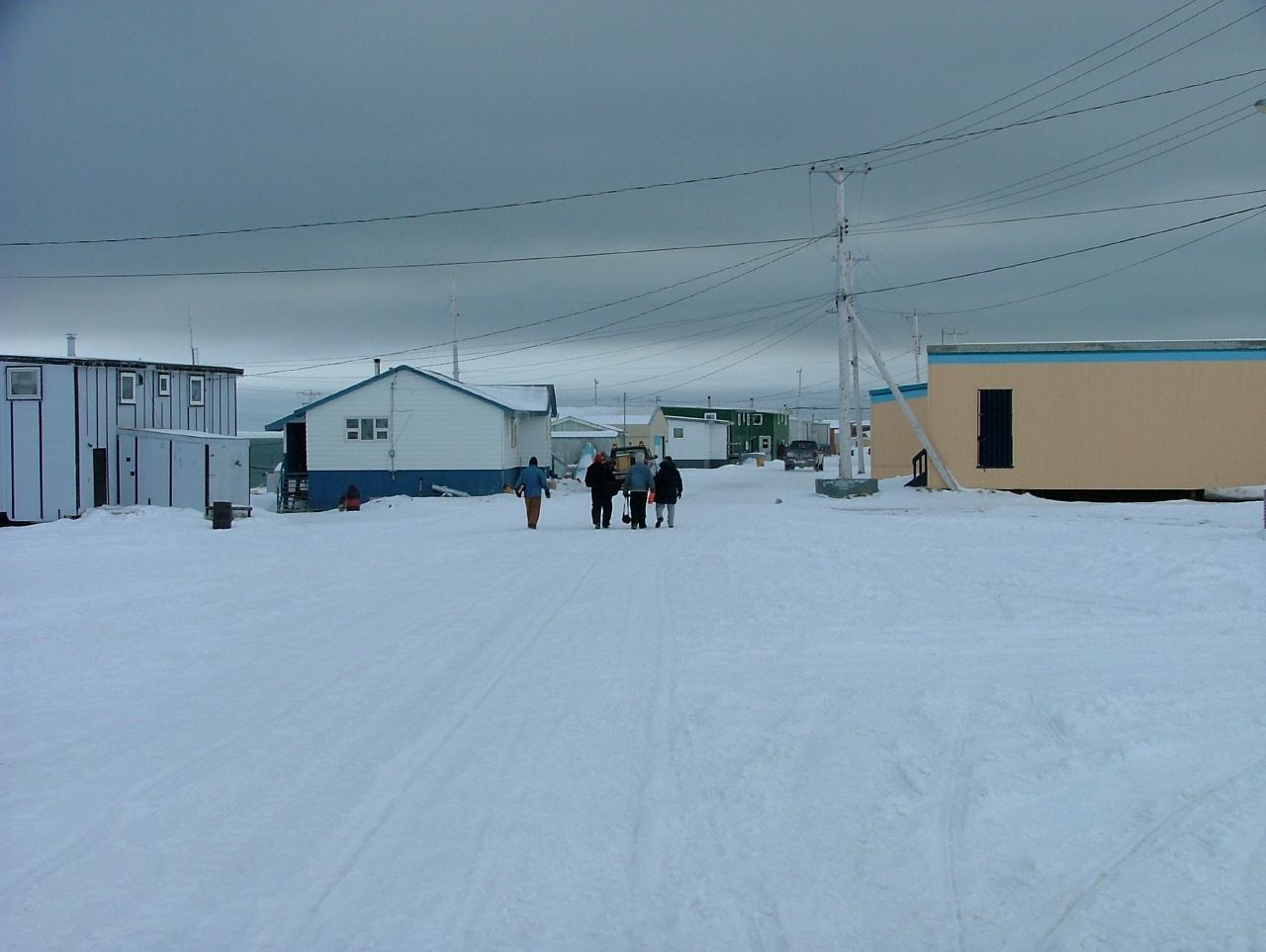
Coral Harbour, location of the Nunavut Human Rights Tribunal

Enforcement of the act is done by the Nunavut Human Rights Tribunal, located in Coral Harbour. Members of the Tribunal are appointed by the territorial Cabinet to serve a term of four years each. Terms may be renewed by the Cabinet, with no term limit.

Any person who believes their rights under the act have been infringed by the government or a private party may file a notification with the Tribunal within two years of any alleged contravention of the act. The Tribunal has extensive powers to investigate and to seek resolution of the dispute by mediation. If the matter cannot be settled, the Tribunal may conduct a hearing. If it concludes the complaint is substantiated, the Tribunal has extensive remedial powers and can issue orders against a party in breach of the act. Such orders are binding on a person in the same way as court orders.

A party who is dissatisfied with a decision of the Tribunal can appeal it to the Nunavut Court of Justice.

== Sexual orientation controversy ==
The proposed Human Rights Act attracted criticism from both progressives and conservatives prior to its passage. Progressives were disappointed that the bill, unlike similar legislation in the Northwest Territories, did not recognise gender identity as a protected ground. More conservative MLAs, on the other hand, attempted to remove references to sexual orientation as a protected ground in the bill.

On the night the bill was passed into law, Patterk Netser, the member for Nanulik, moved to strike the words "sexual orientation" from the list of protected grounds, as many members had concerns that the bill would contribute to the adoption of same-sex marriage in Nunavut. According to Premier Okalik, if this motion had passed, the federal government would not have provided Nunavut's Human Rights Tribunal with the ability to adjudicate disputes; protection of gay, lesbian and bisexual Nunavummiut was a condition of the government granting this ability. Opponents of this motion argued that such an action would violate section 15 of the Canadian Charter of Rights and Freedoms. They referred to the Vriend decision of the Supreme Court of Canada, in which the Supreme Court read protection from discrimination on the grounds of sexual orientation into similar Alberta legislation. The Court held that omitting sexual orientation from a comprehensive human rights statute would be discriminatory, contrary to the Charter. The motion failed in the Legislative Assembly on the night of the bill's passage with six in favour, nine opposed and one abstention.

The day after the passage of the law, a spokeswoman for Iqaluit Pride & Friends of Pride, an LGBTQ advocacy organisation, expressed disappointment that the Act did not include any reference to gender identity to protect transgender people from discrimination. While the group acknowledged that courts had already recognised transgender people as protected from discrimination under the grounds of sex, the spokeswoman pointed to similar legislation enacted in the Northwest Territories that referred to gender identity as a model.

== See also ==
- LGBTQ rights in Canada
- Inuit culture
