= Steve Mapsalak =

Canadian politician (1957–2025)

Member of the Legislative Assembly of Nunavut for Aivilik
- In office October 28, 2013 – September 24, 2017
- Preceded by: Riding Established
- Succeeded by: Patterk Netser

Member of the Legislative Assembly of Nunavut for Akulliq
- In office February 16, 2004 – October 27, 2008
- Preceded by: Ovide Alakannuark
- Succeeded by: John Ningark

Personal details
- Born: March 17, 1957 Repulse Bay, Northwest Territories (now Naujaat, Nunavut), Canada
- Died: April 16, 2025 (aged 68)
- Party: non-partisan consensus government

Steve Mapsalak (March 17, 1957 – April 16, 2025) was a Canadian politician, who served as a Member of the Legislative Assembly (MLA) in the Legislative Assembly of Nunavut.

== Life and career ==
Mapsalak first won the Akulliq seat in the 2004 Nunavut election.

According to preliminary results, he was narrowly defeated by John Ningark in the 2008 election. A judicial recount was conducted, but resulted in Ningark and Mapsalak each receiving exactly 157 votes, thus forcing a new vote. In the revote on March 2, Ningark defeated Mapsalak by a margin of 193 to 179.

In the 2013 election, Mapsalak was re-elected to the legislature, defeating Johnny Ningeongan in the redistributed district of Aivilik. Mapsalak was previously the mayor of Repulse Bay, and also the chair of the board of governors for Nunavut Arctic College.

Mapsalak died on April 16, 2025, at the age of 68.
