= Tarralik Duffy =

Inuit multimedia artist

Tarralik Duffy (born in 1979) is an Inuk multimedia artist from Coral Harbour (Salliq), in Nunavut, Canada. She currently resides primarily in Saskatoon, Saskatchewan, as of 2021, but continues to split her time between Saskatoon and Coral Harbour. She works with various mediums and techniques, including sculpture, drawing, photography, textiles, printmaking, digital mediums, writing, and music. Her early life inspired elements of her artistic career, resulting in a variety of visual art pieces and publications that have also been recognized through exhibitions and awards.

Variations of Tarralik Duffy are the names Adina Applebum and Adina Tarralik Duffy.

== Early life ==
Duffy was born in Coral Harbour, where she lived with her parents, Leonie and Ron Duffy. Her parents have owned and operated a hotel called Leonie's Place in Coral Harbour since the 1980s.

She first began taking an interest in art by drawing with her older sister. However, she stated she has always wanted to be an artist. At the beginning of her career, she found it challenging to commit due to personal reasons; however, she drew strength from the support of others and the encouragement to commit to her ideas fully.

== Artistic career ==
Tarralik is inspired by her family, specifically her sister, father, and grandmother. She states that her father taught her to play with language and not to take it too seriously, which has influenced many of her artworks to be a play on words. Furthermore, she drew inspiration from her grandmother's cooking, clothing and the time they spent together. She started a design company called Ugly Fish as an homage to her grandmother, whose Inuktitut nickname, Kanajuq, translates to "ugly fish."

Duffy stated that much of her art helps her reconnect and strengthen her relationship with her culture, which she felt she had not truly appreciated when she was younger and was rejected for a time as she grew older. Many of her pieces are inspired by the products she saw during her childhood, such as those in her home and the Quickstop (Northern Store) convenience stores in Nunavut. Many of the products depicted in Duffy's art are not of Indigenous origin but are deeply rooted in the culture and daily lives of Inuit. She also incorporates Inuktitut syllabics in her pieces to help preserve and commemorate the beauty of the language.

Duffy has stated that much of her inspiration for her jewelry pieces comes from time spent on beaches, such as seeing the bones of belugas, for example, and finding them beautiful rather than disgusting. Furthermore, she states that she finds beauty in mundane things, such as pop cans, which feature in her art.

== Major works ==
=== Visual art ===
- Jerry Cans (2023) - Jerry Cans is a soft sculpture of a red plastic gas can (Jerrycan), commonly used and seen throughout Coral Harbour. The piece is intended to represent finding the beauty in everyday objects and serves as a reminder of home.
- Black Gold (2021) - Black gold is another pop art style digital illustration piece featuring China Lily soy sauce bottles in a repeating grid pattern meant to represent the bottles on store shelves in Nunavut. One element of inspiration for this piece includes cultural and shared nostalgia.
- Inuit Pop Art (2015) - In various media and works, Duffy features a Pepsi-like pop can that, instead of Pepsi, features the word pipsi (ᐱᑉᓯ) in Inuktitut syllabics. The work is a play on words on multiple levels, as the style is pop art, and it features a pop can, and pipsi means dried fish, particularly char, in Inuktitut combining multiple elements of culture and her inspiration in everyday objects.

=== Publications ===
- Don't Cry Over Spilled Beads (2014) - This is a short nonfiction story about the moments she shared with her grandmother over her lifetime. It touches on elements of Duffy's grief, love, body image, and, ultimately, the lessons of her grandmother.

== Exhibitions and distinctions ==
=== Exhibitions (solo and collective) ===
- Tarralik Duffy: Let's Go Quickstop exhibition, at the Art Gallery of Ontario in 2023.
- Gasoline Rainbows exhibition at the Winnipeg Art Gallery in 2023.

=== Distinctions ===
- 2021 recipient of the "Kenojuak Ashevak Memorial Award".
- In 2014, she received the "Sally Manning Award for Aboriginal Creative Nonfiction" for her piece Don't Cry Over Spilled Beads.
- In 2018, she received the "Best Canadian Essays Publication Award" for her essay titled Uvanga/Self: Picturing Our Identity.
