= Ovide Alakannuark =

Canadian politician (1938–2019)

MLA for Akulliq
- In office 1999–2004
- Succeeded by: Steve Mapsalak

Personal details
- Born: December 25, 1938 Pelly Bay, Northwest Territories, Canada
- Died: October 7, 2019 (aged 80) Kugaaruk, Nunavut, Canada
- Party: non-partisan consensus government

Ovide Alakannuark (December 25, 1938 – October 7, 2019) was a Canadian territorial level politician from Pelly Bay, Northwest Territories (now Kugaaruk, Nunavut). He served as a member of the Legislative Assembly of Nunavut from 1999 until 2004.

Alakannuark was elected in the 1999 Nunavut general election. He defeated candidate Steve Mapsalak by just 25 votes to win the Akulliq electoral district. He only served a single term in the Legislature deciding not to run for re-election when it was dissolved in 2004.

He attempted a return to politics running in rerun for the Akulliq district finishing a distant third on March 2, 2009. The two front runners Steve Mapsalak and John Ningark had also served as MLAs in the Nunavut Legislature. He died on October 7, 2019, at the age of 80.
