= Solomon Malliki =

Canadian politician

Member of the Legislative Assembly of Nunavut for Aivilik
- In office November 19, 2021 – October 27, 2025
- Preceded by: Patterk Netser
- Succeeded by: Hannah Angootealuk

Personal details
- Party: non-partisan consensus government

Solomon Malliki is a Canadian Inuk politician, who was elected to the Legislative Assembly of Nunavut in the 2021 Nunavut general election. He represented the electoral district of Aivilik until his defeat in 2025.

In November 2024, Malliki brought a motion of no confidence against the premiership of P.J. Akeeagok, alleging that Akeeagok was uncommunicative with MLAs and had fostered a "toxic environment" in the legislature. Akeeagok survived the non-confidence vote 10 to 8, receiving support from all of the cabinet and three regular MLAs.
