= Johnny Ningeongan =

Canadian politician

MLA for Nanulik
- In office 2008–2013
- Preceded by: Patterk Netser
- Succeeded by: riding redistributed

Personal details
- Party: non-partisan consensus government

Johnny Ningeongan is a Canadian politician, who was elected as the Member of the Legislative Assembly for the electoral district of Nanulik in the Legislative Assembly of Nunavut in the 2008 territorial election. He was defeated in the 2013 election in the redistributed district of Aivilik.

Prior to his election to the legislature, Ningeongan served five terms as mayor of Coral Harbour and one term as president of the Nunavut Federation of Municipalities.
