= Hannah Angootealuk =

Canadian politician

Hannah Angootealuk MLA

Member of the Legislative Assembly of Nunavut for Aivilik
- Incumbent
- Assumed office October 27, 2025
- Preceded by: Solomon Malliki

Personal details
- Party: Non-partisan consensus government

Hannah Angootealuk is a Canadian politician, who was elected to the Legislative Assembly of Nunavut in the 2025 Nunavut general election. She represents the electoral district of Aivilik.

Angootealuk is a resident of Coral Harbour. She is a mother of 5 and a grandmother of 20.
