= South Bay (Nunavut) =

Bay in Nunavut, Canada

- Location within Nunavut
- Location: Hudson Bay
- Coordinates: 63°58′N 83°30′W
- River sources: Kirchoffer River
- Ocean/sea sources: Arctic Ocean
- Basin countries: Canada
- Settlements: Coral Harbour

South Bay is a waterway in the Kivalliq Region, Nunavut, Canada. It is located in Hudson Bay, off southwestern Southampton Island. It is west of Native Bay. The Kirchoffer River empties into the bay.

== Coral Harbour ==
The small Inuit community of Coral Harbour is located on the bay's northern shore, 25.9 km (16.1 mi) from the mouth of the bay. The bay is notable for its fossilized coral which lends its name to the community.

== Climate ==
Climate data is from Coral Harbour.

The area has a severe subarctic climate (Köppen Dfc), for which it just qualifies due to its 10 °C (50 °F) July means. It is a borderline polar climate, which results in barren vegetation. Coral Harbour has never gone above freezing in January, February and March (although the latter has recorded 0.0 °C (32.0 °F)). Due to the frozen nature of Hudson Bay, there is a severe seasonal lag until June despite much sunshine and perpetual twilight at night. Due to the drop of solar strength and the absence of warm water even in summer, temperatures still drop off very fast as September approaches, with only July and August having ever recorded temperatures above 24 °C (75 °F). Cold extremes are severe, but in line with many areas even farther south in Canada's interior. Unlike those areas, Coral Harbour remains beneath −25 °C (−13 °F) in terms of average high in the midst of winter.

Throughout December 2010 and early January 2011, Nunavut, northern Quebec and western Greenland set many high temperature records. In Coral Harbour, a high of 3.3 °C (37.9 °F) in mid-December broke the old record of 1.7 °C (35.1 °F) set in 1963. The daily minimum temperature on 6 January 2011, was about 30 °C (54 °F) warmer than normal. The unusual warmth was due largely to an unseasonal area of high pressure over Greenland, and very negative values of the Arctic oscillation and North Atlantic oscillation. Mostly in the 21st century, the conditions have combined to produce an Arctic dipole anomaly that brings warm air to the Arctic regions and cold air to the continents.

Climate data for Coral Harbour (Coral Harbour Airport) WMO ID: 71915; coordinates 64°11′36″N 83°21′34″W; elevation: 62.2 m (204 ft); 1991–2020 normals, extremes 1933−present
Month	Jan	Feb	Mar	Apr	May	Jun	Jul	Aug	Sep	Oct	Nov	Dec	Year
Record high humidex	0.2	−1.9	−0.5	4.4	8.9	23.1	32.8	30.1	19.9	7.6	3.7	3.2	32.8
Record high °C (°F)	0.6 (33.1)	−1.1 (30.0)	0.0 (32.0)	5.0 (41.0)	9.4 (48.9)	23.5 (74.3)	28.0 (82.4)	26.1 (79.0)	18.5 (65.3)	7.6 (45.7)	4.0 (39.2)	3.4 (38.1)	28.0 (82.4)
Mean daily maximum °C (°F)	−24.9 (−12.8)	−25.6 (−14.1)	−20.2 (−4.4)	−11.0 (12.2)	−2.5 (27.5)	6.9 (44.4)	14.8 (58.6)	12.1 (53.8)	4.8 (40.6)	−2.5 (27.5)	−11.2 (11.8)	−19.2 (−2.6)	−6.5 (20.3)
Daily mean °C (°F)	−29.0 (−20.2)	−29.7 (−21.5)	−24.9 (−12.8)	−16.1 (3.0)	−6.0 (21.2)	3.5 (38.3)	10.2 (50.4)	8.2 (46.8)	2.0 (35.6)	−5.5 (22.1)	−15.5 (4.1)	−23.4 (−10.1)	−10.5 (13.1)
Mean daily minimum °C (°F)	−33.2 (−27.8)	−33.7 (−28.7)	−29.7 (−21.5)	−21.1 (−6.0)	−9.6 (14.7)	0.1 (32.2)	5.6 (42.1)	4.2 (39.6)	−0.8 (30.6)	−8.6 (16.5)	−19.8 (−3.6)	−27.6 (−17.7)	−14.5 (5.9)
Record low °C (°F)	−52.8 (−63.0)	−51.4 (−60.5)	−49.4 (−56.9)	−39.4 (−38.9)	−31.1 (−24.0)	−15.6 (3.9)	−1.1 (30.0)	−3.3 (26.1)	−17.2 (1.0)	−34.4 (−29.9)	−40.6 (−41.1)	−48.9 (−56.0)	−52.8 (−63.0)
Record low wind chill	−69.5	−69.3	−64.3	−55.1	−39.7	−23.2	−8.2	−11.8	−23.7	−43.7	−54.8	−64.2	−69.5
Average precipitation mm (inches)	10.9 (0.43)	—	9.6 (0.38)	18.2 (0.72)	19.9 (0.78)	28.0 (1.10)	34.8 (1.37)	61.7 (2.43)	44.9 (1.77)	36.6 (1.44)	23.3 (0.92)	—	—
Average rainfall mm (inches)	0.0 (0.0)	—	0.0 (0.0)	0.5 (0.02)	5.4 (0.21)	22.6 (0.89)	34.8 (1.37)	61.4 (2.42)	35.6 (1.40)	8.4 (0.33)	0.3 (0.01)	—	—
Average snowfall cm (inches)	—	11.2 (4.4)	—	9.6 (3.8)	18.1 (7.1)	14.8 (5.8)	5.4 (2.1)	0.0 (0.0)	0.0 (0.0)	7.8 (3.1)	28.1 (11.1)	22.9 (9.0)	—
Average precipitation days (≥ 0.2 mm)	9.4	—	8.7	9.7	10.6	10.2	9.8	13.0	12.0	15.4	14.0	—	—
Average rainy days (≥ 0.2 mm)	0.0	—	0.06	0.13	2.2	7.9	9.8	13.0	8.6	4.0	0.55	—	—
Average snowy days (≥ 0.2 cm)	9.2	—	8.7	9.7	9.4	3.4	0.0	0.0	4.1	14.0	13.4	—	—
Average relative humidity (%) (at 1500 LST)	67.4	66.4	69.2	74.5	80.3	73.1	62.8	69.1	75.8	85.5	79.7	72.0	73.0
Mean monthly sunshine hours	37.9	112.1	187.4	240.2	239.9	262.2	312.3	220.4	109.8	70.8	47.9	18.8	1,859.7
Percentage possible sunshine	22.4	47.0	51.6	53.2	42.0	41.9	51.2	43.3	27.9	23.3	24.3	13.9	36.8
Source: Environment and Climate Change Canada (sun 1981–2010)
