= Patterk Netser =

Canadian Inuk politician

Patterk Netser MLA

Member of the Legislative Assembly of Nunavut for Aivilik
- In office October 30, 2017 – September 20, 2021
- Preceded by: Steve Mapsalak
- Succeeded by: Solomon Malliki

Member of the Legislative Assembly of Nunavut for Nanulik
- In office September 2003 – October 27, 2008
- Preceded by: James Arvaluk
- Succeeded by: Johnny Ningeongan

Personal details
- Born: Coral Harbour, Nunavut
- Party: Non-partisan consensus government (territorial); Conservative (federal)

Patterk Netser is a Canadian Inuk politician, who was the Member of the Legislative Assembly for the electoral district of Nanulik in the Legislative Assembly of Nunavut from 2003 to 2008, and was reelected to the legislature in 2017 to represent the new district of Aivilik. He was stripped of his ministerial portfolios after sharing his anti-Black Lives Matter and anti-abortion views on Facebook in mid-to late 2020.

Netser was born in Coral Harbour, Nunavut. Prior to becoming an MLA, Netser was involved in local and territorial education as a member of the Coral Harbour District Education Authority and the regional education board.

Nester was elected to the 1st Nunavut Legislature in a by-election in September 2003. During the fall sitting, the Assembly debated the proposed Human Rights Act 2003. Sexual orientation was one of the prohibited grounds of discrimination in the proposed act. Nestor opposed the inclusion of sexual orientation, and brought a motion to strike the category from the bill. The Assembly rejected his motion, with six in favour, nine opposed and one abstention.

During the 5th Nunavut Legislature, Netser was named Minister responsible for the Nunavut Housing Corporation and Nunavut Arctic College.

In early October 2020, Netser made a controversial Facebook post about abortion and the Black Lives Matter movement. Shortly afterwards, Premier Joe Savikataaq stripped Netser of all his portfolios. Due to Nunavut's non-partisan consensus government, the composition of Cabinet is determined by a vote of all members, and Netser was not formally removed from the Cabinet of Nunavut until October 23, 2020. Fourteen members voted for Netser's removal, three against (including Netser himself), and one abstaining. Three additional MLAs were not present at the sitting.

== Federal politics ==
Netser is affiliated with the federal Conservative Party. He endorsed Leslyn Lewis in the 2020 leadership election.
