= Aivilik =

Territorial electoral district in Nunavut, Canada

Coordinates: 65.144°N 85.139°W

Nunavut electoral district
- Boundaries of Aivilik

Territorial electoral district
- Legislature: Legislative Assembly of Nunavut
MLA
Hannah Angootealuk
- District created: 2013
- First contested: 2013
- Last contested: 2025

Aivilik (Inuktitut: ᐊᐃᕕᓕᒃ) is a territorial electoral district (riding) for the Legislative Assembly of Nunavut, Canada. The riding consists of the communities of Naujaat (formerly Repulse Bay) and Coral Harbour. The district was created prior to the 28 October 2013 general election. The communities were previously in Akulliq and Nanulik.

== Members of the Legislative Assembly ==
Parliament	Years	Member
4th	2013–2017	Steve Mapsalak
5th	2017–2021	Patterk Netser
6th	2021–2025	Solomon Malliki
7th	2025–present	Hannah Angootealuk

== Election results ==
=== 2025 election ===
2025 Nunavut general election
Candidate	Votes	%
Hannah Angootealuk	293	66.3
Solomon Malliki	149	33.7
Eligible voters		964
Total valid ballots		442
Rejected ballots		7
Turnout		48.70%

=== 2021 election ===
2021 Nunavut general election
Candidate	Votes	%
Solomon Malliki	134	27.7
Patterk Netser	111	23.0
Johnny Ningeongan	85	17.6
Helena Malliki	77	15.9
Lucassie Padlayat Nakoolak	76	15.7
Eligible voters		873
Total valid ballots		483
Rejected ballots		4
Turnout		55.8%

=== 2017 election ===
2017 Nunavut general election
Candidate	Votes	%
Patterk Netser	318	59.3
Jack Anawak	218	40.7
Eligible voters		832
Total valid ballots		536
Rejected ballots		11
Turnout		65.8%

=== 2013 election ===
2013 Nunavut general election
Candidate	Votes	%
Steve Mapsalak	263	58.4
Johnny Ningeongan	187	41.6
Eligible voters		704
Total valid ballots		450
Rejected ballots		4
Turnout		64%

=== 1983 election ===
1983 Northwest Territories general election
Candidate	Votes	%
Tagak Curley	420	54.30%
Piita Irniq	417	45.70%
Total valid ballots / Turnout	837	94.94%
Rejected ballots	8	
Source(s) "REPORT OF THE CHIEF ELECTORAL OFFICER ON THE GENERAL ELECTION OF MEMBERS TO THE COUNCIL OF THE NORTHWEST TERRITORIES 1983" (PDF). Elections NWT. May 1984.

== See also ==
- List of Nunavut territorial electoral districts
- Canadian provincial electoral districts
