= Akulliq =

Former territorial electoral district in Nunavut, Canada

Akulliq (Inuktitut pronunciation: [akulːiq]) was a territorial electoral district (riding) for the Legislative Assembly of Nunavut, Canada. The riding consisted of the communities of Kugaaruk and Repulse Bay. Kugaaruk is now a part of the Netsilik riding and Repulse Bay (which has since been renamed to Naujaat) is a part of the Aivilik riding.

== Election results ==
=== 1999 election ===
1999 Nunavut general election
Name	Vote	%
Ovide Alakannuark	219	53.03%
Steve Mapsalak	194	46.97%
Total Valid Ballots	413	100%
Voter Turnout %	Rejected Ballots	

=== 2004 election ===
2004 Nunavut general election
Name	Vote	%
Steve Mapsalak	161	34.04%
Roland Tungilik	96	20.30%
John Ningark	87	18.39%
Joani Kringayark	67	14.17%
George Bohlender	62	13.10%
Total Valid Ballots	473	100%
Voter Turnout 93.33%	Rejected Ballots 3	

=== 2008 election ===
The 2008 election was delayed in Akulliq due to a legal challenge brought by former Member of Parliament Jack Anawak, who filed as a candidate but was rejected by Elections Nunavut because he had not lived in Nunavut for twelve consecutive months prior to the election. After Anawak's challenge was dismissed by the courts, a by-election was held on December 15, 2008, but only two votes separated incumbent MLA Steve Mapsalak and his main challenger, former Northwest Territories MLA John Ningark.

A judicial recount was conducted, but resulted in Ningark and Mapsalak each receiving exactly 157 votes, thus forcing a second election on March 2, 2009.

December 15, 2008 by-election
Name	Vote	%
Steve Mapsalak	157	33.91%
John Ningark	157	33.91%
Helena Malliki	111	23.97%
Marius Tungilik	38	8.33%
Total Valid Ballots	463	100%
Voter Turnout 69.49%	Rejected Ballots 4	

March 2, 2009 by-election
Name	Vote	%
John Ningark	193	37.04%
Steve Mapsalak	179	34.36%
Ovide Alakannuark	83	15.93%
Helena Malliki	66	12.67%
Total Valid Ballots	521	100%
Voter Turnout 77.53%	Rejected Ballots 0	

== See also ==
- List of Nunavut territorial electoral districts
- Canadian provincial electoral districts
