= John Ningark =

Canadian politician

MLA for Natilikmiot, NT
- In office 1989–1999
- Preceded by: Michael Angottitauruq
- Succeeded by: riding dissolved

MLA for Akulliq, NU
- In office 2009–2013
- Preceded by: Steve Mapsalak
- Succeeded by: riding dissolved

Personal details
- Born: 17 March 1944 Repulse Bay, Northwest Territories
- Died: 17 November 2016 (aged 72) Kugaaruk, Nunavut
- Party: non-partisan consensus government

John Ningark (17 March 1944 – 17 November 2016) was a territorial level politician in Nunavut Canada. He was a member of the Legislative Assembly of the Northwest Territories and Legislative Assembly of Nunavut.

== Political history ==
Ningark, who was from Repulse Bay, Northwest Territories (now Naujaat, Nunavut), was elected to the Northwest Territories Legislative Assembly in a by-election in 1989 held in the Natilikmiot electoral district. He was returned by acclamation in the 1991 election. Ningark briefly served as Minister of Renewable Resources in 1992 but resigned shortly after being appointed, reportedly because he found the position too stressful. He won re-election to his third term and final term in the 1995 election, defeating future Nunavut MLA Uriash Puqiqnak by less than 30 votes.

He retired from the legislature in 1999, and did not seek election to the Legislative Assembly of Nunavut upon that territory's creation.

Ningark later attempted a political comeback, running for a seat in the 2004 Nunavut general election in the Akulliq electoral district, but was defeated by Steve Mapsalak.

He challenged Mapsalak again in the 2008 election, and according to preliminary results, he defeated Mapsalak by a margin of just two votes. A judicial recount was conducted, but resulted in Ningark and Mapsalak each receiving exactly 157 votes, thus forcing a new by-election. In the revote on 2 March, Ningark defeated Mapsalak by a margin of 193 to 179.
