= Nanulik =

Former territorial electoral district in Nunavut, Canada

Nanulik was a territorial electoral district (riding) for the Legislative Assembly of Nunavut, Canada. The riding consisted of the communities of Coral Harbour and Chesterfield Inlet. Coral Harbour is now a part of the Aivilik riding and Chesterfield Inlet is a part of Rankin Inlet North-Chesterfield Inlet.

== Election results ==
=== 1999 election ===
1999 Nunavut general election
Name	Vote	%
James Arvaluk	156	31.08%
Johnny Ningeongan	125	24.90%
Amauyak Netser	98	19.52%
Noel Kaludjak	71	14.14%
Anthyme Kadjuk	52	10.36%
Total Valid Ballots	502	100%
Voter Turnout %	Rejected Ballots	

=== 2003 by-election ===
September 2, 2003 by-election
Name	Vote	%
Patterk Netser	165	40.94%
George Tanuyak	158	39.21%
Francis Mazhero	80	19.85%
Total Valid Ballots	403	100%
Voter Turnout 72.03%	Rejected Ballots 4	

=== 2004 election ===
2004 Nunavut general election
Name	Vote	%
Patterk Netser	154	34.92%
Bernard Putulik	127	28.80%
Emily Beardsall	109	24.72%
Willie Nakoolak	51	11.56%
Total Valid Ballots	441	100%
Voter Turnout 77.78%	Rejected Ballots 0	

=== 2008 election ===
2008 Nunavut general election
Name	Vote	%
Johnny Ningeongan	214	46.6
Patterk Netser	182	39.7
Harry Tootoo	63	13.7
Total Valid Ballots	459	100%

== See also ==
- List of Nunavut territorial electoral districts
- Canadian provincial electoral districts
