= Coral Harbour =

Coral Harbour ᓴᓪᓕᖅ/ᓴᓪᓖᑦ Salliq/Salliit
- Hamlet
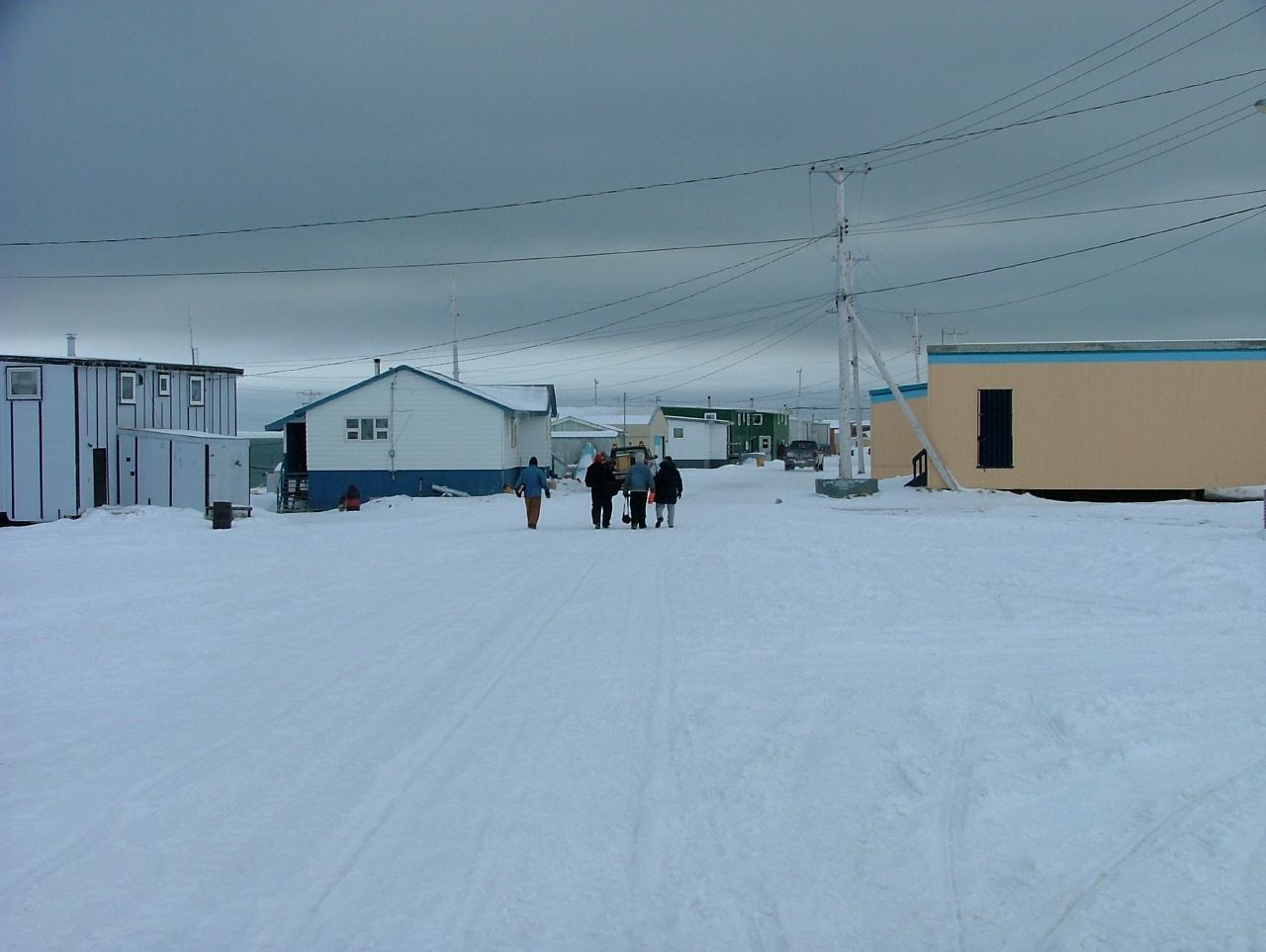
- Coral Harbour

- Location within Nunavut Location within Canada
- Coordinates: 64°08′N 083°10′W
- Country: Canada
- Territory: Nunavut
- Region: Kivalliq
- Electoral district: Aivilik

Government
  - Mayor: Willie Nakoolak
  - MLA: Hannah Angootealuk

Area (2021)
  - Land: 126.39 km^{2} (48.80 sq mi)
- Elevation: 64 m (210 ft)

Population (2021)
  - Total: 1,035
  - Density: 8.2/km^{2} (21/sq mi)
- Time zone: UTC−05:00 (EST)
- Canadian Postal code: X0C 0C0
- Area code: 867
- Website: www.coralharbour.ca

Coral Harbour (Inuktitut: Salliq / Salliit, Syllabics: ᓴᓪᓕᖅ / ᓴᓪᓖᑦ, formerly Southampton Island) is a small Inuit community that is located on Southampton Island, Kivalliq Region, in the Canadian territory of Nunavut. Its name is derived from the fossilized coral that can be found around the waters of the community which is situated at the head of South Bay. The name of the settlement in Inuktitut is Salliq, sometimes used to refer to all of Southampton Island. The plural Salliit, means large flat island(s) in front of the mainland.

== History ==
The Sadlermiut ("inhabitants of Salliq") whose name is derived from Salliq previously occupied the area. The Tuniit, a pre-Inuit culture, officially went ethnically and culturally extinct in 1902–03 when an illness killed all of the Sadlermiut in a matter of weeks. However, others believe that the Sadlermiut were descendants of the Thule, whose geographically isolated culture would have developed idiosyncratically from the mainland Thule culture.

At the beginning of the 20th century, the area was repopulated by Aivilingmiut, whose name was to be later adapted for the Aivilik electoral district, from the Naujaat and Chesterfield Inlet areas, influenced to do so by whaler Captain George Comer and others. Baffin Islanders arrived 25 years later. John Ell, who as a young child travelled with his mother Shoofly on Comer's schooners, eventually became the most famous of Southampton Island's re-settled population.

== Demographics ==
Federal census population history of Coral Harbour
Year	Pop.	±%
1971	358	—
1976	414	+15.6%
1981	429	+3.6%
1986	477	+11.2%
1991	578	+21.2%
1996	669	+15.7%
2001	712	+6.4%
2006	769	+8.0%
2011	834	+8.5%
2016	891	+6.8%
2021	1,035	+16.2%
Source: Statistics Canada

In the 2021 Canadian census conducted by Statistics Canada, Coral Harbour had a population of 1,035 living in 225 of its 303 total private dwellings, a change of 16.2% from its 2016 population of 891. With a land area of 126.39 km^{2} (48.80 sq mi), it had a population density of 8.2/km^{2} (21.2/sq mi) in 2021.

Coral Harbour is the only Nunavut community that does not observe daylight saving time, remaining on Eastern Standard Time year-round.

== Transportation ==
The only way to reach this community is by aircraft at Coral Harbour Airport or by water (such as the resupply barges, which do not carry passengers, that come from Churchill, Manitoba and the East coast and St. Lawrence area, every summer) and the main transportation on the island itself (nearly the same size as Switzerland) is by snowmobile and dog sled in the winter and all-terrain vehicle in the summer. Despite the harsh climate there is plentiful wildlife around the island. Among some of the species found there are walruses, polar bears, barren-ground caribou, ringed seals, gyrfalcons, and (rarely) peregrine falcons.

== Broadband communications ==
The community has been served by the Qiniq network since 2005. Qiniq is a fixed wireless service to homes and businesses, connecting to the outside world via a satellite backbone. The Qiniq network is designed and operated by SSI Micro. In 2017, the network was upgraded to 4G LTE technology, and 2G-GSM for mobile voice.

== Notable residents ==
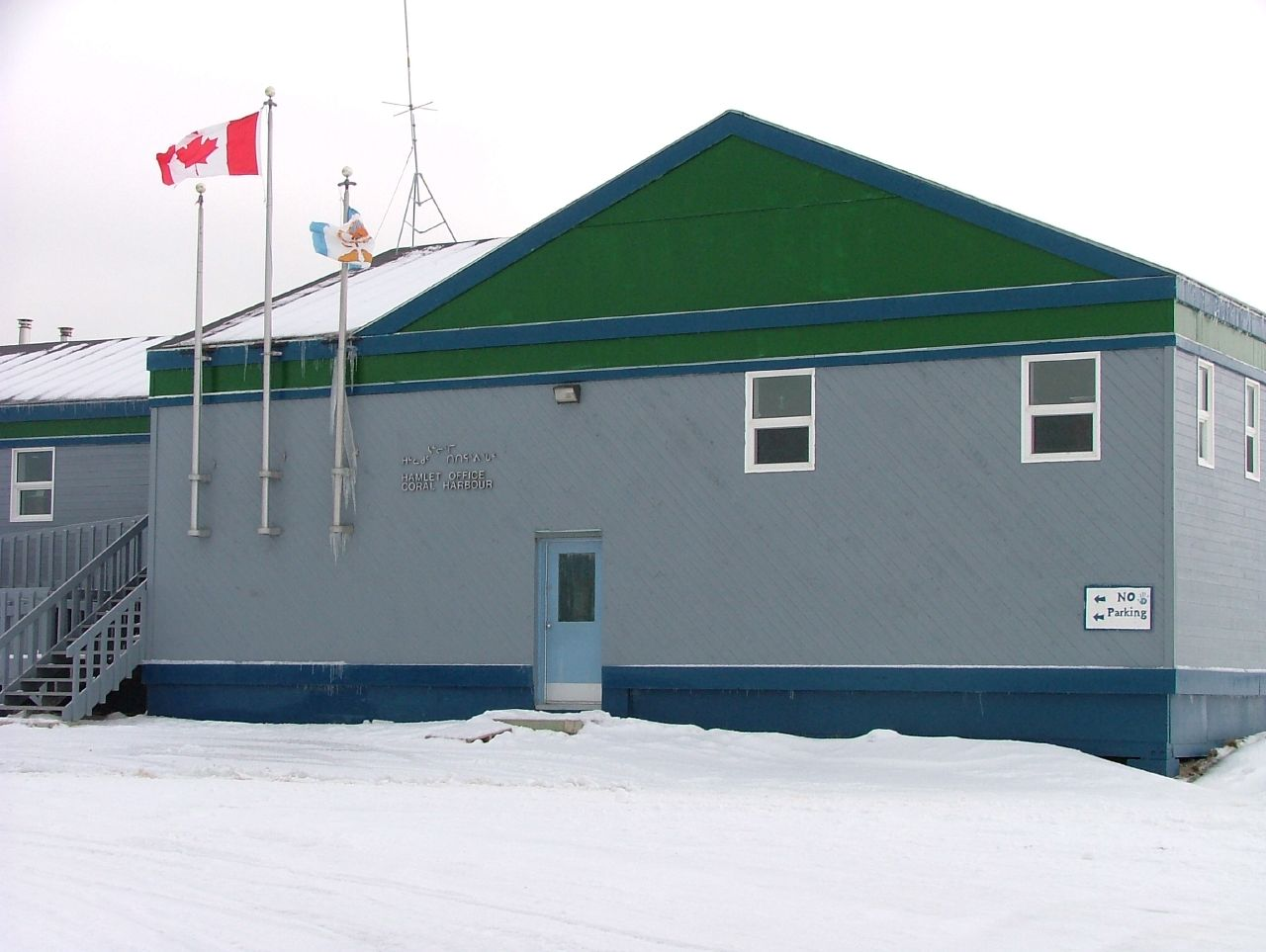
The Hamlet Office in Coral Harbour

- James Arvaluk, Nunavut's first Minister of Education and former member of the Legislative Assembly of Nunavut for Tununiq, represented Pond Inlet. Arvaluk had previously been elected in Nanulik representing the hamlets of Chesterfield Inlet and Coral Harbour. Prior to 1 April 1999 division of the Northwest Territories he served as a member of the Legislative Assembly of the Northwest Territories for the Aivilik (now split between Rankin Inlet North, Akulliq and Nanulik) electoral district.
- Tagak Curley, founder and first president Inuit Tapiriit Kanatami (Inuit Tapirisat of Canada). Curley is currently a member of the Legislative Assembly of Nunavut for Rankin Inlet North. Prior to division he represented Keewatin South and Aivilik and also stood as the Liberal candidate in the 1979 election for the Nunatsiaq (now Nunavut) riding.
- Patterk Netser, former member of the Legislative Assembly of Nunavut for Nanulik.
- Pudlo Pudlat, notable artist who was born on Baffin Island but lived in the Coral Harbour area until the age of six.
- Manitok Thompson, former member of the Legislative Assembly of Nunavut for Rankin Inlet South/Whale Cove, and prior to division, of the Legislative Assembly of the Northwest Territories for Aivilik. She was Nunavut's first female cabinet minister.

== Climate ==
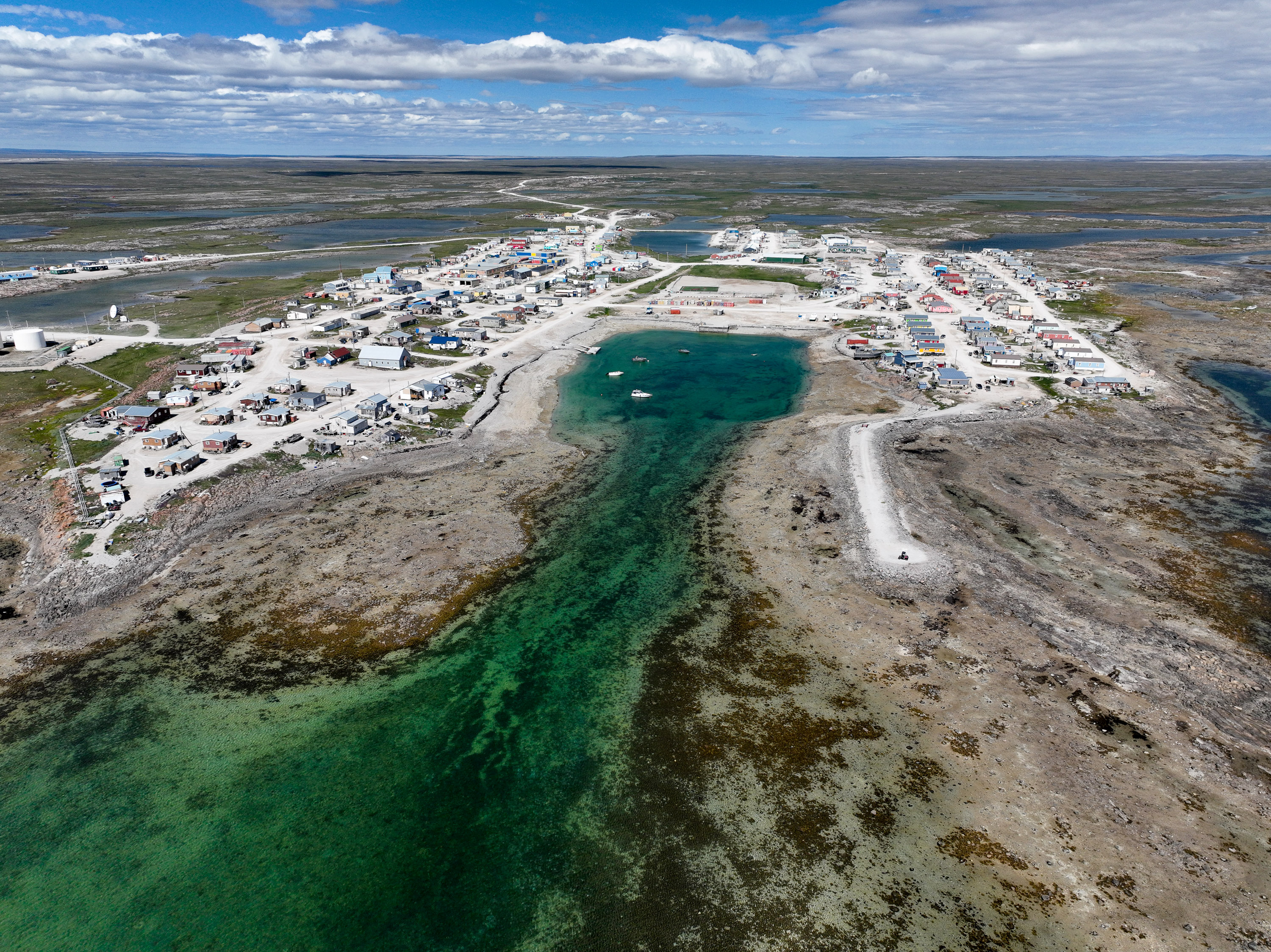
Aerial view of Coral Harbour, Nunavut, July 2026 via drone.

Coral Harbour has a severe subarctic climate (Köppen Dfc), for which it just qualifies due to its 10 °C (50 °F) July means. It is a borderline polar climate, which results in barren vegetation. Coral Harbour has never gone above freezing in February or March (although the latter has recorded 0.0 °C (32.0 °F)). Due to the frozen nature of Hudson Bay, there is a severe seasonal lag until June despite much sunshine and perpetual twilight at night. Due to the drop of solar strength and the absence of warm water even in summer, temperatures still drop off very fast as September approaches, with only July and August having ever recorded temperatures above 24 °C (75 °F). Cold extremes are severe, but in line with many areas even farther south in Canada's interior. Unlike those areas, Coral Harbour remains beneath −25 °C (−13 °F) in terms of average high in the midst of winter.

Throughout December 2010 and early January 2011, Nunavut, northern Quebec and western Greenland set many high temperature records. In Coral Harbour, a high of 3.3 °C (37.9 °F) in mid-December broke the old record of 1.7 °C (35.1 °F) set in 1963. The daily minimum temperature on 6 January 2011, was about 30 °C (54 °F) warmer than normal. The unusual warmth was due largely to an unseasonal area of high pressure over Greenland, and very negative values of the Arctic oscillation and North Atlantic oscillation. Mostly in the 21st century, the conditions have combined to produce an Arctic dipole anomaly that brings warm air to the Arctic regions and cold air to the continents.

Climate data for Coral Harbour (Coral Harbour Airport) WMO ID: 71915; coordinates 64°11′36″N 83°21′34″W; elevation: 62.2 m (204 ft); 1991–2020 normals, extremes 1933−present
Month	Jan	Feb	Mar	Apr	May	Jun	Jul	Aug	Sep	Oct	Nov	Dec	Year
Record high humidex	0.2	−1.9	−0.5	4.4	8.9	23.1	32.8	30.1	19.9	7.6	3.7	3.2	32.8
Record high °C (°F)	0.6 (33.1)	−1.1 (30.0)	0.0 (32.0)	5.0 (41.0)	9.4 (48.9)	23.5 (74.3)	28.0 (82.4)	26.1 (79.0)	18.5 (65.3)	7.6 (45.7)	4.0 (39.2)	3.4 (38.1)	28.0 (82.4)
Mean daily maximum °C (°F)	−24.9 (−12.8)	−25.6 (−14.1)	−20.2 (−4.4)	−11.0 (12.2)	−2.5 (27.5)	6.9 (44.4)	14.8 (58.6)	12.1 (53.8)	4.8 (40.6)	−2.5 (27.5)	−11.2 (11.8)	−19.2 (−2.6)	−6.5 (20.3)
Daily mean °C (°F)	−29.0 (−20.2)	−29.7 (−21.5)	−24.9 (−12.8)	−16.1 (3.0)	−6.0 (21.2)	3.5 (38.3)	10.2 (50.4)	8.2 (46.8)	2.0 (35.6)	−5.5 (22.1)	−15.5 (4.1)	−23.4 (−10.1)	−10.5 (13.1)
Mean daily minimum °C (°F)	−33.2 (−27.8)	−33.7 (−28.7)	−29.7 (−21.5)	−21.1 (−6.0)	−9.6 (14.7)	0.1 (32.2)	5.6 (42.1)	4.2 (39.6)	−0.8 (30.6)	−8.6 (16.5)	−19.8 (−3.6)	−27.6 (−17.7)	−14.5 (5.9)
Record low °C (°F)	−52.8 (−63.0)	−51.4 (−60.5)	−49.4 (−56.9)	−39.4 (−38.9)	−31.1 (−24.0)	−15.6 (3.9)	−1.1 (30.0)	−3.3 (26.1)	−17.2 (1.0)	−34.4 (−29.9)	−40.6 (−41.1)	−48.9 (−56.0)	−52.8 (−63.0)
Record low wind chill	−69.5	−69.3	−64.3	−55.1	−39.7	−23.2	−8.2	−11.8	−23.7	−43.7	−54.8	−64.2	−69.5
Average precipitation mm (inches)	10.9 (0.43)	—	9.6 (0.38)	18.2 (0.72)	19.9 (0.78)	28.0 (1.10)	34.8 (1.37)	61.7 (2.43)	44.9 (1.77)	36.6 (1.44)	23.3 (0.92)	—	—
Average rainfall mm (inches)	0.0 (0.0)	—	0.0 (0.0)	0.5 (0.02)	5.4 (0.21)	22.6 (0.89)	34.8 (1.37)	61.4 (2.42)	35.6 (1.40)	8.4 (0.33)	0.3 (0.01)	—	—
Average snowfall cm (inches)	—	11.2 (4.4)	—	9.6 (3.8)	18.1 (7.1)	14.8 (5.8)	5.4 (2.1)	0.0 (0.0)	0.0 (0.0)	7.8 (3.1)	28.1 (11.1)	22.9 (9.0)	—
Average precipitation days (≥ 0.2 mm)	9.4	—	8.7	9.7	10.6	10.2	9.8	13.0	12.0	15.4	14.0	—	—
Average rainy days (≥ 0.2 mm)	0.0	—	0.06	0.13	2.2	7.9	9.8	13.0	8.6	4.0	0.55	—	—
Average snowy days (≥ 0.2 cm)	9.2	—	8.7	9.7	9.4	3.4	0.0	0.0	4.1	14.0	13.4	—	—
Average relative humidity (%) (at 1500 LST)	67.4	66.4	69.2	74.5	80.3	73.1	62.8	69.1	75.8	85.5	79.7	72.0	73.0
Mean monthly sunshine hours	37.9	112.1	187.4	240.2	239.9	262.2	312.3	220.4	109.8	70.8	47.9	18.8	1,859.7
Percentage possible sunshine	22.4	47.0	51.6	53.2	42.0	41.9	51.2	43.3	27.9	23.3	24.3	13.9	36.8
Source: Environment and Climate Change Canada (sun 1981–2010)

== Geological resources ==
The limestone around Coral Harbour (and nearby regions of Bad Cache Rapids) predominantly have a "Low Purity" value for industrial use.

== See also ==
- List of municipalities in Nunavut
