= List of Canadian Inuit =

This is a partial list of Canadian Inuit. The Arctic and subarctic dwelling Inuit (formerly referred to as Eskimo) are a group of culturally similar Indigenous Canadians inhabiting the Northwest Territories, Nunavut, Nunavik (Quebec) and Nunatsiavut (Labrador) that are collectivity referred to as Inuit Nunangat.

The names of the communities are given as they were at the time of the birth or death. Those people who were born or died prior to 1 April 1999 in what is now Nunavut were actually born in the Northwest Territories.

Name	Birth date	Birthplace	Region	Death date	Death place	Region	Notes
Eva Aariak	10 January 1955	Arctic Bay	NU				politician, second Premier of Nunavut
Acoutsina	1697	Labrador	NL		Labrador	NL	interpreter
Willie Adams	22 June 1934	Fort Chimo	QC				politician who was a member of the Senate of Canada
Johnny Ned Adams	1960	Fort Chimo	QC				pilot, businessman and former mayor of the village of Kuujjuaq
Susan Aglukark	27 January 1967	Churchill	MB				musician
Leona Aglukkaq	28 June 1967	Inuvik	NT				politician, Minister of Health and Minister of Environment
Olayuk Akesuk	1965	Cape Dorset	NU				politician
Atuat Akkitirq		Igloolik	NU				filmmaker and costume designer, cofounder of Arnait Video Productions
Tony Akoak	1957 / 1958	Gjoa Haven	NU				politician
Manasie Akpaliapik	23 August 1955	Arctic Bay	NU				sculptor
David Alagalak	11 April 1944	Southampton Island	NU				politician
Ovide Alakannuark	25 December 1938	Pelly Bay	NU				politician
Madeleine Allakariallak		Resolute	NU				musician and television journalist
Titus Allooloo	1953	Pond Inlet	NU				politician and businessman
Simeonie Amagoalik	1 May 1933	Fort Chimo	QC	2 March 2011	Resolute	NU	carver
Jack Anawak	26 September 1950	Repulse Bay	NU				politician
William Andersen III		Okkak Bay	NL				politician
Wally Andersen	31 July 1951	Makkovik	NL				politician
Margaret Dawn Anderson	1966/1967	Tuktoyaktuk	NT				politician
Christopher Angatookalook			QC				actor, athlete, circus performer
Paul Apak Angilirq	1954			1998			film producer and screenwriter
Michael Angottitauruq	1951	Gjoa Haven	NU				politician
Stephen Angulalik	1898	Ellice River	NU	1990	Cambridge Bay	NU	fur trader and trading post operator
Irene Kataq Angutitok	1914	Bathurst Inlet	NU	1971	Repulse Bay	NU	sculptor
Moses Appaqaq	2 April 1946	Sanikiluaq	NU				carver, politician
Joe Arlooktoo	26 June 1939	Lake Harbour	NU				carver, politician
Goo Arlooktoo	28 November 1963	Lake Harbour	NU	30 April 2002	Kimmirut	NU	politician
Germaine Arnaktauyok	1946	Igloolik	NU				printmaker, painter, and drawer
Alethea Arnaquq-Baril		Iqaluit	NU				producer and director
Silas Arngna'naaq		Baker Lake	NU				politician
James Arreak	6 October 1952	Clyde River	NU				politician
James Arvaluk	April 1948	Coral Harbour	NU				politician
Kenojuak Ashevak	3 October 1927	Ikirasaqa	NU	8 January 2013	Cape Dorset	NU	artist
Shuvinai Ashoona	1961	Cape Dorset	NU				artist
Pitseolak Ashoona	1904 or 1907 or 1908	Nottingham Island	NU	1983			artist
Andrew Atagotaaluk		Salluit	QC				first Inuk diocesan bishop, Bishop of the Arctic
Aua	1870	Igloolik	NU	after 1922			angakkuq (shaman)
Moses Aupaluktuq		Baker Lake	NU				politician
Susan Avingaq			NU				writer, filmmaker
Levi Barnabas	24 January 1964	Igloolik	NU				politician
Ernie Bernhardt							politician
Paul-André Brasseur	25 August 1994	Montreal	QC				actor
Levinia Brown	1947	Dawson Inlet	NU				politician
Nicole Camphaug		Rankin Inlet	NU				fashion designer
Caubvick		Labrador	NL		Labrador	NL	visited England, smallpox carrier
Nellie Cournoyea	4 March 1940	Aklavik	NT				politician, Premier of the Northwest Territories
Charlie Crow	c. 1943	Richmond Gulf	QC				politician, disc jockey
Tagak Curley	1944	Coral Harbour	NU				politician, prominent figure in the negotiations that led to the creation of Nunavut
Beatrice Deer		Quaqtaq	QC				singer
Lisa Dempster		Charlottetown	NL				politician
Ebierbing	c. 1837	Cumberland Sound	NU	c. 1881			guide, husband of Tookoolito
Randy Edmunds		North West River	NL				politician
Edna Elias	1955	Coppermine	NU				politician, Commissioner of Nunavut
Monica Ell-Kanayuk	1954 / 1955						politician
Joe Enook	c. 1950s	Pond Inlet	NU				politician
Tommy Enuaraq		Clyde River	NU				politician, author
Elijah Erkloo		Pond Inlet	NU				politician
Kingmeata Etidlooie	1915	Itinik	NU	1989			artist
Tivi Etok	1929	Qirnituartuq	QC				artist, illustrator, and printmaker
Mark Evaloarjuk	1937			3 July 2002	Igloolik	NU	business pioneer and politician
Joe Allen Evyagotailak	15 July 1953	Coppermine	NU				politician
Alice Masak French	29 June 1930	Baillie Island	NT	5 July 2013	Souris	MB	
Simon Gibbons	21 June 1851	Forteau	NL	14 December 1896	Parrsboro	NS	first Inuk priest
Melissa Haney	1981	Inukjuak	QC				first female Inuk pilot to reach the rank of captain
Glenna Hansen	10 August 1956	Aklavik	NT				politician, Commissioners of the Northwest Territories
Ann Meekitjuk Hanson	22 May 1946	Qaktut	NU				politician, Commissioner of Nunavut
Donald Havioyak	1950	Napaktoktok	NU				politician
Joshua Haulli		Igloolik	NU				musician
George Hickes Jr.	1968 / 1969	Churchill	MB				politician
George Hickes Sr.	26 June 1946	Ports Point	NU				politician
Joseph Idlout		Pond Inlet	NU	2 June 1968	Resolute	NU	featured on the former Canadian two-dollar bill
Lucie Idlout	1978		NU				singer-songwriter
Paul Idlout	21 April 1935	Pond Inlet	NU	31 December 2025		NU	First Inuk Anglican bishop; featured on the former Canadian two-dollar bill
Osuitok Ipeelee	1922	Neeouleeutalik	NU	2005	Cape Dorset	NU	sculptor
Alootook Ipellie	1951	Nuvuqquq	NU	8 September 2007	Ottawa	ON	graphic artist, political and satirical cartoonist and writer, photographer, and Inuktitut translator
David Iqaqrialu	2 July 1954	Clyde River	NU				politician
Peter Irniq	22 August 1947	Lyon Inlet	NU				politician, Commissioner of Nunavut
Enoki Irqittuq	5 February 1955	Hall Beach	NU				politician
Elisapie Isaac	1977	Salluit	QC				pop singer, broadcaster, documentary filmmaker and activist
Johnny Issaluk		Chesterfield Inlet	NU				actor, athlete
Peter Ittinuar	19 January 1950	Chesterfield Inlet	NU				politician, first Inuk to be elected as an MP
Annie Ittoshat	1970	Kuujjuarapik	QC				Anglican bishop
Madeline Ivalu		Igloolik	NU				filmmaker and actor, cofounder of Arnait Video Productions
Paul-Dylan Ivalu	c. 1997	Igloolik	NU				actor, grandson of Madeline Ivalu
Samisa Passauralu Ivilla	1924	Puvirnituq		1995			artist
David Joanasie	22 June 1983	Frobisher Bay	NU				politician
Yvonne Jones	15 March 1968	Mary's Harbour	NL				politician, leader of the Liberal Party of Newfoundland and Labrador
Juurini		Kuujjuaq	QC				singer-songwriter
Victoria Kakuktinniq	1989	Rankin Inlet	NU				fashion designer
Helen Kalvak	1901	Tahiryuak Lake	NT	7 May 1984	Holman	NT	graphic artist, angakkuq (shaman)
Theresia Kappianaq							actress
Vinnie Karetak		Arviat	NU				actor, filmmaker
Nancy Karetak-Lindell	10 December 1957	Eskimo Point	NU				politician
Peter Kattuk	2 June 1950	Belcher Islands	NU				politician
Ann Martha Keenainak		Pangnirtung	NU				Anglican bishop
Simeonie Keenainak		Pangnirtung	NU				musician and RCMP
Pauloosie Keyootak		Broughton Island	NU				politician
Janet Kigusiuq	1926	Putuqsuqniq	NU	2005	Baker Lake	NU	artist, daughter of Jessie Oonark
Kikkik		Ennadai Lake	NU				charged with, but acquitted of, murder, child neglect and causing the death of one of her children
Ipeelee Kilabuk	1932	Pangnirtung	NU	2000			politician
Peter Kilabuk	27 September 1960	Pangnirtung	NU				politician
Kiviaq	23 January 1936	Chesterfield Inlet	NU				lawyer, politician, and former sportsman
Adamee Komoartok		Pangnirtung	NU				politician
David Pisurayak Kootook	13 August 1958	Spence Bay	NU	December 1972	Hottah Lake	NT	saved the life of Marten Hartwell after an aircraft crash
Madeleine Isserkut Kringayak	1928	Repulse Bay	NU	1984			sculptor and jewelry artist
Peter Kritaqliluk	1951	Eskimo Point	NU	27 August 2011	Arviat	NU	politician
George Kuksuk	c. 1954	Eskimo Point	NU				politician
Carol Kunnuk		Igloolik	NU				actress, filmmaker
Zacharias Kunuk	27 November 1957	Kapuivik	NU				producer and director
Floyd Kuptana	1964	Cape Parry	NT				artist, stone carvings
Rosemarie Kuptana	1954	Sachs Harbour	NT				Inuit rights activist, politician
Nellie Kusugak	1955	Rankin Inlet	NU				politician, Commissioner of Nunavut
Lorne Kusugak	1959 / 1960	Rankin Inlet	NU				politician
Michael Kusugak	27 April 1948	Repulse Bay	NU				children's writer
Jose Kusugak	2 May 1950	Repulse Bay	NU	19 January 2011	Repulse Bay	NU	politician
Anna Lambe		Iqaluit	NU				actress
Johannes Lampe		Nutak	NL				politician
Sarah Leo			NL				politician
Bill Lyall	1941	Fort Ross	NU				politician, businessman
Stacey Aglok MacDonald		Kugluktuk	NU				film and television producer
Helen Maksagak	15 April 1931	Bernard Harbour	NU	23 January 2009	Cambridge Bay	NU	politician, Commissioner of Nunavut, Commissioner of the Northwest Territories
Steve Mapsalak	17 March 1957	Repulse Bay	NU				politician
Johnny May	1945	George River	QC				first Inuk bush pilot in eastern Canada
Mosha Michael	c. 1948			17 November 2009	Toronto	ON	filmmaker, composer, carver
Mikak	c.1740	Labrador	NL	1 October 1795	Nain	NL	visited England, interpreter
Johnny Mike	1954 / 1955	Pangnirtung	NU				politician
Nancy Mike		Iqaluit	NU				musician
Rebecca Mike							politician
Rita "Riit" Mike-Murphy		Igloolik	NU				musician, actress
Andy Miki	1918	Eskimo Point	NU	1983	Eskimo Point	NU	artist
Simeon Mikkungwak	1968 / 1969	Baker Lake	NU				politician
Annie Mikpiga	1900	Puvirnituq	QC	1984	Puvirnituq	QC	artist
Nakasuk	early 20th century	Pangnirtung	NU				founder of Iqaluit
Agnes Nanogak	12 November 1925	Baillie Island	NT	5 May 2001	Holman	NT	artist
Mitiarjuk Nappaaluk		Igloolik	NU				writer
Lucy Netser		Pangnirtung	NU				Anglican bishop
Patterk Netser		Coral Harbour	NU				politician
John Ningark	17 March 1957	Pelly Bay	NU				politician
Johnny Ningeongan		Coral Harbour	NU				politician
William Noah	1944	Back River	NU				politician, artist, son of Jessie Oonark
Samuel Nuqingaq		Broughton Island	NU				politician
Jobie Nutarak	10 May 1947	Pond Inlet	NU	22 April 2006	Pond Inlet	NU	politician
Natan Obed		Nain	NL				politician
Paul Okalik	26 May 1964	Pangnirtung	NU				politician, Premier of Nunavut
Abe Okpik	12 January 1928	near Aklavik	NT	10 July 1997	Frobisher Bay	NU	politician, community leader, head of Project Surname
Jessie Oonark	2 March 1906	Chantrey Inlet	NU	7 March 1985	Churchill	MB	artist, mother of Janet Kigusiuq and William Noah
Elisapee Ootoova	6 January 1931	Devon Island	NU	May 2021	Pond Inlet	NU	Inuk elder
Orpingalik	fl. 1921						angakkuq (shaman), poet
Hezakiah Oshutapik	1955 / 1956	Pangnirtung	NU				politician
John Pangnark	1920	Eskimo Point	NU	1980	Eskimo Point	NU	sculptor
Charlie Panigoniak	7 March 1946	Chesterfield Inlet	NU				singer-songwriter and guitarist
Pauloosie Paniloo	1943	Clyde River	NU	20 April 2007	200 km south of Clyde River	NU	politician
Leah Angutimarik Panimera							actress
Parr	1893	Cape Dorset	NU	3 November 1969	Cape Dorset	NU	artist
Markoosie Patsauq		Igloolik	NU				writer
Enuk Pauloosie	1961	Spence Bay	NU				politician
Lena Pedersen	1940		Greenland				first woman elected to the Legislative Assembly of the Northwest Territories
Aaju Peter	1960	Arkisserniaq	Greenland				lawyer and sealskin clothing designer
Looty Pijamini	14 November 1953	Clyde River	NU				artist
David Ruben Piqtoukun	1950	Paulatuk	NT				artist
Peter Pitseolak	2 September 1902	Nottingham Island	NU	30 September 1973	Cape Dorset	NU	photographer, sculptor, artist and historian
Annabella Piugattuk	19 December 1982	Frobisher Bay	NU				actor
Calvin Pokiak	28 May 1955	Tuktoyaktuk	NT				politician
Annie Pootoogook	11 May 1969	Cape Dorset	NU	19 September 2016	Ottawa	ON	artist
Kananginak Pootoogook	1 January 1935	Ikerasak	NU	23 November 2010	Ottawa	ON	sculptor and printmaker
Napachie Pootoogook	26 June 1938	Sarruq Island	NU	18 December 2002	Cape Dorset	NU	artist, daughter of Pitseolak Ashoona and mother of Annie Pootoogook
Patty Pottle			NL				politician
Pudlo Pudlat	4 February 1916	Kamadjuak	NU	28 December 1992	Cape Dorset	NU	artist
Kenoayoak Pudlat							politician
Ludy Pudluk							politician
Uriash Puqiqnak	15 April 1946	Chantrey Inlet	NU				politician, carver
Andrew Qappik	25 February 1964	Nunatak Island	NU				graphic artist
Mumilaaq Qaqqaq		Baker Lake	NU				politician
Zorga Qaunaq			NU				actress, artist
Lucy Qinnuayuak	1915	Salluit	QC	1982			graphic artist and printmaker
Emiliano Qirngnuq	c. 1950	Pelly Bay	NU				politician
Rachel Qitsualik-Tinsley	late 1950s		NU				writer
Paul Quassa	12 January 1952	Igloolik	NU				politician
Tumasi Quissa	1948	near Akulivik	QC				singer-songwriter, carver
George Qulaut	c. 1954	Igloolik	NU				politician
Taamusi Qumaq	1 January 1914	near Inukjuak	QC	13 July 1993			helped preserve Inuit language and traditional culture, wrote an Inuktitut dictionary and an encyclopedia on Inuit Qaujimajatuqangit
Madeleine Redfern	1967	Frobisher Bay	NU				politician
Keith Rusell	24 May 1975	Happy Valley-Goose Bay	NL				politician
Todd Russell	22 December 1966	William's Harbour	NL				politician
Pitaloosie Saila	1942	Cape Dorset	NU				artist
Pauta Saila	1916 / 1917	Kilaparutua	NU	2009			artist
Tom Sammurtok	1946 / 1947						politician
Alexander Sammurtok							politician
Joe Savikataaq	8 December 1960						politician
Eric Schweig	19 June 1967	Inuvik	NT				actor
Elisapee Sheutiapik		Frobisher Bay	NU				politician
John Shiwak	1889	Rigolet	NL	20 November 1917	Masnières	France	sniper in the First World War
Isaac Shooyook	1939	Arctic Bay	NU				politician
Nick Sikkuark	21 May 1943	Garry Lake	NU	19 December 2013	Kugaaruk	NU	artist
Marika Sila	1991 / 1992	Yellowknife	NWT				actress and entertainer
David Simailak		Baker Lake	NU				politician
Mary Simon	1947	Kangiqsualujjuaq	QC				politician, diplomat, Governor General-designate of Canada
Vince Steen	1941	Aklavik	NT	3 February 2007			politician
Donald Suluk	c. 1925	Chesterfield Inlet	NU				religious figure
Thomas Suluk	14 March 1950	Eskimo Point	NU				politician
Tanya Tagaq	5 May 1975	Cambridge Bay	NU				throat singer, artist
Joe Talirunili	c. 1893	Qugaaluk River area or north of Puvirnituq	QC	1976			printmaker and sculptor
Louis Tapardjuk	30 January 1953	northwest of Igloolik	NU				politician
Peter Taptuna	1956	Cambridge Bay	NU				politician, Premier of Nunavut
Adam "Hyper-T" Tanuyak		Chesterfield Inlet	NU				musician
Ningeokuluk Teevee	27 May 1963	Cape Dorset	NU				writer and artist
Manitok Thompson	1955	Coral Harbour	NU				politician
Willie Thrasher	1948	Aklavik	NT				musician
Irene Avaalaaqiaq Tiktaalaaq	1941	Princess Mary Lake	NU				artist
John Tiktak	1916	Kareak	NU	1981	Rankin Inlet	NU	sculptor
Kane Tologanak							politician
Tookoolito	c. 1838	Cape Searle	NU	31 December 1876	Groton	CT	guide, wife of Ebierbing
Simon Tookoome	9 December 1934	Chantrey Inlet	NU	7 November 2010	Baker Lake	NU	artist
Jordin Tootoo	2 February 1983	Churchill	MB				hockey player
Hunter Tootoo	18 August 1963	Rankin Inlet	NU				politician
Lucy Tulugarjuk	28 February 1975	Igloolik	NU				actress, filmmaker
Victor Tungilik			NU				religious figure, both a Christian and a traditional angakkuq (shaman)
Lucy Tasseor Tutsweetok	1934	Nunalla	MB	2012	Arviat	NU	artist
Marion Tuu'luq	1910	Chantrey Inlet/Back River	NU	2002			artist
Jeannie Ugyuk		Spence Bay	NU				politician
Abraham Ulrikab	29 January 1845	Hebron	NL	13 January 1881	Paris	France	human zoo exhibit
Umik	fl. 1920		NU				angakkuq (shaman)
Natar Ungalaaq	1959	Igloolik	NU				actor, filmmaker, and sculptor
Terry Uyarak		Igloolik	NU				musician, circus performer
Uvavnuk	19th century	Igloolik area	NU				angakkuq (shaman), oral poet
Sheila Watt-Cloutier	1 December 1953	Fort Chimo	QC				politician, activist
Charlie Watt	29 June 1944	Fort Chimo	QC				politician
Rebekah Williams	3 March 1950						politician
Simonie Michael	1933	Apex, Iqaluit	NU	November 2008			first elected Inuk legislator in Canada
