= Amitturmiut =

Group of Inuit in Nunavut, Canada

The Amitturmiut are an Inuit group who live in northern Foxe Basin, in what is now Nunavut, Canada. They are a supergroup of "five or more small -miut groups" that "shared strong kinship ties." This part of Foxe Basin is rich in resources, including walrus, seal, and caribou, which meant that they could sustain "fairly substantial communities." By 2008, the Amitturmiut mainly live in Igloolik, whose people are now known as Iglulingmiut, and Sanirajak (Hall Beach).

According to the Qikiqtani Truth Commission, the "major geographical feature for the Amitturmiut were two areas of open water where two strong currents meet west of Rowley Island, where seals and walrus are especially abundant".

The Amitturmiut frequently travelled to the area around Pond Inlet. They are "bound to the sea, land, and ice of the region, and to each other, through hunting, language, cultural activities, kinship, and environmental understanding."

The Amitturmiut historical area —Ilagiit nunagivaktangit—where they hunted, stretched from "south past Amittuq, southwest to Qarmaqtalik, northwest to Aggu, northeast to Isuqtuq", and east to the Piling area of Baffin Island's west coast."Although the Amitturmiut had seven main winter camps—Usuarjuk, Alanriq, Iglulik, Iqaluit, Qaiqsut, Iglurjuat, and Maniqtuuq—one of their teachings discouraged the occupation for any one camp for too long, in order to allow the wildlife to replenish. The Amitturmiut "use and occupancy of the area goes back at least four thousand years".

Because resources were plentiful, many Igloolik families were able to occupy ilagiit nunagivaktangit well into the 1970s.
