= YIO =

YIO may refer to:

- Pond Inlet Airport, Nunavut, Canada, IATA airport code YIO
- Yamashina Institute for Ornithology, Tokyo, Japan
