= Qikiqta =

Island in Nunavut, Canada

- Location within Nunavut Location within Canada

Geography
- Location: Nunavut
- Coordinates: 72°46′03″N 077°26′22″W
- Archipelago: Arctic Archipelago

Administration
- Canada
- Territory: Nunavut
- Region: Qikiqtaaluk

Demographics
- Population: Uninhabited

Qikiqta (ᕿᑭᖅᑕ) formerly Beloeil Island is an uninhabited island located in the Qikiqtaaluk Region of Nunavut, Canada. It is separated from Baffin Island by Albert Harbour. The closest community is the Inuit hamlet of Pond Inlet, 15.6 km (9.7 mi) to the southwest.
