= YUX =

YUX may refer to:

- Sanirajak Airport, Canada, ICAO code YUX
- Southern Yukaghir language, ISO 639-3 language code yux
