= Amittuq =

Territorial electoral district in Nunavut, Canada

Nunavut electoral district
- Boundaries of Amittuq

Territorial electoral district
- Legislature: Legislative Assembly of Nunavut
MLA
Abraham Qammaniq
- District created: 1999
- First contested: 1999
- Last contested: 2025

Amittuq (Inuktitut: ᐊᒥᑦᑐᕐᒃ) is a territorial electoral district (riding) for the Legislative Assembly of Nunavut, Canada. The riding consists of the communities of Sanirajak and part of Igloolik. The boundary was redrawn for the 28 October 2013 general election.

== Members of the Legislative Assembly ==
Parliament	Years	Member
1st	1999–2004	Enoki Irqittuq
2nd	2004–2008	Louis Tapardjuk
3rd	2008–2013	Louis Tapardjuk
4th	2013–2017	George Qulaut
5th	2017–2021	Joelie Kaernerk
6th	2021–2025	Joelie Kaernerk
7th	2025–present	Abraham Qammaniq

== Election results ==
=== 2025 election ===
2025 Nunavut general election
Candidate	Votes	%
Abraham Qammaniq	148	41.1
Reena Irqittuq	80	22.2
Paul Haulli	74	20.6
Roger Beaudry	58	16.1
Eligible voters		663
Total valid ballots		360
Rejected ballots		1
Turnout		54.53%

=== 2021 election ===
2021 Nunavut general election
Candidate	Votes	%
Joelie Kaernerk	170	50.4
Solomon Allurut	167	49.6
Eligible voters		669
Total valid ballots		337
Rejected ballots		1
Turnout		50.4%

=== 2017 election ===
2017 Nunavut general election
Candidate	Votes	%
Joelie Kaernerk	115	27.6
Paul Haulli	84	20.2
George Qulaut	69	16.6
Reena Akumalik Irqittuq	46	11.1
Jason Ikeperiar	41	9.9
Solomon Angugasak Allurut	39	9.4
Erasmus Ivvalu	22	5.3
Eligible voters		648
Total valid ballots		416
Rejected ballots		2
Turnout		64.51%

=== 2013 election ===
2013 Nunavut general election
Candidate	Votes	%
George Qulaut	244	68.5
Paul Haulli	103	31.5
Eligible voters		589
Total valid ballots		347
Rejected ballots		9
Turnout		60.5%

=== 2008 election ===
2008 Nunavut general election
Candidate	Votes	%
Louis Tapardjuk	399	65.2
Joanna Quassa	213	34.8
Eligible voters		1,033
Total valid ballots		612
Rejected ballots		16
Turnout		59.19%

=== 2004 election ===
2004 Nunavut general election
Candidate	Votes	%
Louis Tapardjuk	277	34.98
Solomon Allurut	176	27.12
Paul Hauli	90	13.88
Enoki Irqittuq	90	13.88
Levi Kaunak	66	10.14
Eligible voters		841
Total valid ballots		699
Rejected ballots		0
Turnout		83.12%

=== 1999 election ===
1999 Nunavut general election
Candidate	Votes	%
Enoki Irqittuq	251	33.03
Mark Evaloarjuk	210	27.63
Solomon Allurut	128	16.84
Cain Iqqaqsaq	101	13.29
Joanna Oolateeta	70	9.21
Eligible voters		893
Total valid ballots		760
Rejected ballots		0
Turnout		85.11%

== See also ==
- List of Nunavut territorial electoral districts
- Canadian provincial electoral districts
