= Joelie Kaernerk =

Canadian Inuk politician

Member of the Legislative Assembly of Nunavut for Amittuq
- In office October 30, 2017 – September 22, 2025
- Preceded by: George Qulaut
- Succeeded by: Abraham Qammaniq

Joelie Kaernerk is a Canadian Inuk politician from Hall Beach, Nunavut. He was elected to the Legislative Assembly of Nunavut in the 2017 general election. He represented the electoral district of Amittuq until 2025.
