= Omalluq Oshutsiaq =

Inuk artist (1948–2014)

- Born: 1948
- Died: 2014 (aged 65–66)
- Parents: Etidlooie Etidlooie (father); Kingmeata Etidlooie (mother)

Omalluq Oshutsiaq [Oo-ma-lu Oo-shoot-see-ak] (1948–2014) was an Inuk artist. She was initially a sculptor, but stopped after an accident with an electric grinder in 1990. She turned to drawing in 2013. Her exhibit Omalluq: Pictures from my Life was shown at the Winnipeg Art Gallery in 2024. The entire collection was purchased by the Gallery in 2015.

Her work is included in the collections of the Musée national des beaux-arts du Québec, Musée national des beaux-arts du Québec, the McCord Museum and the Art Gallery of Hamilton. and the Winnipeg Art Gallery.
