= Enoki Irqittuq =

Canadian politician

MLA for Amittuq
- In office 1999–2004
- Preceded by: first member
- Succeeded by: Louis Tapardjuk

Personal details
- Born: February 5, 1955 (age 71)
- Party: non-partisan consensus government

Enoki Irqittuq is a former territorial level politician from Sanirajak, Nunavut, Canada. He served as a member of the Legislative Assembly of Nunavut from 1999 until 2004.

Irqittuq was elected in the 1999 Nunavut general election. He won the electoral district of Amittuq in a close race defeating former Northwest Territories MLA Mark Evaloarjuk and three other candidates winning 33% of the popular vote. He ran for a second term in office in the 2004 Nunavut general election but was badly defeated by candidate Louis Tapardjuk finishing second last in a field of five candidates.
