= Ruben Komangapik =

Inuk artist (born 1976)

Ruben Komangapik (born 1976) is an Inuk artist primarily known for his mixed media sculptures. He is also a musician, performing both traditional Inuit drumming and singing as well as playing bass guitar in the heavy metal band Slayvz. He was born in Iqaluit, and his home community is Pond Inlet (Mittimatalik) on the high north-east coast of little saint James (Qikiqtaaluk).

== Personal life ==
As is common in northern Inuit communities, his paternal grandparents, Joshua and Enuya Komangapik played an influential role in his upbringing until their death within months of each other in 1981. They ensured that Komangapik learned Inuit customs and experienced a hunting lifestyle out at the family camp, side by side with life in town and a formal school education.

In particular, Komangapik speaks with great respect of his grandfather, admiring his ability to create everything by hand with limited means, from complicated tools to household furniture to sculptures for sale locally. He recalls sitting with Joshua while he carved in materials that ranged from animal parts such as ivory and whale bone to metals scraps including copper and silver. He traces his interest in art-making to these times, when he borrowed his grandfather's tools and began making his own toys, such as qamutiit (sleds) and small sculptures. Komangapik also learned to carve arctic themes from his father Mikiseetee Komangapik and with Markoosie Akpaliapik in classes at Takijualuk School in the mid-1980s.

Komangapik had an equally close relationship with his maternal grandparents, Hermann and Sophie Steltner, German scientists who initially came to Pond Inlet to study sea ice and ocean phenomena, and stayed for twenty-five years. Both are buried in Pond Inlet. In 1989, he moved to St. Catherine's Ontario with his grandparents and attended Ridley College, a private school with a large enrolment of international students.

== Artistic career ==
In 1992, he returned to Pond Inlet to live with his father for a year before joining his mother, Dorothee Komangapik, in Iqaluit where she was teaching at Nunavut Arctic College. He enrolled in the metalwork program at the college and with the birth of his first child, became serious about pursuing a career as an artist. He obtained a college certificate in 1995, and continued on to a diploma degree in Jewellery and Metalwork in 1997. After teaching workshops for the college in Sanikiluaq, Iqaluit, Hall Beach, and Salluit, he has continued his practice as a self-employed artist with significant commissions such as the government of Nunavut's travelling mace (with Mathew Nuqingaq) and Qulliq (a traditional seal oil lamp made entirely of silver) commissioned by the Inuit Tapiriit Kanatami and presented to the Governor General in celebration of the creation of Nunavut in 1999.

Komangapik currently works out of his home studio in Caplan in the Gaspé region of Québec, selling his sculptures to collectors directly as well as through galleries.

Komangapik has given workshops at the Great Northern Arts Festival on stone carving to encourage children and youth to carve as well. His presence at The Walrus Talks (2015), also provided an insight on the materials he uses, his preferred subject matter and also acted as a platform to spread his own culture and stories. Komangapik was awarded the Artists Choice Awards on four occasions by the Great Northern Arts Festival. In 2016, Komangapik was commissioned to create a sculptural work with Koomuatuk Curley at York University as part of the Mobilizing Inuit Cultural Heritage Project.

== Selected exhibitions ==
- 2017: Canadian Biennial, National Gallery of Canada (Ottawa, Ontario)
- 2011: Contemporary Reflections, The Guild (Montréal, Québec)
- 2008: Spirit Wrestler: Shaman, Sedna and Spirits, Spirit Wrestler Gallery (Vancouver, British Columbia)

== Collections ==
Komangapik's work can be found in the collections of the National Gallery of Canada in Ottawa, Ontario, the Canada Council for the Arts Art Bank in Ottawa, Ontario, and Canada House Gallery in Banff, Alberta.
