= Abraham Qammaniq =

Canadian politician

Abraham Qammaniq MLA

Member of the Legislative Assembly of Nunavut for Amittuq
- Incumbent
- Assumed office October 27, 2025
- Preceded by: Joelie Kaernerk

Personal details
- Party: Non-partisan consensus government

Abraham Qammaniq is a Canadian Inuk politician, who was elected to the Legislative Assembly of Nunavut in the 2025 Nunavut general election. He represents the electoral district of Amittuq. He competed on season 2 of Canada's Greatest Know-It-All, finishing 9th.
