= Jaanimmarik =

Coordinates: 58.1104°N 68.4017°W

Jaanimmarik School is located in Kuujjuaq, Quebec. About 350 students from grade 4 to secondary 5 attend Jaanimmarik school. The school offers course in English, French, and Inuktitut. It is one of the schools in the Kativik School board. The school's website is offered in French and English.
