= Victor Tungilik =

Victor Tungilik was an Inuk religious figure who was both a Christian and a traditional angakkuq (spiritual healer) of Anglican parents. Tungilik later eschewed his angakkuq practices and moved to Naujaat.
