= Adamee Komoartok =

Canadian politician

Member of the Legislative Assembly of Nunavut
- In office 2008–2011
- Preceded by: Peter Kilabuk
- Succeeded by: Hezekiah Oshutapik
- Constituency: Pangnirtung

Personal details
- Party: non-partisan consensus government

Adamee Komoartok is a Canadian politician, who was elected as the Member of the Legislative Assembly for the electoral district of Pangnirtung in the Legislative Assembly of Nunavut in the 2008 territorial election.

On 10 March 2011, all Nunavut MLAs, with the exception of Moses Aupaluktuq and James Arvaluk who were absent, voted to suspend Komoartok until the spring session. His suspension arose after he was charged with "assault causing bodily harm" on his wife, Penena Mosesee, who was also charged with assault.

On 15 March 2011, Komoartok announced that he was resigning as MLA for Pangnirtung. He first announced his resignation on the community radio and the hamlet issued a release supporting his resignation. A by-election for the seat was to be held within six months.
