= Umik =

Umik (alternately Uming) was an Inuk angakkuq (shaman) who proclaimed himself a Christian evangelist and began to preach to the Igloolik Inuit in the 1920s.

Umik was one of several angakkuq who syncretised Christianity and Inuit traditions. Umik's practices included the use of flags, shaking hands (even those of dogs and children), and Sunday as a day of rest. However, his beliefs also included heterodox practices such as polygamy.
