= George Qulaut =

Canadian politician

The Honourable George Qulaut MLA

Member of the Legislative Assembly of Nunavut for Amittuq
- In office October 28, 2013 – September 24, 2017
- Preceded by: Louis Tapardjuk
- Succeeded by: Joelie Kaernerk

8th Speaker of the Legislative Assembly of Nunavut
- In office November 15, 2013 – 2017
- Preceded by: Hunter Tootoo
- Succeeded by: Joe Enook

Personal details
- Born: 1954 (age 71–72) Igloolik, Northwest Territories (now Nunavut)
- Party: non-partisan consensus government

George Quviq Qulaut (born c. 1954) is a Canadian politician elected to the Legislative Assembly of Nunavut in the 2013 election, where he served a full term MLA and Speaker representing the Amittuq district. He was born in Igloolik and represented the electoral district of Amittuq until his defeat in the 2017 election.

George joined the Qikiqtani Inuit Association (QIA) in January 2022.

He studied at Algonquin College in Ottawa and worked at the Igloolik Eastern Research Centre for 14 years. He was a QIA Community Director in Igloolik for 9 years, and Chairman of Qikiqtaaluk Corporation (QC).
