= Elisapee Ootoova =

Inuk elder (1931–2021)

- Born: January 6, 1931; Devon Island, Northwest Territories, Canada
- Died: May 18, 2021 (aged 90); Pond Inlet, Nunavut, Canada

Elisapee Ootoova (January 6, 1931 – May 18, 2021) was an Inuk elder who preserved and promoted Inuit traditional knowledge.

== Early life ==
Qiliqti was born on January 6, 1931, near Lancaster Sound on Devon Island. Qiliqti was the daughter of a white member of the RCMP and an Inuk woman named Ataguttiaq. However, she was raised by her adoptive father, named Qamaniq, who was a hunter.

When Qiliqti was a year old, her family returned to the Mittimatalik/Pond Inlet area, where her mother was from. She lived in her family's hunting camps in the Mittimatalik region, where her father would catch whales and seals and birds. Her father would do most of the hunting, assisted by her older brother. Qiliqti had four siblings in total. When Qiliqti was older, she had another sister, but she died at the age of 2. After Qiliqti's younger sister died, her mother had another daughter.

When Qiliqti was five or six, she learned how to read and write in the Inuktitut language. She learned from her mother and from an Inuktitut bible. Her parents were baptized when she was five into the Anglican faith. After they were baptized, they were told to stop singing traditional Inuit songs (ajaajaa), and to sing hymns instead. As a result, Qiliqti did not learn the ajaajaa until she was an adult. Qiliqti was baptized at the age of 11; at that point, she was given the name Elisapee. Following their conversion to Christianity, her community would gather themselves together to pray on Sunday; when there was no minister, the wisest person around would deliver a sermon. The Christian minister required the Inuit to not work on Sunday, have only one wife, to not swap wives, and to be kind to each other.

There were no medical workers in Mittimatalik until Ootoova was an adult, so all medical care was done according to traditional Inuit knowledge. There were no radios until the 1960s.

== Adult years ==
Ootoova was betrothed to a relative when she was a still a baby; she married him at the age of 16. She was not married officially, in a church; but she considered herself married when she started to live with him. In her words: "God can see what's happening and He was already our witness." She was initially resistant to the marriage but eventually came to love her husband, and stayed with him for many decades.

Ootoova gave birth to 11 children over the course of her life. Her first nine births took place under the guidance of her mother and mother-in-law, or when she was away from home, with a midwife. In some ways her first births resembled a traditional Inuit childbirth, but by that point in time the Inuit had already given up the practice of having a woman give birth alone in an igloo; she was instead supported by her relatives. Her final two births took place in a hospital. Some of her children were adopted out immediately after birth following the orders of the elders; it was traditional for the elders to adopt out children to couples who were having trouble conceiving, or if the mother already had enough children to care for.

A school opened in her community in 1963. The school taught her children English and taught them the ways of white people, but did not teach her children the Inuktitut language, or how to survive in the north. The education her children received caused cultural conflict within Elisapee's family. When Ootoova was 31, she was taken to the south in order to be treated for tuberculosis.

== Later life ==
Elisapee Ootoova wrote the "Uqausiit Tukingit", a dictionary of the Tununirmiut traditional language of north Baffin Island. In the 1990s, she worked with fellow Pond Inlet native Martha Kyak in order to prepare Inuktitut teaching resources. She co-authored an encyclopedia of traditional Inuit knowledge, and served as a consultant for many books and films on Inuit knowledge and history.

She was instrumental in preserving much Inuit heritage, including the now popular song "Quviasuliqpunga", which was written by her grandfather about the return of sunlight after the winter. The song is a pisiq, or a drum dance song.

She was invited to participate in the founding ceremonies for the territory of Nunavut in 1999, where she tended a qulliq and gave an address. She invited her audience to care for their environment. In 2000, she was invited to speak before the Qikiqtani Truth Commission, where she testified that four of her husband's sled dogs were shot by the RCMP.

In 2002, she was awarded the Queen Elizabeth II Golden Jubilee Medal. In 2002, she was also awarded the Governor General's Award in Commemoration of the Persons Case. In 2003, she was appointed a member of the Order of Canada.

In 2015, a story from her childhood was turned into a French-language film by director Christian M. Fournier, called Nallua: duty of memory. In 2017, she lit the qulliq at the official announcement of the Tallurutiup Imanga National Marine Conservation Area.

== Death ==
On May 25, 2021, it was announced that Elisapee Ootoova had died at some point during the previous week. MLA David Qamaniq paid tribute to Ootoova on May 27 in the Legislative Assembly of Nunavut.
