= Johnny Ned Adams =

Canadian pilot

Johnny Ned Adams (born 1960) is a Canadian pilot, businessman and former mayor of the village of Kuujjuaq in Quebec, Canada. His leadership helped the development of his community and has been recognized by the Quebec government by naming him Knight of the National Order of Quebec in 2006. He received the Order of Canada in 2023, with the rank of Officer.
