= Kingmeata Etidlooie =

Inuk Canadian artist (1915–1989)

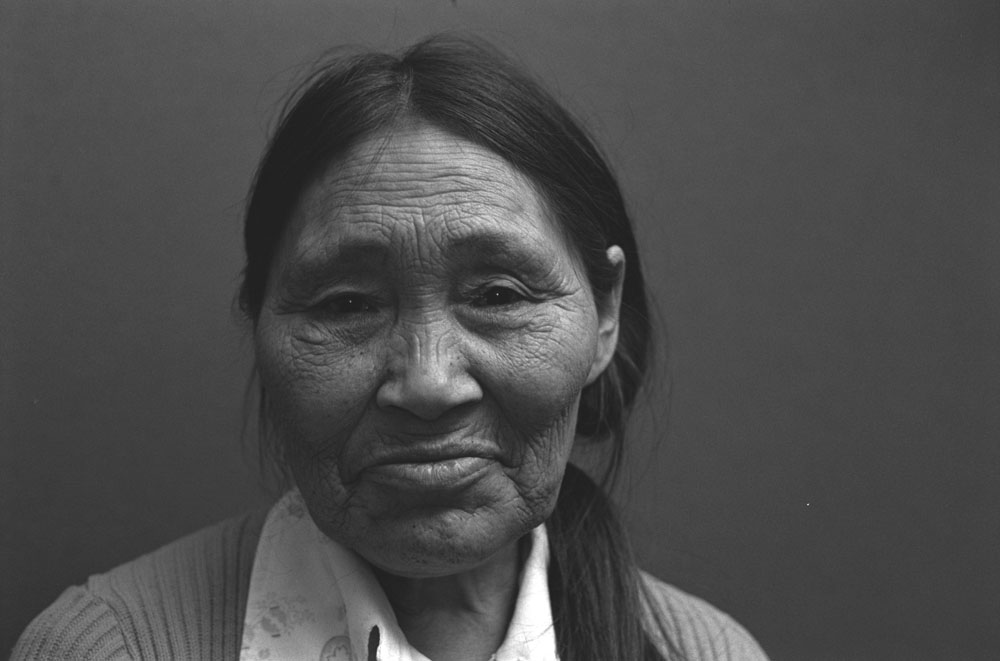
- Kingmeata Etidlooie in 1980
- Born: 1915; Lake Harbour, Northwest Territories (now Kimmirut, Nunavut)
- Died: 1989 (aged 73–74)

Kingmeata Etidlooie (Inuk, 1915–1989) was an Inuk Canadian artist.

== Name ==
Her name is also spelled Kingmeata, Kingmeeatta, Kingmeattar, Etidlui, and Etidloie.

== Early life ==
Born in Itinik Camp near Lake Harbour, Northwest Territories (now Kimmirut, Nunavut), Etidlooie spent the first half of her life living in camps on the south coast of Baffin Island.

== Art career ==
Etidlooie began her career as an artist in the late 1950s, when she focused on drawing and carving following the death of her first husband, Elijah. In the mid-1960s, she moved to the settlement of Cape Dorset. Following her move to Cape Dorset, she joined the West Baffin Eskimo Cooperative along with her second husband, the graphic artist Etidlooie Etidlooie (1910-1981).

Kingmeata is notable as an early West Baffin adopter of paint media, and her early drawings were noted for their painterly qualities by both Terry Ryan and K. M. Graham, who offered her watercolour and acrylic paint sets respectively. Between 1970 and 1989, she had more than fifty of her prints published, and she was known as an enthusiastic contributor to the West Baffin Eskimo Cooperatives painting studio following its establishment in 1976. Her children, Etulu Etidlui, Omalluq Oshutsiaq, Pukaluk Etungat, and Kellypalik Etidlooie, are sculptors.

== Style ==
Stylistically, she is known for well-structured visual works predominantly featuring bird and animal motifs. As her media of choice evolved from drawings to paintings and prints, her works featured rich, saturated colors and formal composition, as can be seen in her early 1980s prints titled Birds Share A Fish and Lake Trout Near Our Camp.

== Collection ==
Her works are held by the National Gallery of Canada, Art Gallery of Ontario, Winnipeg Art Gallery, Canada Council Art Bank, and the Canadian Museum of History.
