= Hezakiah Oshutapik =

Canadian politician (died 2020)

MLA for Pangnirtung
- In office 2011–2013
- Preceded by: Adamee Komoartok
- Succeeded by: Johnny Mike

Personal details
- Born: 1955 or 1956 Pangnirtung, Northwest Territories, Canada
- Died: April 17, 2020 (aged 63) Pangnirtung, Nunavut, Canada
- Party: non-partisan consensus government

Hezakiah Oshutapik (sometimes spelt as Hezekiah, 1955 or 1956 – April 17, 2020) was a Canadian politician, who was elected to represent the district of Pangnirtung in the Legislative Assembly of Nunavut in a by-election on September 12, 2011.

Oshutapik previously served as mayor of Pangnirtung. He died on April 17, 2020, at the age of 63, from a heart attack.
