= Donald Suluk =

Donald Suluk (alternately Sulutnar, born approximately 1925, Chesterfield Inlet, Nunavut-?) was an Inuk religious figure who preached a syncretic form of Christianity in Nunavut in the 1940s.

Suluk promoted practices such as the use of crucifixes, but also heterodox practices such as using his dog to make people confess.

== Sources ==
- Aparecida Vilaça, Robin Wright. Native Christians: Modes and Effects of Christianity Among Indigenous Peoples of the Americas. Ashgate Publishing, Ltd., 2009 ISBN 0-7546-6355-8, 978-0-7546-6355-3
