= Orpingalik =

Netsilik Inuk spiritual healer and poet

Orpingalik was a Netsilik Inuk angakkuq (spiritual healer) and oral poet who provided anthropological input to Danish explorer Knud Rasmussen during the latter's 1921–1924 expedition.

Orpingalik was married to an Inuk woman named Uvlunuaq, also a noted poet. The couple had two recorded sons: Igsivalitaq, who killed a hunting partner in 1921 and fled his homeland to escape the Royal Canadian Mounted Police; and Inugjak, who drowned while he and his father tried to cross a river.

== Death of Inugjak ==
According to Qaqortingnek, another shaman, Inugjak's death was caused by irinaliut utirtuq inungminut, where a harmful spell rebounds upon its caster (or, as in this case, someone close to them). After Jean Berthie, a white trader from the Hudson's Bay Company, scolded Inugjak for tampering with his instruments, Orpingalik cast a spell to kill Berthie. However, Berthie was too powerful a shaman, so the spell instead targeted Inugjak. When he and Orpingalik tried to use an ice pan to transport their supplies across an inland river, the otherwise stable pan was supposedly pulled down by some force (presumed to be the spell).

Orpingalik's own testimony does not mention Berthie, nor any supernatural cause for the accident. It does, however, state that after the accident, Orpingalik used magic to briefly revive Inugjak, but the spell was broken and Inugjak died when he was wrapped in a blanket that had been touched by a menstruating woman.

== Works in translation ==
- The Rag and Bone Shop of the Heart: Poems for Men, edited by Robert Bly, James Hillman, and Michael J. Meade, HarperCollins Publishing, 1992. ISBN 0060167440, 9780060167448.

== Sources ==
- Penny Petrone. Northern Voices: Inuit Writing in English. University of Toronto Press, 1992. ISBN 080207717X, 9780802077172. Pg 21.
