= Samisa Passauralu Ivilla =

Inuk sculptor

Samisa Passauralu Ivilla (1924–1995) was an Inuk sculptor based in Puvirnituq, Quebec, Canada.

His work is included in the collections of the National Gallery of Canada, the Winnipeg Art Gallery, the Musée national des beaux-arts du Québec and the Schumiatcher Collection at the University of Regina.
