= Pond Inlet Airport =

Airport in Nunavut, Canada

- IATA: YIO; ICAO: CYIO; WMO: 71095

Summary
- Airport type: Public
- Operator: Government of Nunavut
- Location: Pond Inlet, Nunavut
- Time zone: EST (UTC−05:00)
  - Summer (DST): EDT (UTC−04:00)
- Elevation AMSL: 202 ft / 62 m
- Coordinates: 72°41′22″N 077°58′08″W

Map
- Location in Nunavut CYIO (Canada)

Runways
Direction	Length		Surface
Direction	ft	m	Surface
02/20	4,006	1,221	Gravel

Statistics (2010)
- Aircraft movements: 827
- Sources: Canada Flight Supplement; Environment Canada; Movements from Statistics Canada.

Pond Inlet Airport (IATA: YIO, ICAO: CYIO) is located at Pond Inlet, Nunavut, Canada, and is operated by the government of Nunavut.

== Airlines and destinations ==
Airlines	Destinations
Canadian North	Arctic Bay, Iqaluit, Resolute
