= Sanirajak Airport =

Airport at Sanirajak, Nunavut, Canada

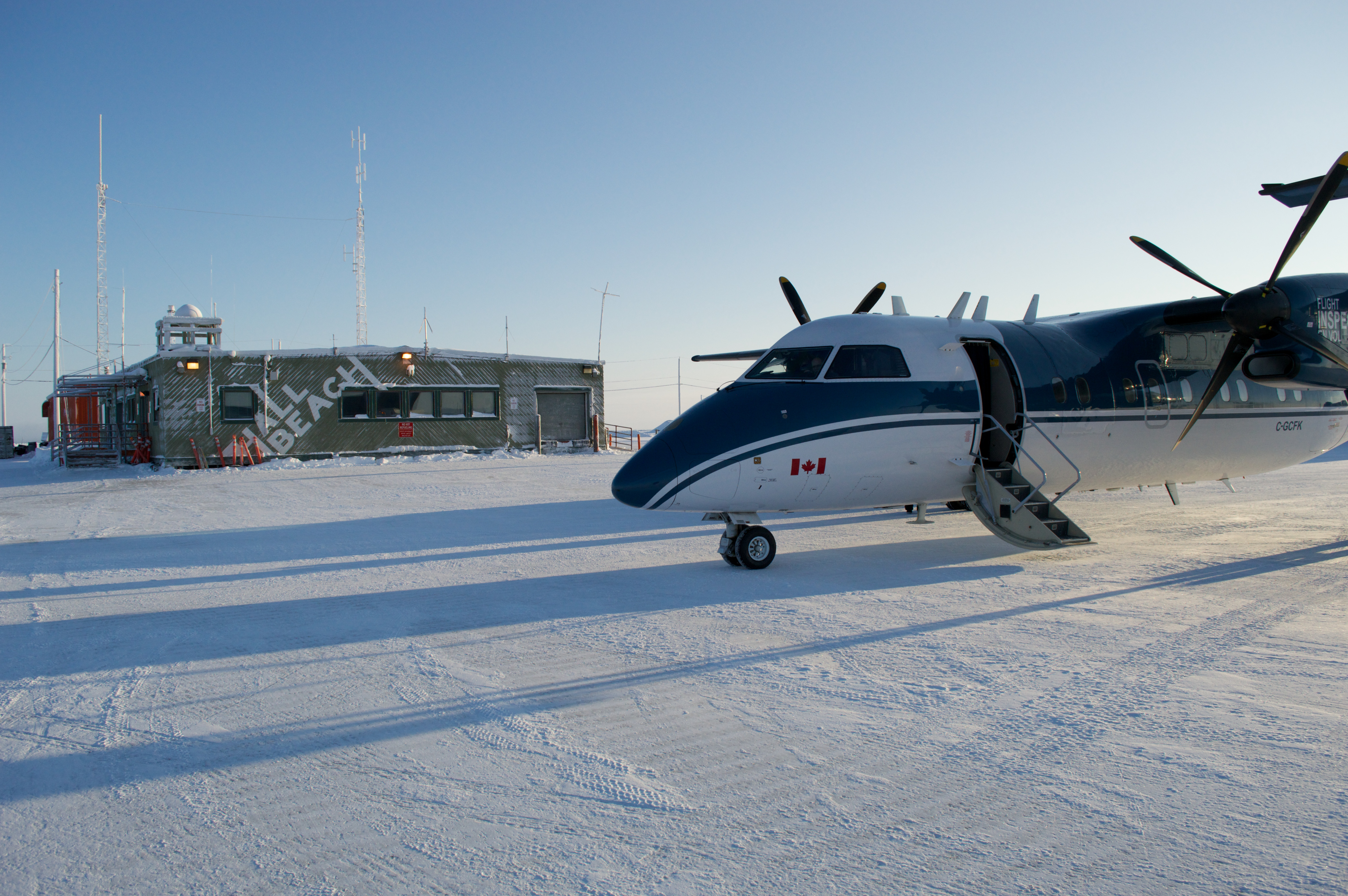
- Sanirajak Airport (terminal building on the left)
- IATA: YUX; ICAO: CYUX; WMO: 71081

Summary
- Airport type: Public
- Operator: Government of Nunavut
- Location: Sanirajak, Nunavut
- Time zone: EST (UTC−05:00)
  - Summer (DST): EDT (UTC−04:00)
- Elevation AMSL: 30 ft / 9 m
- Coordinates: 68°46′33″N 081°14′33″W

Map
- Location in Nunavut CYUX (Canada)

Runways
Direction	Length		Surface
Direction	ft	m	Surface
12/30	5,410	1,649	Gravel

Statistics (2010)
- Aircraft movements: 2,796
- Sources: Canada Flight Supplement; Environment Canada; Movements from Statistics Canada.

Sanirajak Airport (IATA: YUX, ICAO: CYUX) is located at Sanirajak, formerly Hall Beach, Nunavut, Canada, and is operated by the government of Nunavut.

== Airlines and destinations ==
Airlines	Destinations
Canadian North	Igloolik, Iqaluit

Canadian Helicopters operates flights as part of the North Warning System.
