= Kuujjuaq =

Kuujjuaq ᑰᑦᔪᐊᖅ
- Northern village municipality
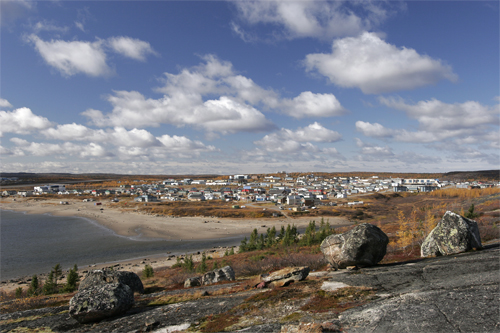
- Kuujjuaq

- Location within Quebec Location within Canada
- Coordinates (Hôtel de ville Katittavik, 400, chemin de l'Aéroport): 58°06′N 68°24′W
- Country: Canada
- Province: Quebec
- Region: Nord-du-Québec; Nunavik
- TE: Kativik
- Constituted: December 29, 1979

Government
  - Mayor: Mary Johannes
  - Federal riding: Abitibi—Baie-James—Nunavik—Eeyou
  - Prov. riding: Ungava

Area
  - Total: 385.70 km^{2} (148.92 sq mi)
  - Land: 289.97 km^{2} (111.96 sq mi)

Population (2021)
  - Total: 2,668
  - Density: 9.2/km^{2} (24/sq mi)
  - Change (2016–21): ▼3.1%
  - Dwellings: 1,253
- Time zone: UTC−05:00 (EST)
  - Summer (DST): UTC−04:00 (EDT)
- Postal code(s): J0M 1C0
- Area code: 819
- GNBC code: EJJIZ
- NTS map: 24K1 Kuujjuaq
- Website: www.nvkuujjuaq.ca

Kuujjuaq ([kuːtjuɑq]; Inuktitut: ᑰᑦᔪᐊᖅ or ᑰᔾᔪᐊᖅ, 'Great River') is a former Hudson's Bay Company outpost at the mouth of the Koksoak River on Ungava Bay that has become the largest northern village (Inuit community) in the Nunavik region of Quebec, Canada. It is the administrative capital of the Kativik Regional Government. Its population was 2,668 as of the 2021 census.

== Names ==
Kuujjuaq was founded as Fort Good Hope in 1830 but in 1831 changed its name to Fort Chimo, an anglicization of an Inuit word ᓭᒨᖅ saimuuq, meaning "Let's shake hands" and also likely to avoid confusion with Fort Good Hope operated by the Hudson's Bay Company (HBC) in the Northwest Territories. As this was a common greeting locals used with the HBC fur traders, they adopted it as the name of their trading post. A fictional account of this naming is given in the 1857 novel Ungava by R. M. Ballantyne, where it is taken from a girl character's beloved dog. On 5 February 1980, the name was changed to Kuujjuaq, the Inuit name for the Koksoak River.

It has also been known informally as Koksoak and Washgagen.

== History ==
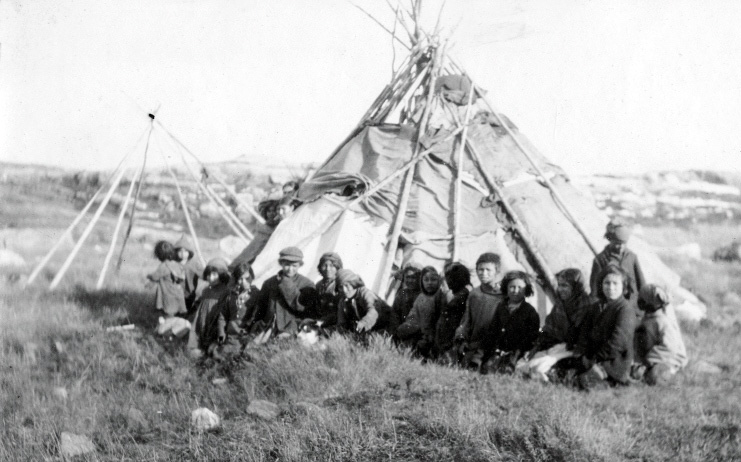
Inuit encamped near Fort Chimo (1909)

The first Europeans to have contact with local Inuit were missionaries from the Moravian Church. On August 25, 1811, after a perilous trip along the coasts of Labrador and Ungava Bay, Benjamin Gottlieb Kohlmeister and George Kmoch arrived at an Inuit camp on the east shore of the Koksoak. Their aim was to scout the area for future missions and, if possible, to convert the "Esquimaux" to Christianity. According to their journal, they found the Inuit of the Koksoak River very interested in having a Moravian mission in the area, but after reaching a little farther than "Pilgerruh" ("Pilgrim's Rest") on "Unity's Bay" they turned back for home.

Attracted by the missionaries' praise of the location, the Hudson's Bay Company established a permanent station on the east shore of the Koksoak River in 1830, at a site about 5 km (3.1 mi) downstream from the present settlement. Governor Simpson's plan was to attract trade from the Inuit of the surrounding territory as well as from the islands and ice sheets north of the bay. Its first factor was Nicol Finlayson, who sent Erland Erlandson to establish an outpost on the Wausquash; this had to be abandoned in late 1833 or early 1834. By 1833, Fort Chimo comprised seven buildings in a defensive square, principally trading in caribou hides and white fox and marten pelts. Erlandson ultimately discovered bountiful trapping far to the south in the highlands around Lake Petitsikapau; he briefly succeeded Finlayson as acting factor but was replaced when a brig delivered John McLean to his new post in 1837. Over the next four years, he succeeded in establishing an efficient riverine connection with Fort Smith on Lake Melville, but the trade at Chimo itself was so sparse that the trails they found were simply used to supply Fort Naskaupi in the rich interior. In the winter of 1840–1841, fish and game were so scarce that the agents were forced to scatter into open camps around the countryside to survive as best they could. Fort Chimo and its District of Ungava were shuttered on September 1, 1843, an HBC ship carting away the remaining men and supplies.

The fort did not reopen until 1866, when it was thought necessary to curtail the trade going to the Moravians in the area and the steamboat Labrador made resupplying the distant outpost easier. At that time, Inuit, Innu (Montagnais), and Naskapi came to trade at the post. By the 1950s, Fort Chimo included two dormitories, two warehouses, oil and salt sheds, and carpentry, cooperage, and machinist workshops. A sloop, a steamer, and outposts at the mouths of the Whale and George Rivers helped carry out the salmon catch each August, which was salted on site for use, sale, and export. The fort was usually supplied by the steamer Eric, while a smaller refrigerated steamer picked up the salmon haul.

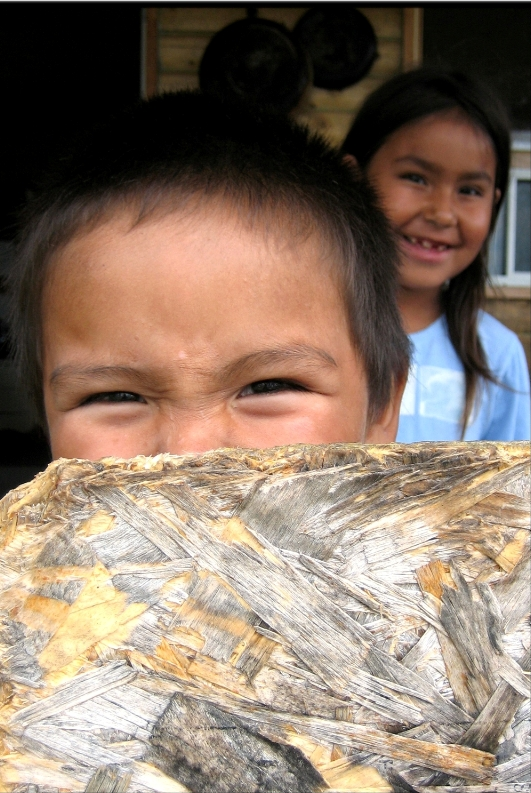
Children in Kuujjuaq

Amid the Second World War, the United States Army Air Forces (USAAF) surveyed the area from amphibious aircraft out of Gander on July 12, 1941 and established the Crystal 1 weather station on the western shore of the Koksoak on October 10, 1941. It was supplied by the United States Coast Guard. An airfield was established in the summer of 1942, although it was never used for the Crimson East's intended purpose of facilitating trans-Atlantic ferry flights. The US turned over the base to the Canadian government in 1944 and 1945, which established Naval Radio Station Chimo (call sign CFI) as part of the Canadian Supplementary Radio Activities (SUPRAD) system in 1948. Direction-finding facilities were finished and commenced operations in 1949. In 1950, it became part of the Atlantic high-frequency radio direction finding (HFDF) network after the Royal Canadian Navy and the United States Navy agreed to coordinate and standardize their detection operations. The high cost of maintaining and supplying the base, however, led to it being shuttered in late summer 1952 and its equipment and personnel moved to Frobisher Bay (now Iqaluit) on Baffin Island. The site was eventually adapted as the Kuujjuaq Airport, which now includes a Nav Canada air-traffic control facility that relays information on flights in northern Canada to Montreal.

With more Inuit settling in the area during this time to assist the base, a Catholic mission was established in 1948 and was followed by an infirmary, a school, and a weather station. The HBC outpost at Fort Chimo was closed for months of repairs in 1957 after a major fire, and the post was moved closer to the airfield in 1960. The remaining families who had still lived around the old site finally joined the larger community, establishing present-day Kuujjuaq (although it did not receive that name until 1980). The HBC store was sold to Hudson's Bay Northern Stores in 1987.

Since 1996, police services in the Kativik region, including Kuujjuaq, are provided by the Kativik Regional Police Force (KRPF). The headquarters of the KRPF are located in Kuujjuaq.

== Geography ==
Kuujjuaq lies 48 km (30 mi) upstream from Ungava Bay. Life in this community involves a close relationship with the river. Its tides regularly change the local landscape, while their rhythm strongly influences the traditional summer activities.

Although the tree line is very close, the boreal forest is present around Kuujjuaq. Patches of black spruce and larch stand in marshy valleys. Kuujjuaq also witnesses annual migrations of the George River caribou herd. These animals pass through the region throughout August and September.

== Climate ==
Kuujjuaq has a cold subarctic climate (Köppen Dfc), not far above the polar climate, but avoids that classification due to the temperate summers with daily mean temperatures of above 10 °C (50 °F). Winters are cold but by no means extreme for its latitude by Eastern Canadian standards.

The cause of the extreme swings is the effect of the Hudson Bay to its west freezing in November. This eliminates maritime moderation from westerlies that are prevalent in moderating summer temperatures. With Hudson Bay effectively becoming a landmass during the winter, Kuujjuaq ends up being subject to severely cold winds. With the Labrador Current to its south-east also being cold, winter moderation from the east is also eliminated. Although less snowfall is received compared to the more coastal Nain further south, the influence of the current contributes to a sizeable snow tally for a climate that cold. In June, Hudson Bay thaws, resulting in mild maritime air from the cold water moderating westerlies. In spite of this, Kuujjuaq being situated with a direct landmass link to its south for thousands of kilometres can contribute to warm southerlies reaching the settlement, bringing temperatures above 30 °C (86 °F). Unlike Inukjuak directly on the Hudson Bay shore, Kuujjuaq thus has a greater continental warmth impact on its summers, and consequently lies below the tree line.

During fall, Kuujjuaq's diurnal temperature variation is at its lowest, as the maritime moderation is at its strongest. Simultaneously, the Hudson Bay freezing process begins as cold builds up over the vast landmasses surrounding the bay. This renders Kuujjuaq to commonly get ice days during October, before winter begins in November and proceeds to the end of April. Kuujjuaq has a cloudy climate, as a result of the Icelandic Low influence.

Kuujjuaq has been affected by global warming in recent decades, similar to other Arctic locations. For example, December 2010 had an average high of −3 °C (27 °F), while a −4 °C (25 °F) average high was measured for March 2018. Summer has also been affected, with a 20 °C (68 °F) average high for June 2012, and a 21 °C (70 °F) average high during August 2014. Average frost free periods have also increased from 66 days over the 1951–80 period to 88 days over the 1991–2020 period.

Climate data for Kuujjuaq (Kuujjuaq Airport) WMO ID: 71906; coordinates 58°06′N 68°25′W; elevation: 39.9 m (131 ft); 1991–2020 normals, extremes 1947–present
Month	Jan	Feb	Mar	Apr	May	Jun	Jul	Aug	Sep	Oct	Nov	Dec	Year
Record high humidex	5.0	6.3	11.7	17.9	27.5	38.9	37.9	33.2	32.2	20.4	10.3	5.8	38.9
Record high °C (°F)	5.6 (42.1)	7.8 (46.0)	12.1 (53.8)	19.2 (66.6)	31.1 (88.0)	33.1 (91.6)	34.3 (93.7)	30.7 (87.3)	28.3 (82.9)	20.0 (68.0)	10.2 (50.4)	8.3 (46.9)	34.3 (93.7)
Mean daily maximum °C (°F)	−18.9 (−2.0)	−18.1 (−0.6)	−11.3 (11.7)	−3.2 (26.2)	5.7 (42.3)	13.2 (55.8)	18.1 (64.6)	16.8 (62.2)	10.6 (51.1)	3.8 (38.8)	−3.9 (25.0)	−12.2 (10.0)	0.1 (32.2)
Daily mean °C (°F)	−23.3 (−9.9)	−23.1 (−9.6)	−16.9 (1.6)	−8.4 (16.9)	1.2 (34.2)	7.8 (46.0)	12.5 (54.5)	11.8 (53.2)	6.7 (44.1)	0.8 (33.4)	−7.2 (19.0)	−16.2 (2.8)	−4.5 (23.9)
Mean daily minimum °C (°F)	−27.7 (−17.9)	−28.0 (−18.4)	−22.5 (−8.5)	−13.4 (7.9)	−3.3 (26.1)	2.4 (36.3)	6.9 (44.4)	6.6 (43.9)	2.8 (37.0)	−2.1 (28.2)	−10.5 (13.1)	−20.2 (−4.4)	−9.1 (15.6)
Record low °C (°F)	−49.8 (−57.6)	−43.9 (−47.0)	−43.9 (−47.0)	−34.1 (−29.4)	−24.7 (−12.5)	−8.3 (17.1)	−1.6 (29.1)	−1.7 (28.9)	−7.8 (18.0)	−20.0 (−4.0)	−31.1 (−24.0)	−43.9 (−47.0)	−49.8 (−57.6)
Record low wind chill	−60.4	−58.0	−55.3	−45.6	−30.6	−13.2	−5.7	−6.5	−11.9	−32.9	−42.8	−56.3	−60.4
Average precipitation mm (inches)	30.7 (1.21)	29.3 (1.15)	31.6 (1.24)	27.4 (1.08)	31.5 (1.24)	51.1 (2.01)	75.2 (2.96)	75.9 (2.99)	87.8 (3.46)	57.0 (2.24)	43.8 (1.72)	36.9 (1.45)	578.2 (22.76)
Average rainfall mm (inches)	0.0 (0.0)	0.3 (0.01)	0.2 (0.01)	3.6 (0.14)	13.5 (0.53)	47.8 (1.88)	75.3 (2.96)	75.8 (2.98)	84.9 (3.34)	34.8 (1.37)	5.1 (0.20)	1.8 (0.07)	343.2 (13.51)
Average snowfall cm (inches)	30.6 (12.0)	29.2 (11.5)	31.6 (12.4)	23.3 (9.2)	18.3 (7.2)	4.3 (1.7)	0.0 (0.0)	0.0 (0.0)	2.9 (1.1)	21.3 (8.4)	38.9 (15.3)	35.1 (13.8)	235.4 (92.7)
Average precipitation days (≥ 0.2 mm)	15.7	12.9	14.8	12.0	12.5	13.3	15.6	18.3	19.9	18.3	17.6	15.5	186.1
Average rainy days (≥ 0.2 mm)	0.12	0.15	0.42	1.8	6.5	12.5	15.3	18.3	19.2	10.6	2.6	0.92	88.3
Average snowy days (≥ 0.2 cm)	15.6	12.9	14.7	10.9	8.2	2.5	0.04	0.08	1.9	11.1	16.9	19.2	109.8
Average relative humidity (%) (at 1500 LST)	66.2	61.3	61.9	65.1	62.8	58.9	59.3	63.6	68.0	73.5	77.7	73.4	66.0
Average dew point °C (°F)	−24.9 (−12.8)	−23.6 (−10.5)	−18.3 (−0.9)	−9.8 (14.4)	−2.1 (28.2)	2.7 (36.9)	7.1 (44.8)	7.0 (44.6)	2.4 (36.3)	−2.5 (27.5)	−9.2 (15.4)	−20.1 (−4.2)	−7.6 (18.3)
Mean monthly sunshine hours	62.7	108.3	163.8	197.2	137.8	180.1	197.2	166.6	99.1	48.8	51.7	53.5	1,467.2
Source: Environment and Climate Change Canada (sun 1951–1980) (dew point at 1300 LST 1951–1980) (July maximum)

== Demographics ==
In the 2021 Census of Population conducted by Statistics Canada, Kuujjuaq had a population of 2,668 living in 973 of its 1,253 total private dwellings, a change of −3.1% from its 2016 population of 2,754. With a land area of 289.97 km^{2} (111.96 sq mi), it had a population density of 9.2/km^{2} (23.8/sq mi) in 2021.

== Transportation ==
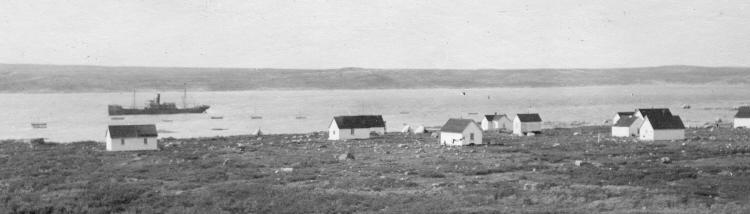
Fort Chimo (1909)

With ocean access and two runways at the Kuujjuaq Airport, Kuujjuaq is the transportation hub of the entire Nunavik region. The Avataq cargo ship delivers cargo once a year, and a new beach port has been built north of the town. There are no roads to outside the region, but there have been proposals floated by regional and provincial officials to build a road link from the south, linking to the Trans-Taïga Road and also providing access to Schefferville.

== Education ==
Kativik School Board (Kativik Ilisarniliriniq) operates two schools in the village. Pitakallak School serves students from kindergarten to grade 3, while Jaanimmarik School serves students from grade 4 to secondary 5. The village boasts a number of hotels, restaurants, stores, arts and crafts shops and a bank. In 1988, 75% of the town's 1,100 residents were native speakers of Inuktitut, 15% native francophones, and 10% native anglophones.

== Notable people ==
- John McLean, HBC trader, explorer, and author
- Sheila Watt-Cloutier, Canadian Inuit activist
- Charlie Watt, Canadian senator and founding president of the Makivik Corporation
- Johnny Ned Adams, former mayor and businessman
- Mary Simon, 30th Governor General of Canada, First Canadian Circumpolar Ambassador, Canadian former diplomat, lead negotiator for the creation of the Arctic Council, and current fellow with the Arctic Institute of North America.

== See also ==
- List of anglophone communities in Quebec

== Sources ==
- "Hudson's Bay Company: Fort Chimo", Official site, Winnipeg: Archives of Manitoba.
- Ballantyne, Robert Michael (1857), Ungava: A Tale of Esquimaux-Land, London: T. Nelson & Sons.
- Bryce, George (1900), The Remarkable History of the Hudson's Bay Company, Including That of the French Traders of North-Western Canada and of the North-West, XY, and Astor Fur Companies, Toronto: William Briggs.
- Kohlmeister, Benjamin Gottlieb; et al. (1814), Journal of a Voyage from Okkak, on the Coast of Labrador, to Ungava Bay, Westward of Cape Chudleigh, Undertaken to Explore the Coast and Visit the Esquimaux in That Unknown Region, London: Brethren's Society for the Furtherance of the Gospel among the Heathen.
