= Louis Tapardjuk =

Canadian politician (1953–2026)

MLA for Amittuq
- In office 2004–2013
- Preceded by: Enoki Irqittuq
- Succeeded by: George Qulaut

Personal details
- Born: 30 January 1953 Igloolik, Nunavut, Canada
- Died: 7 April 2026 (aged 73)
- Party: Non-partisan; Consensus government

Louis Tapardjuk (30 January 1953 – 7 April 2026) was a Canadian politician who was a Member of the Legislative Assembly (MLA) for the electoral district of Amittuq from 2004 to 2013, having won the seat in the 2004 Nunavut election. He was born in an igloo northwest of Igloolik, Nunavut. Tapardjuk served on the Executive Council of Nunavut as the Minister of Finance and Minister of Culture, Language, Elders and Youth (CLEY).

Prior to becoming an MLA in the Legislative Assembly of Nunavut, Tapardjuk was mayor of Igloolik and served as a board member of the Tunngavik Federation of Nunavut.

Tapardjuk died on 7 April 2026, at the age of 73.
