= Sanirajak =

Sanirajak ᓴᓂᕋᔭᒃ
- Hamlet
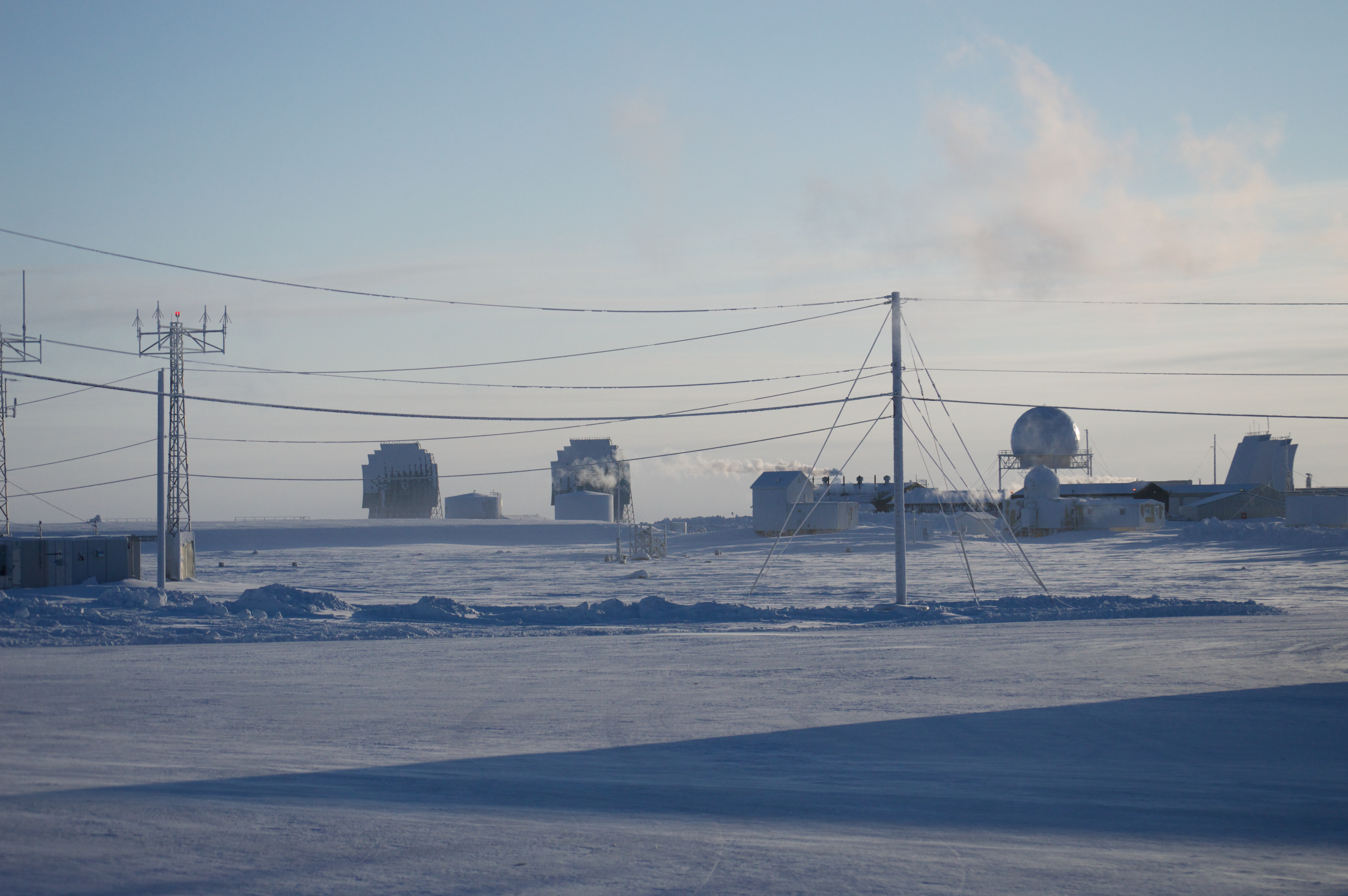
- North Warning site 1997

- Location within Nunavut Location within Canada
- Coordinates: 68°47′25″N 081°14′15″W
- Country: Canada
- Territory: Nunavut
- Region: Qikiqtaaluk
- Electoral district: Amittuq
- Settled: 1953

Government
  - Mayor: Philip Anguratsiaq
  - MLA Amittuq: Joelie Kaernerk

Area (2021)
  - Total: 16.36 km^{2} (6.32 sq mi)
- Elevation: 8 m (26 ft)

Population (2021)
  - Total: 891
  - Density: 54.5/km^{2} (141/sq mi)
- Time zone: UTC−05:00 (EST)
  - Summer (DST): UTC−04:00 (EDT)
- Canadian Postal code: X0A 0K0
- Area code: 867

Sanirajak (Inuktitut meaning the shoreline), Syllabics: ᓴᓂᕋᔭᒃ), formerly known as Hall Beach until 27 February 2020, is an Inuit settlement within the Qikiqtaaluk Region of Nunavut, Canada, approximately 69 km (43 mi) south of Igloolik.

== History ==
It was established in 1957 during the construction of a Distant Early Warning (DEW) site. Currently the settlement is home to a North Warning System (68°45′44″N 081°13′44″W) radar facility and the Sanirajak Airport.

In 1971, seven sounding rockets of the Tomahawk Sandia type were launched from Sanirajak, some reaching altitudes of 270 km (170 mi).

== Demographics ==
Federal census population history of Sanirajak
Year	Pop.	±%
1976	287	—
1981	349	+21.6%
1986	451	+29.2%
1991	526	+16.6%
1996	543	+3.2%
2001	609	+12.2%
2006	654	+7.4%
2011	736	+12.5%
2016	848	+15.2%
2021	891	+5.1%
Source: Statistics Canada

In the 2021 Canadian census conducted by Statistics Canada, Sanirajak had a population of 891 living in 197 of its 205 total private dwellings, a change of 5.1% from its 2016 population of 848. With a land area of 16.36 km^{2} (6.32 sq mi), it had a population density of 54.5/km^{2} (141.1/sq mi) in 2021.

== Geography ==
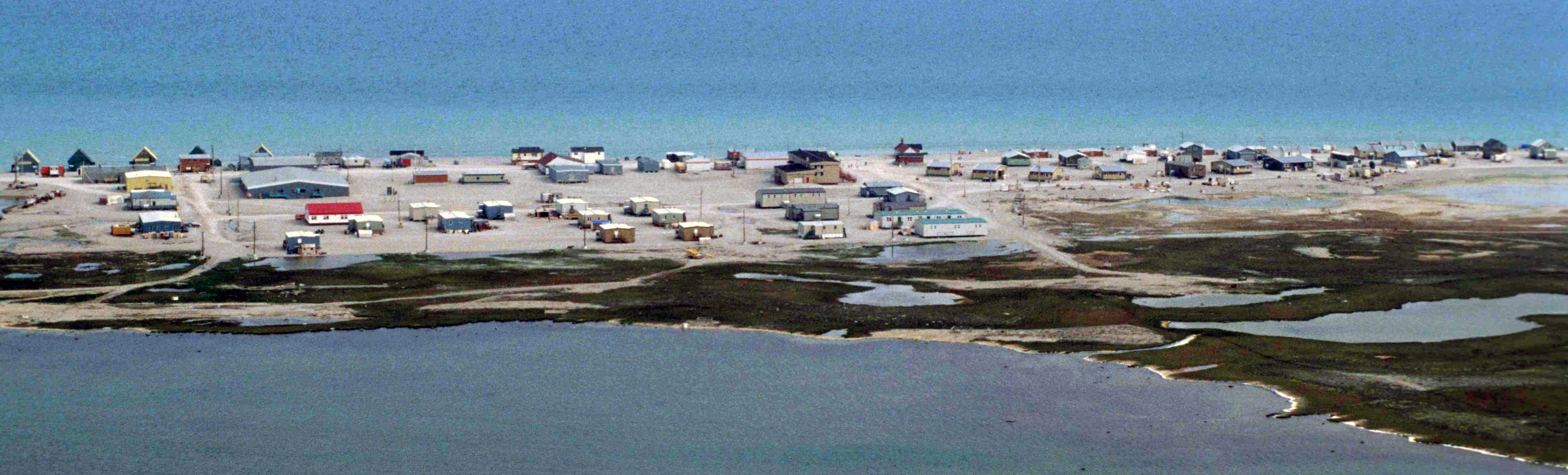
Sanirajak in 1997

=== Climate ===
Sanirajak has a tundra climate (Köppen: ETf), a polar climate sub-type under the Köppen climate classification, without the presence of trees, and iced over for most of the year. Summers are very short and cool, with chilly nights. Winters are long and extremely cold, lasting most of the year with little chance of a thaw.

Climate data for Sanirajak (Sanirajak Airport) WMO ID: 71081; coordinates 68°46′33″N 81°14′33″W; elevation: 9.1 m (30 ft); 1991–2020 normals, extremes 1957−present
Month	Jan	Feb	Mar	Apr	May	Jun	Jul	Aug	Sep	Oct	Nov	Dec	Year
Record high humidex	0.0	0.4	−0.6	2.2	4.0	21.1	27.9	28.0	14.0	4.3	0.3	−0.9	28.0
Record high °C (°F)	1.3 (34.3)	0.4 (32.7)	−0.5 (31.1)	3.3 (37.9)	4.4 (39.9)	21.1 (70.0)	23.3 (73.9)	24.8 (76.6)	14.6 (58.3)	4.2 (39.6)	0.6 (33.1)	0.4 (32.7)	24.8 (76.6)
Mean daily maximum °C (°F)	−26.7 (−16.1)	−27.9 (−18.2)	−23.5 (−10.3)	−14.2 (6.4)	−4.5 (23.9)	3.3 (37.9)	10.2 (50.4)	8.2 (46.8)	2.3 (36.1)	−4.3 (24.3)	−14.2 (6.4)	−21.0 (−5.8)	−9.4 (15.1)
Daily mean °C (°F)	−30.7 (−23.3)	−31.8 (−25.2)	−28.1 (−18.6)	−19.0 (−2.2)	−8.1 (17.4)	1.2 (34.2)	6.9 (44.4)	5.6 (42.1)	0.6 (33.1)	−7.1 (19.2)	−18.3 (−0.9)	−25.1 (−13.2)	−12.8 (9.0)
Mean daily minimum °C (°F)	−34.6 (−30.3)	−35.7 (−32.3)	−32.6 (−26.7)	−23.8 (−10.8)	−11.6 (11.1)	−0.9 (30.4)	3.5 (38.3)	2.8 (37.0)	−1.2 (29.8)	−9.8 (14.4)	−22.4 (−8.3)	−29.1 (−20.4)	−16.3 (2.7)
Record low °C (°F)	−50.0 (−58.0)	−54.1 (−65.4)	−52.5 (−62.5)	−44.1 (−47.4)	−31.1 (−24.0)	−20.6 (−5.1)	−3.3 (26.1)	−5.1 (22.8)	−16.7 (1.9)	−33.6 (−28.5)	−42.2 (−44.0)	−53.9 (−65.0)	−54.1 (−65.4)
Record low wind chill	−72.8	−71.7	−66.6	−58.0	−44.7	−32.7	−7.8	−11.7	−25.1	−49.6	−61.4	−64.6	−72.8
Average precipitation mm (inches)	6.1 (0.24)	5.9 (0.23)	8.2 (0.32)	11.6 (0.46)	15.6 (0.61)	18.2 (0.72)	21.7 (0.85)	38.4 (1.51)	30.9 (1.22)	27.1 (1.07)	16.1 (0.63)	9.6 (0.38)	209.3 (8.24)
Average rainfall mm (inches)	0.0 (0.0)	0.0 (0.0)	0.0 (0.0)	0.0 (0.0)	2.6 (0.10)	14.5 (0.57)	22.2 (0.87)	40.5 (1.59)	17.9 (0.70)	2.3 (0.09)	0.0 (0.0)	0.1 (0.00)	100.2 (3.94)
Average snowfall cm (inches)	10.4 (4.1)	8.9 (3.5)	12.2 (4.8)	18.2 (7.2)	16.5 (6.5)	10.0 (3.9)	0.0 (0.0)	1.9 (0.7)	12.4 (4.9)	33.3 (13.1)	25.4 (10.0)	14.3 (5.6)	163.3 (64.3)
Average precipitation days (≥ 0.2 mm)	8.4	6.9	8.5	10.6	10.5	9.3	10.9	12.3	12.0	15.8	12.4	10.0	127.4
Average rainy days (≥ 0.2 mm)	0.05	0.0	0.0	0.14	1.1	7.3	10.6	12.8	6.8	1.4	0.17	0.35	40.6
Average snowy days (≥ 0.2 cm)	9.7	7.2	8.5	10.7	9.6	5.2	0.05	0.95	6.6	15.2	13.7	11.0	98.3
Average afternoon relative humidity (%) (at 3pm)	68.7	68.3	70.6	76.4	84.1	87.7	80.0	81.9	84.5	87.8	80.0	73.3	78.6
Source: Environment and Climate Change Canada

== See also ==
- List of municipalities in Nunavut
- Charles Francis Hall
