= Bible translations into Inuit languages =

The complete Christian Bible has been translated into several of the Inuit languages. Ethnologue lists five major Inuit languages: Inuktitut, Inuvialuktun, Iñupiaq, Inupiatun and Greenlandic. Each of these languages has at least a New Testament translated.

== Greenland Dialect (kal) ==
Norwegian missionaries Hans and Paul Egede were the first to translate any part of the Bible into the Inuit language. Their version of the New Testament in the Greenlandic was printed in part in 1744, and as a whole in 1766.

A second translation by Otto Fabricius was published in 1794 and in 1799. Niels Giessing Wolf's revision of Fabricius' translation was published in 1827 in Copenhagen.

A third translation was translated by Johann Konrad Kleinschmidt (1768–1832) in 1822, this ran through several editions. H.F. Jorgensen's revised edition Kleinschmidt's translation was published in 1893.

Nearly three-quarters of the Old Testament was printed in the same language from 1822. It took 150 years to complete the whole Bible, but it was eventually done (prior to 1902).

The Danish Bible Society translated the whole Bible into a modern Greenlandic dialect, which was completed in 1999.

== Labrador/Eastern Canadian (ike) ==
Benjamin Kohlmeister's harmony of the gospels was published in 1810 in London by W. McDowall. Kohlmeister also translated the entire Gospel of John (mostly extracted from the harmony) and this was published later in 1810, also by W. McDowall, at the expense of the British and Foreign Bible Society. One thousand copies were published. This was very well received and Kohlmeister's translation of the other three gospels was published in 1813. C.F. Burghardt may have been involved in the 1813 publication.

A version of the Acts and Epistles prepared by the labour of the Moravian missionaries was published by the Society in 1819 and in 1826 a complete edition of the New Testament left the Society's press in London. In 1839 a revised edition of the Acts, Epistles and Book of Revelation was completed.

Psalms was published in 1826 and again in 1830, and Genesis in 1834. The complete New Testament was published again in 1840, followed by the Pentateuch which was published in London in 1847, Proverbs and the prophetical books were published in 1849. The whole Old Testament was published before 1867.

A version of the gospels and Acts was printed in Stolpen by Gustav Winterib for the British and Foreign Bible Society in 1876.

Even though the whole Bible had been translated by 1867, it had never been published as a whole book. The Moravian Church in Newfoundland and Labrador and the Canadian Bible Society partnered together to revise the whole Bible in the Labrador dialect, and to publish it as one volume. It was officially launched on January 20, 2009.

== North Slope (Alaska) (esi) ==
Roy Amaogak, together with Donald and Thelma Webster of Wycliffe Bible Translators translated the New Testament into the North Slope dialect of Inupiaq. It was published in 1967 by the American Bible Society. It was reprinted in 1992 as "Uqalugiksuat". Translation of the Old Testament continues with a team of translators in Utqiaġvik. By mid-2024, they had at least translated Jonah, Ruth, and Obadaiah.

== North West (Alaska) (esk) ==
Wilfried Zibell's translation of selected parts of the New Testament, "Agaayutim Ukałhi" was published in 1971. Wolf and Hildegard Seiler also of Wycliffe Bible Translators finished it, and the complete New Testament was published in 1997 by the International Bible Society as "Ipqitchuat Makpiġaat".

== Inuinaktun (Copper Eskimo) /Western Canadian (ikt) ==
H. Girling translated the Gospel of Mark into the Mackenzie dialect and had it published with interlinear readings and instructions for Inuinaktun speakers. This was published in 1920 by the BFBS. The note in the front of it read: "adapted to the use of the "Copper" Eskimo of Coronation Gulf by means of interlinear renderings printed in smaller type. These Eskimo should read the lower line of the alternative renderings, and, in addition, always pronounce the letter s as h, and change the final t of all plural nouns or verbs to n; e.g., in verse 1 of chapter i. 'tussanaktut' should be read as 'tussanaktun". Even with all his trouble, however, this gospel wasn't accepted by speakers of Inuinaktun.

The Four gospels and Acts were translated and published as "Godim Ukauhiit Gospelit Hitamanguyun Apostlit Havaangillu" in 1972 by the Canadian Bible Society. The Book of Ruth was also translated and published in 1979. The New Testament was published in 1983. John R. Sperry was involved in this translation.

== Eastern Arctic (ike) ==
Anglican missionary Edmund James Peck, who was a major influence pushing for Inuit to use Canadian Aboriginal syllabics as a writing system, transcribed extracts of New Testament which was published in 1878 followed by the four gospels in 1897. This was almost identical in the 1878 Labrador translation, the main, and perhaps only difference being in the orthography.

The New Testament was published in 1912 by the British and Foreign Bible Society. Psalms was published in 1917.

Modern Bible translation into the Eastern Arctic dialect began in 1978 with a translation workshop conducted by Dr. Eugene Nida of the United Bible Societies. The work was sponsored jointly by the United Bible Societies and the Anglican Diocese of the Arctic. The translation work was done by a team of Inuit Anglican ministers (Benjamin Arreak (team leader), Joshua Arreak, Jonas Allooloo, and Andrew Atagotaaluk) trained and supervised by consultants from the UBS and later the Canadian Bible Society under the leadership of the Director of Scripture Translation, Dr. Harold Fehderau. Dr. Fehderau continued the work of training the translators and consulting on the project to ensure the accuracy of the translation until his death in 1997. Their New Testament was published in 1992 (4,000 copies). Psalms, and Ruth were published first. The complete Bible was published by the Canadian Bible Society in 2012 and inaugurated in Iqaluit, Nunavut on June 3, 2012.

== Textual comparison ==
Dialect (translation)	John 3:16
Labradormiutut (Harmony of Gospels, McDowall, 1810)	Sillarsoarmiut Gudib taimak nægligiveit, Erngnetuane tunnivlugo, taipkonunga, illunatik tapsomunga okpertut assiokon̄agit, nungusoitomigle in̄ogutekarkovlugit.
Greenlandic (Wolf, 1827)	Sillársoarmiudle Gudib tajma assakigèj, ernétue tunniudlugo, tãursomunga nellinginak opertok tammardlukkonnago, nãissengitsomigle innursutiksakarkudlugo.
Labradormiutut (McDowall/BFBS, 1840)	Taimak Gudib sillaksoarmiut nægligiveit, Ernetuane tunnilugo, illunatik okpertut tapsomunga, assiokonnagit nungusuitomigle innogutekarkovlugit.
Greenlandic, (Kleinschmidt, 1851)	Sillarsúb innuee Gudib taima assakigei, Ernelue tunniullugo taukkonunga, tamarmik taursomunga opertut tammarkonnagit, nãksaungitsomigle innursútekarkollugit.
Labradormiutut, (Stolpen, 1878)	Imâk Gûdib sillaksoarmiut nagligivait, Ernetuane tunnilugo, illûnatik okpertut tâpsomunga assiokonnagit, nungusuitomigle inôguteкarкovlugit.
Greenlandic (Jorgensen, 1893)	mássa silamiut Gûtip taima asagamigit ernitue túniúpa, nalingínaк táussumúnga ugpertoк támarкunago, nâgssáungitsumigdle inũssuteкarкuvdlugo.
East Arctic/Inuktitut (Peck, 1897)	ᐃᒫᒃ ᒎᑎᐸ ᓯᓛᒃᕈᐋᖕᒥᐆᑦ ᓂᒃᓕᒋᕓᑦ, ᐃᑦᓂᑑᐋᓂ ᑑᓂᓘᒍ, ᐃᓘᓅᑎᒃ ᐅᒃᐱᒃᑑᑦ ᑖᐸᓱᒨᖕᒑ ᐋᓯᐅᑯᓈᒋᑦ, ᓅᖕᒎᓱᐃᑐᒥᒃᓕ ᐃᓄᒎᑎᑳᑦᑯᕙᓘᒋᑦ.
East Arctic/Inuktitut (Peck, 1897); Latin transcription	Imaak Guutipa silaakruaangmioot nikligivait, itnituuaani tuuniluugu, iluunuutik ukpiktuut taapasumuunggaa aasiukunaagit, nuungguusuitumikli inuguutikaatkuvaluugit.
Greenlandic (Unknown edition)	Silamiut Guutip ima asatigai ernitui tunniullugu kinaluunniit taassumunnga uppertoq tammaqqunagu, naassaanngitsumilli innuussuteqaqqullugu.
Labradormiutut, (København 1961)	Silamiúme Gûtip ima asatigai ernitue túniutdlugo kinalunît tàussumúnga ugpertoк tàmarкunago, nâgssàungitsumigdle inũssuteкarкuvdlugo.
North Slope Iñupiaq (American Bible Society 1992)	God-im piviuttaġivaiłługich nunam iñuŋi aitchuutigiŋagaa Iġñitualuni, kiñaliqaa ukpiqtuaq iġñiŋanun tammaquŋił̣ł̣ugu aglaan iñnuggutiqaquvlugu isuitchuamik.
Northwest Alaska/Kotzebue (International Bible Society 1997)	Agaayutim nunam iñui piqpagivagitḷugich, Iġñitualuni aatchuutiginiġaa. Kisupayaaq ukpiqsrił̣ikun turviñiktuaq ilaanik tuquyumiñaitchuq, aglaan isruitchuamik iñuugisiruq.
Greenlandic (Danish Bible Society 1999)	Guutimmi silarsuaq ima asatigaa ernituani tunniussimallugu taassumunnga uppertoq kinaluunniit tammaqqunagu naassaanngitsumilli inooqqullugu.
Labrador Inuttitut Heritage Bible (Canadian Bible Society 2008)	Imâk Gûdib silaᴋsoarmiut nagligivait, Ernetuane tunilugo, ilûnnatik okpertut tâpsomunga asioᴋonagit, nungusuitomigle inôguteᴋarᴋovlugit.
Inuktitut/East Arctic (Canadian Bible Society 2012)	ᑏᒫᒃ ᑕᕝᕙ ᒎᑎᐅᑉ ᓯᓚᖅᔪᐊᕐᖕᒥᐅᑦ ᓇᒡᓕᒋᕖᑦ ᐃᕐᖕᓂᑐᐊᓂ ᑐᓂᖕᒪᒍ, ᓇᓪᓕᐊᑦ ᑖᑦᓱᒧᖓ ᐅᒃᐱᖅᑐᖅ ᐊᓯᐅᖁᓇᒍ ᓄᖑᓱᐃᑦᑐᒥᒡᓕ ᐃᓅᓯᖃᖁᓪᓗᒍ.
Inuktitut/East Arctic (Canadian Bible Society 2012); Latin transcription	Tiimaak tavva Guutiup silaqjuarngmiut nagligiviit irngnituani tuningmagu, nalliat taatsumunga ukpiqtuq asiuqunagu nungusuittumigli inuusiqaqullugu.
