= James Nashak =

Canadian Anglican priest and Bible translator (born 1946)

The Very Reverend James Nashak
- Born: 1946 (age 79–80); Prince of Wales Island, Northwest Territories, Canada
- Occupation: Anglican priest
- Known for: Translation of the Complete Bible in Inuktitut

James Nashak (born 1946) is a Canadian Anglican priest and Bible translator. An Inuk priest in the Diocese of the Arctic, Nashak was part of the translation team for the first full translation of the Bible into Inuktitut.

Nashak was born on Prince of Wales Island and grew up near Resolute Bay. Orphaned at a young age, Nashak was educated at residential schools in Inuvik, Northwest Territories and Churchill, Manitoba. As a young man, he studied oil drilling in Edmonton, Alberta and returned to the Arctic Archipelago in 1969 to work in oilfield exploration with Panarctic Oils' Chateau Arctic project.

Nashak trained for ordained ministry in the 1970s at the Diocese of the Arctic's Arthur Turner Training School in Pangnirtung under Michael Gardener. Starting in 1978, Nashak joined a small translation team that produced the first complete Bible to be translated into Inuktitut. He and Ben Arreak, Andrew Atagotaaluk and Jonas Allooloo would gather once or twice a year for a month or two at a time to work together on the translation. The translation work was finished in 2002, and after editing and review, the Bible was published by the Canadian Bible Society in 2012 and unveiled at St. Jude's Cathedral in Iqaluit.

In 1999, Nashak presided over funeral services and community grieving in Kangiqsualujjuaq, Quebec, after an avalanche killed nine people celebrating New Year's Day. After serving as dean of North Baffin at Igloolik, Nunavut, in 2001, he relocated to Kuujjuaq, Quebec, where he worked as a social worker.
