= Michael Gardener (priest) =

British-Canadian priest (born 1930)

The Very Reverend Michael Gardener CM ONu
- Dean of the Arctic
- Church: Anglican Church of Canada
- Diocese: Arctic
- Successor: Roger Briggs
- Other post: Rector of St. Jude's Cathedral

Orders
- Ordination: 5 June 1955 (deacon); 1957 (priest) by Bertram Simpson (1955)

Personal details
- Born: September 1930 (age 95) New Malden, Surrey, England
- Spouse: Margaret Porter Gardener (m. 1956, d. 2021)
- Children: 4, including Pat Angnakak
- Education: University of Reading; Wycliffe Hall, Oxford

Michael George Gardener (born September 1930) is a British-born Canadian Anglican priest. He migrated to the Canadian Arctic as a missionary and lived there for more than 60 years, spending more than four decades in ministry in the region, including several years as dean of St. Jude's Cathedral. He became a fluent speaker of Inuktitut and launched the Diocese of the Arctic's Arthur Turner Training School to train up indigenous leadership for the diocese. He was recognized with the Order of Canada and the Order of Nunavut for his services to the people of the Arctic region.

== Early life ==
Gardener was born in 1930 in New Malden, Surrey, to George Edwin Gardener and May Eleanor Gardener (née King). Although his family was non-religious, Gardener was inspired as a boy by the life of David Livingstone as a missionary in Africa. However, Gardener decided he wanted to serve in a cold environment.

He was educated at the University of Reading, where he graduated BA in 1953 in psychology, and then the same year joined Wycliffe Hall, Oxford, to train for the priesthood.

== Ministry in Canada ==
Gardener was ordained a deacon of the Church of England in the Diocese of Southwark on Trinity Sunday, 1955. A month later, he and his fiancée, Margaret Porter, migrated from London to Canada to serve as missionaries. Because they were not married, they were given assignments in different places, with Gardener in Lake Harbour and Porter in Pangnirtung. Gardener arrived in Lake Harbour on the sealift and immediately began work, including preaching in Inuktitut without translation. He had taught himself to read syllabics prior to arriving and copied out Bible verses for his sermon even though he could not yet understand Inuktitut.

Gardener and Porter married in September 1956 on board a ship in Frobisher Bay and returned to Lake Harbour for five years. Gardener was ordained a priest in the Diocese of the Arctic in 1957.

The Gardeners' time in Lake Harbour predated the forced resettlement of Canadian Inuit from outlying camps into towns and hamlets, and Gardener's ministry involved extensive trips by dog sled to visit remote camps. He also learned to hunt seals, build igloos and travel on sea ice.

In 1961 the Gardeners moved to Cape Dorset, where they trained catechists, taught school classes and helped establish social services as the town grew. They moved to Pangnirtung in 1970. It was there that Gardener established the clergy training school of the Diocese of the Arctic. In 1981, after the igloo-shaped St. Jude's Cathedral was completed in Iqaluit, the Gardeners were invited to relocate there. Services in both English and Inuktitut attracted a combined 400 people and the Gardeners also ran Sunday school, youth programmes and counselling services, supporting Nunavummiut dealing with substance abuse or suicidal tendencies. In addition to his church work, he was a social activist in Iqaluit, serving on the Adult Justice Committee and in the Northwest Territories elders society. Gardener retired from full-time work in 1996—estimating that he baptized thousands of Inuit during his four decades as a priest in the Arctic—and he continued to serve in part-time ministry roles and on the Workers' Compensation Board.

=== Clergy education ===
Starting in Pangnirtung, Gardener initiated the first theological training for indigenous clergy in the Arctic, which would eventually become known as the Arthur Turner Training School and be based in Iqaluit. Among his pupils was Andrew Atagotaaluk, who became the first Inuk to serve as bishop of the Arctic, along with future suffragan bishop Ben Arreak, Jonas Allooloo and James Nashak, all of whom with Atagotaaluk translated the Bible into Inuktitut.

"My wish was always to do myself out of job," Gardener told the Anglican Journal late in life. "When I first arrived, there were no ordained Inuit clergy in the North, but now there are more Inuit clergy than non-Inuit."

== Later life ==
The Gardeners were retired in Iqaluit for several years, where they remained active in ministry.

In 2009, Gardener was the subject of news coverage when was asked to leave the Larga Baffin boarding house in Ottawa and given a CA$34,000 bill for a nine-month stay while Margaret received cancer treatment. Gardener, along with other non-Inuit residents of Nunavut, had stayed at Larga Baffin before, but the home said there was no longer capacity for non-Inuit guests. While the bill was later cut in half, the action outraged some residents of Iqaluit, who expressed concerns that the Nunavut government—which funds stays at Larga Baffin through the Non-Insured Health Benefits (NIHB) program for Inuit who are beneficiaries of the Nunavut Land Claims Agreement—discriminated against Gardener on the basis of his race. Former Commissioner of Nunavut Piita Irniq said that the action "sounds to me like discriminating against non-Inuit." The government of Nunavut said race was not a factor in the billing decision but that the NIHB funding was only intended to cover Inuit and other First Nations people. After the uproar, however, the government said Gardener would not have to pay the bill, finding other sources to cover the expenses.

After 61 years in the Arctic, the Gardeners moved to Ottawa in 2016 to obtain live-in memory care for Margaret. She died there in 2021 from Alzheimer's disease.

== Awards ==
Gardener was named a member of the Order of Canada in 2007 for services to northern communities. He was one of the first three people to be inducted into the Order of Nunavut in 2011.

== Personal life ==
The Gardeners had three daughters and one adopted son, as well as nine grandchildren, 16 great-grandchildren and one great-great-grandchild as of 2021. Their children remained in the Arctic and became active in civic leadership. Their daughter Pat Gardener Angnakak became a member of the Legislative Assembly of Nunavut, as did his son-in-law David Akeeagok, who also served as deputy premier. His grandson P.J. Akeeagok was premier of Nunavut from 2021 to 2025.
