= Arreak =

Arreak (also spelled Aariak) is an Inuit surname. Notable people with this surname include:

- Eva Aariak (born 1955), Canadian politician, premier of Nunavut (2008–2013) and commissioner of Nunavut (since 2021)
- Ben Arreak (born 1947), Canadian Anglican bishop and Bible translator
- James Arreak (born 1952), Canadian politician
- Joshua Arreak, Canadian politician and Bible translator
- Adam Arreak Lightstone, Canadian politician
