= Idlout =

Idlout is a surname. Notable people with the surname include:

- Joseph Idlout (1912/13–1968), Canadian Inuit
- Lori Idlout (born 1973/74), Canadian politician, granddaughter of Joseph
- Lucie Idlout (born 1972/73), Canadian singer-songwriter, granddaughter of Joseph
- Paul Idlout (1935–2025), Canadian Anglican bishop, son of Joseph
