= Complete Bible in Inuktitut =

First translation of the Bible into Inuktitut by native speakers

- The hardback edition of the Inuktitut Bible
- Language: Inuktitut
- OT published: 2012
- NT published: 1991
- Complete Bible published: 2012
- Authorship: Jonas Allooloo, Ben Arreak, Joshua Arreak, Andrew Atagotaaluk, James Nashak
- Translation type: Functional equivalence
- Revision: 2022
- Publisher: Canadian Bible Society
- Copyright: Copyright © Canadian Bible Society, 2012, 2021.
- Religious affiliation: Protestantism
- Webpage: live.bible.is/bible/IKECBS
- Genesis 1:1–3 ᐱᒋᐊᕐᓂᕐᒥ ᒎᑎ ᐱᓐᖑᕐᑎᑦᓯᓚᐅᕐᐳᖅ ᕿᓚᖕᓂᒃ ᓄᓇᕐᔪᐊᕐᒥᒡᓗ. 2ᓄᓇᕐᔪᐊᕐᓕ ᐋᖅᑭᒃᓯᒪᓚᐅᓐᖏᓚᖅ ᓱᓇᑕᖃᕋᓂᓗ, ᐃᑎᔪᕐᔪᐊᒥᒃ ᑖᕐᑐᐊᓘᓪᓗᓂ; ᒎᑎᐅᓪᓗ ᐊᓂᕐᓂᖓ ᐃᖏᕐᕋᓚᐅᕐᐳᖅ ᐃᒫᓘᑉ ᖁᓛᒍᑦ. 3ᒎᑎᓗ ᐅᖃᕐᐳᖅ, “ᖃᐅᒪᔪᖃᕐᓕ” ᖃᐅᒪᔪᒥᒡᓗ ᓴᖅᑭᑦᑐᖃᕐᐳᖅ. John 3:16 ᒎᑎᐅᑉ ᓯᓚᕐᔪᐊᕐᒥᐅᑦ ᓇᒡᓕᒋᓪᓚᕆᒃᑲᒥᒋᑦ ᐃᕐᓂᑐᐊᓂ ᑐᓂᓚᐅᕐᐹ, ᑕᒪᕐᒥᒃ ᑖᑦᓱᒧᖓ ᐅᒃᐱᕐᑐᑦ ᐊᓯᐅᖁᓇᒋᑦ ᓄᖑᓱᐃᑦᑐᒥᒡᓕ ᐃᓅᓯᖃᖁᓪᓗᒋᑦ.

The first complete Bible translation into Eastern Canadian Inuktitut began in 1978 and concluded in 2012 with the publication of the full Bible. Sponsored by the Canadian Bible Society and the Anglican Church of Canada, the translation was done by five Inuit Anglican clergy—Jonas Allooloo, Ben Arreak, Joshua Arreak, Andrew Atagotaaluk and James Nashak—who would gather for at least one month per year to work on the project with the support of Eugene Nida, a prominent linguist and Bible translator. It was the first complete Bible translated into Inuktitut syllabics and the first translation of the Bible into an indigenous Canadian language done by native speakers.

The translation replaced clunky and sometimes inaccurate translations by non-native missionaries. Translated using a functional equivalence methodology, the translation uses Inuit idiom to express biblical concepts that are hard to describe in Inuktitut, describing a shepherd as the tender of a sled dog team, for example. It makes use of extensive footnotes to describe the biblical nuances of concepts like the many kinds of trees in the Bible for readers of a language that has no native word for tree.

The New Testament was completed in 1991 and the Old Testament in 2002. The full Bible was published in 2012 and has been made available in digital and audio formats in addition to the 1,300-page print edition. The Inuktitut Bible has been described as an important factor in helping to preserve the language's use in Nunavut and has been used to train text-to-speech applications for the Inuktitut language.

== History ==
The development of written Inuktitut is closely tied to Christian missionary activity among the Inuit. Inuit in Labrador had access to the Bible as early as the 1700s due to the work of German missionaries, although it was rendered in Latin script. Anglican missionary Edmund Peck translated the first Bible texts in Inuktitut syllabics, finishing the New Testament in 1912 and the Psalms in 1917. In the early to mid-20th-century, Anglican missionary Jack Turner translated several more Old Testament books, revised Peck's New Testament and began an Inuktitut Book of Common Prayer.

However, early translations included several clunky renderings and outright errors, such as having the Apostle Paul use the term for cutting his mouth open instead of opening his mouth to speak, translating "love" using the Inuktitut word for "pity", or using "something for doing the act dogs do when pulling a sled" to describe a horse. To remedy these shortcomings, Bishop of the Arctic John Sperry convened several Inuit clergy for a workshop with prominent linguist and Bible translator Eugene Nida. According to Allooloo, Nida believed that western missionaries would not be able to render the biblical texts as well as native speakers: "You may have learned the language well, but you'll never learn to think the way these people do."

A total of five translators worked on the project, which was a joint effort of the Canadian Bible Society and the Anglican Church of Canada ultimately costing CA$1.75 million. Nida appointed team leader Ben Arreak along with Jonas Allooloo, Andrew Atagotaaluk and James Nashak to work on the project; Joshua Arreak joined the team later. They worked on the project one to two months of the year, gathering twice a year in various Arctic communities or at the Canadian Bible Society headquarters in Kitchener, Ontario. During the process of the translation, the translators received access to Paratext software at the Kitchener headquarters. The software provides original Hebrew and Greek texts and allows on-screen editing and analysis along with the retention of notes, accelerating the translation process. Each member of the team would translate a book of the Bible, and then others would assess and edit it, along with Canadian Bible Society staff with knowledge of Greek and Hebrew.

The New Testament was completed in 1991. Arreak and Allooloo continued to work on the Old Testament, and a first draft was completed in 2002. Following editing and production, the full Inuktitut Bible was formally dedicated at St. Jude's Cathedral in Iqaluit on June 3, 2012, a service that also marked the dedication of the new cathedral building following its reconstruction after a fire and the consecration of David Parsons as bishop of the Arctic. It was the first Bible translation done by native speakers of Inuktitut, as well as the first Bible translation into any indigenous language done in Canada by native speakers. It was also the first complete translation of the Bible into Inuktitut syllabics.

== Versions and revisions ==
The complete Inuktitut Bible encompasses spanned 1,300 pages. The initial print run of the Bible was 5,100.

In addition to print, the Inuktitut Bible is available through the YouVersion app and the Digital Bible Library. The audio recording of the New Testament was released in fall 2023, with the Old Testament audio version in progress as of 2026. A children's Bible version is also available. In 2022, it became was the fourth Bible version, and the first non-English version, made available through the Prayer Book Society of Canada's Common Prayer Canada app.

Led by Allooloo, translators began revising the 2012 version in 2016. As of 2026, the Canadian Bible Society revision is about halfway completed.

== Literary attributes ==
Nida was considered the father of "functional equivalence", a translation philosophy in which the biblical texts are rendered in language that is most understandable to the reader in the target language; this is different from formal equivalence, where the structure and vocabulary of the source language is retained as much as possible. Arctic flora and fauna and the Inuit lifestyle posed obstacles for the translators in rendering concepts in the biblical texts that were foreign to many Inuktitut speakers. Inuktitut has no word for sheep, which created a challenge for translating central concepts like Jesus as the Lamb of God and the Good Shepherd, according to Peter Kulchyski of the University of Manitoba. The term "shepherd" was rendered using the term for someone who tends a team of sled dogs. Concepts related to the ceremonial law of ancient Israel and Davidic kingship were difficult to render.. "Queen" became "the wife of the big boss" and "temple" became "the igloo of worship". More abstract concepts like "grace" and "peace" did not have Inuit cognates and required the translators to conjure the concepts using Inuktitut phrases that described them. For example, "grace" was translated using two Inuktitut words to express the concept as "God's kindness that enables us."

Because trees do not grow in the Arctic, Inuktitut has no native word for tree. With more than 30 types of trees referenced in the Bible, the translators chose to use one general term for "tree" with explanations in the copious footnotes. For other terms with no Inuktitut equivalent (such as "pomegranate" or "camel"), the translators borrowed the English term. Concepts that were similar but not identical to a term in Inuit were rendered with a brief explanatory note, such as "dove, like ptarmigan".

Other biblical concepts translated well to Inuit culture. According to the University Manitoba's Chris Trott, the Hebrew ruach (רוּחַ), or "spirit," can be conveyed in Inuktitut with anirniq (ᐊᓂᕐᓂᖅ), or "breath". The Deuteronomic principle of life for following God's law and consequences for breaking God's law also aligned with Inuit beliefs. Arreak and Allooloo said the Old Testament was easier to translate because the Inuit and Hebrew oral traditions were aligned.

== Reception ==
The initial print run of the Bible sold out. Allooloo described people weeping upon receiving their copies of the Bible in their native tongue.

Scholars ascribed positive effects to the availability of a complete Bible. According to Trott, having access to the full Bible in the native language would "solidify native control of the church and provide reading material to adults in Inuktitut to a region that is short of it." Helmut Wiens of the Canadian Bible Society said he expected the availability of a Bible would also help with the preservation of Inuktitut in Nunavut and other places where the language is spoken.

The audio recordings of the Inuktitut Bible were used to train Microsoft Translator's Inuktitut text-to-speech capability, which was unveiled in 2024.

== See also ==
- Bible translations into Inuit languages
