= John Main (politician) =

Canadian politician

The Honourable John Main MLA
- ᐋᕐᓗᖅ ᒪᐃᓐ
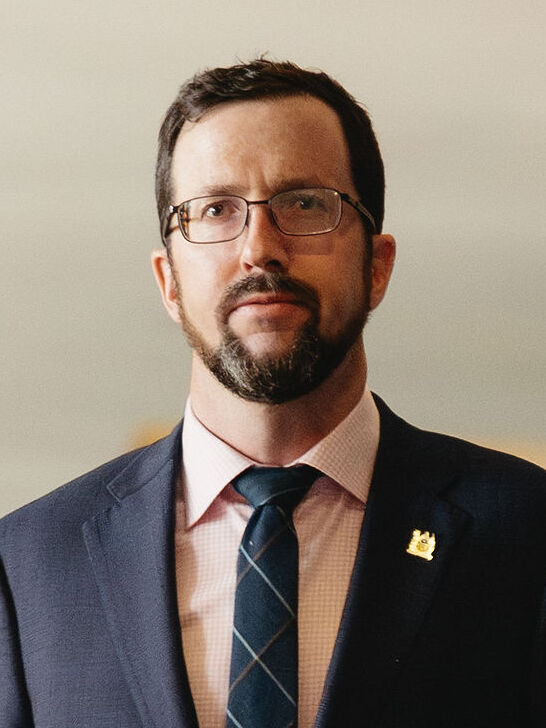
- Main in 2026

7th Premier of Nunavut
- Incumbent
- Assumed office November 20, 2025
- Commissioner: Eva Aariak
- Deputy: George Hickes
- Preceded by: P.J. Akeeagok

Minister of Finance
- Incumbent
- Assumed office November 20, 2025
- Premier: Himself
- Preceded by: Adam Lightstone

Member of the Legislative Assembly of Nunavut for Arviat North-Whale Cove
- Incumbent
- Assumed office October 30, 2017
- Preceded by: George Kuksuk

Minister of Health and Minister responsible for Suicide Prevention and the Qulliq Energy Corporation
- In office November 19, 2021 – November 20, 2025
- Premier: P.J. Akeeagok
- Preceded by: Monica Ell-Kanayuk
- Succeeded by: Janet Brewster (Health); Gwen Healey Akearok (Qulliq Energy Corporation)

Personal details
- Born: March 7, 1980 (age 46)
- Party: Independent (Consensus government)
- Spouse: Amanda Hanson
- Children: 3
- Education: Mount Allison University (BEc)
- Website: Website of the Premier

John Main (Inuktitut: ᐋᕐᓗᖅ ᒪᐃᓐ; born March 7, 1980) is a Canadian politician who has served as the seventh premier of Nunavut since 2025. He is the first non-Inuk to serve as premier. He was elected to the Legislative Assembly of Nunavut in the 2017 Nunavut general election, and represents the electoral district of Arviat North-Whale Cove.

== Early life and career ==
John Main was raised in Arviat, Nunavut. In 2002, he graduated from Mount Allison University with a degree in economics.

Prior to entering politics, he worked as a television reporter for the CBC News' northern bureau, as an economic development officer with the Municipality of Arviat, and as a regional business officer with the Kitikmeot Inuit Association. He is a past president of the Kivalliq Chamber of Commerce and a former member of the board of directors of the Nunavut Development Corporation.

== Political career ==
Main was elected to the Legislative Assembly in 2017, defeating incumbent MLA George Kuksuk. After being acclaimed to a second term in 2021, he was appointed Minister of Health and Minister responsible for Suicide Prevention and the Qulliq Energy Corporation in P.J. Akeeagok's Cabinet. Main was re-elected in the 2025 Nunavut general election, defeating Tony Uluadluak. In the 2025 leadership forum, he was elected as Premier by the Legislative Assembly, defeating David Akeeagok. As premier, Main also serves as the Minister of Finance and Intergovernmental Affairs.

== Personal life ==
He is married with three children. Main speaks fluent English and Inuktitut.

== Electoral history ==
=== 2025 election ===
2025 Nunavut general election
Name	Vote	%
John Main	229	57%
Tony Uluadluak	173	43%
Total Ballots	405	100%
Voter Turnout 49.57%	Rejected Ballots 3	

=== 2021 election ===
2021 Nunavut general election
Name	Vote	%
John Main	Acclaimed	

=== 2017 election ===
2017 Nunavut general election
Name	Vote	%
John Main	408	78.0%
George Kuksuk	115	22.0%
Total Valid Ballots	523	100%
Voter Turnout 78.06%	Rejected Ballots 0	
