= Blacklead =

Blacklead may refer to:

- Graphite, also known as "black lead"
  - Mixed with oil or grease as a finish for stoves
- Blacklead, another name for the Plumbago drawing style and medium
- Blacklead Island, Nunavut, Canada

Black residue left from chimney smoke, cooking fires, etc. "...And the half- washed out traces of smut and blacklead that tattooed her countenance." Nicholas Nickleby, Charles Dickens
