= Roger Briggs (priest) =

English-born Canadian priest (1936–2024)

The Very Reverend Roger Briggs
- Dean of the Arctic
- Church: Anglican Church of Canada
- Diocese: Arctic
- Predecessor: Michael Gardener
- Successor: Paul Idlout
- Other post: Rector of St. Jude's Cathedral

Personal details
- Born: 1936 Horsforth, West Yorkshire, England
- Died: June 27, 2024 (aged 87) Comox, British Columbia, Canada
- Spouse: Carole Wagstaff
- Children: 3
- Education: London College of Divinity

Roger Edward Briggs (1936 – June 27, 2024) was a British-Canadian Anglican priest. He spent most of his career in the Anglican Church of Canada as a missionary in the Diocese of the Arctic, including service as dean of the Arctic and rector of St. Jude's Cathedral in Iqaluit.

== Early life and education ==
Briggs was born in Horsforth, West Yorkshire, in 1936. He studied at the London College of Divinity, graduating in 1961 and migrating to Canada to serve as a missionary in the Arctic. He married Surrey-born Carole Wagstaff in 1962. The Briggses had three children.

== Clergy career ==
Briggs began his ordained ministry in Great Whale River, Quebec, a community of Cree and Inuit on Hudson Bay. He later served in Churchill, Manitoba and Puvirnituq, Quebec. He became an Inuktitut speaker during his years pastoring among Inuit. From 1974 to 1978, he was rector of Holy Trinity Church in Yellowknife.

After 17 years in the Arctic, Briggs relocated to Ottawa, where he led a weekly service in Inuktitut at St. George's Anglican Church and was chaplain for indigenous people in the Diocese of Ottawa. As rector of All Saints, Sandy Hill, he helped establish a day hospice ministry.

== Later life ==
Carole Briggs died of cancer in 1994 at the age of 55. In 1995, Briggs accepted an offer to return to the Arctic as dean and rector of St. Jude's Cathedral in Iqaluit.

He retired as dean of St. Jude's in 2000 and returned to Ottawa. He helped to establish an Inuit congregation in Ottawa at St. Margaret's Vanier, which was at the time the only Inuit Anglican church in Canada outside of the Arctic. In 2002, Briggs was awarded a Queen Elizabeth II Golden Jubilee Medal for "outstanding and exemplary contributions to their communities or to Canada as a whole."

Briggs died on June 27, 2024, in Comox, British Columbia.
