= Arthur Turner Training School =

The Arthur Turner Training School (ATTS) is a theological school of the Anglican Diocese of the Arctic based in Iqaluit, Nunavut, Canada. It educates and prepares candidates for ordained ministry as well as laypeople for service in the Canadian North. Established in 1970 in Pangnirtung, it has been based at St. Jude's Cathedral in Iqaluit since 2016.

Coordinates: 63.7474 N, -68.5161 W

== Notable people ==
=== Faculty and staff ===
- Michael Gardener, former principal
- Ann Martha Keenainak, instructor and examining chaplain
- Jared Osborn, instructor
- Alexander Pryor, instructor and examining chaplain
- Joey Royal, former director

=== Alumni ===
- Jonas Allooloo, dean of the Arctic and Inuktitut Bible translator
- Ben Arreak, suffragan bishop of the Arctic and Inuktitut Bible translator
- Joshua Arreak, mayor of Pond Inlet and Inuktitut Bible translator
- Andrew Atagotaaluk, bishop of the Arctic and Inuktitut Bible translator
- Paul Idlout, suffragan bishop of the Arctic
- Annie Ittoshat, suffragan bishop of the Arctic
- Ann Martha Keenainak, suffragan bishop of the Arctic
- James Nashak, Inuktitut Bible translator
- Lucy Netser, suffragan bishop of the Arctic
