= Chris Williams (bishop) =

English-born Canadian Anglican bishop (1936–2026)

The Right Reverend Chris Williams
- Bishop of the Arctic
- Church: Anglican Church of Canada
- Diocese: Arctic
- In office: 1991–2002
- Predecessor: John Sperry
- Successor: Andrew Atagotaaluk
- Previous post: Bishop suffragan of the Arctic (1987–1991)

Orders
- Ordination: 1960 (diaconate); 1962 (priesthood)
- Consecration: 1987

Personal details
- Born: 22 May 1936 Sale, Cheshire, England
- Died: 16 May 2026 (aged 89) Yellowknife, Northwest Territories, Canada
- Spouse: Rona Aitken
- Children: 2
- Education: University of Manchester, Cranmer Hall, Durham

John Christopher Richard Williams (22 May 1936 – 16 May 2026) was an English-born Canadian Anglican bishop. He was bishop of the Arctic in the Anglican Church of Canada at the end of the 20th century and the beginning of the 21st. After his training and ordination in England, Williams spent 42 years in ministry in Canada, serving as a parish priest before his elevation to the episcopate. He presided over the growth of indigenous Inuit leadership in the diocese.

== Early life and education ==
Williams was born on 22 May 1936 in Sale in what was then Cheshire. He was educated at Manchester Grammar School, Manchester University. As a student, he saw a ceramic igloo-shaped coin bank in a dormitory and became curious about it. The bank turned out to be a fundraising display for the Diocese of the Arctic. As a result, Williams pursued missionary work in the Canadian Arctic, shelving plans to pursue a career in advertising and studying Inuktitut in preparation for life among the Inuit.

== Ordained ministry ==
Following his studies at Cranmer Hall, Durham, Williams was ordained a deacon in 1960 and a priest in 1962. In 1960, he arrived as a 24-year-old missionary in Kugluktuk and he spent the next decade based in Sugluk, Quebec, where he met and married his wife, Rona Aitken, a missionary nurse from Scotland. They had two children. In the 1970s, Williams served in Cape Dorset and Baker Lake, where he was also archdeacon of Keewatin. During his ministry among the Inuit, he received the nickname Supuuktutilik, "the man with a pipe".

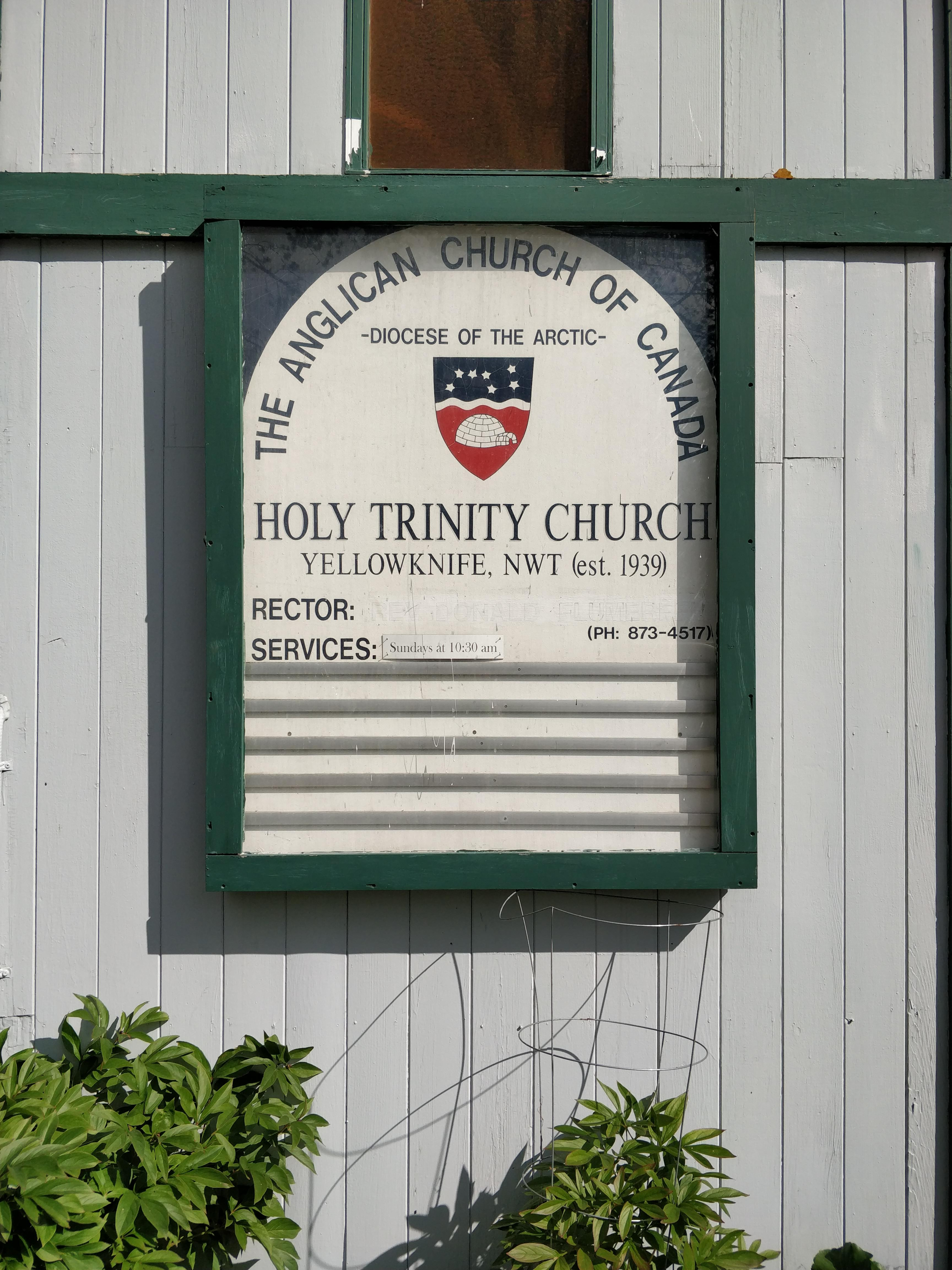
Holy Trinity Church in Yellowknife

In 1978, Williams and his family moved to Yellowknife, where he was priest in charge at Holy Trinity Church and where he presided over a physical expansion of the church building and the addition of an automated carillon. Williams was elected suffragan bishop of the Arctic and consecrated in 1987. In 1990 he became coadjutor bishop and succeeded John Sperry as diocesan bishop in 1991. Williams assisted with the effort to translate the Old Testament into Inuktitut.

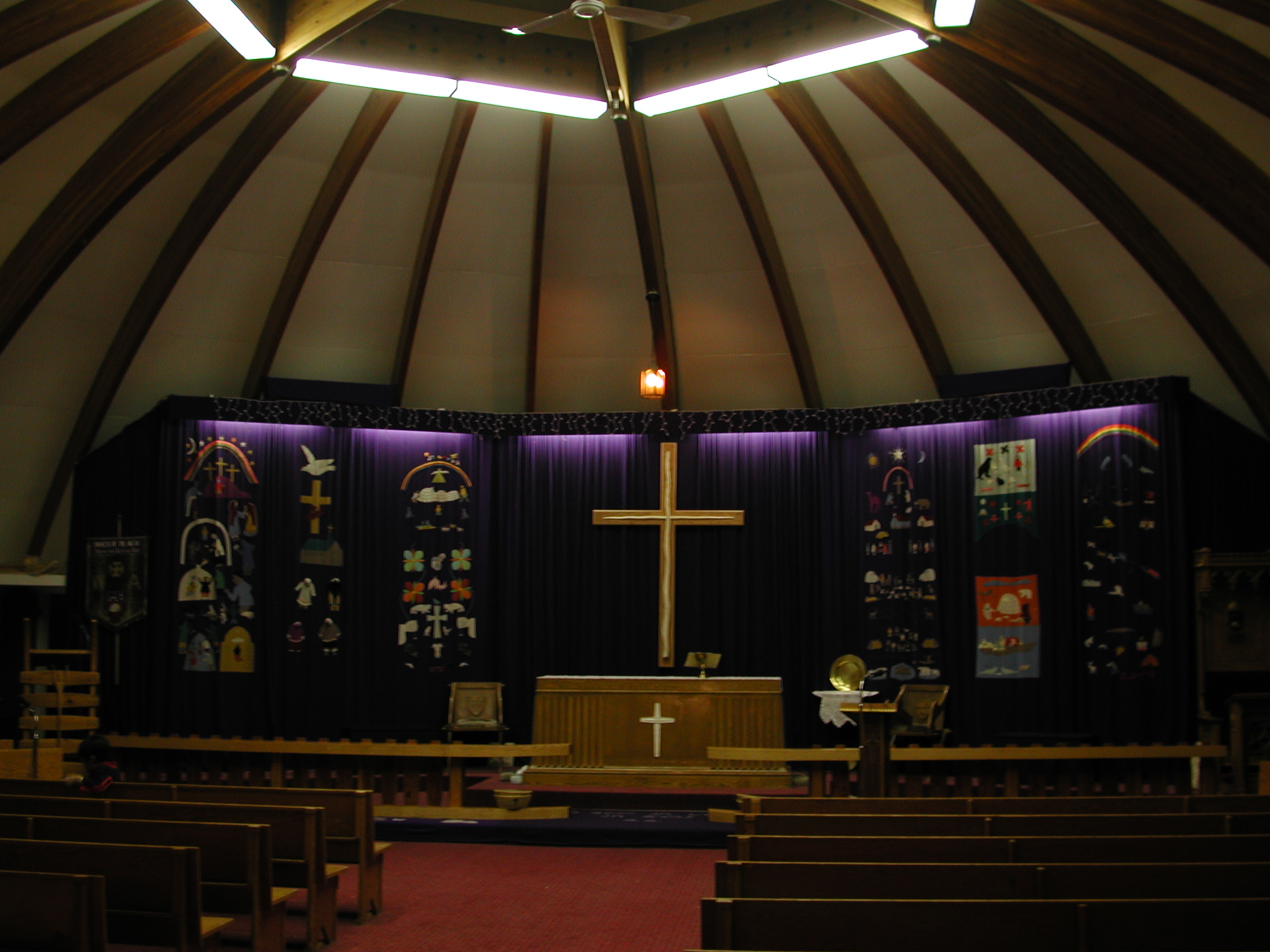
The narwhal tusk cross above the altar at St. Jude's Cathedral in 2001

As bishop, Williams hosted Queen Elizabeth II at St. Jude's Cathedral in Iqaluit in 1994 and again during her 2002 Golden Jubilee tour of Canada. When Williams showed the queen the cathedral's cross made with narwhal tusks, she reportedly responded that there was a longer tusk in better condition at Buckingham Palace. Williams met the queen again in England during the 1998 Lambeth Conference.

Williams presided over the diocese during a time of economic and social transition in the region as Inuit families moved to permanent settlements and no longer lived off the land; he was the last bishop of the Arctic to travel by dog team. He also oversaw the development of indigenous Inuit leadership for the diocese, including the ordination of 16 Inuit priests during his tenure, as well as the consecration of Paul Idlout as the first Inuk Anglican bishop in 1996. In 2002, Williams retired. His successor as bishop of the Arctic was Andrew Atagotaaluk, who became the first Inuk diocesan bishop in the Anglican Communion.

== Later life and death ==
In retirement, Williams lived in Yellowknife, where he remained active with the Holy Trinity Church. He took part in theatre at the Northern Arts and Cultural Centre and volunteered with Edmonton-based nonprofit On Eagle's Wings and volunteered with the Caring for the Wounded Heart trauma healing programme. He also became a curler and resumed swimming competitively; he earned multiple gold medals competing for the Northwest Territories in the Canada 55+ Games between 2010 and 2018. He was awarded the Queen Elizabeth II Diamond Jubilee Medal in 2012.

Williams died in Yellowknife on 16 May 2026, six days shy of turning 90.
