= Akeeagok =

Akeeagok is a surname. Notable people with the surname include:

- David Akeeagok (fl. 2017), Canadian Inuk politician
- P.J. Akeeagok (born 1984), Canadian Inuk politician
