= Allooloo =

Allooloo is an Inuit surname. Notable people with the surname include:

- Jonas Allooloo (1946–2026), Canadian Anglican priest and Bible translator
- Siku Allooloo (born 1986), Canadian writer and artist
- Titus Allooloo (born 1953), Canadian businessman and politician
