= Joshua Arreak =

Inuit Canadian mayor, priest and Bible translator

The Reverend Joshua Arreak
- Born: 1954 or 1955 (age 70–71); Alexandra Fiord, Northwest Territories, Canada
- Occupations: Politician, priest
- Years active: 1970–1990
- Known for: Translation of the Complete Bible in Inuktitut
- Relatives: Ben Arreak (brother)

Mayor of Pond Inlet
- Incumbent
- Assumed office 2015

Joshua Arreak (born 1954 or 1955) is a Canadian politician and Anglican priest. Since 2015, he has been mayor of the hamlet of Pond Inlet, Nunavut. He is also one of the translators of the first full translation of the Bible into Inuktitut.

== Early life and education ==
An Inuk, Arreak was born at the Royal Canadian Mounted Police station at Alexandra Fiord on Ellesmere Island, where his father was based as a constable. He was raised in Pond Inlet and graduated from Churchill Vocational School and the Diocese of the Arctic's seminary in Pangnirtung.

== Ordained ministry ==
Arreak is an ordained Anglican Church of Canada priest. He was part of a small translation team that produced the first complete Bible to be translated into Inuktitut. He and his brother Ben Arreak, along with Andrew Atagotaaluk and Jonas Allooloo, would gather once or twice a year for a month or two at a time to work together on the translation. Previous partial translations of the Bible had been done by native English speakers, not Inuit. The translation work was finished in 2002, and after editing and review, the Bible was published by the Canadian Bible Society in 2012 and unveiled at St. Jude's Cathedral in Iqaluit.

In 2008, 600 narwhal were culled after being trapped in the sea ice near Pond Inlet. Since the narwhal would otherwise have died, federal officials authorized the cull, and narwhal meat and muktuk were distributed to every Pond Inlet household. As the town's priest, Arreak told CBC News that the distribution resulted in more friendliness and generosity and reduced hunger.

== Political career ==
Arreak has served on the Pond Inlet hamlet council since 2003 and was deputy mayor prior to his election as mayor. In the winter of 2015, as deputy mayor, he managed a crisis that saw Pond Inlet reduced to just one sewage truck to service the community of more than 1,500. Arreak has also served on the board of Qulliq Energy.

In 2021, he stood unsuccessfully in the Tununiq district for the Legislative Assembly of Nunavut, campaigning on infrastructure and elder care facilities. Arreak was elected to his third term as mayor in October 2023. With more than 100 people over 70 in Pond Inlet, he has continued to advocate for construction of an elder home so that seniors in Pond Inlet needing care do not need to be sent to another town.

== Electoral record ==
2021 Nunavut general election: Tununiq
Candidate	Votes	%
Karen Nutarak	259	55.5
David Qajaakuttuk Qamaniq	146	31.3
Joshua Arreak	62	13.3
Total valid ballots		467
Rejected ballots		5
