= Edmund Peck =

Anglican missionary

Edmund James Peck
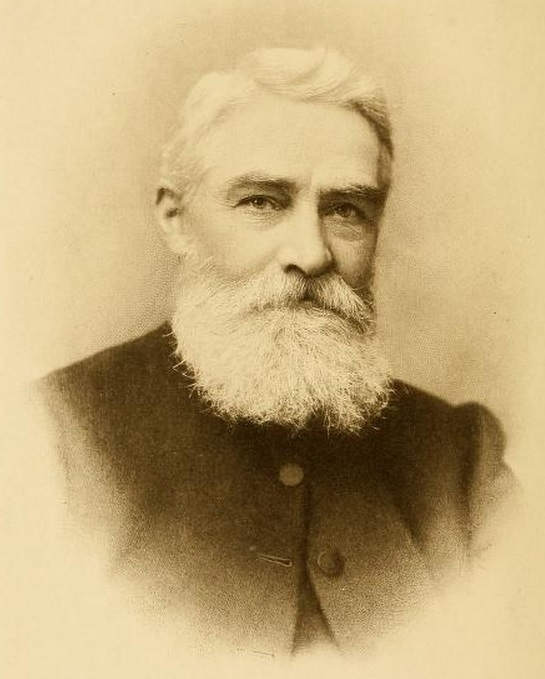
- Born: 15 April 1850; Rusholme, England, United Kingdom
- Died: 10 September 1924 (aged 74)
- Known for: Missionary to the Inuit
- Spouse: Clara Coleman

Edmund James Peck (April 15, 1850 – September 10, 1924), known in Inuktitut as Uqammaq (one who talks well), was an Anglican missionary in the Canadian North on the Quebec coast of Hudson Bay and on Baffin Island. He founded the first permanent mission on Baffin Island, Nunavut. He developed Inuktitut syllabics, derived from the Cree syllabary and the first substantial English-Inuktitut dictionary.

His diaries provide an account of the daily life and work of the early missionaries in Baffin Island. Peck conducted extensive research on Inuit oral traditions and presents several detailed verbatim accounts of shamanic traditions and practices. His work contributes to the understanding of Inuit culture and history. His ethnographic data was collected at the request of famed anthropologist Franz Boas in 1897.

== Early life (1850–1876) ==
Edmund James Peck was born April 15, 1850, in Rusholme, England. His mother and father died before his teen years. At fifteen, he joined the Royal Navy. By the age of 25 he had served on the Ajax, Impregnable, Caledonia, Excellent and the Hector. On the Hector, he organized prayer groups for the crew.

In 1875, he studied Greek and theology at the Reading Institute of the Church Missionary Society in Islington, England. In the Spring of the next year, John Horden, the Bishop of Moose Factory, recruited him for mission work in Hudson Bay.

== Little Whale River (1876–1886) ==
Mouth of the Little Whale River in Quebec

Edmund Peck left England for Canada in June 1876. During the three-month trip he studied the Inuit language of Inuktitut. He used a Moravian Inuktitut New Testament and compared it to the English Bible. In this way he learned the meaning of Inuktitut words. He arrived at Moose Factory, James Bay, September 1, 1876. From there he traveled to the Hudson Bay Company post at the mouth of the Little Whale River in what is now Northern Quebec. He arrived there on October 24, 1876.

=== Syllabics ===
In the 1840s, Methodist missionary James Evans, located at Norway House, Manitoba, created a syllabic writing system for the Ojibwe and Cree. A few years later, in the 1850s, Anglican Bishop John Horden and Missionary E.A. Watkins, adapted Evans' Cree syllabic orthography to Inuktitut. Watkins' introduced the syllabic writing system to Inuit at Fort George and Little Whale River in 1855, and that same year Horden printed a small book of scripture verses in syllables on his press at Moose Factory. In 1865, Harden and Watkins met in conference in England and modified the syllabic system to allow a more precise rendering of both Inuktitut and Moose Cree.

Edmund Peck devoted his attention to the translation of scripture into Inuktitut using Horden and Watkins' orthography. He transcribed extracts of New Testament and published them in 1878. In 1897, he published the four gospels. This was almost identical to an 1878 Labrador translation, the main difference being in the orthography. Peck translated the 1662 Book of Common Prayer in 1881. The New Testament was published in 1912 by the British and Foreign Bible Society. Psalms was published in 1917.

Dialect (translation)	John 3:16
Labradormiutut, (Stolpen, 1878)	Imâk Gûdib sillaksoarmiut nagligivait, Ernetuane tunnilugo, illûnatik okpertut tâpsomunga assiokonnagit, nungusuitomigle inôguteкarкovlugit.
East Arctic/Inuktitut (Peck, 1897)	ᐃᒫᒃ ᒎᑎᐸ ᓯᓛᒃᕈᐋᖕᒥᐆᑦ ᓂᒃᓕᒋᕓᑦ, ᐃᑦᓂᑑᐋᓂ ᑑᓂᓘᒍ, ᐃᓘᓅᑎᒃ ᐅᒃᐱᒃᑑᑦ ᑖᐸᓱᒨᖕᒑ ᐋᓯᐅᑯᓈᒋᑦ, ᓅᖕᒎᓱᐃᑐᒥᒃᓕ ᐃᓄᒎᑎᑳᑦᑯᕙᓘᒋᑦ.

Peck's system was simple and easy for Inuit to learn. By the 1920s, it had spread widely among them. Mothers taught it to their children. The children, in turn, would teach each other. Most of the population could read and write it. They often wrote letters to each other and consequently pencil and pocket-books were in great demand.

The orthography of Horden, Watkins and Peck remained the Inuktitut standard for close to 100 years. In the 1970s, the Inuit Cultural Institute led in a major revision of the system.

== Blacklead Island Mission (1894–1905) ==
Location of Blacklead Island

In 1894 the whaling station on Blacklead Island, in Cumberland Sound, was purchased by Mr. C. Noble and offered to Peck as an Anglican mission. His only communication with the outside world was a ship which, specially chartered, visited him once a year, brought him letters and supplies. With his colleague, Mr. Bilby, he built his own house and cooked his own meals. The settlement consisted of a church, a hospital and two dwelling-houses. The earliest church was made of seal-skin; it had to be replaced by a wooden structure, as it was devoured by the dogs.

=== Peck as ethnographer ===
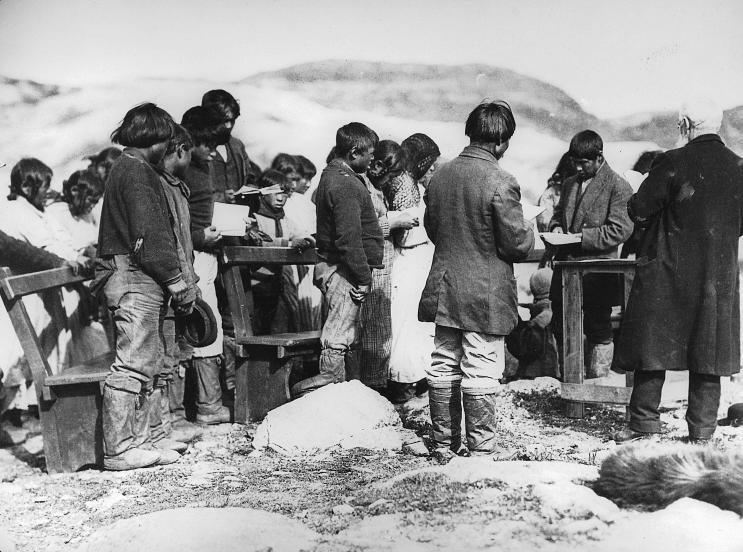
A group of Inuit standing with Peck, far right, at an outdoor religious service, early 1900s

While at Baffin Island's Blacklead Island mission, Peck carefully documented the lives of the Inuit.

Kenn Harper observes, "Missionaries are not usually ethnographers. Most view their task as to eradicate, rather than document, the "heathen" beliefs of pre-Christian times. Peck might very well have fallen into this camp too, had it not been for the invitation of the pioneer anthropologist, Franz Boas, to document for him the belief system of the Inuit, collect legends and write up shamanic rituals." Edmund Peck did this for Boas, but his ethnographic notes of Inuit life have sat largely untouched and unrecognized for over a century in the General Synod Archives of the Anglican Church of Canada. They were finally published in 2006.

== Ottawa (1905–1924) ==
In 1905, Peck and his family moved to Ottawa where he served as Superintendent of Arctic Missions. He traveled North occasionally on supply vessels in the summer.

== See also ==
- Bible translations into Eskimo-Aleut languages
- Bible translations into Inupiat
