= Gauss (ship) =

German polar exploration vessel

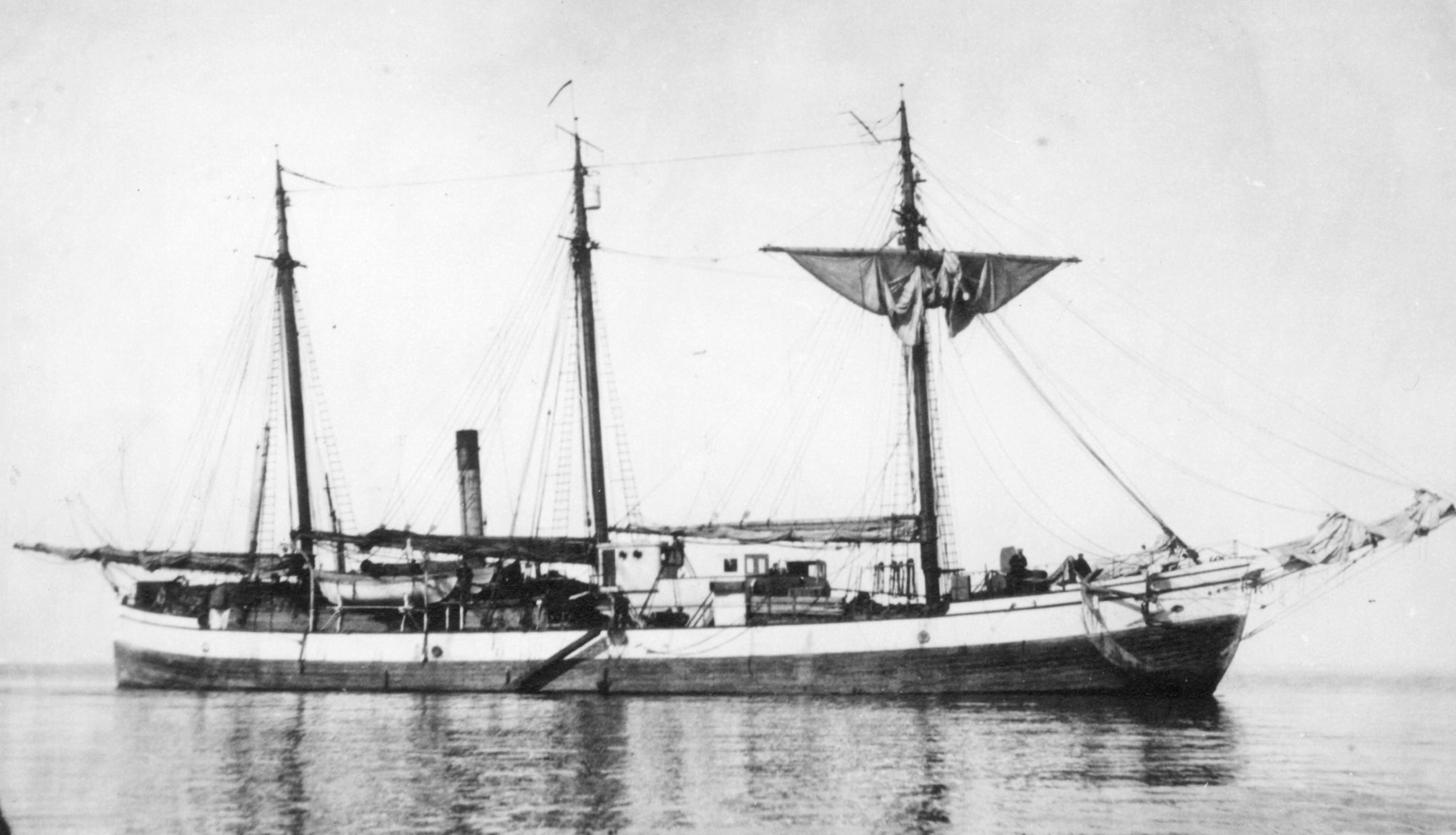
- CGS Arctic at anchor at Pond Inlet in 1923

History

Germany
- Name: Gauss
- Namesake: Carl Friedrich Gauss
- Builder: Howaldtswerke-Deutsche Werft, Kiel
- Cost: 500,000 marks
- Launched: 2 April 1901
- In service: 1901
- Out of service: 1903
- Fate: Sold to Canada, 1904

Canada
- Name: Arctic
- Acquired: by purchase, 1904
- In service: 1904
- Out of service: 1925
- Fate: Abandoned, 1925

General characteristics
- Type: Polar exploration vessel
- Tonnage: 762 GRT
- Displacement: 1,442 long tons (1,465 t)
- Length: 46 m (150 ft 11 in)
- Beam: 11 m (36 ft 1 in)
- Draught: 4.8 m (15 ft 9 in)
- Ice class: A1
- Propulsion: 1 × 325 hp (242 kW) auxiliary triple expansion steam engine, single screw
- Sail plan: Barquentine-rigged; Area: 1,000 m^{2} (11,000 sq ft)
- Speed: 7 knots (13 km/h; 8.1 mph)
- Capacity: 700 tons of stores
- Crew: 30

Gauss was a ship built in Germany for polar exploration, named after the mathematician and physical scientist Carl Friedrich Gauss. Purchased by Canada in 1904, the vessel was renamed CGS Arctic. As Arctic, the vessel made annual trips to the Canadian Arctic until 1925. The ship's fate is disputed among the sources, but all claim that by the mid-1920s, the vessel was out of service.

== Ship construction ==
The ship was built by the Howaldtswerke-Deutsche Werft shipyard at Kiel at a cost of 500,000 marks. Launched on 2 April 1901 she was modelled on Fridtjof Nansen's ship Fram, and rigged as a barquentine. Displacing 1,442 long tons (1,465 t), Gauss had a tonnage of 762 gross register tons (GRT). The ship was 46 m (150 ft 11 in) long, 11 m (36 ft 1 in) in the beam, with a draught of 4.8 m (15 ft 9 in). (Note: The Miramar Ship Index and Maginley and Collin have the ship's length between perpendiculars as 50.4 m (165.4 ft) and its beam as 11.3 m (37.1 ft).) With a 325 hp (242 kW) triple expansion steam engine driving one screw to augment the sails, she was capable of 7 knots (13 km/h; 8.1 mph). (Note: Maginley and Collin have the vessel's engine rated at 44 hp (33 kW) (nominal).)

Classed "A1" by Germanischer Lloyds, she was designed to carry 700 tons of stores, enough to make her self-sufficient for up to three years with a crew of 30 aboard. The hull was robust, and the rudder and propeller were designed to be hoisted aboard for inspection or repairs.

== Ship history ==
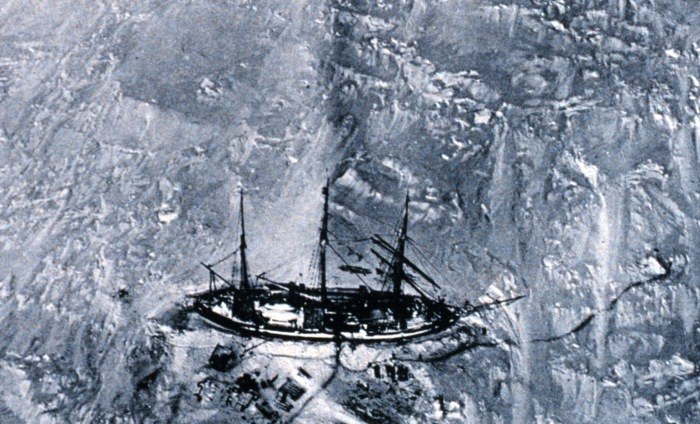
Aerial view of Gauss in the ice during the German Antarctic Expedition taken using a tethered balloon

Between 1901 and 1903 Gauss explored the Antarctic in the Gauss expedition under the leadership of Erich von Drygalski.

In early 1904, the Canadian government purchased the ship under the advice of Joseph-Elzéar Bernier, who surveyed the ship before the acquisition. The ship was renamed Arctic and under the command of Bernier she explored the Arctic Archipelago. Bernier and Arctic made annual expeditions to Canada's north. On 1 July 1909, Bernier, without government approval, claimed the entire area between Canada's eastern and western borders all the way to the North Pole. Bernier only left the ship during the First World War, returning to command Arctic again from 1922 to 1925. The vessel's end is not agreed upon. According to schiffe-und-mehr.com, Arctic was abandoned in 1925 and left to rot at her moorings. Maginley and Collin claim the vessel was broken up in 1926 while the Miramar Ship Index say the ship was abandoned in 1927.

== See also ==
- List of Antarctic exploration ships from the Heroic Age, 1897–1922
