= Joseph-Elzéar Bernier =

Canadian explorer (1852–1934)

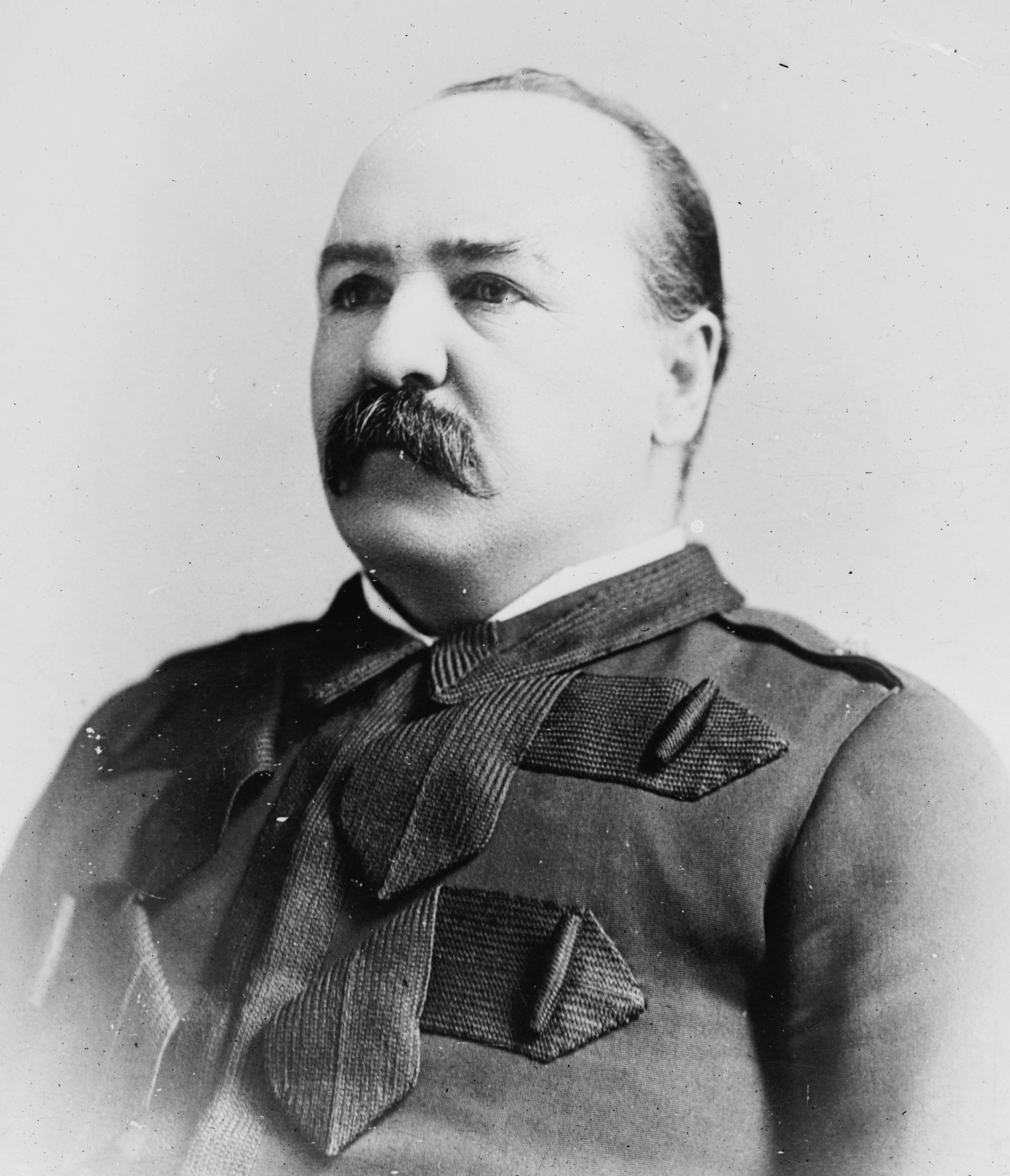
Joseph-Elzéar Bernier

Joseph-Elzéar Bernier (French pronunciation: [ʒozɛf ɛlzeaʁ bɛʁnje]; January 1, 1852 – December 26, 1934) was a Canadian ship captain, ship builder, explorer from Côte-du-Sud, Quebec on the St. Lawrence River who is best known for exploring the Arctic on behalf of Canada.

From 1904 to 1911, he led expeditions to the Arctic Archipelago on annual voyages in the CGS Arctic and officially claimed the islands for Canada. On 1 July, Captain Bernier placed a plaque on Melville Island, proclaiming Canada's sovereignty over the islands of the Arctic.

== Personal life ==
He was born in L'Islet, Canada East, the son of Captain Thomas Bernier and Célinas Paradis.

Joseph Idlout's daughter, Leah Idlout, said that her father was the son of Bernier. It is thought that Idlout may have been the only son of Bernier. Through Joseph, Bernier is the grandfather of Paul Idlout, the first Inuk to be made an Anglican bishop and the third indigenous Anglican bishop in Canada.

Bernier died of a heart attack in Lévis at the age of 82 in 1934.

== Career as a mariner ==
At the age of 14, he became a cabin boy on his father's ship. Three years later, he became captain of his own ship and commanded sailing ships for the next 25 years. Bernier was named governor for the jail at Quebec City in 1895.

=== Bernier's subarctic expedition (1904-1905) ===
In 1904, on behalf of the Canadian government Bernier purchased the Gauss, the German ship known for the Gauss expedition, renaming it the CCG Arctic. In his first subarctic expedition on the CCG Arctic, Bernier and his crew departed on 17 September 1904 and overwintered in Cape Fullerton in what is now known as Nunavut. They arrived in Quebec City on 7 October 1905.

=== Arctic expeditions (1906-1911) ===
Bernier left Quebec City aboard the Arctic on 28 July 1906, on his first expedition above the Arctic Circle. He was in direct command of the ship under the orders of the federal government. Among other duties assigned to him by the federal government, he was instructed as part of Prime Minister Wilfrid Laurier's Arctic Policy, to take possession of all lands that he came upon including territories that had already been claimed, including Baffin Island (Nunavut) and Melville Island.

On 1 July 1909 during his second Arctic expedition (1908-1909) Bernier and his crew laid a plaque in Winter Harbour, Melville Island, Northwest Territories, sometimes referred to as the Canadian Arctic Proclamation (1909) plaque, claiming the whole Arctic archipelago, on behalf of the Dominion of Canada, near the spot where Edward Parry Royal Navy officer (1790 – 1855), a Royal Navy officer and his crew had etched their names on what is now known as Parry's Rock Wintering Site National Historic Site of Canada. The 1909 proclamation read, "This Memorial is Erected today to Commemorate, The taking possession for the 'DOMINION OF CANADA,' of the whole 'ARCTIC ARCHIPELAGO,' Lying to the north of America, from long. 60° w. to 141° w. up to latitude 90° n. Winter Hbr. Melville Island, C.G.S. Arctic, July 1st 1909. J. E. Bernier, Commander."

Bernier's third Arctic expedition (1910–11) as captain of the CCG Arctic' on behalf of the Canadian government was a disappointment. Having already claimed the entire Arctic archipelago, his role was limited to patrolling Arctic waters. As well, scandals about his misuse of government finances led to his resignation upon his return to Quebec City in 1911.

Bernier retrieved documents that had been stored in caches by earlier Arctic explorers. He also established Royal Canadian Mounted Police posts in the Canadian Arctic.

During World War I, Bernier commanded a ship which transported mail along the eastern coast and carried goods in convoys across the Atlantic Ocean. He returned to patrolling the arctic after the war's end, continuing until his retirement in 1925, when he was awarded the Royal Geographical Society's Back Award.

== Legacy ==
Bernier's reputation has come to rest chiefly on his 1909 "sector" claim at Winter Harbour and its later role in Canadian arguments for Arctic sovereignty. Long overlooked after his death in 1934, he was gradually rediscovered as historians credited his voyages with helping to entrench Canadian authority in the Arctic through routine acts of occupation, including licensing foreign whalers, collecting customs duties, conducting scientific surveys, and patrolling northern waters, rather than through flag-raisings alone. He has also been remembered, especially in Quebec, as a prominent national figure of the polar exploration era who helped stimulate wider Canadian interest in the North. Official recognition followed: in 1961 he was designated a national historic person, his birthplace at L'Islet became the Musée maritime Bernier (later the Musée maritime du Québec), and in the early twenty-first century he was further commemorated through references in a 2008 prime ministerial speech on Arctic sovereignty, an image in the Canadian passport, a Royal Canadian Geographical Society medal, provincial designation as a person of historical significance, and the erection of a life-size statue on the Lévis waterfront.

The 1909 plaque placed by Bernier, was mentioned by Canadian historian and expert on northern sovereignty, Michael Byers, in his talk and article on threats to Canadian Arctic Sovereignty in 2006. Byers characterized the claim as an articulation of sector theory and noted how diplomats had widely rejected Russia's claims to a wedge of the Arctic extending to the North Pole.

== Publications ==
- Report on the Dominion of Canada government expedition to the Arctic islands and Hudson strait (1910)
- Master Mariner and Explorer: A Narrative of Sixty Years at Sea ... (1939)

Bernier and his northern expeditions are featured on pages 12 and 13 of the 36-page Canadian passport.

== In popular culture ==
Québécois actor Rémy Girard portrays Bernier in "The Big Chill" (January 18, 2016), episode 10 of season 9, of the CBC Television period drama Murdoch Mysteries.

== Archives ==
There is a Joseph-Elzéar Bernier fonds at Library and Archives Canada. Archival reference number is R7896.
