= Joseph Idlout =

Canadian Inuk featured on $2 bank note

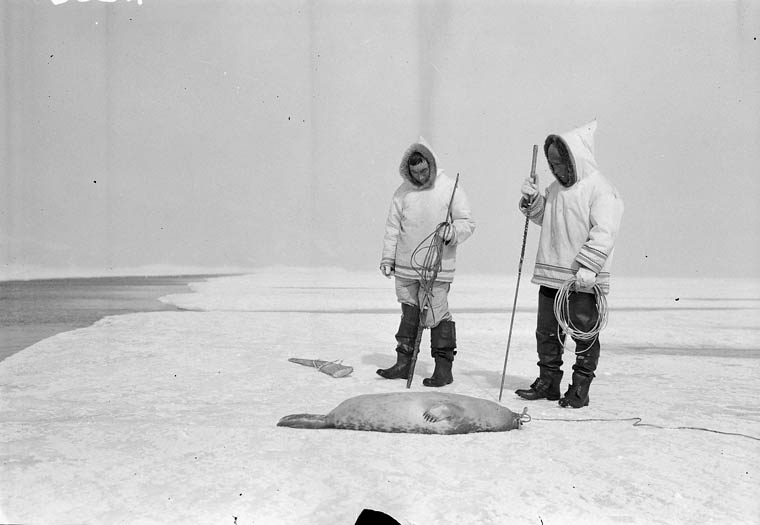
- Idlout (right) after spearing a seal near Pond Inlet
- Born: 1912 or 1913; Pond Inlet, Northwest Territories, Canada
- Died: June 2, 1968 (aged 55–56); Resolute, Northwest Territories, Canada
- Children: 9 (including Paul)

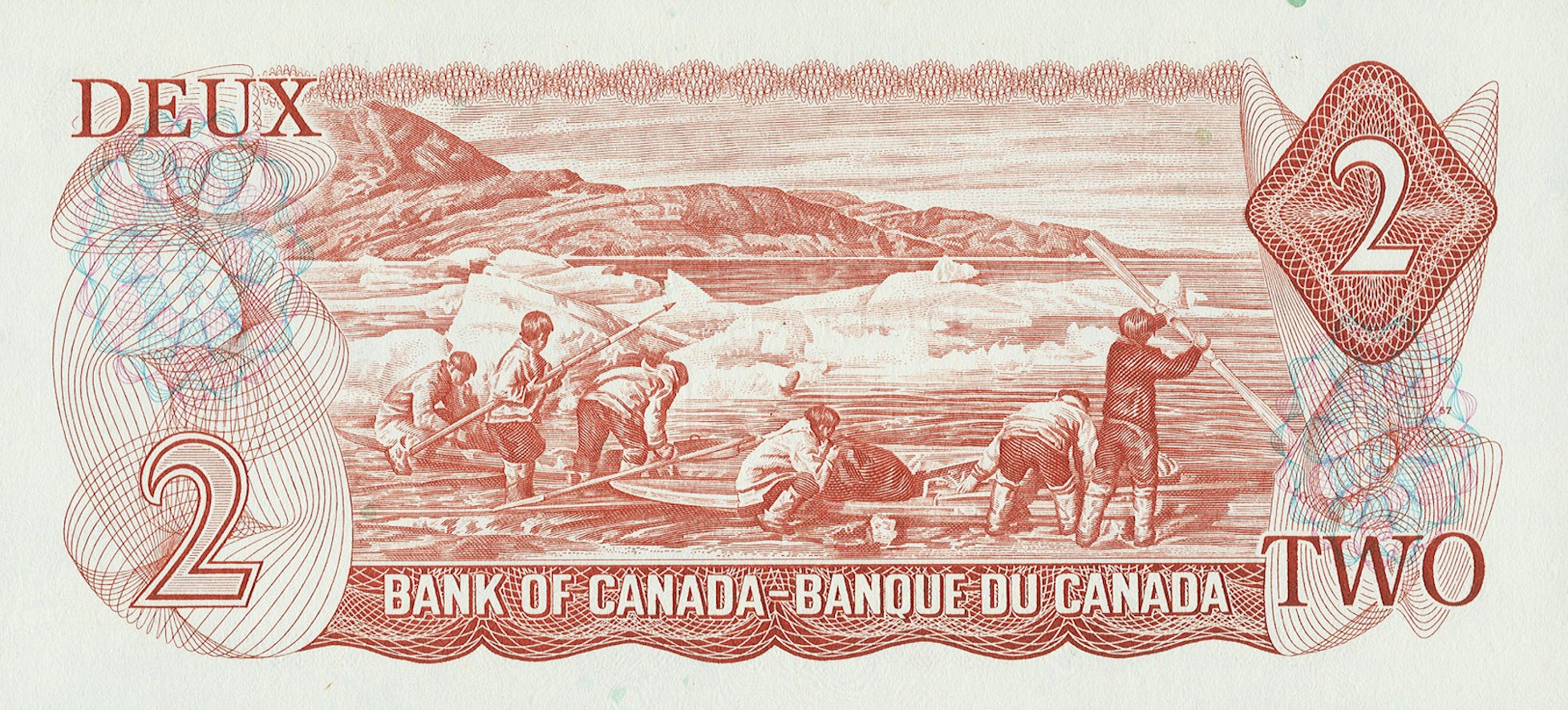
Idlout (second from right) on the reverse of the Canadian $2 note (1975)

Joseph Idlout (1912/1913 - 2 June 1968) was a Canadian featured on the former Canadian two-dollar bill. When the High Arctic relocation occurred in 1959, Idlout helped Inuit families adjust to their new surroundings in Resolute, Northwest Territories (now Nunavut).

In 1954, due to the lack of foxes in the Pond Inlet area, Idlout requested that he move to Resolute. The government was not supportive of the move but finally relented, and Idlout moved in 1955.

== Documentaries ==
Idlout came to public attention after the release of the 1952 documentary Land of the Long Day. At the time Idlout was living in Pond Inlet and was known for his ability as a hunter and leader at the camps. The publicity of the film has led to him being called the "most famous Inuit [sic]" of his time.

He was posthumously the subject of the 1990 documentary film Between Two Worlds, directed by Barry Greenwald and produced by the National Film Board of Canada (NFB) and Investigative Productions Inc. In the one-hour documentary, Idlout's son, Peter Paniloo takes viewers on a journey through his father's life. The film is included in the NFB's Inuit film collection, Unikkausivut: Sharing Our Stories. Between Two Worlds is a continuation of Idlout's life after the making of Land of the Long Day until his death in 1968, when he drove a snowmobile over a cliff after drinking at the Royal Canadian Air Force base.

== Family ==
He was the father of Paul Idlout, the first Inuk Anglican bishop, and the grandfather of rock singer Lucie Idlout and Nunavut MP Lori Idlout. Idlout's daughter Leah Idlout has said that her father was the son of Joseph-Elzéar Bernier. It is thought that Idlout may have been the only son of Bernier.
