= P.J. Akeeagok =

Canadian politician

The Honourable P.J. Akeeagok
- ᐱᔭᐃ ᐊᕿᐊᕈᖅ
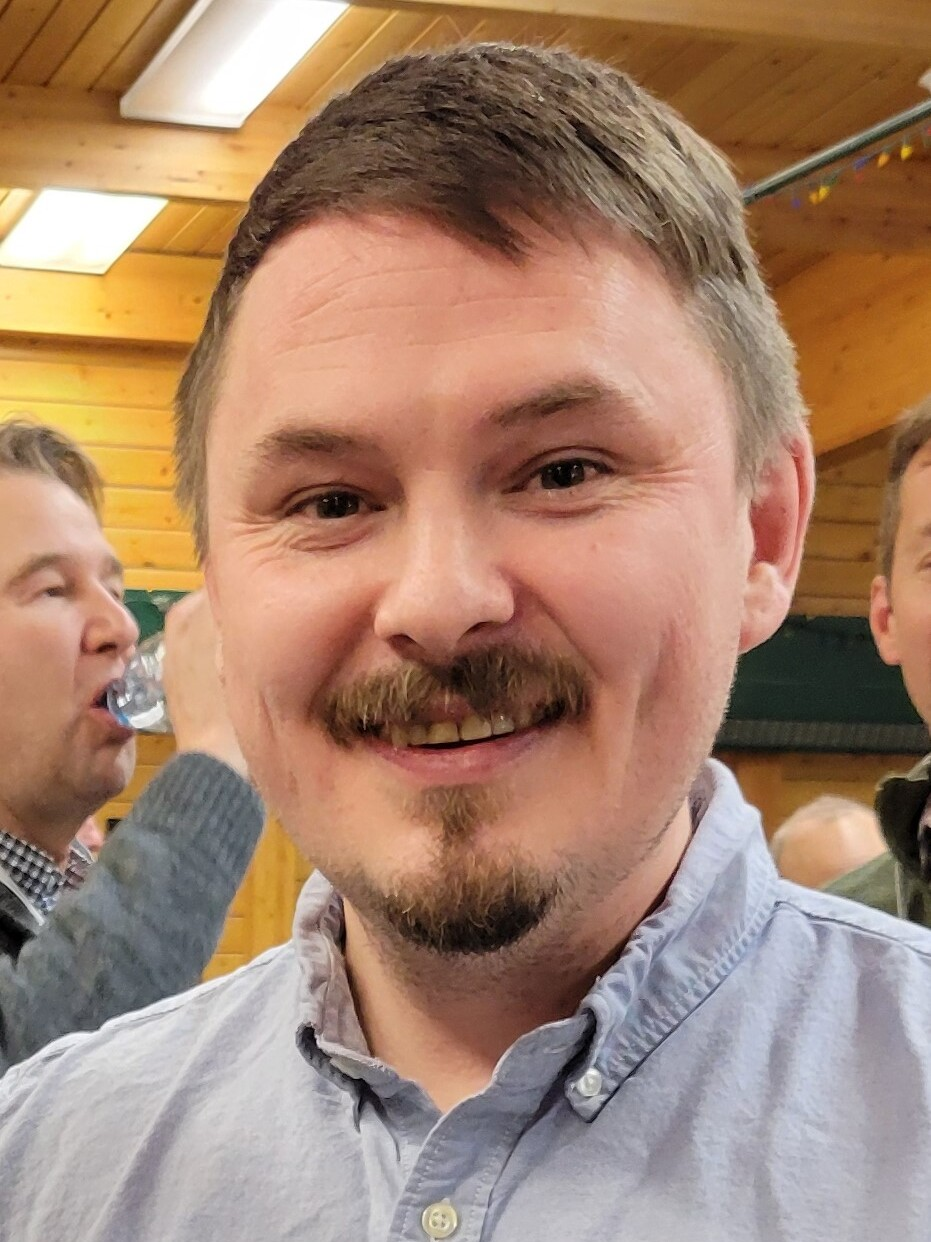
- Akeeagok in 2024

6th Premier of Nunavut
- In office November 19, 2021 – November 20, 2025
- Commissioner: Eva Aariak
- Deputy: Pamela Gross
- Preceded by: Joe Savikataaq
- Succeeded by: John Main

Member of the Legislative Assembly of Nunavut for Iqaluit-Niaqunnguu
- In office October 25, 2021 – September 22, 2025
- Preceded by: Pat Angnakak
- Succeeded by: David Akeeagok

Personal details
- Born: Pauloosie Jamesie Ageeagok; November 5, 1984 (age 41) Grise Fiord, Northwest Territories (now Nunavut), Canada
- Party: Independent
- Relations: Pat Angnakak (aunt); David Akeeagok (uncle)

Pauloosie Jamesie Akeeagok (Inuktitut: ᐱᔭᐃ ᐊᕿᐊᕈᖅ; born November 5, 1984) is a Canadian Inuk politician who served as the sixth premier of Nunavut from 2021 to 2025. He was elected a member of the Legislative Assembly of Nunavut in the 2021 Nunavut general election. He represented the electoral district of Iqaluit-Niaqunnguu from 2021 to 2025.

Prior to his election to the legislature, he was president of the Qikiqtani Inuit Association, resigning from that position in August 2021 in preparation for the election campaign.

== Background and family life ==
Akeeagok was born on November 5, 1984 and raised in Grise Fiord. His aunt, Pat Angnakak, was his predecessor as MLA for his district, and his uncle, David Akeeagok, was his successor as MLA for his district, and former MLA for Quttiktuq. He is a grandson of Anglican priest Michael Gardener.

== Political career ==
Akeeagok was elected to the Legislative Assembly in the territorial election in 2021. He was selected to become premier in the Nunavut Leadership Forum on November 17, 2021, and defeated incumbent premier Joe Savikataaq.

On January 18, 2024, the federal and territorial governments signed the Nunavut Lands and Resources Devolution Agreement; it gives the government of Nunavut control over the territory's land and resources. It is the largest land transfer in Canada's history. In November 2024, MLA Solomon Malliki brought a motion of no confidence against Akeeagok as premier, alleging that he was uncommunicative with MLAs and had fostered a "toxic environment" in the legislature. He survived the non-confidence vote 10 to 8, receiving support from all of the cabinet and three regular MLAs. In 2025, he signed agreements with other provinces and territories to reduce interprovincial trade barriers in the midst of the United States trade war with Canada.

On July 8, 2025, Akeeagok announced that he would not be running for re-election.
