= Blacklead Island =

Island in Nunavut, Canada

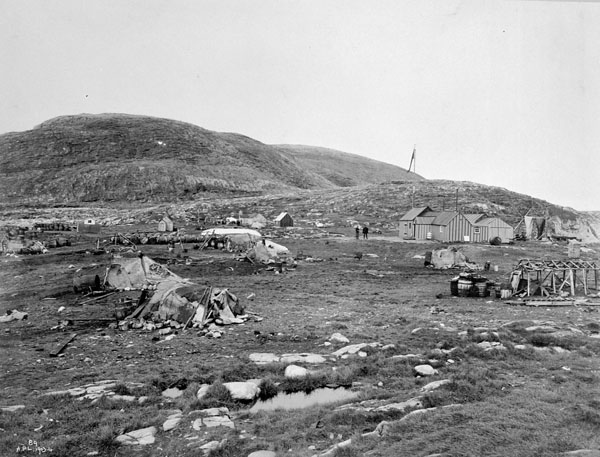
- Whaling station on Blacklead Island, 1903

- Location within Nunavut Location within Canada

Geography
- Location: Cumberland Sound
- Coordinates: 64°59′N 66°12′W
- Archipelago: Arctic Archipelago
- Area: 2 km^{2} (0.77 sq mi)
- Coastline: 7 km (4.3 mi)

Administration
- Canada
- Territory: Nunavut
- Region: Qikiqtaaluk

Demographics
- Population: Uninhabited

National Historic Site of Canada
- Official name: Blacklead Island Whaling Station National Historic Site of Canada
- Designated: 1985

Blacklead Island is an islet located just offshore of Baffin Island in the Arctic Archipelago in Nunavut's Qikiqtaaluk Region, Canada. It lies in Cumberland Sound, northwest of Kikiktaluk Island, approximately 5 km (3.1 mi) from Harrison Point and 10 km (6.2 mi) from Niante Harbour.

== History ==
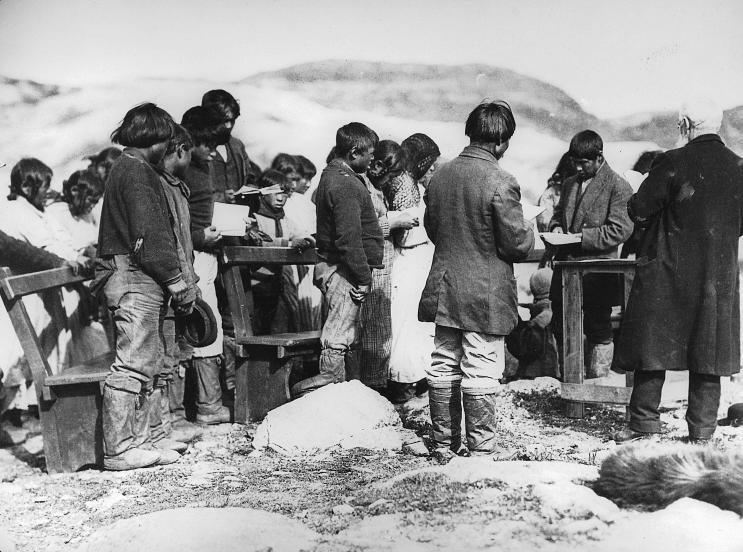
Inuit standing at outdoor religious service, c. 1919

The island had been used by the Inuit for whaling. Later used by Europeans, it was known as the Blacklead Island Whaling Station, and was designated a National Historic Site of Canada in 1985. In 1894 the whaling station was purchased by Mr. C. Noble and offered to Edmund Peck as an Anglican mission.
