= Gwen Healey Akearok =

Canadian politician

The Honourable Gwen Healey Akearok MLA

Member of the Legislative Assembly of Nunavut for Iqaluit-Manirajak
- Incumbent
- Assumed office October 27, 2025
- Preceded by: Adam Lightstone

Member of the Executive Council of Nunavut
- Incumbent
- Assumed office November 20, 2025

Personal details
- Party: Non-partisan consensus government

Gwen Healey Akearok is a Canadian politician, who was elected to the Legislative Assembly of Nunavut in the 2025 Nunavut general election. She represents the electoral district of Iqaluit-Manirajak.

Akearok is a medical researcher and co-founder of the Qaujigiartiit Health Research Centre.
