= Bible translations into Eskimo–Aleut languages =

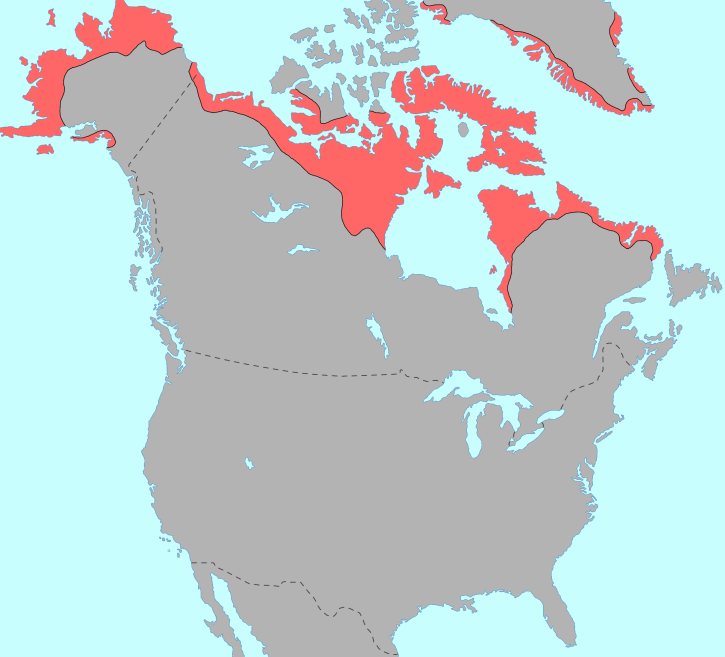
Eskimo–Aleut languages spoken in United States, Canada and Greenland

Bible translations into Eskimo–Aleut languages include:

== Aleut ==
Matthew in Aleut language was translated by Russian Orthodox St. Innocent Veniaminov & St. Jacob Netsvetov. This was published first in 1840, and later 1896. Mark, Luke, and John were translated into Atkan Aleut in 1861 by Fr. Laurence Salamatov. They were not published. Fr. Innocent Shayashnikov translated Matthew, Mark, Luke, John, and Acts into Eastern Aleut in 1872. They were published between 1902 and 1903. More recently, the first few verses of Genesis 11 (recounting the tower of Babel) have been translated into modern Aleut for Omniglot.

Translation	John 3:16
Eastern-Aleut, 1902	Ма́ликъ Аг̑уг̑уҟъ у̑анъ слуҟъ итух̑таса́даликъ, ма́ликъ Льля́нъ ата́ҟанъ-а́ликъ-аг̑ана́ а́г̑наҟъ, А̊манъ маҥиюх̑та́намъ тамада́га, и̑килага́х̑та, та́г̑а анг̑а́г̑имъ инадука́юлюкъ мата́х̑та ҟули́нъ.
Atkan Aleut, 1861	Агу́г̂ух̂ъ слю́м-иму́ну́ ҟаг̂ах̂та́чхузакумъ ма́лихъ, Льля́нъ ата́ҟанъа́лихъ аг̂ана́ а́г̂нах̂ъ, тама́дагъ А̊ма́нъ и́лъ маҥиюна́ маг̂аҟадалага́х̂та, та́г̂а анг̂а́г̂имъ иначаг̂и́улахъ маг̂и́х̂та.

== Sugpiaq/Alutiiq ==
The translation of Gospel of Matthew into Alutiiq by Ilya Tyzhnov (Elias Tishnoff) of the Russian Orthodox Alaska mission, was published in St. Petersburg, in 1848. More recently John 14 was translated into Sugpiaq, an audio recording of which was published online by Global Recordings Network.

- Digitally Typeset Edition (pdf)

== Yupik ==
=== Central Siberian Yupik language ===
The New Testament in the Central Siberian Yupik language has been translated and is almost ready for publication. It is largely the work of David and Mitzi Shinen. When ready it will be published both in both Latin and Cyrillic scripts, so that it is accessible to Yupik living on St. Lawrence Island, as well as in Siberia. There translation of Mark was published previously in 1974, and Philippi in 1989. In 2006 a test edition of fifteen New Testament books (Matthew to Jude) was published.

Translation	John 3:16
Probably 2006 edition	Kiyaghneghem piniqem angtalanganeng nuna, ellngan tuunaa tananginahhaq Ighneni. Kina alngunak ugpeqikuni, iflayaghqaanghituq. Allgeghsaghqaa kenlengilnguq unguvalleq.

=== Central Alaskan Yup'ik language ===
Three Russian Orthodox liturgical readings, St. Mark 1:9-11, St. Matthew 4:23-5:13, St. Mark 16:1-8, were translated into Central Alaskan Yup'ik language by John Orlov, of the Russian Orthodox Church in 1887. Moravian Missionary John Hinz translated Mark into a Yupik language, this being published in Germany in 1915. The four gospels and selections from the Psalms and New Testament was published as Kanegriarat Ashilret by the American Bible Society in 1929. The New Testament was then translated into a Yupik language by John Hinz and people from the Alaska Moravian Church. This was published by the American Bible Society in 1956. A particularly interesting change was a switch from using the standard Yupik Yesus(Modern Spelling: Yiissus) (used in previous editions and in Jacobson's dictionary) to the anglicized Jesus. Yupik orthography and spelling was not yet standardized.

The complete Old Testament has since then been translated. It was published together with an updated edition of the New Testament by in 2015 the American Bible Society as "Tanqilriit Igat".

Translation	John (Johnam) 3:16
(American Bible Society, 1929); Kanegriarat Ashilret	Toiten Agaiyutim tlamiut kinikkapigtsamike kingan kitunrane tsikiutika, kina imna itlenun ukfalra tamaragkaunregluko, taugam nangyuilingogmuk unguwankiskluko.
(American Bible Society, 1956)	Toiten Agaiutim tlamiut kinikkapigtshamíke kēngan Kitunrane tsikiutika, kina imna itlēnun ukfalra tamaskifkinako taugam nangiyuílingoramik unguvankriskluko.
(American Bible Society, 2015); Tanqilriit Igat	Tuaten Agayutem ellamiut kenkeqapigcamiki kiingan Qetunrani cikiutekaa, kina imna elliinun ukvelria tamaasqevkenaku tau͡gaam nangyuilngurmek unguvangqerresqelluku.

==== External links ====
- Online Yup'ik Bible
