= Andrew Atagotaaluk =

Canadian Anglican bishop (born 1950)

The Right Reverend Andrew Atagotaaluk CM
- Bishop of the Arctic
- Church: Anglican Church of Canada
- Diocese: Arctic
- In office: 2002–2012
- Predecessor: Chris Williams
- Successor: David Parsons

Orders
- Ordination: 1975 (diaconate); 1976 (priesthood)
- Consecration: June 6, 1999

Personal details
- Born: 1950 (age 75–76) Resolute, Northwest Territories, Canada
- Spouse: Mary
- Children: 6
- Education: Arthur Turner Training School

Andrew Philip Atagotaaluk (born 1950) is a Canadian Anglican bishop and Bible translator. The first Inuk diocesan bishop in the Anglican Communion, he was the bishop of the Arctic in the Anglican Church of Canada (ACC) from 2002 to 2012. Atagotaaluk and his successor as bishop, David Parsons, built the Diocese of the Arctic into a growing outpost of evangelicalism within the shrinking and liberalizing Anglican Church of Canada. Atagotaaluk presided over the reconstruction of St. Jude's Cathedral in Iqaluit following a fire and was also one of the translation team members for the first complete Bible in Inuktitut, which was published in full in 2012.

== Early life, education, and ordination ==
Atagotaaluk was born in 1950 in a traditional Inuit sod house in a hunting camp near Resolute Bay. He attended a residential school in Inuvik. Atagotaaluk and his wife, Mary, had six children.

Prior to entering the Arthur Turner Training School (ATTS) in Pangnirtung, established to educate Inuit clergy for the Diocese of the Arctic, Atagotaaluk worked as a diver for the Canadian Department of Renewable Resources and as a boat inspector for Transport Canada. He was part of the second graduating class of ATTS and was ordained to the priesthood at St. Jude's Cathedral in 1976 alongside ATTS classmates and future fellow Bible translators Jonas Allooloo and Ben Arreak. The four priests ordained in the service brought the number of Inuit clergy in the diocese to 12.

As a priest, Atagotaaluk was known for his evangelical ministry. He served churches in Pond Inlet, Inukjuak, Spence Bay, Iqaluit, and Salluit.

== Bible translation ==
While studying at ATTS, Atagotaaluk and Allooloo would often correct errors they found in the earlier translations of the Bible into Inuktitut, which had not been done by native speakers. In the late 1970s, Bishop John Sperry convened several Inuit clergy for a workshop with prominent linguist and Bible translator Eugene Nida. Atagotaaluk was assigned to the project alongside Arreak (the team leader), Allooloo and James Nashak. The New Testament was completed in 1991, and the full Bible―the first to be translated into Inuktitut entirely by native speakers―was published in 2012.

== Episcopacy ==
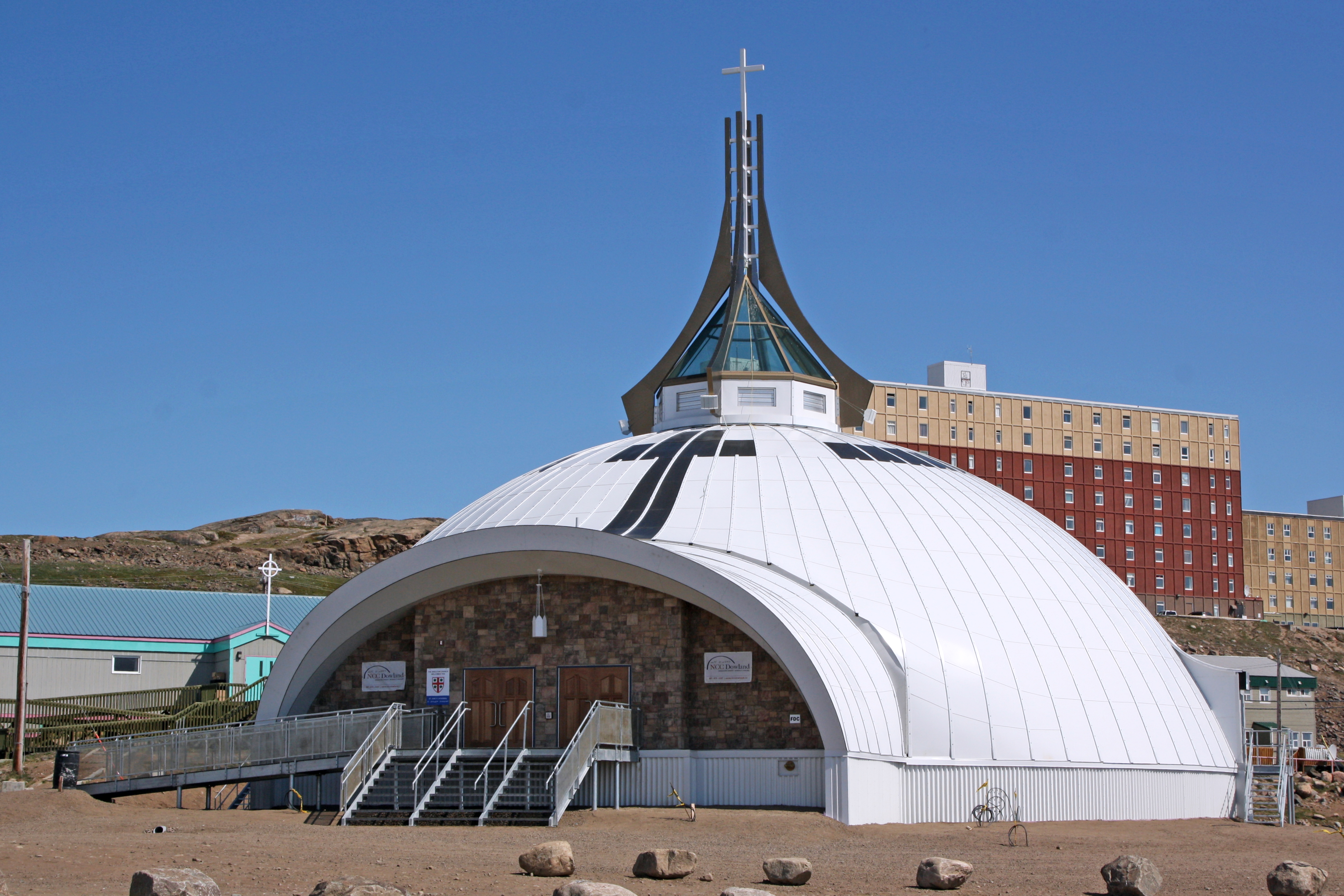
St. Jude's Cathedral in 2012 following its reconstruction

Atagotaaluk was elected and consecrated as a suffragan bishop for the diocese alongside Larry Robertson in June 1999. In 2002, he was elected diocesan bishop—the first Inuk diocesan bishop in the Anglican Church and the second Inuk bishop overall after Paul Idlout. He was also the first Canadian-born bishop of the diocese; the four previous bishops had been British missionaries to Canada. He was installed as bishop in September 2002 in a service that also saw the consecration of Ben Arreak as suffragan bishop. As bishop, he maintained his residence in Salluit while traveling across the diocese.

Amid debates about same-sex blessings in the Anglican Church of Canada, Atagotaaluk emphasized the importance of the Diocese of the Arctic remaining in the ACC while opposing blessings for same-sex unions. In 2003, he wrote to the premier of Nunavut that that "[t]here are many people within our jurisdiction, including myself, who see [same-sex marriage] as another step toward increasing disobedience to God’s holy ordinances. It is encouraging and paving the way for increasing immoral behaviour and it goes against the traditional and doctrinal teachings of our Christian faith and the Word of God." Amid membership declines in the broader ACC, Atagotaaluk's diocese grew during his tenure and became more evangelical in character.

In November 2005, St. Jude's Cathedral was badly burned by arson. Atagotaaluk put funds that had been designated toward a renovation to use for reconstructing the church. In June 2012, Atagotaaluk presided over the dedication of the newly built St. Jude's Cathedral and the celebration of the Inuktitut Bible. His successor, David Parsons, was made a bishop at that time and succeeded Atagotaaluk at the end of 2012. Atagotaaluk's last ordination prior his retirement was of Georgina Bassett, the first Slavey First Nation person ordained to the priesthood.

== Later life ==
In retirement, Atagotaaluk lived in Inukjuak.

In 2026, Governor General Mary Simon inducted Atagotaaluk as a member of the Order of Canada.

== Notes ==
Religious titles
Preceded by John Christopher Richard Williams	Bishop of the Arctic; 2002–2012	Succeeded by David Parsons
