= Adam Lightstone =

Canadian politician

Member of the Legislative Assembly of Nunavut for Iqaluit-Manirajak
- In office October 30, 2017 – October 27, 2025
- Preceded by: Monica Ell-Kanayuk
- Succeeded by: Gwen Healey Akearok

Personal details
- Born: Adam Arreak Lightstone

Adam Arreak Lightstone is a Canadian politician, who was elected to the Legislative Assembly of Nunavut in the 2017 general election. He represented the electoral district of Iqaluit-Manirajak until his defeat in 2025.

Originally from Rankin Inlet, Lightstone spent his youth between Iqaluit and Kingston, Ontario.

Prior to entering politics, he worked in several roles in the Department of Finance of the government of Nunavut, most recently as a senior fiscal advisor with the expenditure management division, where he worked to prepare the government's budgets, monitor forecasts, and provide recommendations on financial matters to the Financial Management Board. After graduating from Inuksuk High School he continued his education and received an advanced accounting diploma from St. Lawrence College and a bachelor's degree in business administration from Laurentian University.

He is the nephew of Eva Aariak, the territory's second premier.

== Electoral record ==
=== 2021 election ===
2021 Nunavut general election
Name	Vote	%
Adam Lightstone	306	65.4
Joanasie Akumalik	162	34.6
Total Valid Ballots	446	100%
Voter Turnout 43.7%	Rejected Ballots 2	

=== 2017 election ===
2017 Nunavut general election
Name	Vote	%
Adam Lightstone	253	
Monica Ell-Kanayuk	227	
Jude Lewis	81	
Okalik Eegeesiak	64	
