= Jonas Allooloo =

Inuk Canadian priest and Bible translator (1946–2026)

The Very Reverend Jonas Allooloo
- Dean of the Arctic
- Allooloo in 1979
- Church: Anglican Church of Canada
- Diocese: Arctic
- Other post: Rector of St. Jude's Cathedral (2012–2019)

Orders
- Ordination: 1974 (diaconate), 1975 (priesthood)

Personal details
- Born: October 25, 1946 Igloolik, Northwest Territories, Canada
- Died: February 23, 2026 (aged 79) Ottawa, Ontario, Canada

Jonas Allooloo (October 25, 1946 – February 23, 2026) was an Inuk Anglican priest and Bible translator. He served in several pastoral roles in the Diocese of the Arctic of the Anglican Church of Canada (ACC), including as dean of St. Jude's Cathedral in Iqaluit from 2012 to 2019. He was also part of a team that translated the Bible into Inuktitut; their translation was the first complete Bible translation in Canada developed by native speakers of an indigenous language, rather than by missionaries.

== Early life, family, and education ==
Born in the hamlet of Igloolik on Baffin Island, Allooloo was raised near Pond Inlet. His father was also a Christian leader. Allooloo attended a residential school in Churchill, Manitoba, where he reported experiencing anti-indigenous racism. He went on to attend the University of Manitoba. While there, Allooloo felt called to ordained ministry. He attended the Arthur Turner Training School from 1972 to 1975, and was ordained as a priest in 1976. His theological studies at ATTS triggered an interest in Bible translation.

== Bible translation ==
As a student at ATTS, Allooloo had used an outdated translation of the Bible made by European missionaries that combined the distinct Eastern Arctic and Nunavik dialects of Inuktitut. Allooloo and a classmate, future bishop Andrew Atagotaaluk, would update the translation while using it for studies or during Morning Prayer liturgies at ATTS. Following Allooloo's graduation, he was invited along with other bilingual clergy to a Bible translation workshop in 1978. The workshop was led by prominent linguist and Bible translator Eugene Nida, and participants used Nida's techniques to translate the book of Ruth into Inuktitut. When the workshop ended, Nida selected Allooloo and Atagotaaluk to join the translation team for the Inuktitut Bible sponsored by the Canadian Bible Society. Fellow Inuk priest Ben Arreak was the project's coordinator, and Arreak's younger brother Joshua joined the team later.

Due to their primary vocations as priests, the translators gathered twice a year for a six-week in-depth session. Each team member would translate one book of the Bible and then receive feedback from others, while Canadian Bible Society Hebrew and Greek scholars would check the translation drafts against the texts' original languages. The team completed the New Testament by 1991 and began work on the Old Testament, which they completed in 2012. Allooloo said that the Old Testament was easier because the oral traditions of the Hebrew scriptures and the nomadic nature of Hebrew life were aligned with Inuit life. The completed Bible was dedicated at the newly rebuilt St. Jude's Cathedral on June 3, 2012. Allooloo later worked on a children's Bible in Inuktitut.

For each translation session, the team met in a different Inuit community to be sensitive to the variety of Inuktitut dialects. The team started with the Gospels. Each member translated one, and then reviewed the translations made by the other members; each member then took this feedback to refine their translation. The team published the Inuktitut New Testament in 1991, after which they slowed down work substantially, meeting for only six weeks annually (two sessions of three weeks).

The team published the complete Inuktitut Bible in 2012. Allooloo remained involved with the project after 2012, working to correct or improve the translation. He continued working on the translation until his death, with differences in Inuk dialect presenting the greatest challenge; one Christian organization reported a ninety percent intelligibility from a first, uninvolved Inuk reader. Allooloo also worked on an Inuktitut children's Bible, and translated internal documents for his church. Jeff Green, a translation official at the Canadian Bible Society, described Allooloo as "a very careful translator . . . skilled at evaluating the different English Bible versions he worked from and was deeply knowledgeable about Inuktitut dialects."

== Ordained ministry ==
In addition to his translation work, Allooloo spent most of his ordained life serving in parish ministry. He was dean and rector of St. Jude's Cathedral in Iqaluit from 2012 to 2019, where he preached in both Inuktitut and English, sometimes during the same service. He served on the Primate's Commission on Discovery, Reconciliation, and Justice for the broader Anglican church.

== Later life and death ==
Within two years of retiring as dean, Allooloo had become effectively homeless in Iqaluit; he and his wife faced a four-to-five-year wait for housing availability and lived with their daughter in staff housing. Allooloo's plight illuminated a challenge for retired Inuit clergy, who generally had access to a rectory while working but had difficulty in securing costly local housing upon retirement. The Allooloos obtained housing after receiving donations from Canadians who were shocked to learn about their situation, and the Anglican Church Women established a fund for retired clergy in the nine member dioceses of the ACC's Council of the North.

Allooloo died on February 23, 2026, at the age of 79.
