= Ben Arreak =

Canadian Inuk Anglican bishop and Bible translator (born 1947)

The Right Reverend Ben Arreak D.D.
- Bishop Suffragan of the Arctic
- Church: Anglican Church of Canada
- Diocese: Arctic
- In office: 2002–2010

Orders
- Ordination: 1975
- Consecration: September 15, 2002

Personal details
- Born: 1947 (age 78–79) Pond Inlet, Northwest Territories, Canada
- Spouse: Susan
- Education: Arthur Turner Training School

Benjamin Tatigat Arreak (born 1947) is a Canadian Inuk Anglican bishop and Bible translator. He was suffragan bishop of the Diocese of the Arctic in the Anglican Church of Canada from 2002 to 2010, where he oversaw congregations and clergy in the Nunavik area of Quebec. He was also the coordinator of an effort over three decades to translate the full Bible into Inuktitut, the first translation completed by native speakers of the language.

== Early life and family ==
Arreak was born in Pond Inlet, Baffin Island. His father was a Royal Canadian Mounted Police constable. Arreak moved frequently as his father was transferred with the RCMP, but he returned to Pond Inlet to marry his wife, Susan—travelling for five days by dogsled from Igloolik for the wedding. The Arreaks had eight children.

Arreak initially worked for the government of the Northwest Territories as a heavy equipment operator, but after experiencing a conversion to Christianity, he decided to pursue theological training at the Diocese of the Arctic's Arthur Turner Training School (ATTS) in Pangnirtung. Arreak completed his grade 10 equivalency test in Pond Inlet before beginning his theological studies. He graduated from ATTS in 1975 and was ordained that year.

== Ordained ministry ==
Arreak was initially sent as a pastor to Salluit. He initially struggled with the different Inuktitut dialect in Nunavik but later described himself as grateful for the experience there. He was a pastor in Pangnirtung and in 1996 he became rector of St. Stephen's Anglican Church in Kuujjuaq. Arreak opposed efforts by Greenpeace in the 1980s to stop Inuit seal hunts, stating that hunting for food was inherent to the Inuit way of life.

In May 1996, he was a candidate for suffragan bishop in the diocese. Paul Idlout was ultimately elected. Arreak was elected suffragan bishop in 2002 to succeed Andrew Atagotaaluk, who had been elected diocesan bishop. Arreak was consecrated on September 15 of that year at St. Jude's Cathedral in Iqaluit.

His focus as suffragan bishop was parishes in the Nunavik region of the diocese, and he was based at Kuujjuaq. In 2005, amid debates in the Anglican Church of Canada about same-sex unions and LGBT clergy, Arreak supported the diocese's decision to require agreement with the "Montreal Declaration"—a theologically conservative statement that "adultery, fornication and homosexual unions are intimacies contrary to God’s design"—for employment with the diocese. He believed that traditional Inuit views of men and women informed the diocese's beliefs. "In order to survive, the man and woman have to help each other, both for family and for hunting," he said.

== Bible translation ==
Arreak began working on the Inuktitut Bible shortly after his ordination. In 1978, he and several other bilingual clergy attended a workshop with prominent Bible translator Eugene Nida. Arreak was one of four—two for the Old Testament and two for the New Testament—asked to work together on the translation. They initially translated by hand, but by the 1990s the team was assisted by software, gathering for three-to-five-week in-person translation retreats twice a year. Arreak was the project's coordinator. The New Testament was completed in 1992, and the Old Testament was finished in 2002. The translation work was finished in 2002, and after editing and review, the Bible was published by the Canadian Bible Society in 2012 and unveiled at St. Jude's Cathedral. In 2008, Arreak received an honorary doctorate from the College of Emmanuel and St. Chad for his work leading the translation project.

== Later life ==
Arreak retired as suffragan bishop in 2010. In retirement, Arreak was a member of the Nunavik Elders Committee.
