= Paul Idlout =

Canadian Inuk Anglican bishop (1935–2025)

The Right Reverend Paul Idlout
- Bishop Suffragan of the Arctic
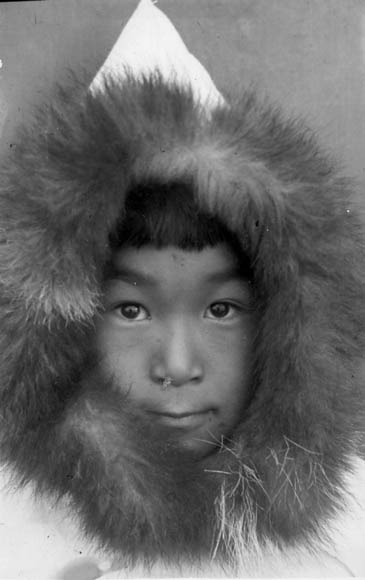
- Idlout in 1945
- Church: Anglican Church of Canada
- Diocese: Arctic
- In office: 1996–2004
- Other post: Dean of St. Jude's Cathedral (2000–2004)

Orders
- Ordination: April 22, 1989
- Consecration: June 2, 1996 by Barry Curtis

Personal details
- Born: April 21, 1935 Pond Inlet, Northwest Territories, Canada
- Died: December 31, 2025 (aged 90) Iqaluit, Nunavut, Canada
- Parents: Joseph Idlout (father)
- Spouse: Abigail Idlout
- Children: 5
- Education: Arthur Turner Training School

Paul Ullatitaq Idlout (April 21, 1935 – December 31, 2025) was a Canadian police constable and Anglican bishop. Born and raised in a traditional Inuit hunting culture, he was a young man when his family was relocated to the high Arctic in the 1950s. Idlout was among the group of hunters who appeared on the Canadian $2 banknote as part of the Scenes of Canada series in the 1970s. After a career as a Royal Canadian Mounted Police constable, Idlout trained for ordained ministry in the 1980s and was ordained a priest. In 1996, he became the first Inuk to be made an Anglican bishop and the third indigenous Anglican bishop in Canada. He retired as suffragan bishop of the Diocese of the Arctic in 2004.

== Early life ==
Idlout was born on April 21, 1935, in the northern Baffin Island settlement of Pond Inlet, the eldest of nine children born to Joseph Idlout and Rebecca Qillaq. Joseph's daughter, Leah Idlout, has said that her father was the son of Joseph-Elzéar Bernier, making Paul his grandson.

Extended family members include Paul's nieces Lori Idlout and Lucie Idlout. He grew up before the transition of Inuit life to fixed settlements, and the Idlouts lived a nomadic life in tents in the summer and igloos during the winter while hunting for seals and caribou. He did not attend school as a boy. Paul had early exposure to Anglicanism; his father was a guide for Anglican missionaries and he grew up singing in the church choir and attending Sunday school.

In 1955, when Idlout was around 20, he, his parents and some siblings were relocated to Resolute on Cornwallis Island as part of the Canadian effort to relocate Inuit from Nunavik in Quebec to higher Arctic settings. (Note: Sources are unclear on whether the Idlouts' relocation was forced. One source indicates that Joseph Idlout voluntarily sought relocation to Resolute following the collapse of the Arctic fox market, and that the Hudson's Bay Company opposed the move because they wanted a contingent of hunters to remain near Pond Inlet. Another source indicates that the Pond Inlet families were forced to relocate.) Joseph assisted with helping the resettled Inuit from Inukjuak adapt to the harsher northern setting. Paul recalled that there were no houses and that the tent they lived in was very cold, and that it was hard to speak with the Inuit from Quebec due to the differences in Inuktitut dialects.

=== Canadian $2 note ===
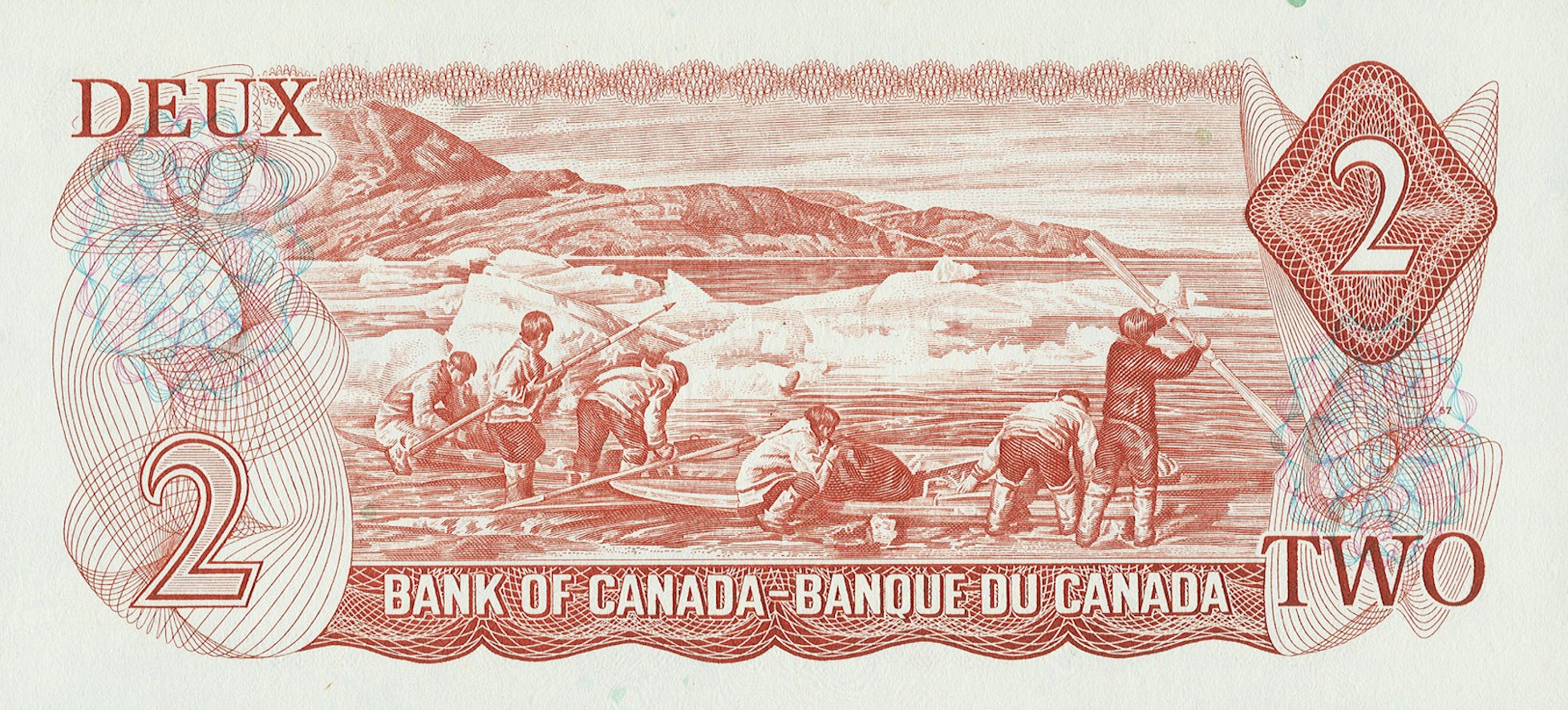
Idlout (centre) on a 1974 Canadian $2 note

While shooting the documentary Land of the Long Day c. 1951, filmmaker Douglas Wilkinson captured an image of Joseph and Paul Idlout along with several other Inuit preparing for a hunt. In 1975, this image was engraved on the Canadian $2 note as part of its Scenes of Canada series. Paul Idlout is the youth pictured squatting in the centre of the engraving.

== Marriage and career ==
During the 1950s, Idlout met his wife, Abigail; they had five children. She taught him English and writing and he took high school correspondence courses.

They eventually returned to Baffin Island. Idlout joined the Royal Canadian Mounted Police in 1963 and worked as a translator and guard. He left the RCMP in 1977 and joined Petro-Canada, where he worked for five years, after which he worked as a kayak builder. He later said that he had found himself drinking to excess in that period of time, and decided to change his life. In 1986, he enrolled in the Diocese of the Arctic's Arthur Turner Training School, then in Pangnirtung.

== Ordained ministry ==
Idlout was ordained on April 22, 1989, and served as a priest at Cape Dorset. In May 1996, he was elected the diocese's suffragan bishop. His consecration service at St. Jude's Cathedral was fully bilingual in English and Inuktitut. He was the first Inuk to be made a bishop and the third indigenous Canadian to become an Anglican bishop, after Charles Arthurson and Gordon Beardy. Diocesan bishop Chris Williams was based at the diocesan office in Yellowknife, while Idlout oversaw congregations in the eastern Arctic from the cathedral in Iqaluit.

Idlout also served as dean of St. Jude's Cathedral during his tenure as bishop. He retired from both roles on April 30, 2004.

== Later life ==
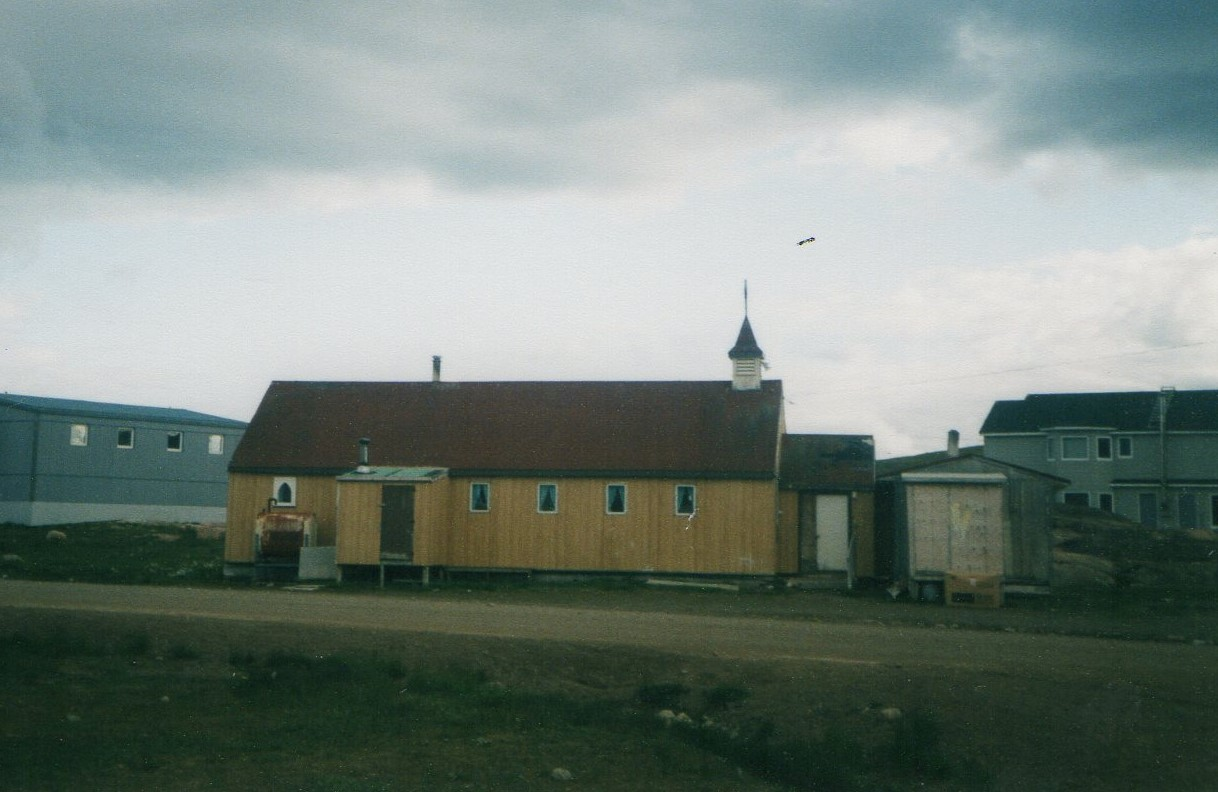
The Anglican church in Apex where Idlout served in retirement

After retiring from his episcopal role, Idlout continued to serve in pastoral ministry in Apex and assisted at St. Jude's Cathedral. He also translated liturgical materials into Inuktitut and taught traditional Inuit skills.

Idlout died December 31, 2025, aged 90, in Iqaluit. Bishops Alexander Pryor and Ann Martha Keenainak conducted his funeral service at St. Jude's Cathedral on January 6, 2026.
