= St. Jude's Cathedral (Iqaluit) =

Anglican cathedral in Iqaluit, Nunavut, Canada

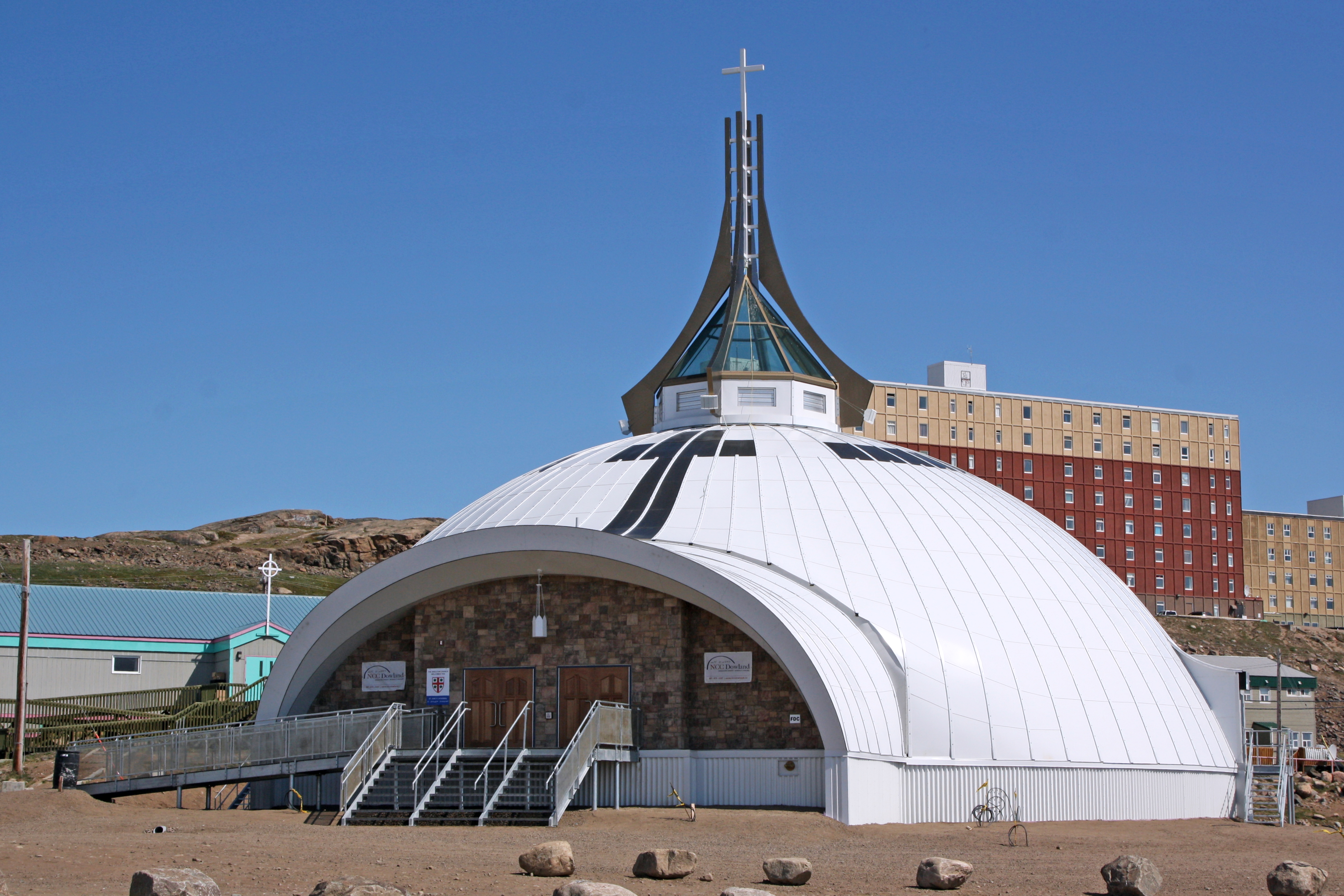
- The new St. Jude's Cathedral, opened June 2012.

Religion
- Affiliation: Anglican Church of Canada
- District: Diocese of The Arctic
- Province: Nunavut
- Year consecrated: 2017

Location
- Location: Iqaluit, Nunavut, Canada
- Interactive map of St. Jude's Cathedral
- Coordinates: 63°44′51″N 068°31′00″W

St. Jude's Cathedral (formally the Cathedral of St. Simon and St. Jude) is the Anglican cathedral in Iqaluit, Nunavut, Canada. The cathedral is the seat of the Diocese of The Arctic, which covers the Northwest Territories, Nunavut, and the Nunavik region of Northern Quebec. It has the greatest area of any Anglican diocese in the world. The cathedral is also the parish church for the parish of Iqaluit and holds services in English and Inuktitut.

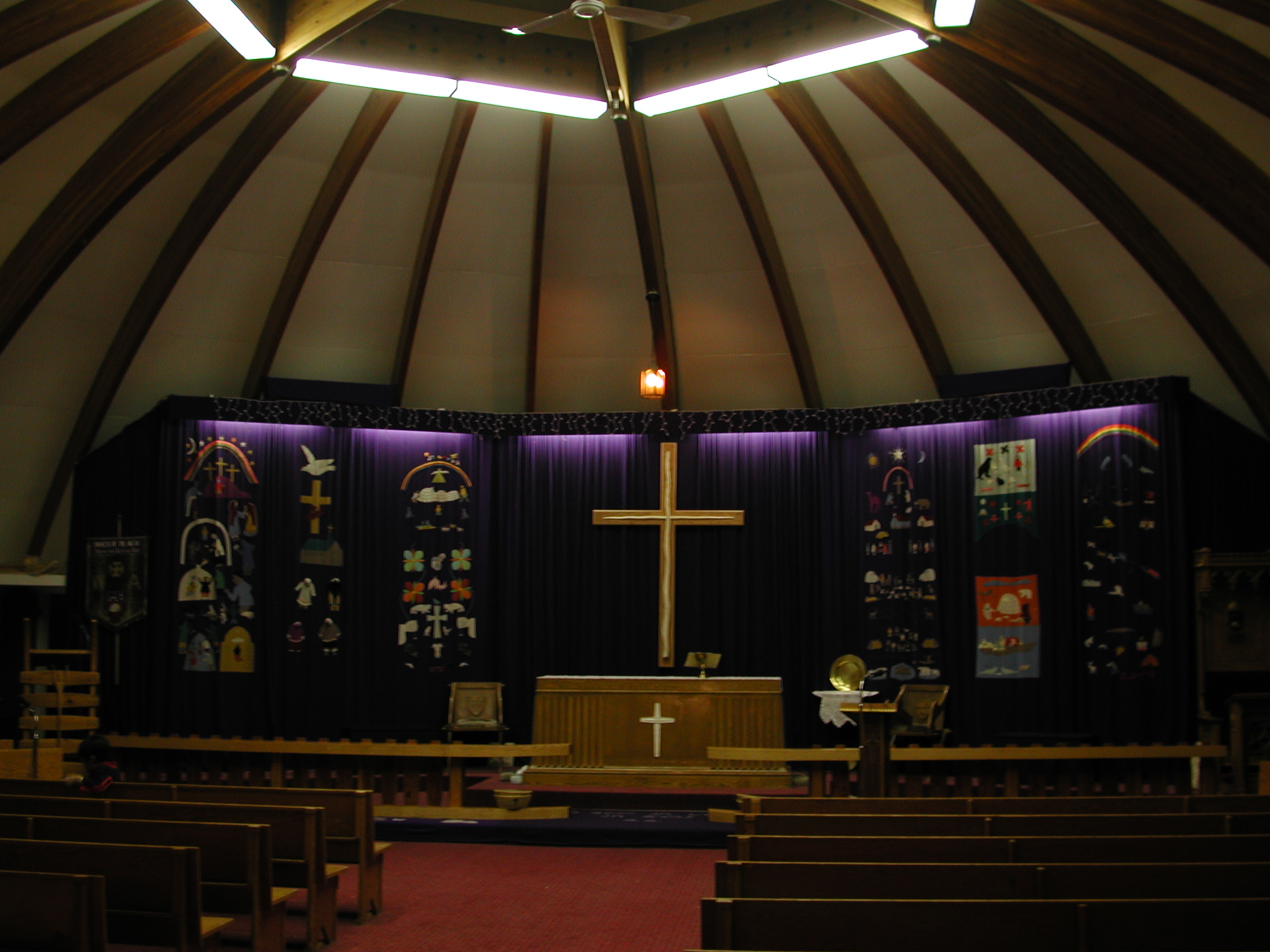
Interior of St. Jude's Cathedral in Iqaluit (Photo taken on: April 2, 2001)

== History ==
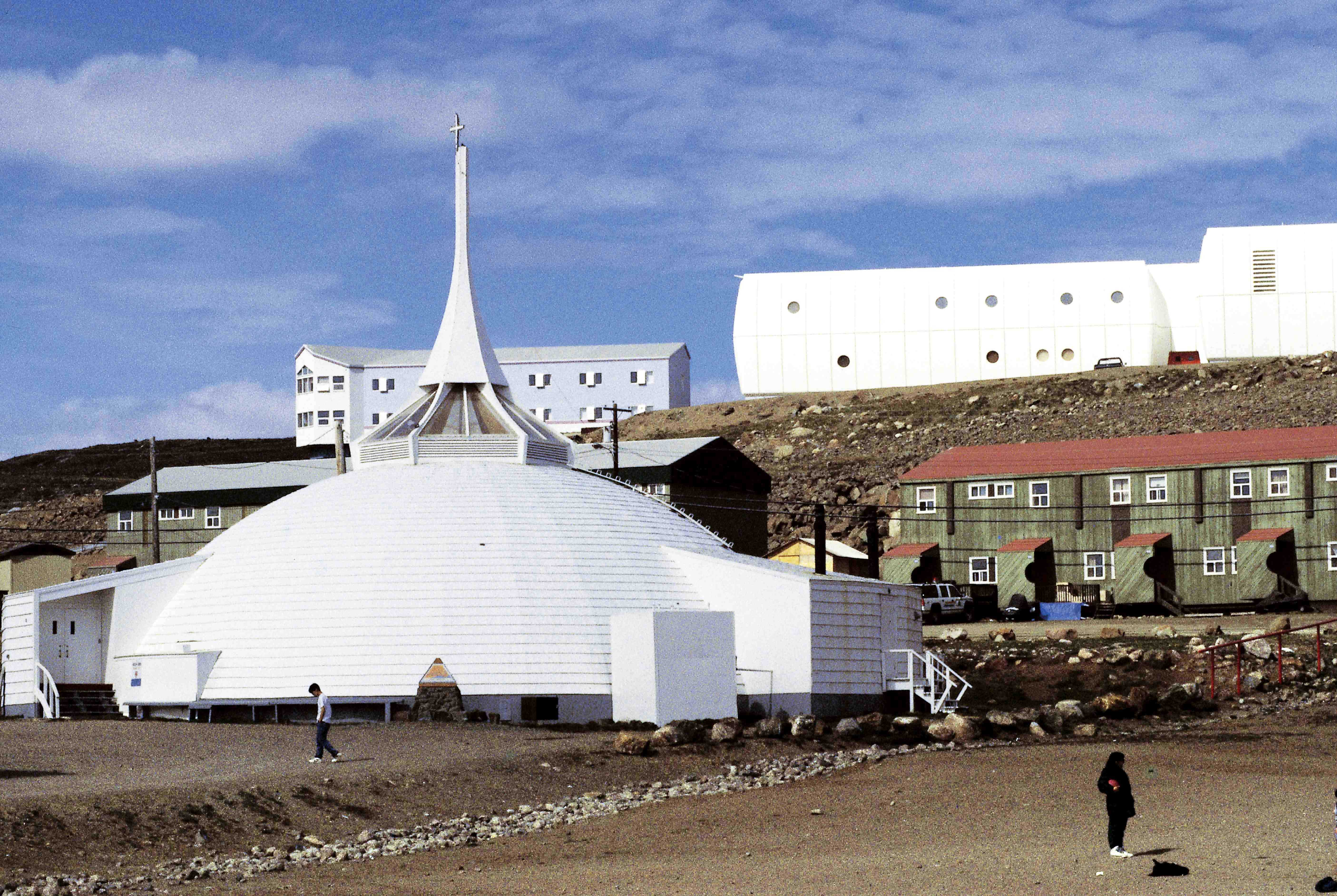
The Old St. Jude's Cathedral in 1995. The structure was demolished in 2006 after an arson fire.

The original St. Jude's Cathedral had been designed by Ronald Thom in 1970 and built in 1972 by local volunteers. It was well known for its decorations, most the product of Inuit craftsmanship; these included wall hangings, woven collection baskets, a cross made of narwhal tusks, and a carved soapstone baptismal font dedicated by Elizabeth II, Queen of Canada, during a visit to Iqaluit.

The first St. Jude's Cathedral was demolished in June 2006 after an arson fire in November 2005 destroyed much of the structure. Fundraising had already started for renovations in 2004 but this was expanded due to the fire. The current building, informally referred to as the Igloo Cathedral, was opened on June 3, 2012. The unique building, in the shape of an igloo, has traditionally been a landmark and tourist attraction in Iqaluit, besides its important spiritual role for Iqalummiut (people of Iqaluit). The building was constructed with fire-resistant beams with elements from the old cathedral being installed such as the altar cross made from narwhal tusks and a silver bowl presented by The Queen at the initial groundbreaking ceremony in 1970. By 2017, the Cathedral finished paying its debts for the reconstruction.

== Deans of the Arctic ==
The rector of St. Jude's Cathedral is also the dean of the Arctic. Deans have included:

- Michael Gardener (1981–1996)
- Roger Briggs (1996–2000)
- Paul Idlout (2000–2004)
- James Barlow (2006–2009)
- Jonas Allooloo (2012–2018)
- Methuselah Kunuk (2019–2021)
- Chris Dow (2021–2024)
