= Malaya Akulukjuk =

Inuk artist

- Born: 1915
- Died: 1995 (aged 79–80)

Malaya Akulukjuk was an Inuk artist who drew works inspired by her life as an angakkuq (shaman) and Inuit spirituality through depictions of human-animal transformations. Akulukjuk was born in 1915 (though some sources state 1912 and 1921), and lived a traditional Inuit life in a camp at Qikiqtat, Northwest Territories, (now Nunavut) before moving to Pangnirtung on Baffin Island in 1962. Her career as an artist started later than most, at the age of 51.

In 1969, the Canadian Federal Department of Indian and Northern Affairs opened the Pangnirtung Weave Shop with the aim of creating a craft industry in the community. With Akulukjuk's guidance, her drawings were translated onto the woven tapestries by fellow members of the Pangnirtung Weave Shop. Many of Akulukjuk's works were inspired by her memories of traditional life which revolve around camping and family gatherings, and the others were rooted from her imagination of mystical creatures.

A large collection of Akulukjuk's drawings went on exhibitions across Canada. Some of Akulukjuk's pieces such as Inuit Ways (1979) and Hunting Polar Bears with Harpoon (1982) are displayed in the National Gallery of Canada and various museums across the country. The Heffel Gallery, one of Canada's fine art auction houses, sells Akulukjuk's works as well as the tapestries of weaver Agah Etooangat based on Akulukjuk's drawings. Akulukjuk's art is crucial to the development of Inuit weaving tapestry by visualizing the old Inuit life and shamanism.

== Early and personal life ==
Malaya Akulukjuk was born in Quikitat Camp (a former whaling station) in 1915 (though some sources state 1912 and 1921).

She married at age 20.

At the age of 20 she entered into an arranged marriage, per Inuit tradition to ensure that all marriageable adults could have partners during their childbearing years. She gave birth to 13 children. She continued to hunt during her pregnancies, and sometimes went hunting while carrying a baby in her hood. In 1960, she moved to the settlement in Pangnirtung on Baffin Island with her husband and children.

Akulukjuk's late husband, Nutaralaq Akulukjuk, was a sculptor. Several of his works had been sold at auctions, including Man Drinking, sold at Waddington's Inuit Art Online Auction in 2017. Many of Akulukjuk's children became future artists in Pangnirtung, including five of her sons, Jeetaloo, Geeshee, Juelee, Enukee and Moar. Her daughter, May Lonsdale, developed into a graphic artist.

In Akulukjuk's adult life, she suffered from poor eyesight, and sometimes she had to use magnifying glasses to create paintings.

== Work at the Pangnirtung Tapestry Studio ==
During the Resettlement Period in the 1960s, Inuit in Canada were relocated due to Canadian government policies, changing their semi-nomadic lifestyle significantly. To aid in this process, the Canadian government funded art and crafts initiatives across the Canadian north and contracted companies to administer and run these programs. Karen Bulow LTD, a weaving company from Montreal, created the Pilot Weaving Program for the Pangnirtung community. In 1970, the project manager Donald Stuart and three women employees arrived to train and begin the program.

The women quickly learned hand-weaving techniques and moved on to loom weaving, creating linear patterns and items like sashes, hats and blankets. These women's early success with weaving can be attributed to their knowledge of finger weaving, which had been introduced by missionaries in the 1930-40s. As well as, their knowledge of how to create traditional Inuit clothing and other items. In celebration of the centennial year (1970) of the Northwest Territories, Queen Elizabeth II visited Frobisher Bay, now Iqaluit, and was given a Pangnirtung Weave Shop blanket. Stuart recalls the Queen remarking how cold it was and "that when the blanket was presented, she put it on and wrapped it around her knees right away." Prince Philip reached over to touch and she said "No, it’s mine!"

The pilot weaving program proved to be successful, and had a positive impact on the surrounding community, however, the cost of the program outweighed the profits made from the items being sold. The goods produced in the Pangnirtung Weave Shop did not have the "Inuit look" which is what customers wanted from northern goods. In response, the program directors decided to shift to producing woven wall hangings or tapestries. To make the tapestries they needed original Inuit drawings to translate into the woven textiles. Stuart took paper and pens throughout the community, asking elders if they wanted to draw. Malaya Akulukjuk, then 51, was one of the first artists discovered. Her drawings set the precedent of what types and style of art was to be showcased on the tapestries. Other artists included Annie Pitsiuluk, Annie Kilabuk and Elisapee Ishulutaq. The first exhibition of the Pangnirtung tapestries was on March 28, 1971, in Montreal. All 23 tapestries were sold to private collectors and museums.

The Pangnirtung Weave Shop was moved into the Uqqurmiut Centre for Arts & Crafts, leading to the central management of all arts and crafts. The centre consolidated the Print Shop, Tapestry Studio, Retail Craft Gallery and an office for administration under one roof. The Centre has continued to serve as a source of cultural identity and pride and as an economic source for the region.

In 2001, the federal department, Indian and Northern Affairs Canada estimated that 20% of the Inuit derive part of their income from arts and crafts programs. Without the work at the Weave Shop or other arts and crafts programs, many would be solely reliant on social assistance money.

== Works and shamanism ==
Although Malaya Akulukjuk did not openly acknowledge her identity, she was reputedly known a angakkuq in the Pangnirtung community. Inuit religion traditionally drew from animism, belieiving that spirits exist in every being and take different forms, such as birds and polar bears. Shaman can maintain a spirit's favour by appropriately practicing her unique abilities, including her power of second sight, her "X-ray" vision, and her control of animal spirits. In Akulukjuk's drawings, she adopts the role of "artist as shaman" by portraying her access to the spiritual world. In which the spiritual world is filled with transformative animals and supernatural beings. Her spirit figures are rooted from her imagination and the stories she had heard in childhood.

In 1972, Akulukjuk's drawing, Oalopalik, depicts a helping spirit which could possibly be her own. During an interview with Asia Papatsie, Akulukjuk confirmed that this helping spirit was a bird that acted as the eyes of the angakkuit. In Inuit beliefs, such a spirit could fly over long distance and report to the angakkuq what it had seen. In Akulukjuk's later artistic career, she started to depict complex themes with multiple characters, and those works continued to communicate her shamanistic beliefs. For instance, her drawing of Two Bears with Skin Frame in 1977 displays two polar bear spirits that live in a different dimension. These spirits are viewed as bear people, who hunt like Inuit but usually live inside a paddle or a rock. In this drawing, the bear people are stretching an animal skin that may have been later used to sew skin clothes.

Akulukjuk's other drawings involve human interactions with birds, and animal spirits that co-exist with humans on the Inuit landscapes. In her drawing Lady with Birds (1977), Akulukjuk depicts a girl who plays with her bird that she may has been tamed from a young age. The girl's hairstyle reveals that she is not married yet. Here, Akulukjuk emphasizes the intimacy between human and animal spirits, which reflects her shamanistic practices because she has personal interactions with those spirits. In another of Akulukjuk's drawings, Malaya’s Story (1981), Inuit and animal spirits are depicted in the same space. While community members are preparing for hunting and food storage, the goose spirit is moving in his own directions. Akulukjuk presents her perspective as an angakkuq by visualizing the co-existence of everyday community life and the spiritual realm.

== Community life ==
In the Pangnirtung Tapestry Studio, the first generation of artists like Malaya Akulukjuk were mostly elders that had previously lived a traditional Inuit life. Akulukjuk was growing up in a whaling station, and lived as a nomadic hunter during her early years. When she adopted her artistic career, she viewed drawing as a way to pass on her rich knowledge of the "true Inuit life" to the younger generation. After the resettlement, drawing was a coping strategy for Akulukjuk to fulfil her responsibility as an elder. In the Tapestry Studio, the weavers are usually young girls in their early twenties and they learned the traditional Inuit past from the elders by transforming their drawings into tapestries.

In Inuit Art Quarterly, the writer states that Inuit elders produce "memory art" instead of commercial art. The elders were eager to tell stories of the past and traditional lifestyles because they were afraid of losing their own identity to the western cultural invasions. Akulukjuk enjoyed using her imagination and memories to present Inuit life of her youth, as well as natural landscapes with tiny human or animal figures. Many of her drawings reconstruct traditional Inuit community life. In 1981, the tapestry of Malaya’s Story demonstrated that Inuit used the whale's body to store food and make tools. They also used sled dogs for transportation, and carried some weapons in their hands when they went out hunting. The other painting, Children at Summer Camp (1980), revealed that Inuit lived in sealskin tents (tupiq) during the summer. The young couple lives in a smaller tent that has seal skin boots (kamik) drying on the poles, while the older couple lives in a bigger tent with a wooden door. The door indicates that the old couple has high status in their community (they are suggested to be prominent hunters) because wood is a very precious resource in the Inuit society.

Akulukjuk's drawings also present her knowledge of land and wildlife in a practical sense. Some of her drawings are purely landscapes scenes of the old Inuit territories, including Spring Breakup (1995), Camp Site (1995) and Inukshuk Trail (1995). These landscape drawings were created at the end of Akulukjuk's life. The artist was eager to go back to these campsites, but she could no longer go out on the land. They revealed Akulukjuk's strong emotional connections and her long-lasting memories of the old Inuit lands. On the other hand, there are pure animal depictions such as Galloping Caribou (1994) and Playful Narwhales (1980) in Akulukjuk's drawings. These animals were commonly seen on Inuit land (called Inuit Nunangat), and they used to be the primary food resources for the survival of the community.

== Cooperation between artists and weavers ==
Tapestry weaving in Pangnirtung has always been a cooperative production that combined the skills of two parties, the drawing artists and the weavers. The submission of the drawing is done by one artist, while the interpretation of the drawing into the medium of tapestry is produced by another artist of the weaving shop. The tapestry artist would choose the colours of the final production, which is rarely discussed with the drawing artist since weavers are believed to have more knowledge about the effective use of colours. Many of Akulukjuk's drawings were made into tapestries by different weavers, and the final productions changed the colours, sizes, and proportions of her original drawings.

For instance, her drawing Children at Summer Camp (1980), was originally created with black and brown pen; while its rich and saturated colours were added by the tapestry artist, Kawtysee Kakee. Moreover, the original drawing has more defined lines, which clearly demonstrate how children engage in everyday activities such as brewing tea and cooking meat. However, in the tapestry production, the surface becomes rough, and the depictions of food are less detailed. The tapestry artist focuses on mixing the soft colours of the wool with a lighter thread, which creates the glow of warm evening light. By creating this natural light, the image is given a sense of time as well as a nostalgic feeling of beauty.

Akulukjuk's drawing, Spring Break (1995), is painted by coloured pencils, which depicts the scene of mountains, valleys and ice fields being lightened by the rising sun. Akulukjuk uses soft colours to portray this scene, including light yellow, blue and white. They create a dreamy atmosphere, and evokes the impression of a paradise rooted from the artist's memory. Compared to the original drawing, the tapestry production adds more layers of perspective to the flat surface by incorporating vivid colours as well as making the mountains look sharp and outstanding.

== Exhibitions ==
Akulukjuk's works have been exhibited in galleries across Canada, including the National Gallery, the Inuit Gallery of Vancouver, the Arts and Crafts Guild of Quebec as well as at the University of Alberta. They even went overseas, and reached as far as the Jerusalem Artists House Museum. Two of Akulukjuk's works, Inuit Ways (1979) and Hunting Polar Bears with Harpoon (1982) are displayed in the National Gallery of Canada in Ottawa. The Heffel Gallery, one of Canada's fine art auction houses, sells Akulukjuk's works as well as the tapestries of weaver Agah Etooangat based on Akulukjuk's drawings.
