= Keenainak =

Inuit surname

Keenainak is an Inuit surname. People with this surname include:

- Ann Martha Keenainak, Inuk Canadian Anglican bishop
- Simeonie Keenainak (born 1948), Inuk Canadian accordionist and law enforcement officer
