= Alexander Pryor =

Canadian Anglican bishop

The Right Reverend Alexander Pryor
- Bishop of the Arctic
- Church: Anglican Church of Canada
- Diocese: Arctic
- In office: 2025–present
- Predecessor: David Parsons
- Other posts: Executive archdeacon, Diocese of the Arctic (2022–2025)

Orders
- Ordination: February 15, 2015 (priesthood) by Charlie Masters
- Consecration: May 11, 2025 by Greg Kerr-Wilson

Personal details
- Born: 1987 or 1988 (age 38–39) Sibley's Cove, Newfoundland and Labrador, Canada
- Spouse: Kristina
- Children: 4
- Education: Memorial University of Newfoundland (B.Mus., B.Mus.Ed.); Nashotah House (M.Div.)

Alexander Roy Pryor is a Canadian Anglican bishop. Since 2025, he has been the diocesan bishop of the Diocese of The Arctic in the Anglican Church of Canada.

== Early life and education ==
Pryor was born in Sibley's Cove, Newfoundland and Labrador, to a fisherman father and fish-plant worker mother. They relocated to St. John's after the closure of the cod fishery. He grew up attending church; at age 9, he began playing the organ for his local Anglican church, and by 12 was leading music during services. As a young adult, he was also licensed as a eucharistic assistant and subdeacon. Pryor attended Memorial University of Newfoundland, where he earned a B.Mus. in organ and a B.Mus.Ed. During his studies, he was music minister at the newly planted Anglican Church of the Good Samaritan in St. John's. He was also chosen as a youth delegate of the Anglican Network in Canada to the founding provincial assembly of the Anglican Church in North America in Bedford, Texas.

Receiving a call to ministry, Pryor then he went on to Nashotah House, where he obtained an M.Div in 2014. He was ordained a deacon in 2013 and a priest in February 14 at the Church of the Good Samaritan in a service presided over by Bishop Charlie Masters of the Anglican Network in Canada. Pryor then spent five years working at Nashotah House, where he conducted the St. Mary's Choristers and the Choral Scholars of Nashotah House, established a workshop for church musicians, ran the chapel program with 14 weekly services and introduced sacred music and liturgical leadership into the seminary's hybrid-distance program. During this time, in 2016, he moved from the ACNA to the ACC, becoming canonically resident in the Anglican Diocese of Calgary.

== Ministry in the Arctic ==
In 2019, Pryor was called as rector of St. John's Anglican Church in Fort Smith, Northwest Territories. In 2022, he became executive archdeacon of the Diocese of the Arctic. The combination of significantly higher insurance and operating expenses, combined with a reduction in the mission funding provided for the diocese through the ACC's Council of the North, shaped Pryor's role in managing the diocese's finances. He was involved in planning the redevelopment of derelict church property in Apex, Baker Lake, Pangnirtung and other communities through the Anglican Arctic Development Corporation. "The change in the funding for the Council of the North has made it so clear that now is the time to go forward with developing the land that we have across the North to make our churches more sustainable, so that we're not spending as much on utilities and maintenance for standalone church buildings when communities really have a need for office space and community hall space—and especially for housing, because we've got a housing crisis right across the North," Pryor told Anglican Journal. In 2025, the diocesan synod passed a measure creating the Arctic Anglican Development Corporation, which would facilitate the development of energy-efficient multipurpose buildings that include offices, daycare facilities and affordable housing (including clergy housing) on lightly used church lands.

Pryor also set up a low-power radio transmitter at St. Jude's Cathedral in Iqaluit, which allowed the cathedral to broadcast services, music and other programming in Inuktitut in the local area. The project was funded by a grant from St. Paul's, Bloor Street. Pryor also co-wrote curriculum for the diocese's Arthur Turner Training School for clergy.

On May 9, 2025, Pryor was elected the diocese's seventh bishop at the diocesan synod in Edmonton, Alberta. Due to the high cost of travel in the Arctic, bishops from the Ecclesiastical Province of the Northern Lights were present to consent to the election, and Archbishop Greg Kerr-Wilson consecrated Pryor as a bishop alongside new suffragan bishops Jared Osborn and Ann Martha Keenainak on May 11.

== Personal life ==
Pryor is married to Kristina; they have four children.
