= Ann Martha Keenainak =

Inuk Canadian Anglican bishop

The Right Reverend Ann Martha Keenainak
- Bishop Suffragan of the Diocese of the Arctic
- Native name: ᐋᓐ ᒫᑕ ᑮᓇᐃᓐᓇᖅ
- Church: Anglican Church of Canada
- Diocese: Arctic
- In office: 2025–present
- Other posts: Regional dean for Ungava (2019–2020), South Baffin (2021–2025)

Orders
- Ordination: June 27, 2018 (diaconate); January 2020 (priesthood) by Darren McCartney (diaconate)
- Consecration: May 11, 2025 by Greg Kerr-Wilson

Personal details
- Born: Pangnirtung, Northwest Territories, Canada
- Parents: Simeonie Keenainak (father)
- Children: 3

Ann Martha Keenainak (Inuktitut: ᐋᓐ ᒫᑕ ᑮᓇᐃᓐᓇᖅ) is an Inuk Canadian Anglican bishop. Since 2025, she has been one of three suffragan bishops of the Diocese of the Arctic in the Anglican Church of Canada (ACC).

== Early life and career ==
Keenainak is a native of Pangnirtung, Baffin Island, where she was born to Simeonie and Daisy Keenainak.

From 1996 to 2015, Keenainak worked a variety of jobs across Nunavut, including as a Royal Canadian Mounted Police constable in Rankin Inlet, a heavy equipment operator for Tower Arctic in Pangnirtung and a cargo agent for First Air. In 2002, she completed the RCMP cadet training in Regina, Saskatchewan.

== Ordained ministry ==
Keenainak had been involved in church long before ordination but did not consider it until the end of her time in the Diocese of the Arctic's Arthur Turner Training School (ATTS). She was ordained to the diaconate in 2018 by Suffragan Bishop Darren McCartney, then took her first pastorate at St. James Anglican Church in Salluit, Quebec. Her ordination to the priesthood followed in January 2020. She later served as priest in charge in Kuujjuaq from 2019 to 2020, and from 2021 to 2023 in Pangnirtung, where she used radio to offer Inuktitut sermons and services during the COVID-19 pandemic. She moved to St. Jude's Cathedral in Iqaluit to be an assisting priest from 2023 until 2025, where she also taught ATTS courses in Inuktitut. She is a board member of Alongside Hope, an Anglican charity formerly known as the Primate's World Relief and Development Fund.

In 2023, Keenainak represented the diocese as a delegate to the ACC's General Synod, where she opposed the creation of gender transition and affirmation liturgies. According to Anglican Journal, she said during debate that "the process felt 'rushed' in comparison to time it took to address many Indigenous concerns. She cited the difficulty in explaining the resolution to youth back home and translating it. "I'm opposed to this as it’s uncomfortable to be rushed into something . . . I'm just speechless," Keenainak said. "[It's] not for us to lean onto our own understanding of being."

On May 9, 2025, Keenainak was elected a suffragan bishop at the diocesan synod in Edmonton, Alberta. Due to the high cost of travel in the Arctic, bishops from the Ecclesiastical Province of the Northern Lights were present to consent to the election, and Archbishop Greg Kerr-Wilson consecrated Keenainak as a bishop alongside new suffragan bishop Jared Osborn and diocesan bishop Alexander Pryor on May 11.

== Personal life ==
Keenainak is a single mother of three grown children. She is a musician who has performed at the Pangnirtung Music Festival.
