= Joey Royal =

Canadian Anglican bishop

The Right Reverend Joey Royal
- Bishop Suffragan of the Diocese of the Arctic
- Church: Anglican Church of Canada
- Diocese: Arctic
- In office: 2019–2024
- Other posts: Rector, Holy Trinity Anglican Church, Yellowknife; Director, Arthur Turner Training School

Orders
- Consecration: March 31, 2019 by Michael Hawkins

Personal details
- Born: 1980 or 1981 (age 45–46)

Joseph Robert "Joey" Royal (born 1980 or 1981) is a Canadian Anglican bishop. From 2019 to 2024, he was one of three suffragan bishops of the Diocese of the Arctic in the Anglican Church of Canada (ACC).

== Early life and education ==
Royal grew up in northern Ontario in a family affiliated with the Plymouth Brethren. He has Mi’kmaq ancestry on his mother's side. He became Anglican during college and was ordained as a priest after graduating from Providence University College and Theological Seminary near Winnipeg, and Huron University College in London, Ontario.

== Ordained ministry ==
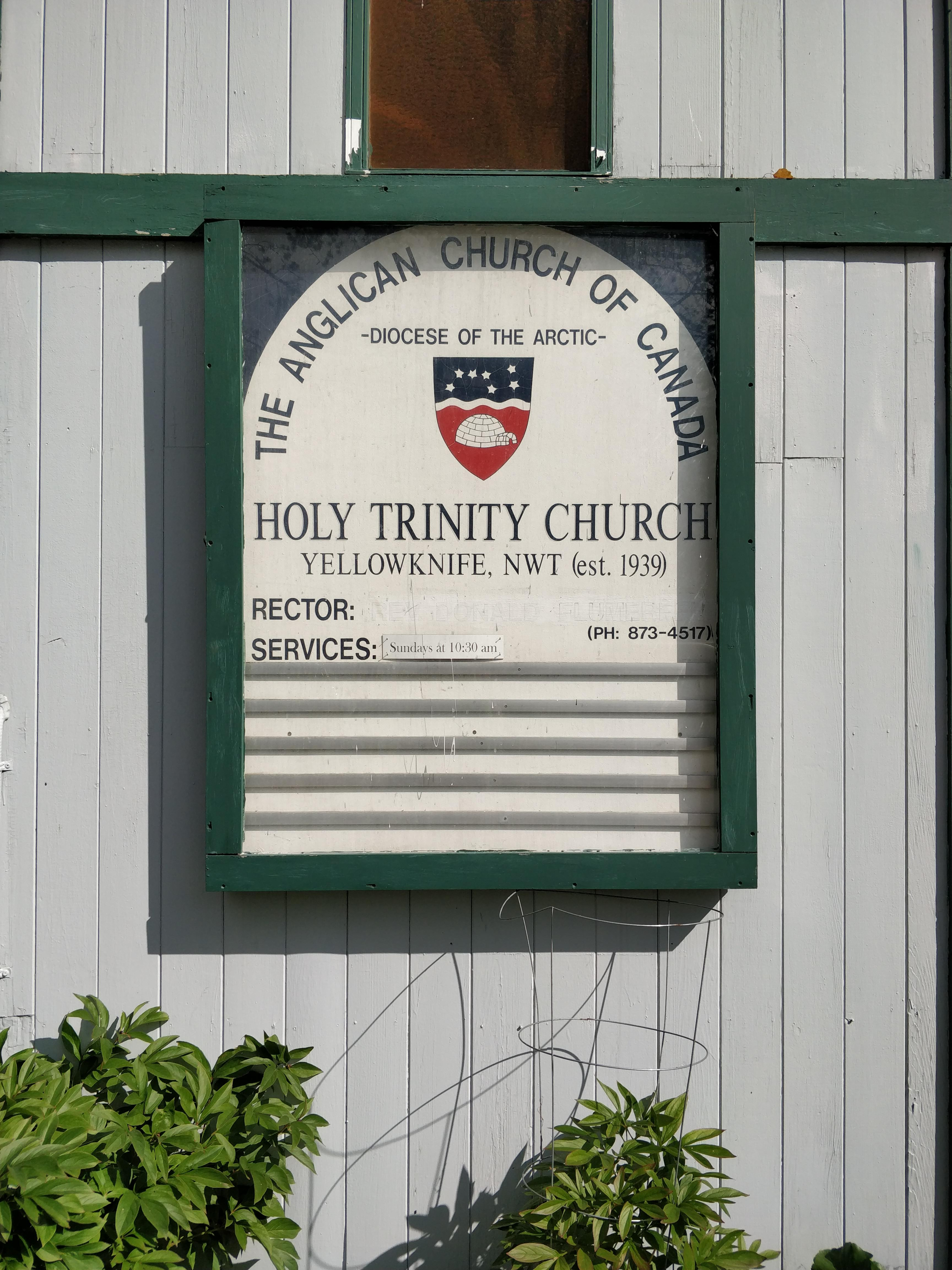
Holy Trinity Anglican Church in Yellowknife.

Royal was rector of Holy Trinity Anglican Church in Yellowknife, Northwest Territories, until 2015, when he moved to Iqaluit, Nunavut, to be director and lead instructor at the newly reopened Arthur Turner Training School (ATTS), the diocesan pastoral training program of the Diocese of the Arctic. The school, which offers in-person and virtual training for diaconal candidates and lay ministers in the geographically far-flung but lightly populated Arctic region, was housed at the new St. Jude's Cathedral. Courses were offered in both English and Inuktitut. The school uses curriculum resources and partnership from Trinity School for Ministry, a seminary of the Anglican Church in North America (ACNA).

At the diocese's triennial synod in Yellowknife in March 2019, Royal was elected and consecrated a suffragan bishop alongside Annie Ittoshat and Lucy Netser. Due to the high costs and difficulty of travel in the diocese, bishops from the Province of Rupert's Land were on hand to confirm the election and consecrate the new bishops on March 31. Royal's specific responsibilities were theological education and the High Arctic and Southern Baffin Island regions. In 2023, Royal returned to Yellowknife to serve as rector of Holy Trinity.

Royal resigned as a suffragan bishop of the Diocese of the Arctic, rector of Holy Trinity and head of ATTS effective October 20, 2024. He and his family moved to Ottawa where Royal took up a role with Christian Embassy of Canada.

=== Anglican realignment ===
Royal, along with the Diocese of the Arctic, remained in the ACC during the Anglican realignment. However, like other Arctic bishops, Royal has opposed theologically liberal trends in the Anglican Church. As a bishop, he voted against the proposed 2019 change to the church's marriage canon that would have officially permitted same-sex marriages; the measure failed to secure the necessary majority among the church's bishops during the vote at General Synod. "As a diocese we’ve been very clear that we’re opposed to changing it, and our opposition on this is due simply to our conviction that male-female marriage is divinely given and rooted in creation itself," Royal said in 2019. "That is how I understand Scripture. I am convinced as well that a change to the Marriage Canon will be destructive to community and relationships at the local, national and international level."

In 2023, alongside the other Arctic bishops, Royal objected to the ACC's approval of gender transition liturgies and said they would not be authorized in the diocese.

While remaining in the ACC, Royal has also showed openness to Anglican realignment churches. Due to the difficulty of finding clergy in the Arctic region, he has worked to ensure that the Diocese of the Arctic can continue to license clergy from the ACNA, which is not in communion with the ACC at the provincial level. In 2023, Royal and Arctic Bishop David Parsons were the only ACC bishops to attend the Global Anglican Future Conference in Kigali. Royal, who serves on the Anglican Consultative Council's Inter-Anglican Standing Committee on Unity, Faith and Order, has said he "hold[s] out hope that the Instruments of Communion can be restructured from within, and that sufficient differentiation can be possible across the Anglican world without a total and irreparable rupture happening. And if such can be avoided it will be only because of the mercy of God, and not because of human scheming or ingenuity."

== Personal life ==
Royal is married to Jennifer; they have one son.
