= Annie Ittoshat =

Inuk Canadian Anglican bishop

The Right Reverend Annie Ittoshat D.D.
- Bishop Suffragan of the Diocese of the Arctic
- Church: Anglican Church of Canada
- Diocese: Arctic
- In office: 2019–present
- Other posts: Lead pastor, St. James Anglican Church, Salluit

Orders
- Ordination: 2006 (diaconate)
- Consecration: March 31, 2019 by Michael Hawkins

Personal details
- Born: Annie Napartuk; 1970 (age 55–56) Kuujjuarapik, Quebec
- Spouse: Noah
- Children: 5

Annie Napartuk Ittoshat (born 1970) is an Inuk Canadian Anglican bishop. Since 2019, she has been one of three suffragan bishops of the Diocese of the Arctic in the Anglican Church of Canada (ACC). Alongside Lucy Netser, who was elected and consecrated at the same time, she is the first female Inuk bishop in the world.

== Early life, career and education ==
Annie Napartuk was born in 1970 in Kuujjuarapik, a community on Hudson Bay in Quebec. When she was young, her Inuk parents were forced to leave their coastal camps as part of an effort to "civilize" their nomadic lifestyle; her father had his sled dogs slaughtered and her brothers were removed to residential schools. Napartuk was too young for a residential school, but she experienced the trauma of seeing her parents succumb to alcoholism.

Napartuk married Noah Ittoshat; as of 2021, they had five grown children and four grandchildren. In 2001, the Ittoshats moved to Montreal for Annie to attend John Abbott College, studying social science with a goal of going into social work. Midway through her studies, she received a call to ordained ministry and moved to Pangnirtung, Nunavut, to study at the Diocese of the Arctic's Arthur Turner Training School. She was ordained to the diaconate in 2006 and served in Kangiqsujuaq.

Ittoshat returned to John Abbott College and finished her degree in 2010, then completed her M.Div. at Wycliffe College in Toronto in 2013, where she was the first Inuk woman to graduate.

== Priesthood and episcopacy ==
After completing seminary and being ordained as the first female Inuk Anglican priest in Quebec, Ittoshat moved to the Anglican Diocese of Montreal to establish an Inuktitut-speaking church for the roughly 1,000 Inuit who live in the Montreal area. She later served as a priest at Church of the Epiphany in Verdun and was elected to the ACC's Anglican Council of Indigenous Peoples. During her time in Montreal, her husband, a miner in Northern Quebec, worked on a rotating schedule to allow him to spend time with the family in the south.

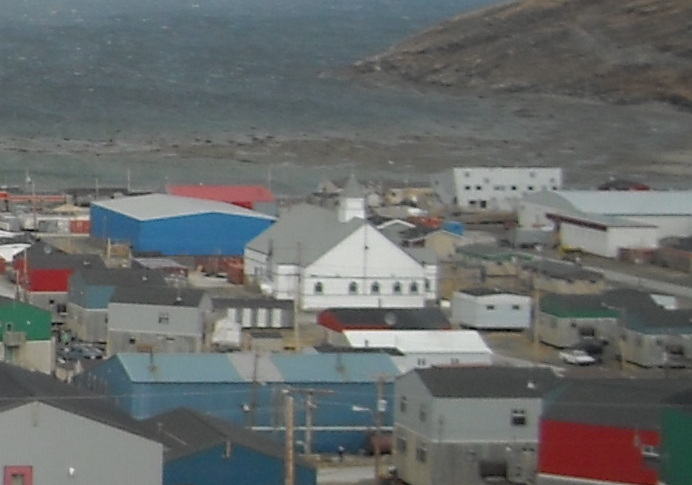
St. James Anglican Church, Ittoshat's church in Salluit.

At the Diocese of the Arctic's triennial synod in Yellowknife in March 2019, Ittoshat was elected and consecrated a suffragan bishop alongside Joey Royal and Lucy Netser. Due to the high costs and difficulty of travel in the diocese, bishops from the Province of Rupert's Land were on hand to confirm the election and consecrate the new bishops on March 31. Ittoshat moved north to serve simultaneously as lead pastor at St. James Anglican Church in Salluit; her episcopal responsibilities included the parishes along Hudson Bay and the Ungava Peninsula.

In 2021, Ittoshat received an honorary doctorate from Wycliffe College.

Like other Arctic bishops, Ittoshat has opposed theologically liberal trends in the Anglican Church. During the 2016 General Synod effort to amend the marriage canon to permit same-sex marriages in the ACC, Ittoshat spoke in opposition, noting that “[i]t is not about unconditional love. It is about what is clearly written in the word of God.” As a bishop, she voted against the proposed 2019 change, and the measure failed to secure the necessary majority among the church's bishops during the vote at General Synod.

In 2023, alongside the other Arctic bishops, Ittoshat objected to the ACC's approval of gender transition liturgies and said they would not be authorized in the diocese.
