= Netser =

Netser is an Inuit surname. Notable people with the surname include:

- Lucy Netser (fl. from 2006), Canadian Anglican bishop
- Patterk Netser (fl. from 2003), Canadian politician
