= David Parsons (bishop) =

Canadian Anglican bishop (born 1954)

The Right Reverend Captain David W. Parsons
- Bishop of the Arctic
- Church: Anglican Church of Canada
- Diocese: Arctic
- In office: 2012–2024
- Predecessor: Andrew Atagotaaluk
- Successor: Alexander Pryor

Orders
- Ordination: 2004 (priesthood) by Andrew Atagotaaluk
- Consecration: 3 June 2012 by David Ashdown

Personal details
- Born: 1954 (age 71–72) Labrador

David W. Parsons (born 1954) is a Canadian Anglican bishop. He was the bishop of the Diocese of the Arctic in northern Canada from 2012 until his retirement at the end of 2024.

== Early life and career ==
Parsons was born in Labrador and raised in Goose Bay. He began his career with Canada Post but left the postal service to travel with Canada World Youth. After training in electronics, he began working with Canadian National telecom, where he met his future wife, Rita.

In 1979, David and Rita Parsons traveled through Europe in a camper van. After participating in what Parsons described as a supernatural healing in Portugal, he decided he wanted to pursue Christian ministry. Parsons studied with the Church Army's training organisation in Toronto. He was commissioned as an evangelist in 1989 in the Church Army. His first post as a lay minister was in Aklavik, Northwest Territories, where he served for four years. The Parsons then moved to Saint John, New Brunswick, where he ran a Church Army hospital hostel and the local Mission to Seafarers, coordinated refugee ministries for the Diocese of Fredericton and helped run a teen ministry for the diocese.

== Ordained ministry ==
Parsons was ordained in 2004 and was sent as a priest to Inuvik. He later became incumbent in Tulita and dean of the Mackenzie Delta deanery.

He was elected to succeed Andrew Atagotaaluk as diocesan bishop in 2012. To respond to the suicide crisis in the Arctic, Parsons hired a youth coordinator for at-risk teenagers and obtained a grant to train local church leaders in suicide prevention.

A theological conservative, Parsons and then-suffragan bishop Darren McCartney were the only Anglican Church of Canada (ACC) bishops to attend the 2013 Global Anglican Future Conference (GAFCON) in Nairobi. Parsons also attended the 2023 GAFCON in Kigali. He opposed efforts to introduce same-sex marriage blessings in the ACC.

Parsons retired as bishop at the end of 2024.

== Personal life ==
David and Rita Parsons retired to Hampton, New Brunswick. They have three grown sons and four grandchildren as of 2024.

== Notes ==
Anglican Communion titles
Preceded by Andrew Atagotaaluk	Bishop of the Arctic; 2012–2024	Succeeded by Alexander Pryor
