= Jared Osborn =

American-Canadian Anglican bishop (born 1986)

The Right Reverend Jared Osborn
- Bishop Suffragan of the Diocese of the Arctic
- Church: Anglican Church of Canada
- Diocese: Arctic
- In office: 2025–present
- Other post: Regional dean for Kivalliq

Orders
- Ordination: July 11, 2015 (diaconate); May 2016 (priesthood) by Robert Duncan (diaconate)
- Consecration: May 11, 2025 by Greg Kerr-Wilson

Personal details
- Born: April 23, 1986 (age 40)
- Spouse: The Rev. Rebecca Osborn
- Children: 3
- Education: Cedarville University (B.S.); Trinity School for Ministry (M.Div.)

Jared Osborn (born April 23, 1986) is a U.S.-born Canadian Anglican bishop. First ordained as a deacon in 2015 alongside his wife, Rebecca, Osborn's entire ministry has been spent as a missionary in Nunavut within the Anglican Church of Canada's Diocese of The Arctic, first in Iqaluit and then in Rankin Inlet. Since 2025, he has been one of three suffragan bishops of the Diocese of the Arctic.

== Early life and education ==
Osborn grew up in Maryland and graduated from Montgomery Blair High School. He received his undergraduate education at Cedarville University. After working as a software engineer at the Johns Hopkins University Applied Physics Laboratory, he and his wife, Rebecca Osborn, moved to Ambridge, Pennsylvania, to enroll in Trinity School for Ministry.

== Ordained ministry ==
While at Trinity, the Osborns attended an information session on ministry in the evangelical Diocese of the Arctic. After further conversation with diocesan staff, the visited Iqaluit and decided to go to the Arctic as missionaries. In July 2015, they were ordained as deacons in the Anglican Diocese of Pittsburgh, after which they relocated to Canada.

The Osborns began their ministry at St. Jude's Cathedral in Iqaluit, where they shared an assisting clergy post and learned Inuktitut. They were ordained to the priesthood there in 2016. Jared spent one year as interim rector of the cathedral. In 2019, he was appointed priest in charge of Holy Comforter Anglican Church in Rankin Inlet and regional dean for Kivalliq. He is also an instructor at the diocese's Arthur Turner Training School.

On May 9, 2025, Osborn was elected a suffragan bishop at the diocesan synod in Edmonton, Alberta. Due to the high cost of travel in the Arctic, bishops from the Ecclesiastical Province of the Northern Lights were present to consent to the election, and Archbishop Greg Kerr-Wilson consecrated Osborn as a bishop alongside new suffragan bishop Ann Martha Keenainak and diocesan bishop Alexander Pryor on May 11.

== Personal life ==
As of 2025, the Osborns lived in Rankin Inlet with their three daughters. They became Canadian citizens in 2022. Osborn is a volunteer firefighter and was recognized in 2025 as fire officer of the year in Rankin Inlet.
