= Elisapee Ishulutaq =

- ᐃᓕᓴᐱ ᐃᓱᓗᑕᖅ
- Born: 1925; Kangirterjuak Camp, Northwest Territories
- Died: 9 December 2018 (aged 93); Pangnirtung, Nunavut
- Known for: Oil stick drawing, illustrations for prints and tapestries

Elisapee Ishulutaq CM (Inuktitut: ᐃᓕᓴᐱ ᐃᓱᓗᑕᖅ, 1925 – 9 December 2018) was a self-taught Inuk artist, specialising in drawing and printmaking. Ishulutaq participated in the rise of print and tapestry making in Pangnirtung and was a co-founder of the Uqqurmiut Centre for Arts & Crafts, which is both an economic and cultural mainstay in Pangnirtung. Ishulutaq was also a community elder in the town of Pangnirtung. Ishulutaq's work has been shown in numerous institutions, including the Marion Scott Gallery in Vancouver, the Winnipeg Art Gallery and the National Gallery of Canada.

Ishulutaq saw herself as a bridge between generations, using visual representations to pass on the wisdom of her community's elders. In 2014, Ishulutaq was awarded the Order of Canada "for her contributions to the cultural and economic health of her community as a role model and mentor".

== Early life and family ==
Elisapee Ishulutaq was born 1925 in Kangirterjuak Camp, Northwest Territories. In the 1930s Ishulutaq lived off the land of Baffin Island near Cumberland Sound with her family, including her mother Avurnirq, father Arnaqua, sister Malaya, and adopted brother Silassie Arnaquq. Although little is known about her early life, as a child she lived a nomadic hunting life which is the source of her inspiration in many of her later works. Elisapee Ishulutaq started her artistic career relatively late in life, after she moved to Pangnirtung at the age of forty-five.

Ishulutaq's oil stick drawing Nunagah (2009) portrays many members of Ishulutaq's family including her parents, her siblings, her husband Kanayuk, and firstborn son Lasalucie. Jaco Ishulutaq, another of Ishulutaq's sons (not depicted in Nunagah), has become a well known carver in Pangnirtung.

== Political focus ==
In addition to her works documenting her childhood, some of Elisapee Ishulutaq's recent work deals with two arctic political agendas: advocacy for the suicide crisis within Inuit communities in the arctic, and environmentalism.

=== Works related to Inuit suicide ===
Ishulutaq's work In His Memory (2016) depicts scenes from her community in the 1990s after a young boy committed suicide. It is a 9-metre-long drawing split into four images: (1) people leaving a grave; (2) mourners walking towards a church; (3) a figure standing on shore in front of a boat; and (4) a figure lying alongside a seated woman with the subtitle Vigil with Bird. While making the art piece, Ishulutaq encouraged children into the room to make their own drawings with her. About In His Memory, Ishulutaq has said that: "I drew it so that young people would not choose suicide as a solution to their problems".

In His Memory was exhibited in the Marion Scott Gallery/Kardosh Projects in Vancouver in 2016. News organisations such as the Canadian Broadcasting Corporation and the Vancouver Sun reported on the project.

=== Works related to environmentalism ===
Some of Ishulutaq's works focus on climate change such as the work titled Climate Change (2012). Ishulutaq has commented on environmentalism in art as follows:

"When I was young the ice was not dangerous... now it's getting dangerous, and through art artists can get it out there, sharing that the ice is getting dangerous. Nowadays hunters don't really listen to elders for their knowledge or wisdom and having some sort of visual aid like art would really put a clearer picture into what the elders are trying to say."

Ishulutaq also appears in Zacharias Kunuk and Ian Mauro's film Inuit Knowledge and Climate Change (2010). This is the first Inuktitut-language film that addresses global warming, considering Inuit traditional knowledge and its role in discourse of environmentalism.

== Artistic career ==
Elisapee Ishulutaq worked primarily in oil stick since 2009, however she began drawing with colored pencils in 1960. At the age of 45 Ishulutaq moved to Pangnirtung, and began to contribute illustrations to the Pangnirtung print and tapestry workshops. Ishulutaq has been a contributor to the Pangnirtung print and tapestry workshops for 40 years, as long as the arts and crafts industry has existed in Pangnirtung. Ishulutaq was also one of the original contributors to the Pangnirtung annual catalogue of prints. Ishulutaq is the last living artist to have contributed to this original catalogue that was published in 1973. For her drawings that have been translated into prints, Ishulutaq collaborated on many occasions with artist Paul Machnik, the founder of PM Studios in Montreal.

=== Artistic inspiration ===
Many of her recent oil stick drawings are large-scale pieces; for example, her work In His Memory (2016) is 30 meters long, and Nunagah (2009) is 5 feet tall and 30 feet long. Her works often depict autobiographical scenes, which differs from common Inuit subject matter of contemporary life. Ishulutaq's works often explore the hardships she faced growing up. Ishulutaq's works are characterised by her use of multiple perspectives in the same image and focus on everyday life. Ishulutaq claims that the concept of legacy was her initial incentive for the creation of art:

"The main reason for making art being that the future generations could see my work... I would leave a footprint so to speak... to be able to share history through images."

Ishulutaq believed that art can help bridge the gap between elders and the younger generation, using visual motifs to pass along knowledge that would otherwise have been lost. She has also said that art was therapeutic and could help an individual work through anxieties. Ishulutaq remained an active participant in the Pangnirtung workshop until her death, continuing to explore new styles of art and new media.

=== Early works ===
Ishulutaq began contributing to the print workshop in 1970–1971. Early prints from Ishulutaq's drawings often included multiple perspectives, and large solitary figures of people, birds, and people, floating on a neutral background. During the establishment of the Tapestry Studio in Pangnirtung in the early 1970s, Ishulutaq and Malaya Akulukjuk were the workshop's sole illustrators. Ishulutaq's drawings were included in the first exhibition of Pagnirtung tapestries, In the Beginning, which was held in 1972 at the Canadian Guild of Crafts in Montreal. This exhibition included Ishulutaq's drawing Woman, which was woven by Oleepa Papatsie-Brown.

=== Recent works ===
In 2009, Ishulutaq created the work Nunagah (My Home Place) as part of the 2012 Canadian Biennial with the National Gallery of Canada. The Biennial was entitled "Builders" referring to the contribution of artists such as Ishulutaq to contemporary art and art mentorship. In 2014, Ishulutaq was commissioned to create a mural titled Yesterday and Today for the Winnipeg Art Gallery. This mural features scenes of the artist's everyday life and was commissioned by curator Darlene Coward Wight, who said this of Ishulutaq's work:

"Her use of multiple perspectives, employing frontal, profile, and bird’s eye view in the same image is also characteristic, and these unexpected shifts add interests and liveliness to her detailed scenes."

In 2016, Ishulutaq was commissioned to create the mural In His Memory as a memorial to the suicide of a young boy in her community. This piece was created in collaboration with the students of the local school as well as the artists Paul Machnik and his daughter Maica Armata-Machnik. This mural was reportedly Ishulutaq's "finale", as the then-91-year-old artist claimed that she would no longer participate in any large-scale creations.

In 2013, Ishulutaq illustrated Vera Avic's Inuit children's story Trip to the Moon.

Ishulutaq also continued to provide drawings for the yearly Pangnirtung Print Collection. In 2010, the collection contained 2 of Ishulutaq's drawings. The drawings depicted a scene from Pangnirtung and a streetscape of condominiums in Vancouver from a trip Ishulutaq took to British Columbia for an exhibition. The 2011 collection also included Ishulutaq's International Formation: Two Canadians, one American & one German Fly the Arctic.

== Death ==
Ishulutaq died on 9 December 2018 at her home in Pangnirtung, aged 93.

== Awards ==
Ishulutaq was part of the Pangnirtung experimental graphic workshop from 1970–1971. Shortly after in the year of 1973 at the California College of Arts and Crafts International Print Competition she won the award of merit for the design of her print "Three Bears". Her most notable award was in 2013, when she was made a member of the Order of Canada.

== Exhibitions ==
=== Solo exhibitions ===
- Elisapee Ishulutaq: Remembering a Future, Too, Marion Scott Gallery, Vancouver British Columbia (October 22 – December 3, 2016).
- Elisappee Ishultaq: Drawings and Prints, Marion Scott Gallery, Vancouver, British Columbia (August 12-September 16, 2016). 28 recent paper and oilstick drawings and large scale etchings. These works were based on memories (e.g. family and friends, playful rather than working children, hardships.
- Elisapee Ishulutaq: Yesterday and Today, Winnipeg Art Gallery, Winnipeg, Manitoba (2015). Curated by Darlene Coward Wight.
- Elisapee Ishulutaq: Prints from Pangnirtung, Marion Scott Gallery, Vancouver, British Columbia (July 4 – 26, 2014).
- Ishuluak, Winnipeg Art Gallery, Winnipeg, Manitoba (2010).
- Carvings by Elisapee Ishulutaq, Galerie aux Multiples, Quebec City, Quebec (June–July 1990).
- Elisapee Ishulutaq: a comprehensive exhibit including sculpture, prints, drawings & tapestries, Eskimo Art Gallery, Montreal, Quebec (May–June 1989). Illustrated catalogue.

=== Group exhibitions ===
- National Craft Exhibition: Can Craft? Craft Can! Canadian Craft Biennial, Lee-Chin Family Gallery, Art Gallery of Burlington, Burlington, Ontario (August – October 2017).
- Raise a flag: works from the Indigenous Arts Collection, Ontario College of Art and Design University Onsite Gallery, Toronto, Ontario (2017).
- Idols and Impossible Structures: New Prints 2017/ Winter, International Print Centre, New York City, New York (2017). Included Ishulutaq's prints Who Are You? What is Your Name? (2015) and Brother and Sister Greeting (2015).
- Builders: Canadian Biennial 2012, National Gallery of Canada, Ottawa, Ontario (November 2, 2012 – January 20, 2013)
- Eight Women, Marion Scott Gallery, Vancouver British Columbia (August 3 – September 14, 2013).
- Pangnirtung Tapestries-40th Anniversary, Inuit Art Gallery of Vancouver, Vancouver, British Columbia (February 23 – March 2010).
- New Voices from the New North, National Gallery of Canada, Ottawa, Ontario (2013).
- Oil on Paper New Work from the Studios of Pangnirtung, Nunavut, Marion Scott Gallery, Vancouver, British Columbia (July 17 – August 28, 2010).
- Nuvisavik: "The Place Where We Weave", Inuit Tapestries from Arctic Canada, McCord Museum, Montreal, Quebec (November 2006-March 2007).
- Keeping Our Stories Alive: An Exhibition of the Art and Crafts from Dene and Inuit of Canada, Dene and Inuit of Canada Institute of American Indian Arts Museum, Santa Fe, New Mexico (May–September, 1995). Illustrated catalogue.
- Contemporary Art from Pangnirtung, The Art Gallery, Mount Saint Vincent University, Halifax, Nova Scotia (1991).
- Chisel and Brush/Le ciseau et la brosse, Department of Indian Affairs and North Development, Ottawa, Ontario (June 1985-September 1987). Tour/illustrated catalogue featuring Ishulutaq's print Woman Thinking (Josee Maniapik was the respective printmaker).
- Pangnirtung Tapestries/Tapisseries de Pangnirtung, Canadian Guild of Crafts, Montreal, Quebec (1972).
- Inuit Games and Contests; The Clifford E. Lee Collection of Prints, University of Alberta, Edmonton, Alberta (August 1978) Illustrated catalogue.
- Looking South, Winnipeg Art Gallery, Winnipeg, Manitoba (1978). Tour/illustrated catalogue.
- The Inuit Print/L'estampe Inuit, Department of Indian Affairs and Northern Development, and the National Museum of Man, Ottawa, Ontario (January 1977 – June 1982)
- Crafts from Arctic Canada/ Arrtisanat de l'arctique canadien, Canadian Eskimo Arts Council Ottawa, Ontario (1976). Tour and illustrated catalogue.
- Inuit Games/Inuit Pinguangit/Jeux des Inuit, Department of Indian Affairs and Northern Development, Ottawa, Ontario (October 1975 – December 1977). Tour, illustrated brochure.
- First Collection of Prints from Pangnirtung, The Inuit Gallery of Eskimo Art, Toronto, Ontario (April 1973).

== Collections ==
Elisapee Ishulutaq's work is presented in private and public collections.

=== Public collections ===
- Art Gallery of Ontario (Toronto)
- Canadian Museum of History
- Clifford E. Collection of Inuit Wall Handing, University of Alberta Art and Artefact Collection
- Marion Scott Art Gallery, Vancouver, British Columbia
- Montreal Museum of Fine Arts, Montreal, Quebec
- Musée national des beaux-arts du Québec
- National Gallery of Canada, Ottawa, Ontario
- Ontario College of Art and Design University Onsite Gallery
- Pangnirtung Print Collection (circa 1973, 1975, 1976, 1977, 1980, 1982, 1983, 1984, 1994, 1995, 2010)
- Winnipeg Art Gallery, Winnipeg, Manitoba
- Woodstock Art Gallery Inuit Art Collection, Woodstock, Ontario

=== Private collections ===
- Collection of Susan and Bill Cale, Harrisonburg, Virginia. Contains tapestry of Ishulutak's drawing Laden Hunter (1979)
- Collection of Ms. Margaret Hickman. contains tapestry of Ishulutak's drawing Father and Son Returning from Seal Hunting
- Collection of Renata Hulley, Ottawa, Ontario. Contains tapestry of Ishulutak's drawing Inuit Ways (1979)

== Symposiums ==
Ishulutaq participated in the Inuit Modern Symposium at the Art Gallery of Ontario in Spring 2011. In this symposium, Inuit artists and thinkers, including Kenojuak Ashevak reflect on the question "It is not who we are, but where we come from and where we are going". The symposium was scheduled in conjunction with the opening of Inuit Modern: The Esther and Samual Sarick Collection of Inuit Art.
