= Archibald Fleming =

Anglican bishop (1883–1953)

The Right Reverend Archibald Fleming L.Th., D.D., F.R.G.S.
- Bishop of the Arctic
- Church: Church of England in Canada
- Diocese: Arctic
- In office: 1933–1949
- Successor: Donald Marsh

Orders
- Ordination: 13 April 1913 by John Anderson
- Consecration: 21 December 1933 by Isaac Stringer

Personal details
- Born: 8 September 1883 Greenock, Renfrewshire, Scotland
- Died: 17 May 1953 (aged 69) Toronto, Ontario, Canada
- Buried: Maitland Cemetery, Goderich, Ontario
- Denomination: Anglican
- Parents: Janet Livingstone & John Fleming
- Spouse: Helen Grace Gillespie; Elizabeth Nelson Lukens

Archibald Lang Fleming FRGS (8 September 1883 – 17 May 1953) was the inaugural Bishop of The Arctic from 1933 to 1949.

== Biography ==
Fleming was educated at Greenock Academy and the University of Glasgow. He was in the drawing office at John Brown & Co, a shipyard in Clydebank, until 1906 when he went to Canada to prepare for missionary work at Wycliffe College. Ordained in 1912, he was a missionary in Baffin Island until 1916. Later he was Chaplain of his old theological college then Rector of Saint John, New Brunswick. He was Archdeacon of The Arctic from 1927 to his appointment to the episcopate. He was also a noted author.

John Buchan, Lord Tweedsmuir, the Governor General of Canada, wrote to Fleming on his appointment as Bishop: Your official signature 'Archibald the Arctic' is the most romantic signature in the world and just one point ahead of 'William of Argyll and the Isles'. Fleming's memoir Archibald the Arctic was published in 1957.

Anglican Communion titles
New title	Bishop of The Arctic; 1933 – 1949	Succeeded by Donald Marsh
