= Diocese of the Arctic =

Diocese of the Anglican Church in Canada

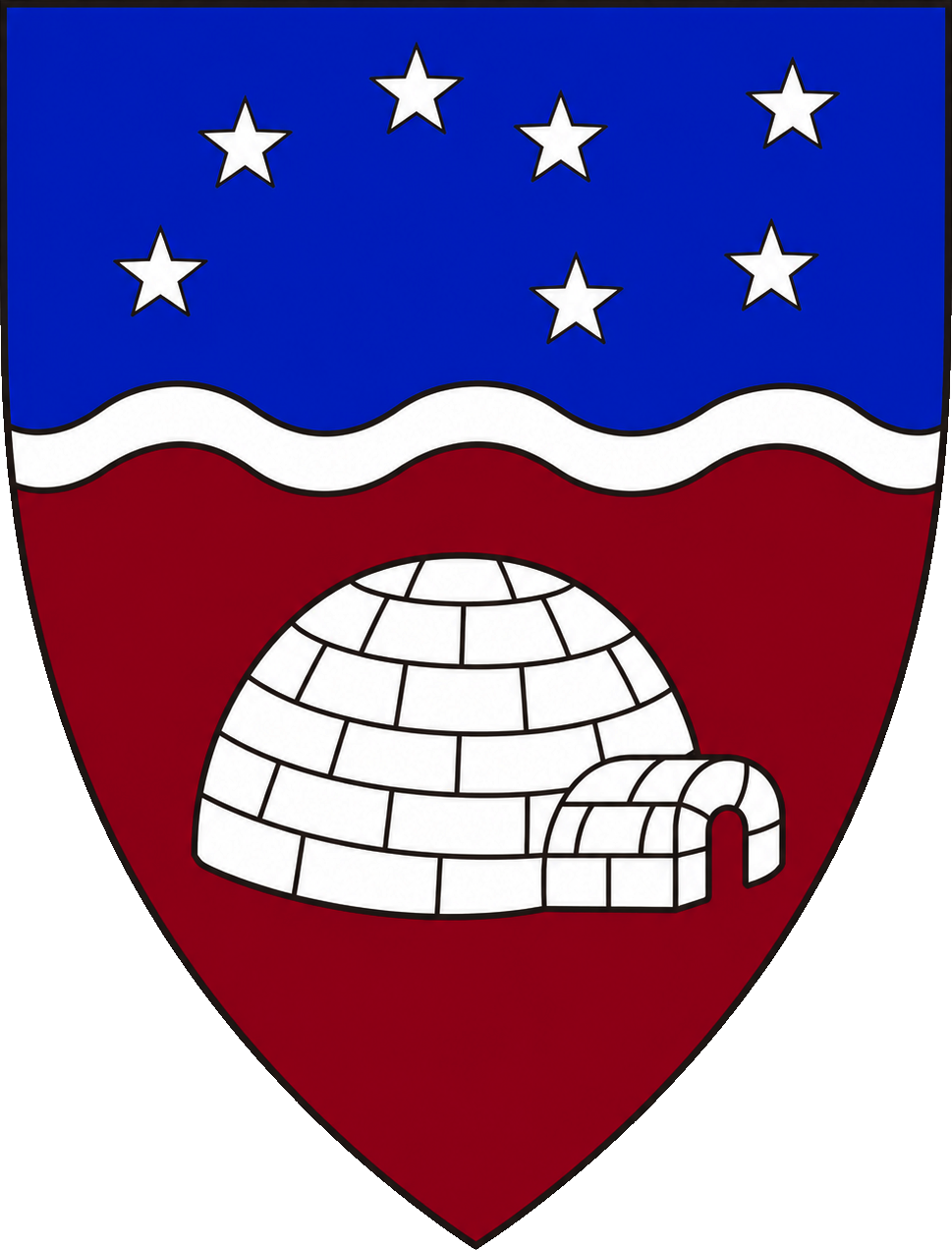

Location
- Ecclesiastical province: Northern Lights
- Coordinates: 63°44′51″N 068°31′00″W

Statistics
- Parishes: 48 (2022)
- Members: 33,889 (2022)

Information
- Rite: Anglican
- Cathedral: St. Jude's Cathedral, Iqaluit
- Secular priests: 16

Current leadership
- Bishop: Alexander Pryor
- Suffragans: Annie Ittoshat, Ann Martha Keenainak, Jared Osborn

Map
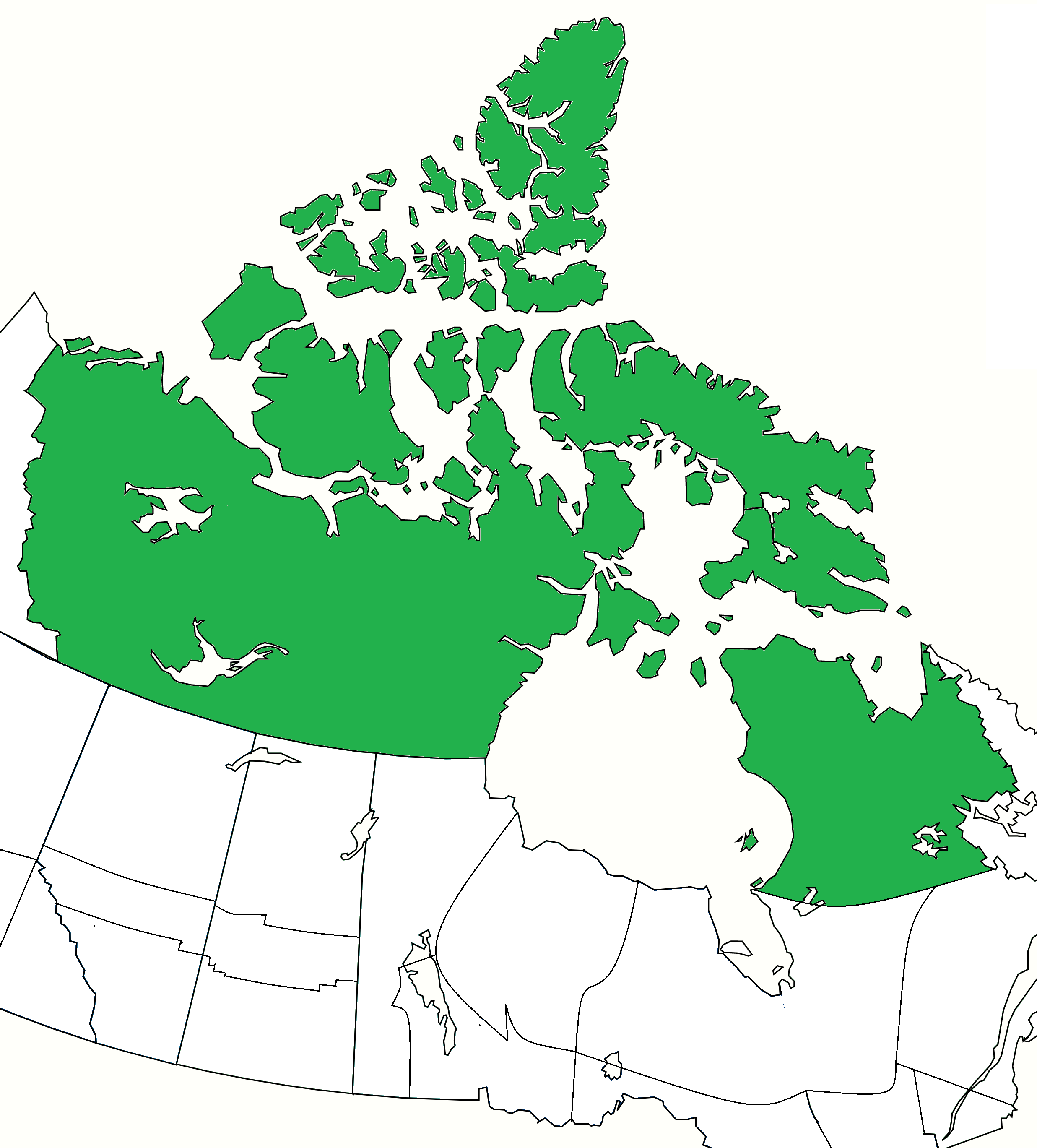
- Location of the Diocese of the Arctic within the Province of the Northern Lights

Website
- www.arcticnet.org

The Diocese of the Arctic is a diocese of the Ecclesiastical Province of the Northern Lights of the Anglican Church of Canada. It is by far the largest of the thirty dioceses in Canada, comprising almost 4,000,000 km^{2} (1,500,000 sq mi), or one-third the land mass of the country. As the name indicates, the diocese encompasses the Arctic region of Canada including the entirety of the Northwest Territories, Nunavut, and the Nunavik region of northern Quebec. The see city is Iqaluit, Nunavut, and the diocese's nearly 34,000 Anglicans (roughly one-third of the total population) are served by 48 parishes. The administrative offices of the diocese are located in Yellowknife, Northwest Territories. Despite the diocese's large numbers of members, it struggles with recruiting and training clergy. Just 16 full-time priests served the far-flung parishes of the diocese in 2025. Parishes without priests are served by retired clergy, deacons, and lay readers, and 10 parishes had no clergy or lay leader present.

The diocese is well known for its igloo-shaped cathedral, St. Jude's, which was destroyed by fire in 2005 but subsequently rebuilt and opened in 2012. It maintains a theological school, the Arthur Turner Training School in Iqaluit. In 1996, Paul Idlout became the first Inuk bishop of the diocese (as suffragan bishop).

== History ==
Originally, the region was part of the vast and sprawling Diocese of Rupert's Land, which at the time encompassed all of present-day Canada west of Ontario. Anglican activity in the Far North primarily took the form of missionary work among the Aboriginal First Nations and Inuit, undertaken for the most part by the evangelical Church Mission Society. In 1874, the Diocese of Rupert's Land was split into four dioceses one of which, Athabasca, included the present-day Diocese of the Arctic. In 1892, Athabasca was subdivided to create the Diocese of Selkirk (coterminous with the Yukon) and the Diocese of Mackenzie River (coterminous with the Northwest Territories).

The Diocese of the Arctic was created from Athabasca in 1933, subsuming the Diocese of Mackenzie River and carving northern Quebec from the Diocese of Quebec, where—like Nunavut and the Northwest Territories—the majority of the population is indigenous. The first constituted synod was not convened, however, until 1972.

In 2002, Andrew Atagotaaluk became the first Inuk diocesan bishop of the diocese and the fifth bishop of the Arctic. Atagotaaluk retired at the end of 2012.

In June 2012, an electoral synod was held. David W. Parsons was elected to succeed as diocesan bishop and Darren McCartney as suffragan.

At the Diocesan Synod held in Yellowknife on 28 March 2019, Joey Royal, Annie Ittoshat and Lucy Netser were elected as suffragan bishops. They were consecrated on 31 March 2019 in Yellowknife, Northwest Territories.

After the Dec. 31, 2024, retirement of Bishop David Parsons, the diocese was headed by an administrator, Suffragan Bishop Annie Ittoshat, until replacement bishops could be elected the following May during a diocesan synod in Edmonton, Alberta. The diocese's archdeacon, Alexander Pryor, was elected diocesan bishop, and two clergy, Ann Martha Keenainak and Jared Osborn, were elected suffragans. Elected at age 37, Pryor is the youngest member of the House of Bishops for the Anglican Church of Canada.

== Theology ==
Both the missionary history of the diocese and its particular cultural context contributes to its theology, which tends towards evangelicalism and conservatism. The strongly evangelical diocese owes its growth to years of basic teachings on behalf of a string of bishops, many of whom were trained by the Church Army, such as the recently retired David Parsons.

== Anglican realignment ==
Bishops David Parsons and Darren McCartney were the only Anglican Church of Canada bishops to attend GAFCON II, held in Nairobi, Kenya, from 21 to 26 October 2013.

On 18 July 2019, the Diocese of the Arctic declared itself in "impaired communion" with dioceses in the Anglican Church of Canada whose bishops have permitted same-sex marriages.

== List of bishops of the Arctic ==
Bishops of the Arctic
From	Until	Incumbent	Notes
1933	1949	Archibald Fleming	
1950	1973	Donald Marsh	Died in office.
1974	1990	John Sperry	
1991	2002	Chris Williams	Elected Suffragan bishop in 1987; Elected coadjutor bishop in 1990.
2002	2012	Andrew Atagotaaluk	First Inuk diocesan bishop. Retired on 31 December 2012.
2012	2024	David W. Parsons	Consecrated coadjutor bishop at New St Jude's Cathedral, Iqaluit on 3 June 2012; Succeeded as diocesan bishop on 1 January 2013.
2025	present	Alexander Pryor	

== List of suffragan bishops ==
Suffragan bishops in the Arctic Diocese
From	Until	Incumbent	Notes
1962	1974	H. G. Cook.	
1980	1987	Jamie C. M. Clarke	Translated to Military Ordinariate of the Canadian Forces.
1987	1991	Chris Williams	Coadjutor bishop from 1990; diocesan bishop, 1991–2002
1996	2004	Paul Idlout	First Inuk to become a bishop.
1999	2002	Andrew Atagotaaluk	Coadjutor bishop from 2002; diocesan bishop, 2002–2012.
1999	2010	Larry Robertson	Translated to Yukon.
2002	2010	Ben Arreak	Was the team coordinator of the Inuktitut translation of the Bible, completed in 2012.
2012	2019	Darren McCartney	Consecrated 3 June 2012 at New St Jude's.
2019	2024	Joey Royal	Director of the Arthur Turner Training School.
2019	present	Annie Ittoshat	Previously ministered in the Diocese of Montreal.
2019	2025	Lucy Netser	
2025	present	Ann Martha Keenainak	
2025	present	Jared Osborn	
