= Pangnirtung Airport =

Airport in Nunavut, Canada

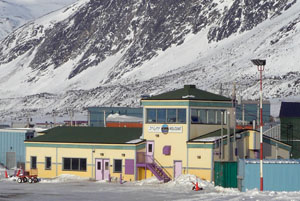
- IATA: YXP; ICAO: CYXP; WMO: 71826

Summary
- Airport type: Public
- Operator: Government of Nunavut
- Location: Pangnirtung, Nunavut
- Time zone: EST (UTC−05:00)
  - Summer (DST): EDT (UTC−04:00)
- Elevation AMSL: 79 ft / 24 m
- Coordinates: 66°08′42″N 065°42′49″W

Map
- Location in Nunavut CYXP (Canada)

Runways
Direction	Length		Surface
Direction	ft	m	Surface
06/24	2,920	890	Gravel

Statistics (2010)
- Aircraft movements: 2,049
- Sources: Canada Flight Supplement; Environment Canada; Movements from Statistics Canada.

Pangnirtung Airport (IATA: YXP, ICAO: CYXP) is located at Pangnirtung, Nunavut, Canada, and is operated by the Government of Nunavut.

In December 2005 the Government of Nunavut announced that they would spend $34.6 million to build a new airport.

== Airlines and destinations ==
Airlines	Destinations
Canadian North	Iqaluit, Qikiqtarjuaq

== Gallery ==
Pangnirtung Airport
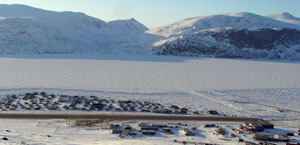
Pangnirtung airstrip, April 2006

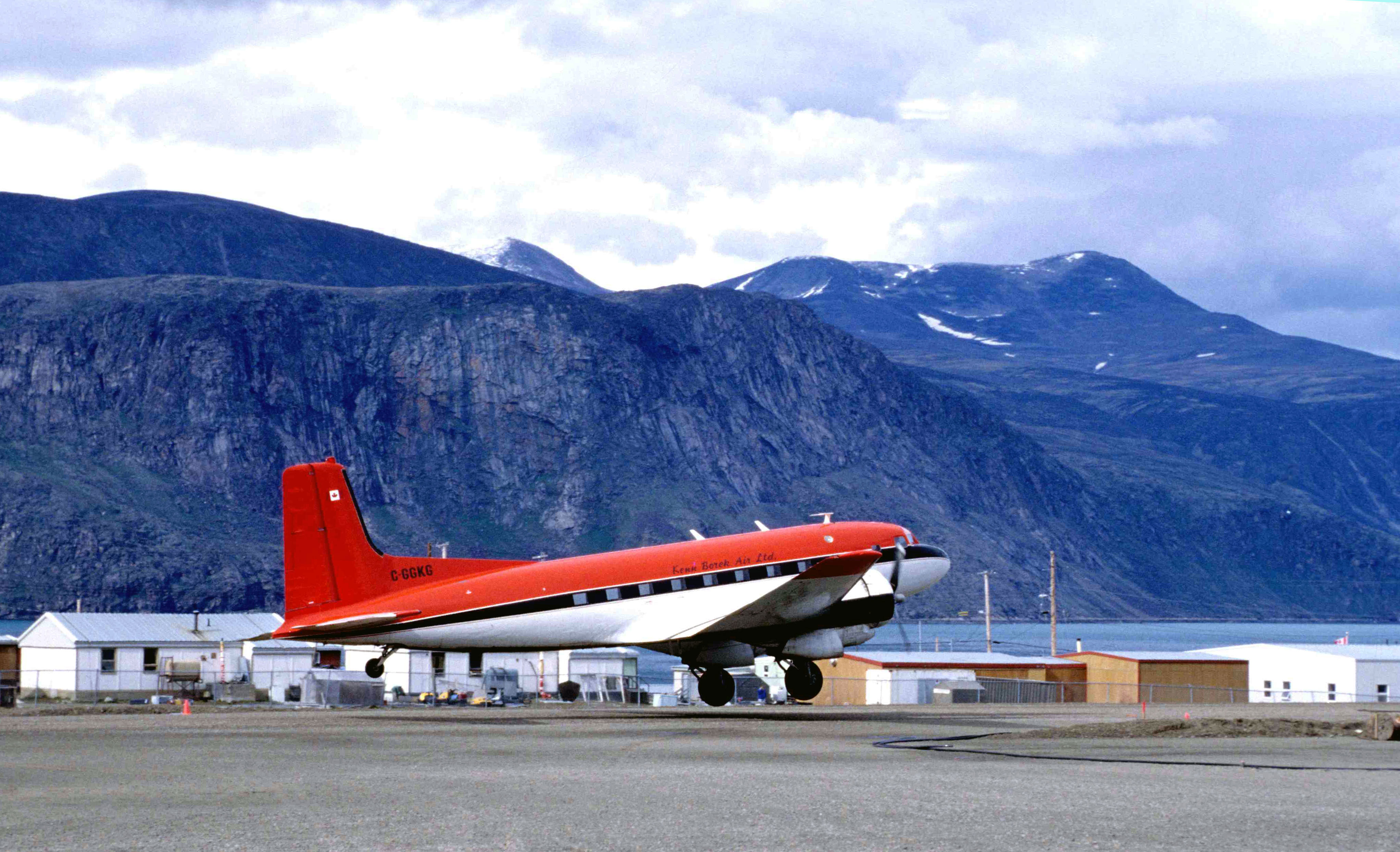
Douglas Super DC-3, taking off from Pangnirtung Airport

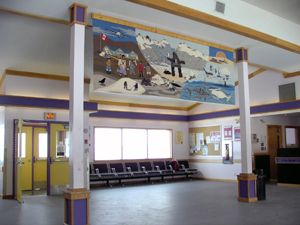
Interior of the terminal, showing the tapestry woven for the opening of the airport terminal, April 2006

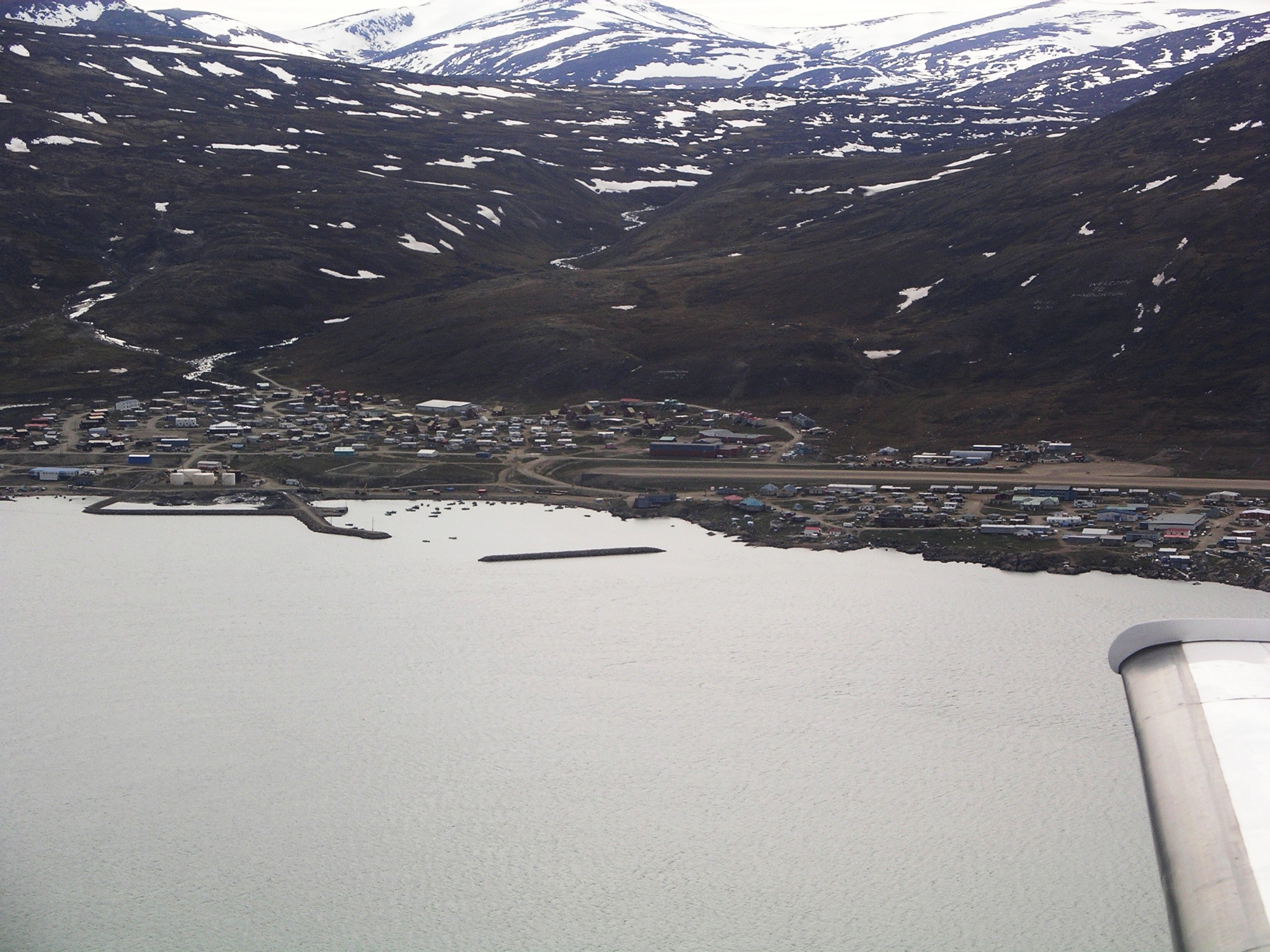
Abeam the Pangnirtung Airport

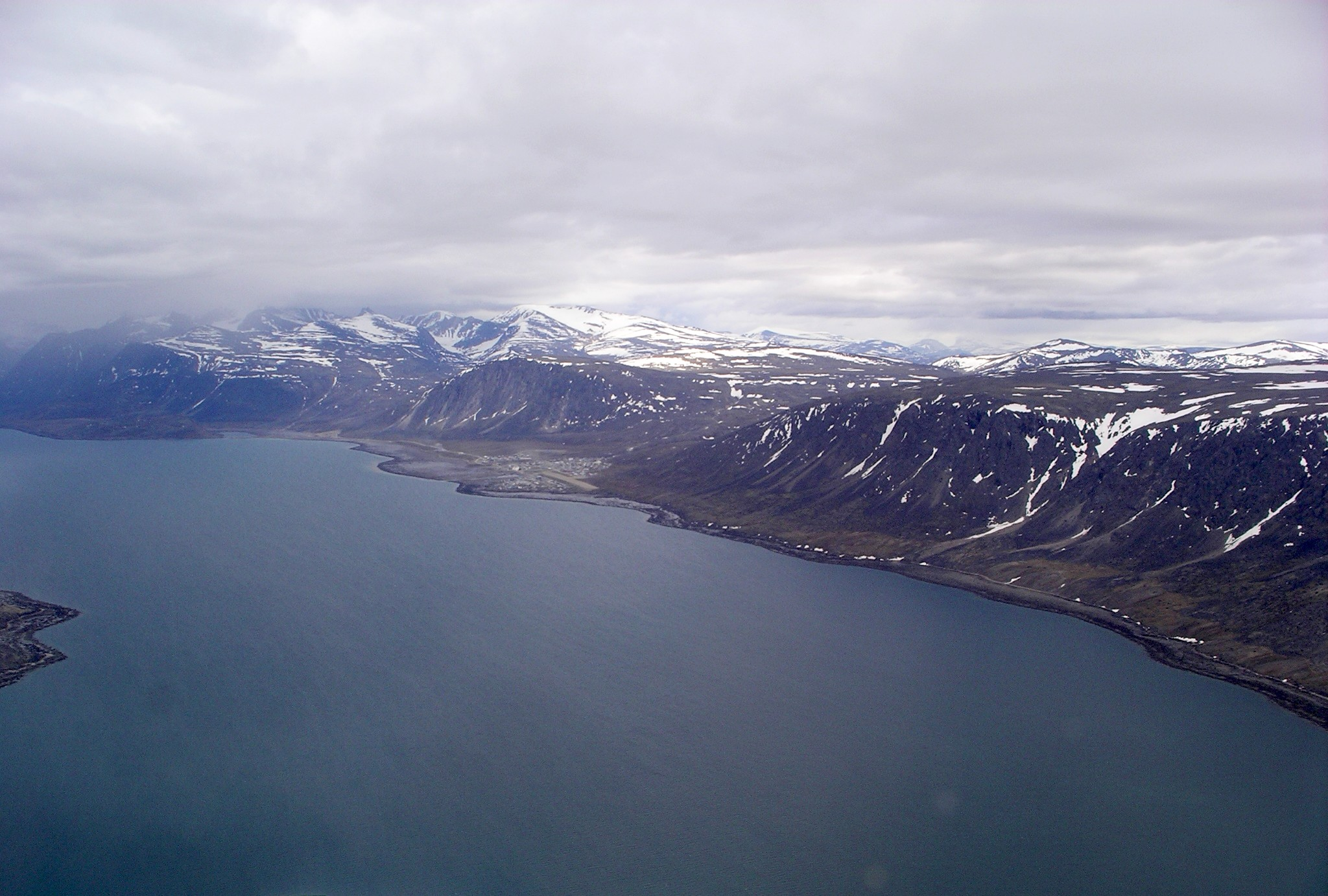
The town and airport snuggled in beside the mountains

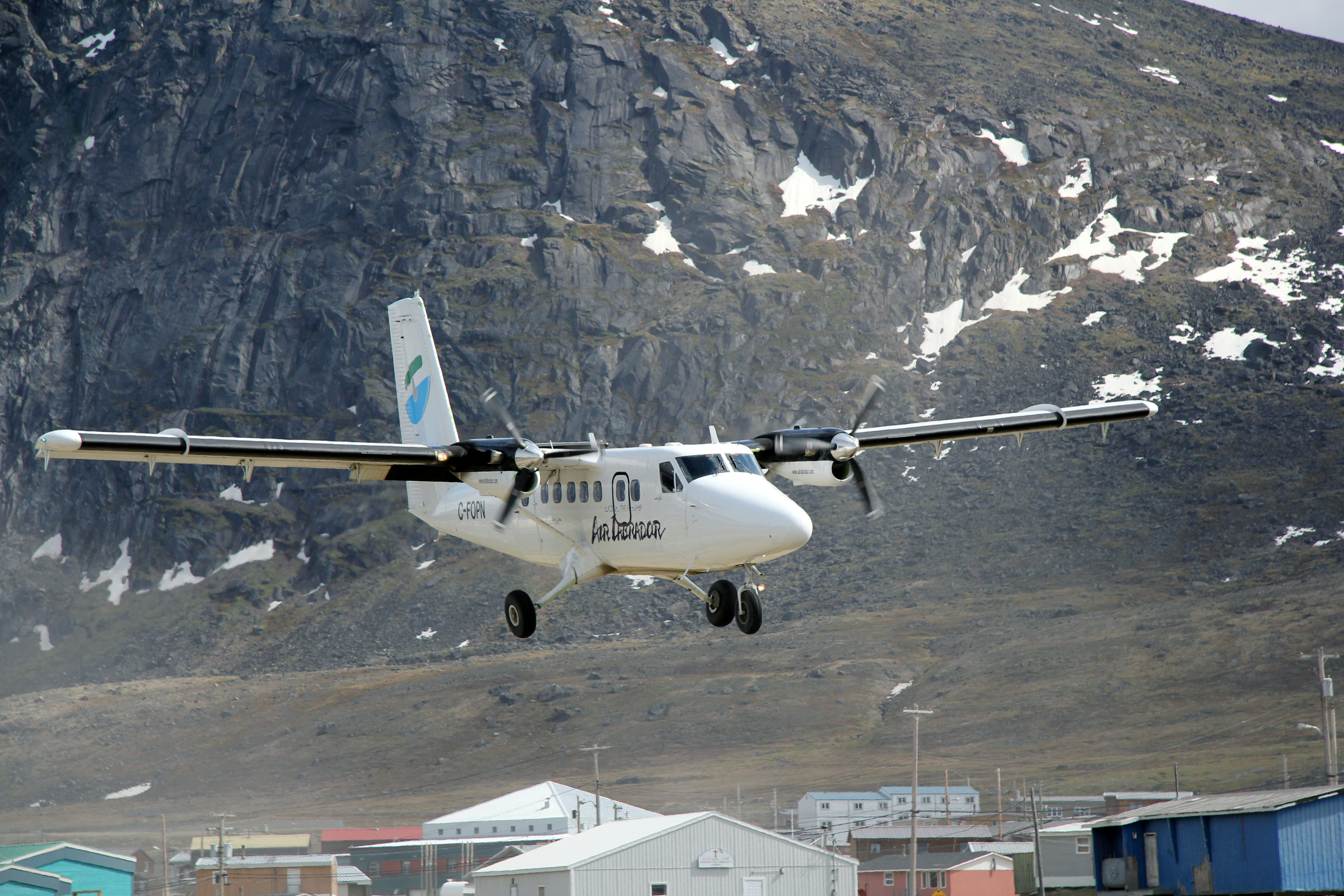
Air Labrador de Havilland Canada DHC-6 Twin Otter on short final for runway 24
