= Lucy Netser =

Inuk Canadian Anglican bishop

The Right Reverend Lucy Netser
- Bishop Suffragan of the Diocese of the Arctic
- Church: Anglican Church of Canada
- Diocese: Arctic
- In office: 2019–2025
- Other posts: Lead pastor, St. Mark's Church, Coral Harbour

Orders
- Ordination: 2006 (diaconate)
- Consecration: March 31, 2019 by Michael Hawkins

Lucy Netser is an Inuk Canadian Anglican bishop. From 2019 to 2025, she was one of three suffragan bishops of the Diocese of the Arctic in the Anglican Church of Canada (ACC). Alongside Annie Ittoshat, who was elected and consecrated at the same time, she is the first female Inuk bishop in the world.

== Early life and career ==
Netser grew up in Pangnirtung as the daughter of a minister. Going through frequent moves as a child, she did not want to enter ministry herself. Netser married, had children and worked as an economic development officer in Nunavut. During this time, she was also an Anglican laywoman active in the Woman's Auxiliary or Anglican Church Women of Canada. Around age 40, she was called to ministry and studied at the Diocese of the Arctic's Arthur Turner Training School, after which she entered non-stipendiary ministry.

== Ordained ministry ==
Prior to her election as bishop, Netser was lead pastor at St. Francis’ Church in Arviat, Nunavut, and the regional dean for the Kivalliq deanery. She later moved to Coral Harbour, where she serves simultaneously as lead pastor of the local church.

At the Diocese of the Arctic's triennial synod in Yellowknife in March 2019, Netser was elected and consecrated a suffragan bishop alongside Joey Royal and Annie Ittoshat. Due to the high costs and difficulty of travel in the diocese, bishops from the Rupert's Land were on hand to confirm the election and consecrate the new bishops on March 31. Netser's primary episcopal responsibilities were parishes in Kivalliq (mainland Nunavut).

Like other Arctic bishops, Netser has opposed theologically liberal trends in the ACC. As a bishop, she voted against the proposed 2019 change to the church's marriage doctrine, and the measure failed to secure the necessary majority among the church's bishops during the vote at General Synod. Netser noted that "[i]f there are some changes made that are different from our beliefs in the north, it would affect our Inuit tremendously." In 2023, alongside the other Arctic bishops, Netser objected to the ACC's approval of gender transition liturgies and said they would not be authorized in the diocese.
