= John Sperry =

Canadian Anglican bishop (1924–2012)

The Right Reverend John Sperry CM D.D.
- Bishop of The Arctic
- Church: Anglican Church of Canada
- Diocese: Arctic
- In office: 1974–1990
- Predecessor: Donald Marsh
- Successor: Chris Williams

Personal details
- Born: 2 May 1924 Leicester, Leicestershire, United Kingdom
- Died: 11 February 2012 (aged 87) Hay River, Northwest Territories, Canada

John Reginald Sperry CM (2 May 1924 – 11 February 2012) was Bishop of The Arctic from 1974 to 1990.

Born on 2 May 1924, educated at King's College, Halifax, and ordained in 1951, he began his career at St Andrew's Mission in the Northwest Territories. Later, he was a canon at All Saints’ Cathedral, Aklavik and then Archdeacon of Coppermine now Kugluktuk. From 1969 to 1973, he was Rector of Fort Smith when he was elevated to the episcopate. He served as a Canadian Rangers officer.

Anglican Communion titles
Preceded by Donald Marsh	Bishop of The Arctic; 1974–1990	Succeeded by Chris Williams
