= Donald Marsh =

Canadian Anglican bishop (1903–1973)

Donald Ben Marsh (24 November 1903 – 5 February 1973) was Bishop of The Arctic from 1950 to 1973.

Educated at the University of Saskatchewan and ordained in 1929, he began his career as a missionary at Eskimo Point. Later he was the incumbent at All Saints Cathedral, Aklavik then Archdeacon of Baffin Land. He was the second Bishop of The Arctic and became at some point a Doctor of Divinity (DD).

Anglican Communion titles
Preceded by Archibald Fleming	Bishop of The Arctic; 1950–1973	Succeeded by John Sperry
