= Darren McCartney =

Irish-born Anglican bishop

The Right Reverend Darren McCartney
- Bishop Suffragan of the Diocese of the Arctic
- Church: Anglican Church of Canada
- Diocese: Arctic
- In office: 2012–2019
- Other posts: Rector, St. Paul's, Lisburn (2023–present)

Orders
- Consecration: June 3, 2012

Personal details
- Born: 1973 or 1974 (age 51–52)

Darren McCartney (born 1973 or 1974) is an Irish Anglican bishop. He was the suffragan bishop of the Arctic in the Anglican Church of Canada from 2012 to 2019, after which he returned to Ireland to serve in parochial ministry.

McCartney was ordained in 2004 and began his career as priest in charge of Pangnirtung. He also served in Carrickfergus and Knocknamuckley before his ordination to the episcopate.
