= Simeonie Keenainak =

Inuk accordionist and retired RCMP officer

- Born: 1948 (age 76–77); 60 kilometres north of Pangnirtung
- Known for: Inuit accordion music
- Spouse: Daisy Keenainak (m. 1967)
- Children: 5 (including Ann Martha Keenainak)

Simeonie Keenainak (born 1948) is an Inuk accordionist and retired RCMP officer from Pangnirtung, Nunavut, Canada. He is also a photographer, teacher and hunter. He has performed at the Pangnirtung Music Festival and was featured in regional and national media for his musicianship and cultural community efforts.

== Early life ==
Keenainak was born about 60 kilometres north of Pangnirtung. Growing up, he learned traditional hunting skills.

== Career ==
Keenainak began acting as a guide for the RCMP, and later became a constable. He also performed around the north on the accordion; in 1996 he participated in the CBC's Inuit Button Accordion Festival.

After retiring from the police force, Keenainak worked as a high school shop teacher, began teaching traditional skills to young people, and became involved in nature photography. He continued to hunt and to play on the accordion, including a 2012 performance with the National Arts Centre Orchestra.

A 2012 short documentary about Inuit music, Inngiruti – The Thing that Sings!, in which Keenainak performs and is interviewed, was filmed by Nyla Innuksuk through the National Film Board.

In 2019 he represented the local hunters' association at hearings about oil and gas development in the arctic.

== Personal ==
Simeonie and Daisy Keenainak have been married since 1967.
