= Uqqurmiut Centre for Arts & Crafts =

Arts centre

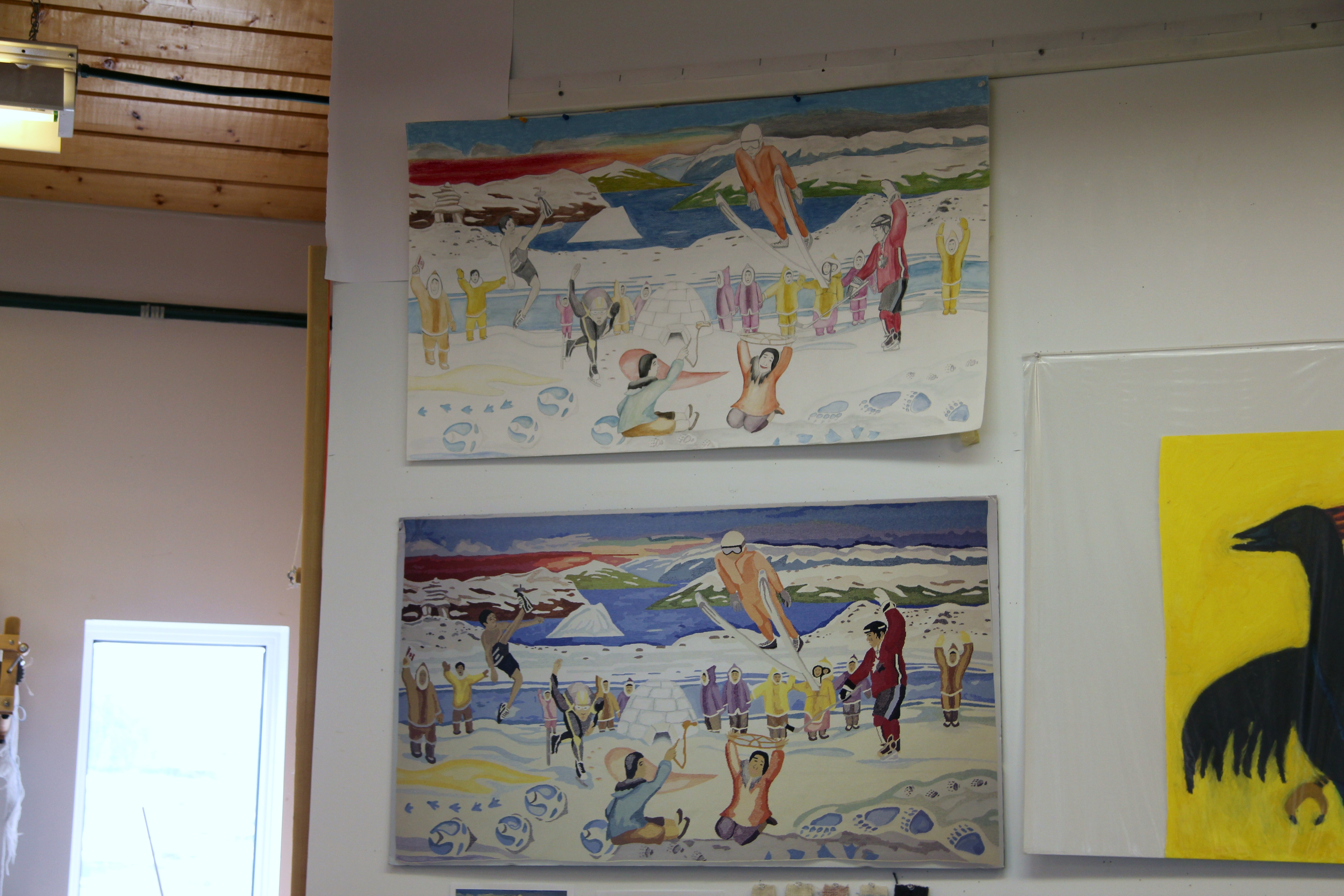
- Tapestries at the Uqqurmiut Centre for Arts & Crafts

- Location within Nunavut Location within Canada
- Former names: Pangnirtung Tapestry Studio (1991); Craft Gallery (1991); Pangnirtung Print Shop (1994)

General information
- Type: Arts and crafts centre prints tapestry wallhangings
- Location: Pangnirtung, Nunavut
- Coordinates: 66°08′49″N 065°42′31″W

Website
- http://www.uqqurmiut.ca/

Uqqurmiut Centre for Arts & Crafts is an arts centre that was established by the Uqqurmiut Inuit Artists Association in 1990, in Pangnirtung, in the Qikiqtaaluk Region of Nunavut, Canada. The Centre includes a Tapestry Studio, a Craft Gallery, and a Print Shop. In spite of its remote location and small population, numerous Inuit from Pangnirtung have successfully marketed their prints, carvings, sculptures, and textile arts, such as woven wall hangings, to southern collectors. Starting in the 1970s, limited edition prints from the original Print Shop were published annually as the Pangnirtung Prints Collection through the then-Eskimo Co-operative. In 1970 a weaving studio was established and over time the tapestries attracted an international market.

The centre's architecture echos the circular shapes of igloos and skin tents from traditional Inuit settlements.

In 2002 a major exhibition entitled, Nuvisavik: the place where we weave was shown at the Canadian Museum of Civilization (now known as the Canadian Museum of History) in Ottawa, Canada. The exhibition catalogue was edited by Maria Von Finckenstein, the curator of Inuit art at the museum.

== Uqqurmiut Inuit Artists Association ==
The fully Inuit-owned and run organization, The Uqqurmiut Inuit Artists Association, which was incorporated in 1988, is the major shareholder in The Uqqurmiut Centre for Arts & Craft. In 1999, Nunavut Development Corporation owned 51-per-cent interest in the Uqqurmiut Centre. The development corporation, which invests in Nunavut's economy by creating jobs and opportunities for Nunavut residents in small hamlets, is a territorial corporation of the Government of Nunavut corporation, enabled by the Nunavut Development Corporation Act.

Uqqurmiut means "the people of the leeside" in Inuktitut. Pangnirtung is at the edge of Pangnirtung Fjord, a fjord near Cumberland Sound on the lee side of a mountain.

== Architecture ==
The newer buildings that replaced both the weave and print studios, are interconnected to echo the design of large igloos. They resemble "traditional circular tents of old Inuit settlements" and the interconnected nature of large igloos.

== Pangnirtung print shop ==
The 2,300 sq ft (210 m^{2}) print shop, which was completed in 1994, replaced the original print shop which burned to the ground in 1993. Starting in the 1970s, limited edition prints from the original print shop were published annually as the Pangnirtung Prints Collection through the then-Eskimo Co-operative. When the Uqqurmiut Inuit Artists Association released their 1999 collection of 22 catalogued prints, displays were held in "23 galleries throughout North America".

== Pangnirtung Tapestry Studio ==
The 2,100 sq ft (200 m^{2}) Pangnirtung Tapestry Studio was completed in 1990.

== Craft Gallery ==
The 1,400 sq ft (130 m^{2}) Craft Gallery promotes Inuit art and culture.

== Artists ==
Elisapee Ishulutaq, who was born at Kanirterjuak, on the east side of Cumberland Sound, Baffin Island in 1925, started her artistic career when she was in her forties. The stories that are referred to in her artwork originate from her childhood in the 1920s and early 1930s when she lived in small, remote hunting and fishing camps following the traditional semi-nomadic life of the Uqqurmiut Inuit. Ishulutaq moved to Pangnirtung at about the same time that the Print Shop had opened. She was gifted in carving and drawing and became part of the first wave of artists there who contributed to the annual Print Collection. In 1973, the California College of Arts and Crafts for a print gave her an award of merit for one of her prints. By 2012, her tapestries and prints were in prominent public museums, such as the National Gallery of Canada, Ottawa, Montreal Museum of Fine Arts, the Canadian Museum of Civilization, and the Art Gallery of Ontario.

Andrew Qappik is known for the large tapestry entitled "Our ancestors' land is our land now", which is displayed at the Visitors' Centre in Iqaluit, the capital of Nunavut. He designed the flag of Nunavut. John Houston, who was the print shop's technical arts advisor in 1975, remembered how eleven-year-old Qappik used to watch his uncles Solomon and Imoona Karpik, who were printmakers, as they worked in their shop. In 1978, a retired University of North Carolina history professor, H.G. Jones, noticed 14-year-old Qappik's work. As a historian, he became intrigued with Qappik's depictions of Inuit life in the past. By 1999, Jones had collected all 69 limited edition prints produced by Qappik. Jones, who first visited Pangnirtung Fiord in 1972, was attracted to Pang's Arctic landscape. By 2015, Jones had made almost 31 annual visits to Pangnirtung and had purchased every one of Andrews's prints—etchings, stone cuts, lithographs, and linocuts." In 2006, Jones donated his collection of "140 of Qappik’s catalogued and uncatalogued prints" to the Winnipeg Art Gallery (WAG), which has the world's largest Inuit art collection. Qappik's first solo exhibition was held at the WAG in 2010 and featured these prints. His 2003 drypoint print is a self-portrait of him working at the press in the Uqqurmiut Centre for Arts & Crafts Print Shop.
