= Anglican Journal =

Canadian periodical

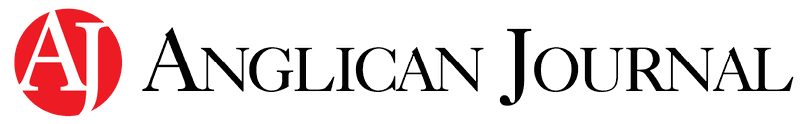

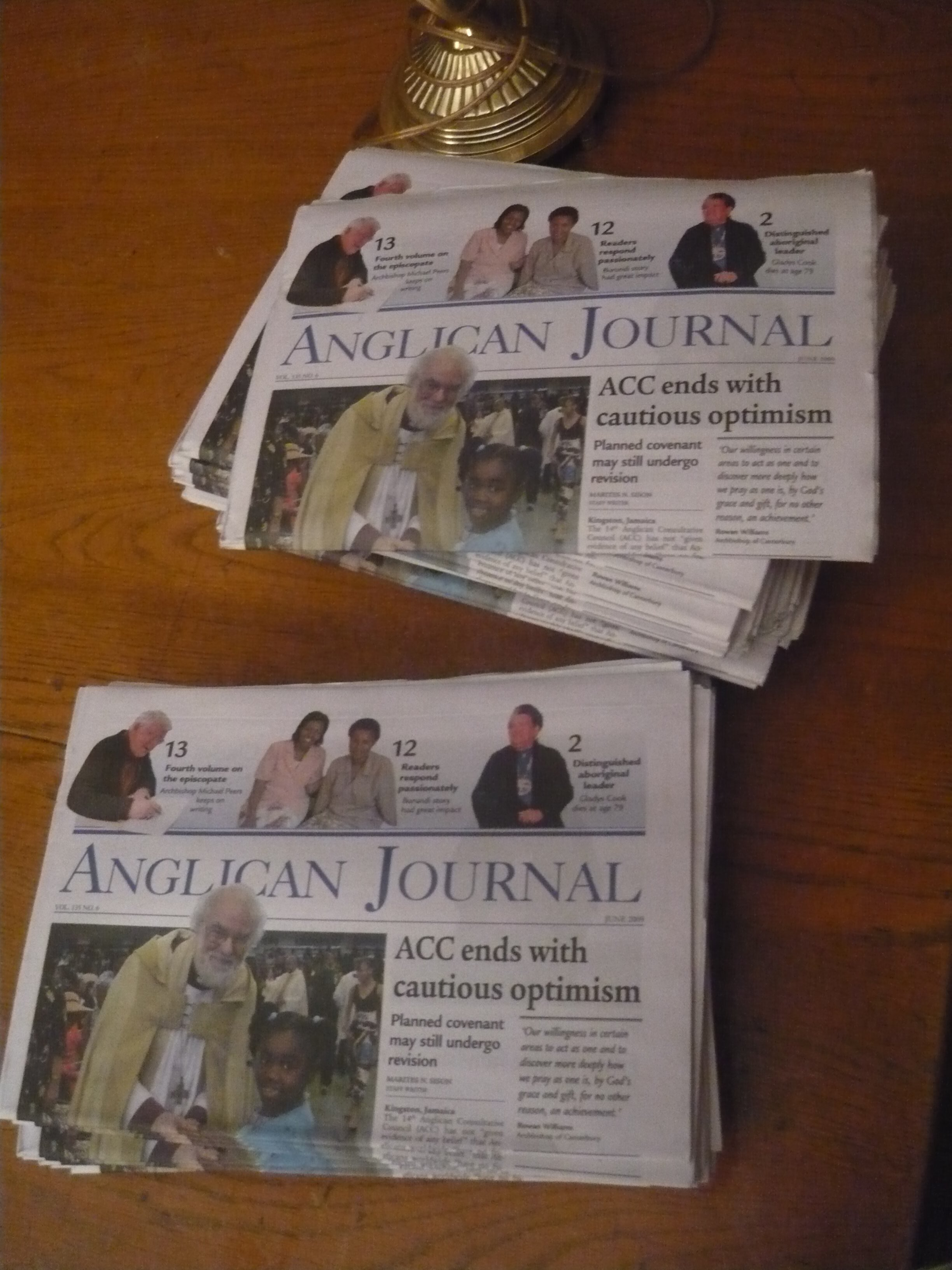
- Print copies of Anglican Journal
- Type: House organ
- Format: Print, online
- Owner: Anglican Church of Canada
- Founded: 1875; 151 years ago
- Language: English
- City: Toronto, Ontario
- Country: Canada
- Circulation: 34,570 (as of December 2025)
- ISSN: 0847-978X
- Website: anglicanjournal.com

The Anglican Journal is the national newspaper of the Anglican Church of Canada (ACC). Founded in 1875, it was independently owned until 1948, when it became an official publication of the church. In addition to online news coverage, the newspaper is published 10 times per year and is also distributed alongside several diocesan newspapers, allowing the smaller papers to save funds on postage. Even after coming under the ACC, the Journal continued to operate with a rare degree of editorial independence, publishing journalism on controversial topics in Canada and winning numerous journalism awards. However, in 2026, the ACC changed the Journal's mandate to serve as a communications outlet for the national church.

== History ==
The paper was founded in 1875 as an independently owned Anglican newspaper called the Dominion Churchman. It was renamed the Canadian Churchman from 1890 until taking its present name in 1989. The original owner was an English bookkeeper named Frank Wootten. After Wootten's death in 1912, the paper was owned for a decade by a group of evangelical Anglican churchmen and associated with Wycliffe College, Toronto. The paper remained under private ownership until 1948, when it was taken over by the ACC's General Board of Religious Education. In 1959, the paper absorbed the ACC's other publications and began to be distributed with diocesan newspapers, reaching a circulation of 200,000.

During the late 1960s and early 1970s, the paper hired experienced journalists and professional reporters instead of relying on clergy authors and began publishing stories on controversial issues such as poverty, pollution, First Nations land claims, abortion and apartheid. It adopted a policy of journalistic independence in 1977, an unusual posture among church-sponsored publications. However, this posture occasionally created tensions with the national church office. Amid growing concerns about litigation over Anglican residential school abuses in Canada, the Journal became a separately incorporated entity in 2002. This was intended to protect it from a potential bankruptcy by the national church. The paper had as many as 230,000 subscribers in 2004. The paper was redesigned in 2010 and launched a new website that year.

The Journal has been frequently cited for excellence in journalism, winning, for example, 17 awards from the Associated Church Press and 16 from the Canadian Church Press in 2016—the most in its history. However, the newspaper also experienced continued conflict with the national leadership of the ACC over how much independence the Journal would be permitted, and the church leadership would routinely review drafts of controversial articles or stories with potential legal risk.

In 2021, for instance, the Journal prepared reporting on allegations of sexual misconduct and abuse made as part of the ACCToo movement. As part of this reporting, the Journal promised confidentiality and anonymity to survivors interviewed by the paper. Senior ACC officials requested a draft copy, and the church's then–general secretary Alan Perry shared the draft with bishops overseeing institutions that were implicated in the abuse allegations. There were calls for Perry to resign over the matter. ACC Primate Linda Nicholls, who had also received a draft of the story, said it had been shared with the bishops for fact-checking purposes; after a third-party inquiry into the matter, Nicholls apologized for the "breach of trust" and for "retraumatization" of the survivors. The editor of the paper at that time—the paper's 13th editor in 22 years—resigned in protest. The church's Council of General Synod (CoGS), the executive body of the ACC, issued an apology for harm done to survivors who had been interviewed for the story.

In the mid-2020s, the ACC began evaluating the Journal in the context of the church's broader decline. In 2025, the CoGS approved a recommendation to continue the Anglican Journal's journalistic mandate—as an alternative to eliminating it, eliminating the print edition or making it a corporate communications organ for the church—for another three-year period and then evaluate future changes. In June 2026, CoGS voted to end the independent journalistic posture of the Journal and to make the Journal "the voice of the Anglican Church of Canada and part of its larger communications strategy rather than a separate journalistic enterprise," ensuring that its content "unequivocally supports the mission of the church."

== Operations ==
To save on postage, the Journal is packaged with diocesan newsletters from 15 of the ACC's 30 dioceses. Since 1994, the Journal has raised funds directly from readers and shares half of the funds raised by the appeal with the diocesan newspapers. As of 2026, the Anglican Journal operated with an approximately CA$500,000 deficit. The paper also relies on a grant from the Canada Periodical Fund (CA$157,099 in 2025–26) for community newspapers; that grant was conditional on maintaining an editorial function and publications "mainly produced to report on the activities or promote the interests of an organizations" are ineligible. The paper is affiliated with the Associated Church Press and the Canadian Church Press and is published 10 times per year, every month except for July and August.

From 2019 to 2020, the Journal published a short-lived quarterly digital journal called Epiphanies. The publication focused on "in-depth stories and diverse perspectives on complex subjects."
