= Pangnirtung =

Pangnirtung Panniqtuuq ᐸᖕᓂᖅᑑᖅ
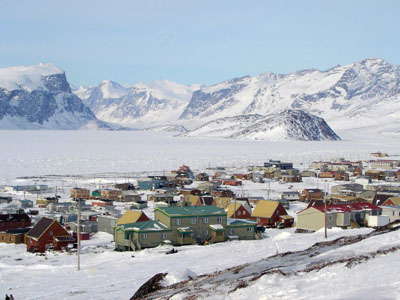
- "Uptown" neighbourhood of Pangnirtung. April 2006

- Seal
- Nicknames: "Pang", "Switzerland of the Arctic"
- Location within Nunavut Location within Canada
- Coordinates: 66°08′40″N 065°42′55″W
- Country: Canada
- Territory: Nunavut
- Region: Qikiqtaaluk
- Electoral district: Pangnirtung

Government
  - Type: Hamlet Council
  - Mayor: Stevie Komoartok
  - MLA: Johnny Mike

Area (2021)
  - Land: 7.98 km^{2} (3.08 sq mi)
- Elevation: 23 m (75 ft)

Population (2021)
  - Total: 1,504
  - Density: 190.6/km^{2} (494/sq mi)
- Time zone: UTC−05:00 (EST)
  - Summer (DST): UTC−04:00 (EDT)
- Canadian Postal code: X0A 0R0
- Area code: 867
- Website: www.pangnirtung.ca

Pangnirtung (or Pang, also Pangniqtuuq, in syllabics: ᐸᖕᓂᖅᑑᖅ [paŋniqtuːq]) is an Inuit hamlet in the Qikiqtaaluk Region of the Canadian territory of Nunavut, located on Baffin Island. The community is located about 45 km (28 mi) south of the Arctic Circle, and about 2,700 km (1,700 mi) from the North Pole. Pangnirtung is situated on a coastal plain at the coast of Pangnirtung Fjord, a fjord which eventually merges with Cumberland Sound. As of October 2024, the mayor is Stevie Komoartok.

== Name ==
There is some confusion about the village name. Residents say the real name is Pangniqtuuq, which means "the place of many bull caribou". Early in 2005 residents voted against officially changing the name of the village to the native one, as Pangnirtung has achieved an international reputation. Its residents have created high-quality traditional arts in sculpture, as well as adaptation of themes and design in printmaking and weaving.

Pangnirtung is nicknamed the Switzerland of the Arctic, or simply Pang.

== History ==
The Inuit and their ancestors, Paleo-Eskimo, have inhabited the area for thousands of years, perhaps up to 4000 years. Their cultures became well-adapted to the harsh climate and environment.

In 1921, the Hudson's Bay Company established a trading post in Pangnirtung. Two years later, the Royal Canadian Mounted Police erected a permanent office. The first government-appointed teacher arrived in 1956. The first administrative office was established in 1962.

Since then, numerous Inuit have achieved success with marketing their traditional arts. They transformed traditional drawing skills to produce lithographs and other forms of prints, allowing reproduction and wider distribution of their work. Other artists have made sculptures and carvings in local stone. Since the government established a weaving studio in 1970, many Inuit have learned to weave and are producing tapestries and other works that find an international market.

== Demographics ==
Federal census population history of Pangnirtung
Year	Pop.	±%
1971	685	—
1976	807	+17.8%
1981	839	+4.0%
1986	1,004	+19.7%
1991	1,135	+13.0%
1996	1,243	+9.5%
2001	1,276	+2.7%
2006	1,325	+3.8%
2011	1,425	+7.5%
2016	1,481	+3.9%
2021	1,504	+1.6%
Source: Statistics Canada

In the 2021 Canadian census conducted by Statistics Canada, Pangnirtung had a population of 1,504 living in 396 of its 456 total private dwellings, a change of 1.6% from its 2016 population of 1,481. With a land area of 7.98 km^{2} (3.08 sq mi), it had a population density of 188.5/km^{2} (488.1/sq mi) in 2021.

Panethnic groups in Pangnirtung (2001−2021)
Panethnic group	2021		2016		2006		2001	
Panethnic group	Pop.	%	Pop.	%	Pop.	%	Pop.	%
Indigenous	1,415	94.33%	1,395	94.26%	1,240	93.58%	1,210	94.53%
European (Note: Statistic includes all persons that did not make up part of a visible minority or an indigenous identity.)	85	5.67%	70	4.73%	65	4.91%	65	5.08%
African	0	0%	10	0.68%	0	0%	0	0%
Middle Eastern (Note: Statistic includes total responses of "West Asian" and "Arab" under visible minority section on census.)	0	0%	10	0.68%	0	0%	0	0%
East Asian (Note: Statistic includes total responses of "Chinese", "Korean", and "Japanese" under visible minority section on census.)	0	0%	0	0%	20	1.51%	0	0%
South Asian	0	0%	0	0%	10	0.75%	0	0%
Southeast Asian (Note: Statistic includes total responses of "Filipino" and "Southeast Asian" under visible minority section on census.)	0	0%	0	0%	0	0%	0	0%
Latin American	0	0%	0	0%	0	0%	0	0%
Other/multiracial (Note: Statistic includes total responses of "Visible minority, n.i.e." and "Multiple visible minorities" under visible minority section on census.)	0	0%	0	0%	0	0%	0	0%
Total responses	1,500	99.73%	1,480	99.93%	1,325	100%	1,280	100.31%
Total population	1,504	100%	1,481	100%	1,325	100%	1,276	100%
Note: Totals greater than 100% due to multiple origin responses

== Geography and climate ==
Pangnirtung has a tundra climate (Köppen: ET; Trewartha: Ftkd) with very short, cool summers and long, cold winters lasting almost the entire year.

Climate data for Pangnirtung WMO ID: 71826; Climate ID: 2403049; coordinates 66°08′36.3″N 65°42′40.5″W; elevation: 22.6 m (74 ft); 1991–2020 normals, extremes 1995–present
Month	Jan	Feb	Mar	Apr	May	Jun	Jul	Aug	Sep	Oct	Nov	Dec	Year
Record high humidex	5.9	8.6	6.0	9.9	—	20.2	23.3	25.3	14.8	11.1	8.8	6.6	25.3
Record high °C (°F)	6.8 (44.2)	5.0 (41.0)	7.1 (44.8)	10.2 (50.4)	11.5 (52.7)	20.4 (68.7)	24.2 (75.6)	23.8 (74.8)	15.5 (59.9)	11.5 (52.7)	7.0 (44.6)	7.8 (46.0)	24.2 (75.6)
Mean daily maximum °C (°F)	−21.1 (−6.0)	−21.8 (−7.2)	−17.2 (1.0)	−8.6 (16.5)	0.3 (32.5)	7.1 (44.8)	11.9 (53.4)	11.1 (52.0)	5.6 (42.1)	−0.9 (30.4)	−6.9 (19.6)	−13.6 (7.5)	−4.5 (23.9)
Daily mean °C (°F)	−24.5 (−12.1)	−25.1 (−13.2)	−21.0 (−5.8)	−12.6 (9.3)	−2.5 (27.5)	4.1 (39.4)	8.6 (47.5)	8.2 (46.8)	3.3 (37.9)	−3.2 (26.2)	−9.6 (14.7)	−16.6 (2.1)	−7.6 (18.3)
Mean daily minimum °C (°F)	−27.7 (−17.9)	−28.3 (−18.9)	−24.3 (−11.7)	−16.6 (2.1)	−5.5 (22.1)	1.1 (34.0)	5.2 (41.4)	5.1 (41.2)	0.9 (33.6)	−5.4 (22.3)	−12.1 (10.2)	−19.5 (−3.1)	−10.6 (12.9)
Record low °C (°F)	−38.5 (−37.3)	−41.6 (−42.9)	−40.0 (−40.0)	−34.5 (−30.1)	−24.0 (−11.2)	−5.2 (22.6)	−2.0 (28.4)	−2.4 (27.7)	−8.0 (17.6)	−16.5 (2.3)	−27.7 (−17.9)	−39.5 (−39.1)	−41.6 (−42.9)
Record low wind chill	−55.1	−53.6	−53.6	−41.4	−33.1	−11.3	−6.5	−6.4	−14.9	−26.8	−37.6	−49.5	−55.1
Average relative humidity (%) (at 1500 LST)	74.1	—	77.9	81.1	77.8	59.4	53.9	63.6	74.6	86.0	82.4	76.9	—
Source: Environment and Climate Change Canada Canadian Climate Normals 1991–2020

== Economic development ==
The community operates a turbot fishery. In 2008, the federal government budgeted for the construction of a harbour. Pangnirtung Fisheries Limited operates a packing plant to process local turbot catches. Founded in 1992 during peak summer operations the company has over 40 employees during peak season.

Auyuittuq Lodge is the hamlet's only hotel, which comprises 25 rooms, shared facilities, a dining room, and a lounge.

== Local services ==
Power is supplied to Pangnirtung via standalone diesel generators operated by Qulliq Energy.

Fuel is imported via tanker and stored in a tank farm near the Pangnirtung Airport. The purchase of diesel fuel is the responsibility of the government of Nunavut.

Water, sewage, and garbage services are provided by the municipality of Pangnirtung. Water trucks fill up at a reservoir adjacent to the hamlet and deliver seven days a week. Sewage is pumped out and treated at the municipal treatment plant. Garbage is picked up five days a week and transported to a landfill that slowly deteriorates due to Arctic temperatures.

For emergency services, it is protected by the 14-member Pangnirtung Fire Department. The fire service uses one pumper with one older reserve from one station. Policing is provided by the Royal Canadian Mounted Police Pangnirtung Detachment attached to V Division.

Mini C, The North West Company (Northern Store), Pangnirtung Inuit Co-op and Co-op Express are the only local retailers and grocery options. KFC Express, Pizza Hut and Co-op Express are the only fast food restaurants in the hamlet. Perishable goods are shipped by air and all other items by sealift when waters are ice-free.

Banking is done through the Co-op or money orders.

Gasoline for cars or snowmobiles is available at the Quickstop or the Co-op.

== Education ==
There are two schools in Pangnirtung:

- Alookie Elementary School - kindergarten to Grade 5
- Attagoyuk Ilisavik High School - Grades 6 to 12

Post secondary-studies opportunities can be made through Nunavut Arctic College's Community Learning Centre.

== Recreation ==
Aksayuk Arena is a sports and recreational centre.

== Transportation ==
Like all Nunavut communities, Pangnirtung is a fly-in community with no road access to the rest of Nunavut. Pangnirtung Airport provides the only viable means of access. There are gravel roads in the community, and residents use SUVs, pickup trucks, 4-wheel ATVs and snowmobiles.

== Places of worship ==
Two churches can be found in Pangnirtung:

- St. Luke's Anglican Church
- Full Gospel (Pentecostal) Church

== Health ==
Basic medical services are available at the Health Centre. Four beds are available for assessment only, with advance care via medevac to Iqaluit.

== Near Pangnirtung ==
Pangnirtung is the nearest town (1 hour by boat) to Auyuittuq National Park and the location of one of two park offices, the other is in Qikiqtarjuaq. Located near the Parks Canada office is the Angmarlik Visitor Centre. Iglunga, now uninhabited, is an Inuit hamlet, just south of Iglunga Island, is about 65 km (40 mi) to the west.

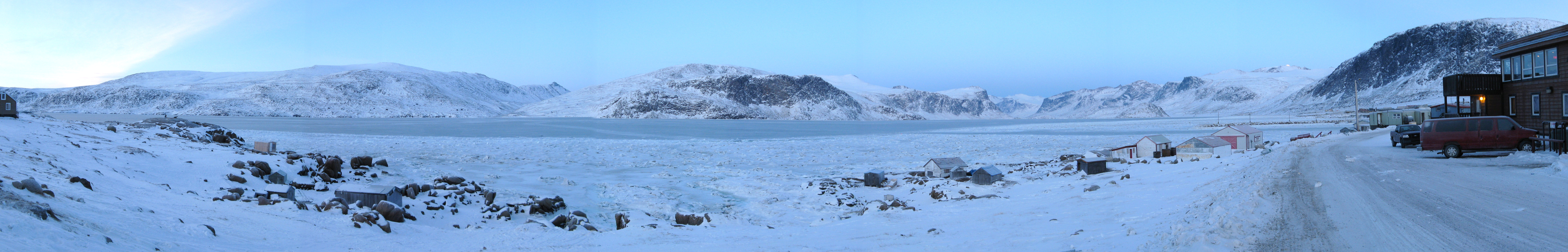
Panorama of Pangnirtung Fiord in winter

=== Small craft harbour ===
In 2009, the then Canadian prime minister, Stephen Harper, proposed building a new modern harbour in Pangnirtung to support the region's turbot-fishing industry. Harper received a warm welcome with many residents gathered at the airport to greet him. The town's 1,500 residents listened as Harper announced that $17 million worth of harbour construction promised in the last two budgets would get underway in the fall of that year. Harper said the greatest potential for the hamlet's future lies in the inshore turbot fishery. The shortfalls of the previous harbour were a big problem for fishermen: When the tide ebbed, the harbour turned to mud.

The work on the harbour was completed in September 2013. The entire project ended up costing about $40.5 million. The improvements to the harbour include a fixed wharf, breakwater, marshalling area, sea lift ramp and a dredged channel and basin. The improvements will allow residents to unload their catches faster by allowing smaller crafts to dock easily and safely.

== Broadband communications ==
The community has been served by the Qiniq network since 2005. Qiniq is a fixed wireless service to homes and businesses, connecting to the outside world via a satellite backbone. The Qiniq network is designed and operated by SSI Micro. In 2017, the network was upgraded to 4G LTE technology and 2G-GSM for mobile voice.

== In popular culture ==
The 2022 Canadian Inuit science fiction film Slash/Back was filmed in Pangnirtung. It was directed by Nyla Innuksuk in her feature debut, and starred largely local actors recruited for the film.

== Notable residents ==
- Elisapee Ishulutaq
- Simeonie Keenainak
- Ipeelee Kilabuk
- Peter Kilabuk, Nunavut's first Minister of Education
- Nakasuk
- Paul Okalik, Nunavut's first premier
- Stephen Osborne
- Andrew Qappik
- Riit
- Aasiva

== Image gallery ==
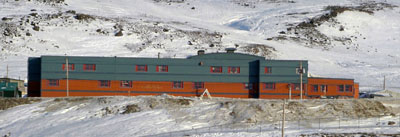
Attagoyuk Ilisavik High School, Pangnirtung

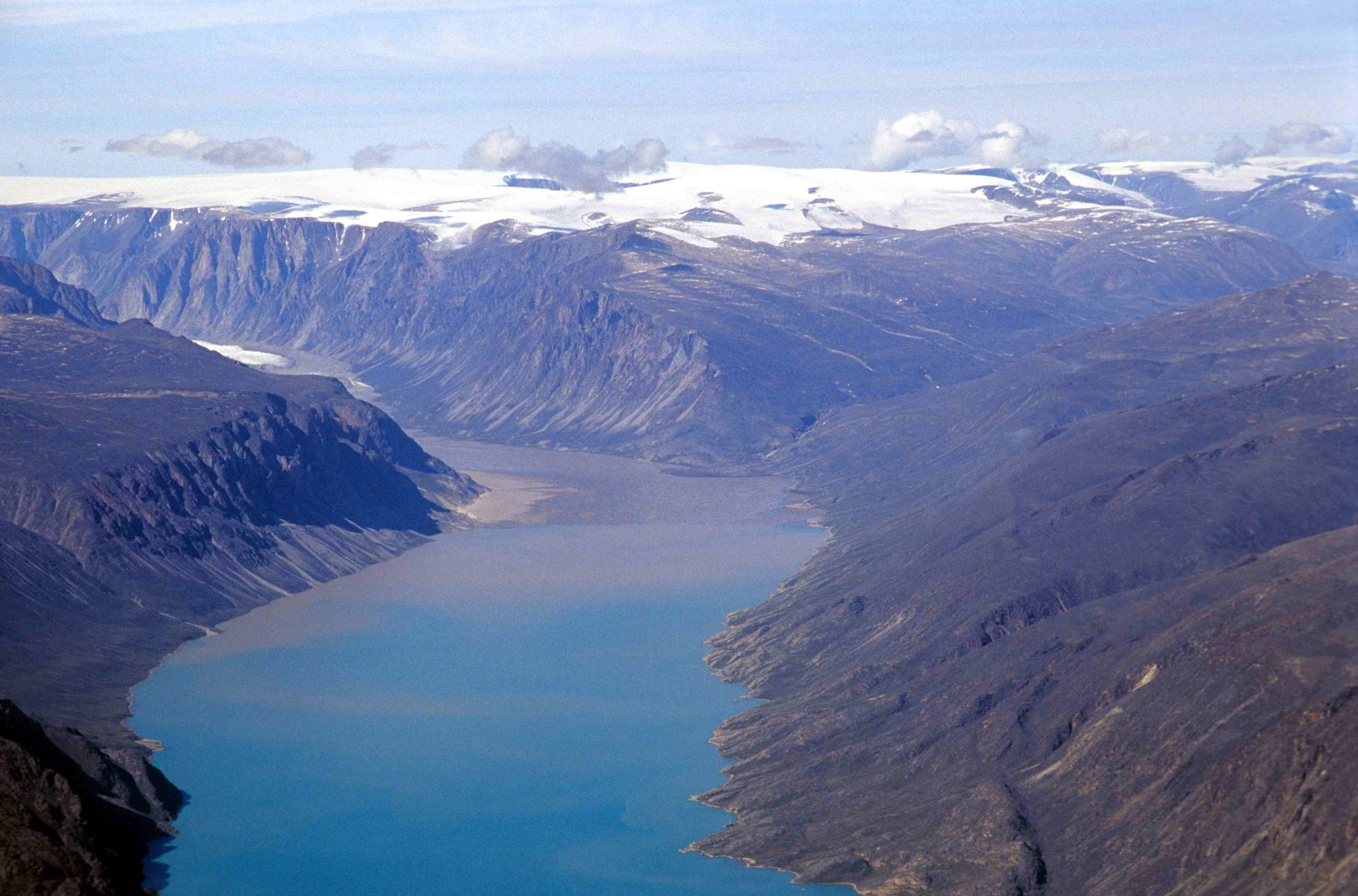
Pangnirtung Fiord

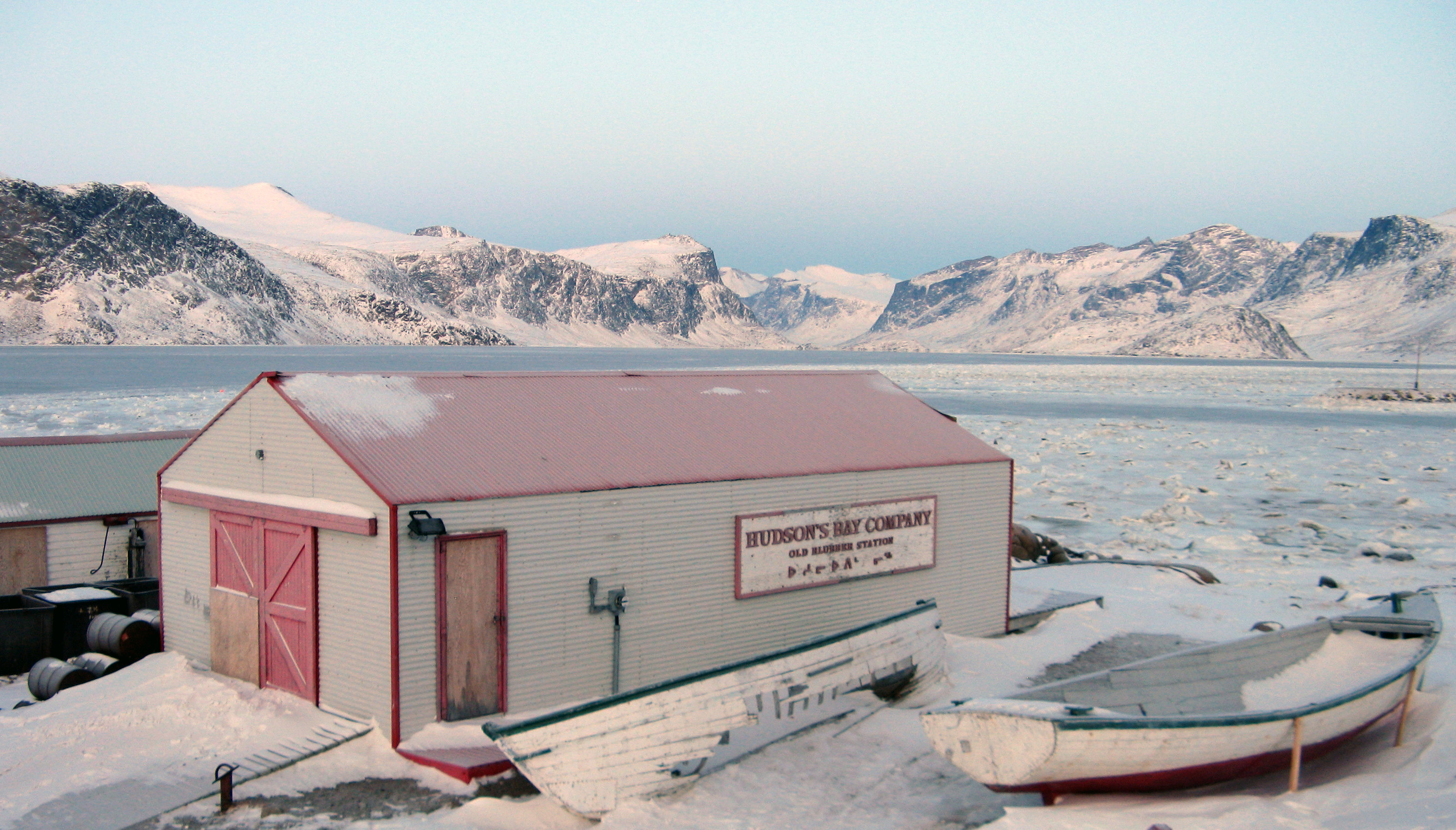
Former Hudson's Bay Blubber Station at Pangnirtung

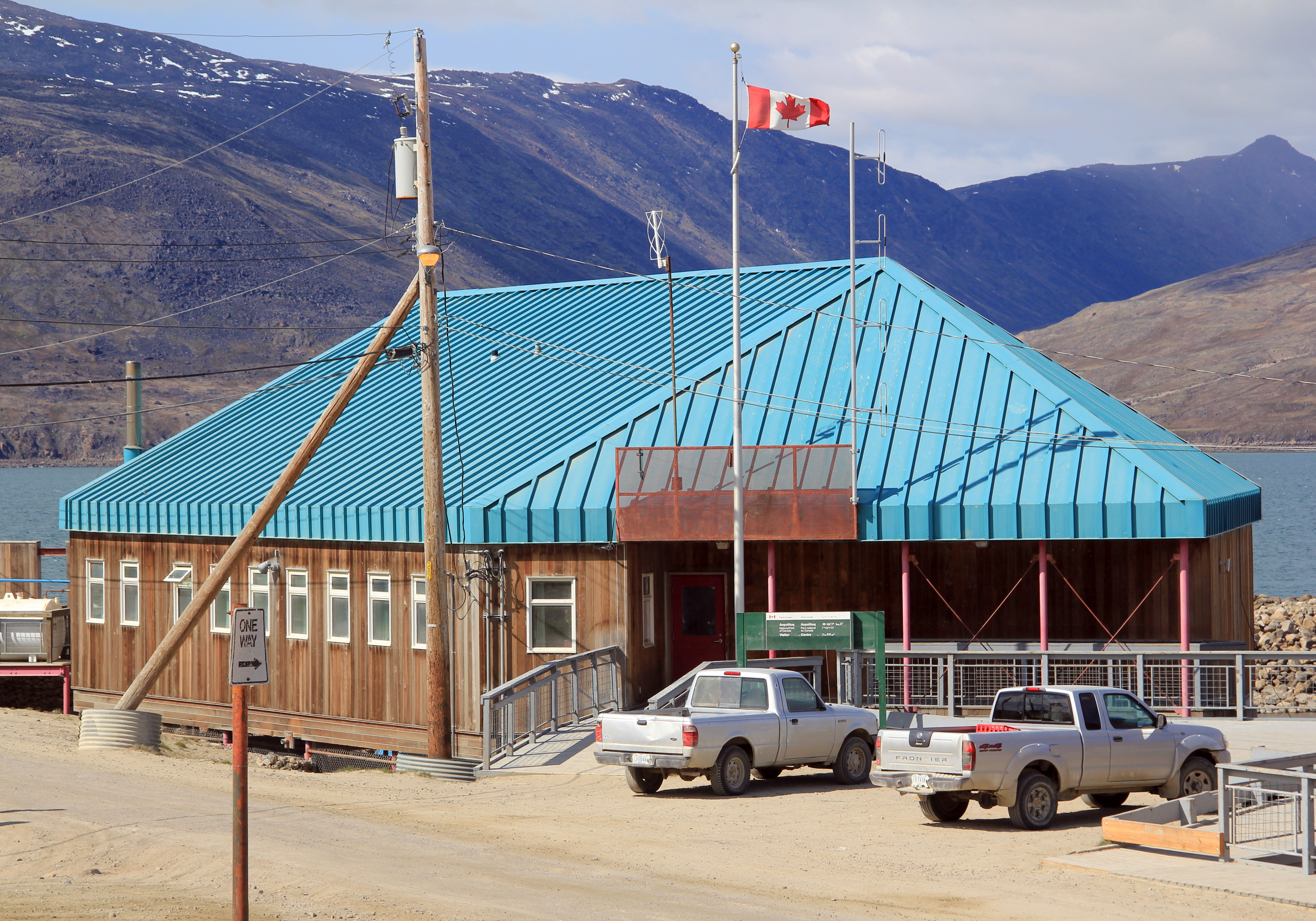
Auyuittuq National Park Office

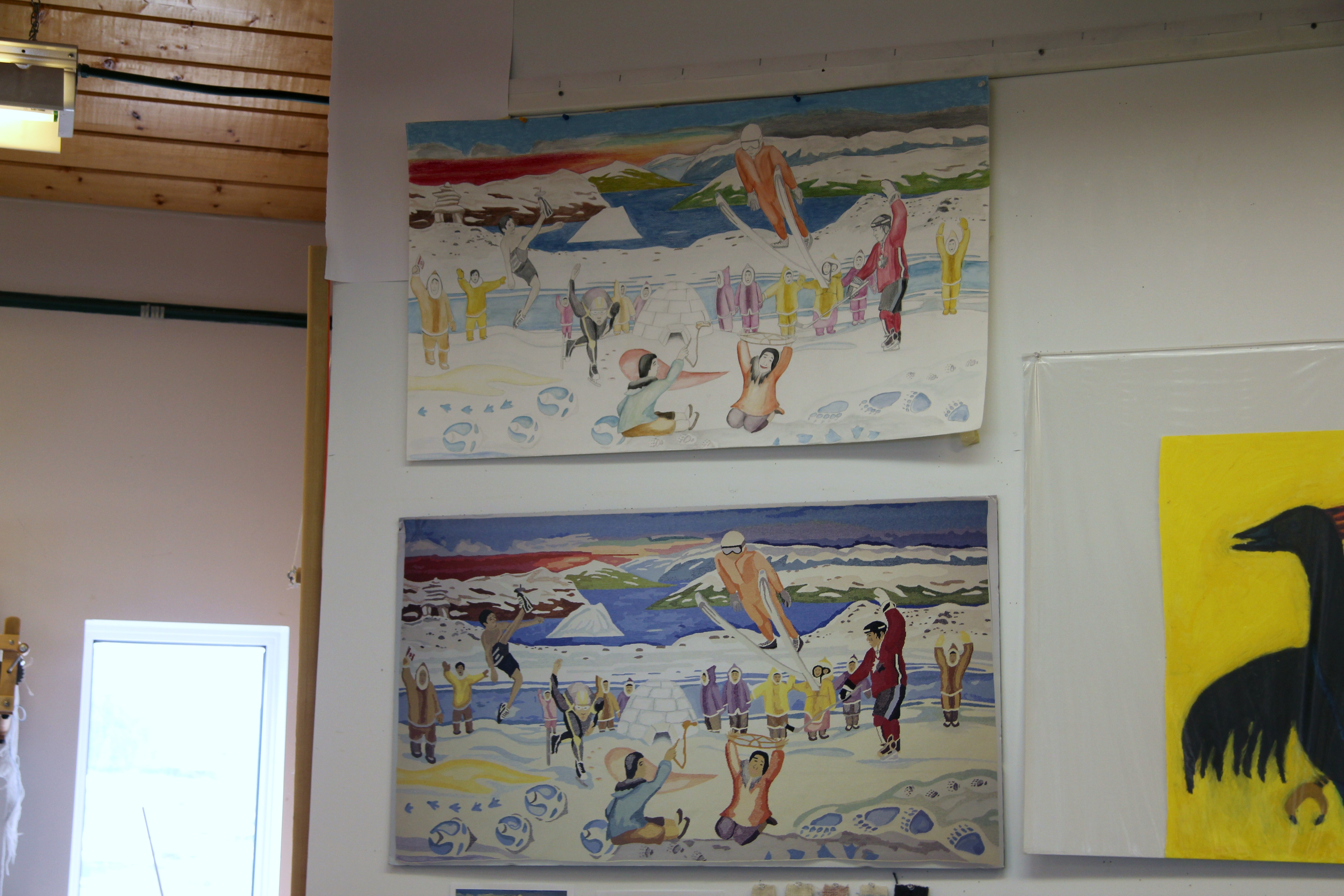
Tapestries at the Uqqurmiut Centre for Arts & Crafts

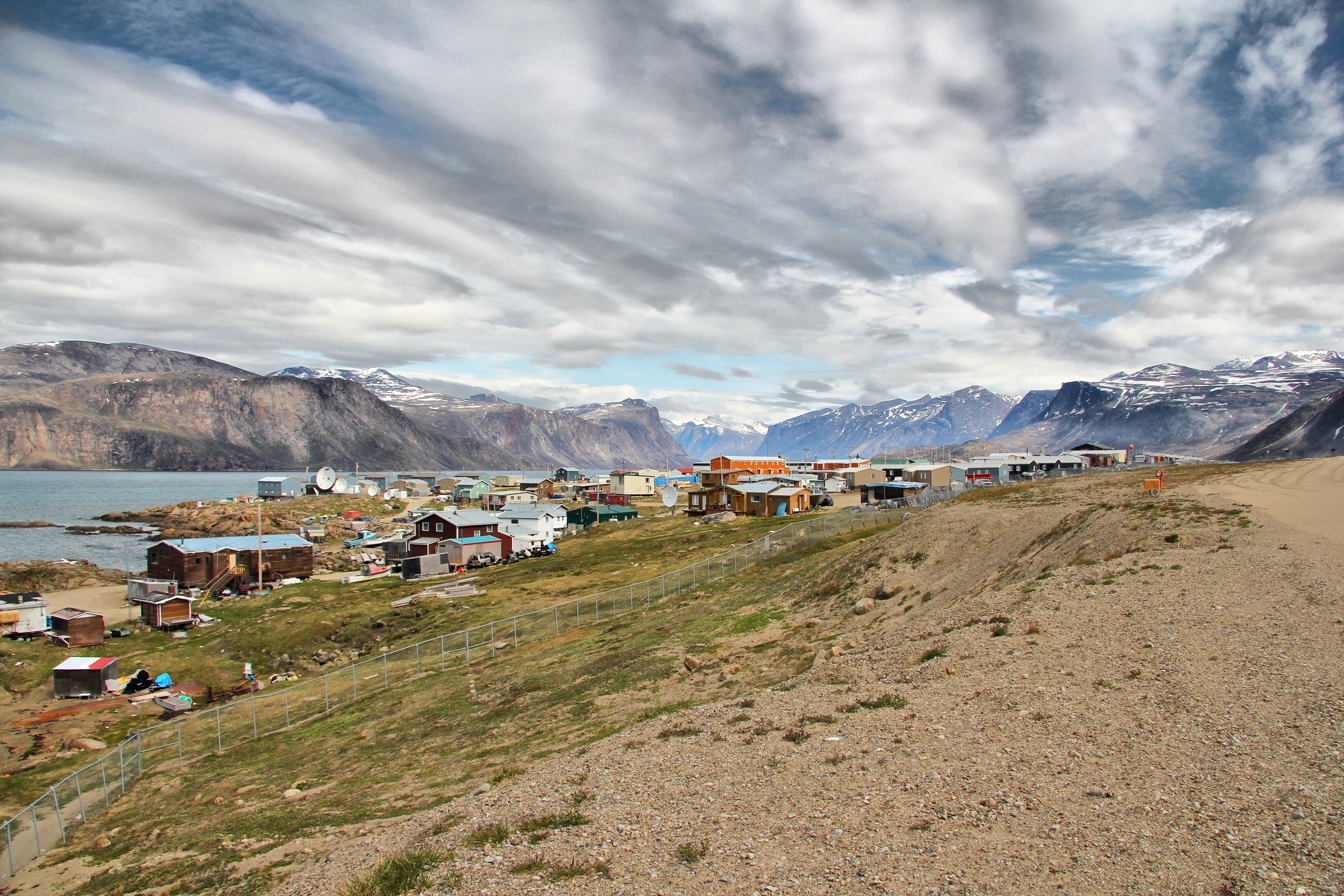
View of Pangnirtung and the mountains

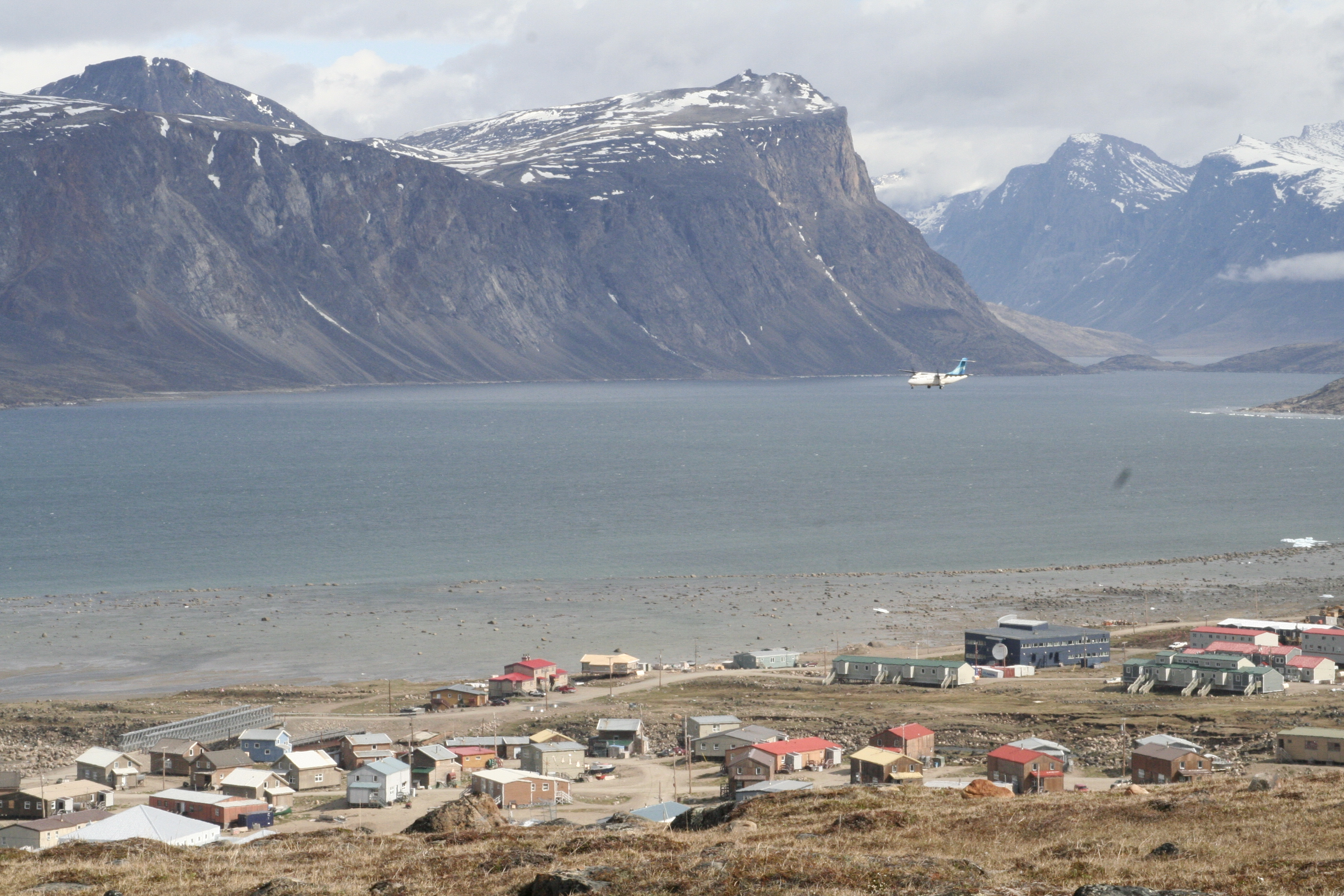
Pangnirtung and the fjord

== See also ==
- List of municipalities in Nunavut
