= Nordic Odin =

Nordic Odin is a panamax bulk carrier owned by Nordic Bulk Carriers. She was built by Oshima Shipbuilding of Saikai, Japan. She was delivered on February 13, 2015. The operation and management of the vessel is contracted out to Unicom Management of Cyprus. Her gross tonnage is 41,071; her deadweight tonnage is 76,180 tonnes.

She left Baffinland's Milne Port with a load of iron ore on August 12, 2015, bound for Gijon, Spain. The first vessel to carry iron ore from the Baffinland Mine was the slightly smaller Federal Tiber, which left four days earlier. Federal Tiber sailed in ice-free conditions, but Nordic Odin did encounter sea ice. She is rated ice class 1A.
