= Labrador Iron Mines =

Mining company

Labrador Iron Mines is a resource extraction company planning to exploit multiple mine sites in the Schefferville region of Newfoundland and Labrador.

== History ==
The Schefferville region had iron mines in the 1950s. A rail line was constructed from Schefferville, south approximately 600 kilometres (370 mi) to Sept-Îles, Quebec, a seaport on the Gulf of St. Lawrence. Labrador Iron Mines first shipments, in April 2012, were the first shipments in thirty years.

In January 2013, the firm announced that it had entered into an agreement with a syndicate of underwriters led by Canaccord Financial for a C$25.2-million equity financing.

== Projects ==
Labrador Iron Mines is currently developing seven mine sites in the Schefferville area. The "James site" was the first to ship ore. Like most ore bodies, and unlike the Baffinland Iron Mines, the ore requires various refining steps, prior to being made into iron or steel.

== Price fluctuations ==
Labrador Iron Mines was formed when iron ore prices were at a record high, making recovery of ore from known ore bodies economically viable. The firm was able to sell ore from its first two quarters of production at a price per ton that would have been viable, once production was at full volume. But in August, 2012, in its third quarter of production, the price of iron ore took a significant drop, and the firm started to defer capital expenditures.
