= Federal Tiber =

Federal Tiber is a bulk carrier. It was the first freighter to ship iron ore from the Baffinland mines, out of Milne Inlet, on its way to Nordenham, Germany, on August 8, 2015. CBC North reported it carried 53,624 tonnes of ore.

The vessel was built in 2011, and is registered in the Marshall Islands. She is owned by MV Baffin Investments, and operated by Anglo-Eastern Ship Management. She is equipped with four large electro-mechanical cranes.

specifications
Gross tonnage	31,590
Deadweight tonnage	55,160 tonnes
Length	190 metres (620 ft)
Breadth	33 metres (108 ft)
Speed	13.7 knots (25.4 km/h)
Ice class	IC

== See also ==
- Nordic Odin
