= Jowdat Waheed =

- Occupation: mining executive
- Known for: allegations of insider trading

Jowdat Waheed is a senior Canadian mining executive and Chartered Financial Analyst. Waheed worked as Chief Executive Officer of mining company Sherritt. He resigned, for personal reasons, in 2009.

According to Business Week Waheed has two Bachelor of Science degrees from the University of Pennsylvania, the first, in Economics, from 1985, the second in System Science and Engineering, from 1986.

In early 2010 he worked as a consultant for the Baffinland Iron Mine, a firm with plans to build a huge open-pit mine in northern Baffin Island, expecting to exploit almost $100 billion Canadian dollars of iron ore. Later in 2010 Waheed helped lead a hostile takeover attempt of all of Baffinland's stock. By December 2010 Waheed and his partners had secured a 30 percent stake in Baffinland.

In January 2012 The Globe and Mail reported that some senior executives were suspected of profiting from "insider trading" of Baffinland stock. According to the Mining Weekly Jowdat Waheed and Bruce Walter tried to exploit information Waheed learned when he worked for Baffinland in early 2010 to try to mount a hostile takeover later in 2010. In February 2012 CBC News reported that a hearing before the Ontario Securities Commission had been scheduled for January 2013. In August 2014 the OSC cleared Waheed and Walter.

The take-over led by Waheed competed with a bid led by European-based mining giant ArcelorMittal. ArcelorMittal's attempt was described as a friendly takeover bid—while the one led by Waheed was described as hostile. When the Ontario Securities Commission declined to make a quick ruling over the allegations that Waheed had violated the rules against insider training ArcelorMittal declined to extend the deadline for its takeover bid.

ArcelorMittal and Waheed's Iron Ore Holdings became partners on January 14, 2011. Reuters reported the four month bidding war had tripled the stock price.

On August 23, 2016, Canadian Underwriters wrote that an appeal by Baffinland shareholders allowed them to sue Waheed, for misrepresentation.
