= Steensby Inlet =

Coordinates: 70°10′N 078°25′W

Steensby Inlet is a waterway in Nunavut's Qikiqtaaluk Region. It extends northerly from Foxe Basin into central Baffin Island. There are several unnamed islands within the inlet, and Koch Island lies outside of it. The Steensby Inlet Ice Stream arose after the deglaciation of Foxe Basin.

It is named in honor of Hans Peder Steensby, ethnographer and professor of geography at the University of Copenhagen.

== Mining ==
Baffinland Iron Mines Corporation is mining for iron ore north of the inlet. Iron ore was first found in the Mary River area in 1962. The Baffinland Iron Mines Corporation had plans to build a 149 km (93 mi) railroad line connecting the inlet to a mine-site in the Mary River area. According to Railway Gazette International, this would have been the most northerly railroad line in the world.
