= MS Nordic Orion =

Sea vessel

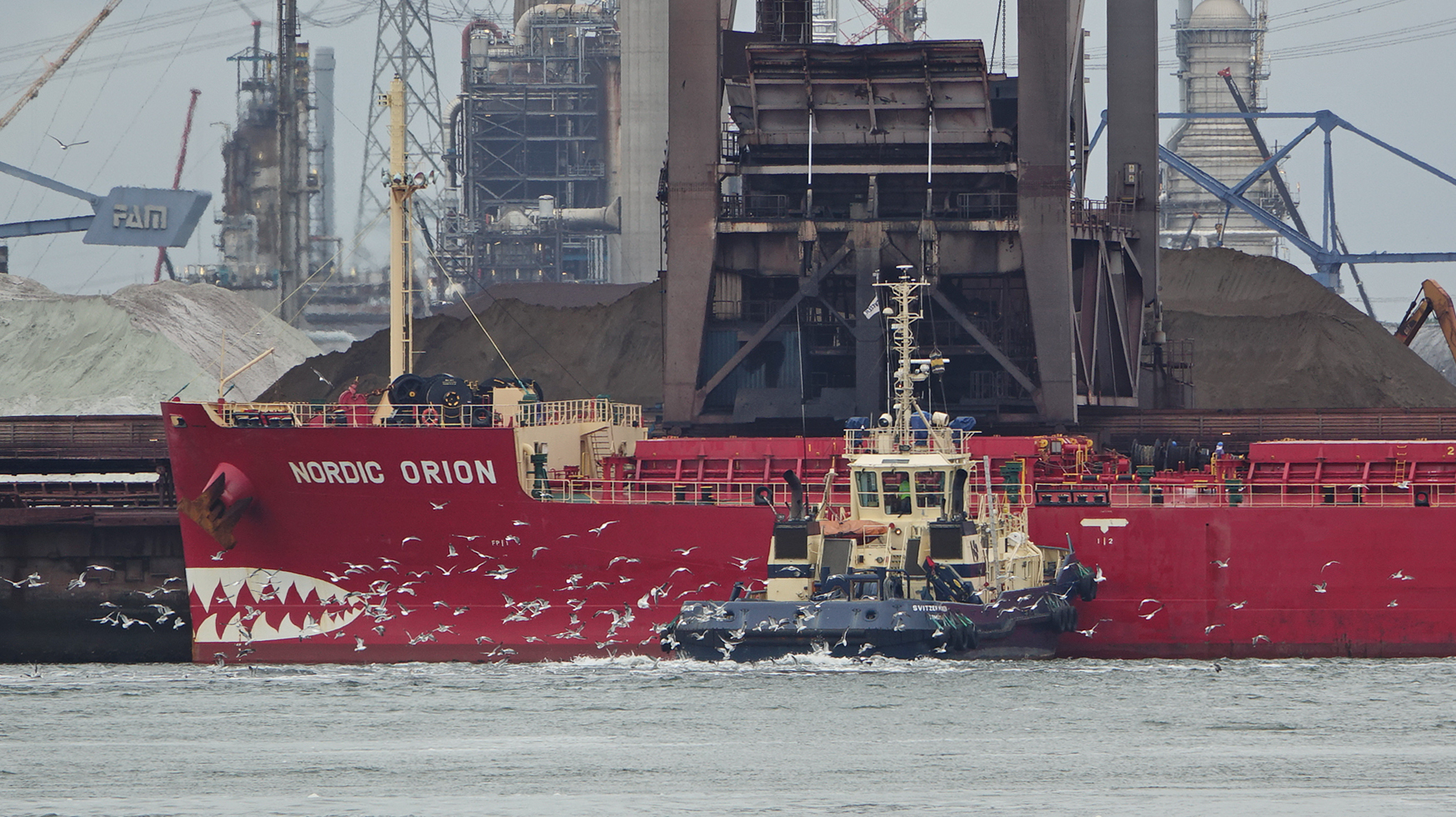
- The bow of the Nordic Orion in 2019

History
- Name: Nordic Orion
- Owner: Bulk Nordic Orion Ltd.
- Operator: Seamar Management S.A.
- Port of registry: Panama City, Panama
- Ordered: 27 March 2006
- Builder: Oshima Shipbuilding Co., Ltd.; Saikai, Japan
- Laid down: 10 June 2010
- Launched: 17 December 2010
- Completed: 4 February 2011
- Identification: DNV ID: 28927; Call sign: 3FDS9; IMO number: 9529463; MMSI number: 373437000
- Status: In service

General characteristics
- Type: Bulk carrier
- Tonnage: 40,142 GT; 25,265 NT; 75,603 DWT
- Length: 225 m (738 ft)
- Beam: 32.31 m (106 ft)
- Draught: 14.089 m (46 ft)
- Depth: 19.39 m (64 ft)
- Ice class: DNV ICE-1A
- Installed power: MAN 6S60MC-C
- Propulsion: Single shaft; fixed pitch propeller
- Speed: 12.9 knots (23.9 km/h; 14.8 mph)

MS Nordic Orion is a Danish bulk carrier registered in Panama City. A coal and ore carrier, Nordic Orion has a capacity of 75,603 tonnes deadweight (DWT). It was built in 2011 by Oshima Shipbuilding. Nordic Orion has an ice-strengthened hull, and it is notable for being the first large sea freighter to transit the Arctic Northwest Passage. It is owned and operated by Nordic Bulk Carriers.

== Voyage through the Northwest Passage ==
Nordic Orion started its voyage from Port Metro Vancouver, Canada, on 6 September 2013, carrying a cargo of 73,500 tons of coking coal. The ship completed its voyage through the passage on 27 September stopping at Nuuk, Greenland and reached its destination, the Port of Pori, Finland on 9 October 2013.

Using the Northwest Passage shortened the distance between Vancouver and Pori by 1,000 nautical miles compared to the traditional route via the Panama Canal. Fuel savings were approximately US $80,000. Nordic Orion was also able to load 15,000 tons more cargo than it could if it had sailed through the Panama Canal, due to the canal's depth limits.

The journey has been described as an opening of a new era on the commercial use of the Arctic. It has also caused criticism from environmental organisations such as the Bellona Foundation. Michael Byers, an expert at the University of British Columbia, warned about shallow waters and icebergs that may cause risk even to ice-strengthened ships. According to Byers, Canada's search and rescue capabilities in the Arctic area are poor.

Nordic Bulk Carriers has acknowledged the Nordic Orion never would have made the voyage if the Canadian Coast Guard had not provided free icebreaker escorts.
