= Mary River Mine =

Iron ore mine on Baffin Island, Nunavut, Canada

Mary River Mine (Baffinland Iron Mine)
- Location within Nunavut Location within Canada
- Interactive map of Mary River Mine (Baffinland Iron Mine)
- Location: Baffin Island, Nunavut, Canada; 71°19′24″N 079°12′38″W
- Products: Iron ore
- Production: CA$507 million
- Financial year: 2019
- Opened: 2014
- Company: Baffinland Iron Mines Corporation
- Website: Mary River Mine
- Acquired: 2011

Mary River Mine is an open-pit iron ore mine in the Mary River area of Baffin Island, Nunavut, Canada. It is operated by the Baffinland Iron Mines Corporation (BIMC). As of 2021, the operation consisted of an open-pit mine, two work camps for hundreds of workers, a tote road—from the Mary River site to Milne Inlet—and port infrastructure at Milne Inlet.

According to a four year study published in 2008, the Mary River Mine, with its four massive iron ore deposits of 65-70% pure iron ore, was "one of the most promising undeveloped iron deposits on the planet". It was not until technological advances were in place in 2010, and the market for iron ore had dramatically increased that sizable financial backing was available for the high cost of development in a remote region known for its inhospitable climate. The mine began operations in 2014, and the first shipment to Europe arrived in 2015.

Baffinland is currently planning on expanding the mine. In February 2021, a group of Inuit hunters blockaded access to the mine for a week to protest the expansion.

In May 2021, a work camp for the mine experienced a COVID-19 outbreak, including the first cases of the highly transmissible SARS-CoV-2 Delta variant in the territory.

== Background ==
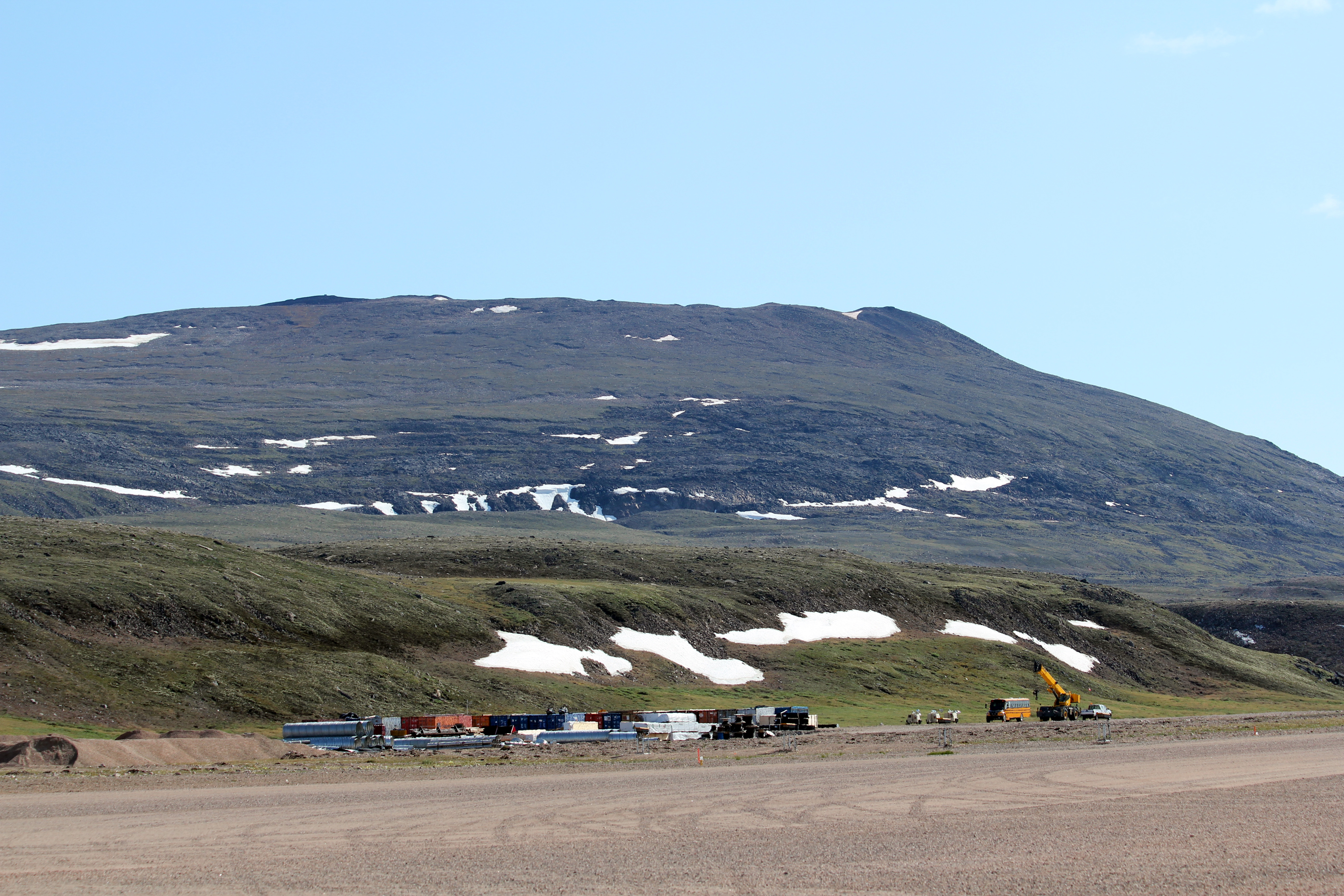
The Mary River mountain (2011) will be levelled like ArcelorMittal's Mont Wright in Quebec.

The Mary River area has "long been known to Inuit as Nuluujaat, a landmark used to travel through North Baffin Island" in what is now known as the Qikiqtaaluk Region, Nunavut.

The Mary River property contains four iron ore deposits, numbered 1, 2, 3 and 4 that contain high grade direct shipping iron ore (DSO), with ore grades between 65% and 70%. Because they require no further processing to be used in blast furnaces for steelmaking they are priced higher than lower grades. The iron ore body was identified in 1962 by Murray Edmund Watts, who was the regional head of Baffinland predecessor company—British Ungava Explorations Ltd. (Brunex). Watts had sighted Mary River's four massive iron ore deposits—large black circles of 65-70% pure iron ore—from his Cessna airplane. Watts died in 1982, and had never been able to find investors for the project. In 1986, a private company, Baffinland Iron Mines Ltd., held the Mary River Project claims and leases.

In 1978, Gordon McCreary submitted his Queen's MBA thesis on the feasibility of developing iron ore in the Mary River area with a focus on transporting the iron ore in Arctic conditions to tidewater by land underlaid with permafrost land, and by sea through packed ice. Richard McCloskey, who became Baffinland's CEO in 2010, had been friends with McCreary in the engineering department at Queen's in 1969. In 2002, McCreary and McCloskey gained a controlling interest in Baffinland. They took it public in 2004, and established Baffinland Iron Mines Corporation. Baffinland then had the funds to complete testing and surveys, and they confirmed the purity of the ore at 65-70% pure and the potential of the resource—337 million tons. The Mary River Mine was "one of the largest undeveloped iron ore deposits in the world". By 2006, the price of iron ore increased as there was a global shortage for the first time since the 1970s. It was at this time that interest in developing iron ore mines in both the Labrador Trough, near Schefferville, Quebec and in Mary River had increased.

In or around the mid-2000s, BIMC presented a proposal to the Qikiqtani Inuit Association (QIA)—the regional Inuit organization authorized by the Nunavut government, that represents Inuit in the entire Baffin Island area—for the Mary River project. The proposal was for an open pit iron ore mine, to be developed and exploited on Inuit-owned land (IOL). The proposal, which was informed by the commissioned report, estimated a total cost of CA$4.1 B, and included a CA$1.2 B 149-kilometre-long (93-mile) cold-weather railway running south—the South Railway—from the mine to a CA$0.7B deep-water all season facility in Steensby Inlet in southern Baffin with a planned production of 18 million tonnes (18 million long tons; 20 million short tons) per annum. By September 2006, a QIA member vocally supported the development of the Mary River project, saying that, "You're talking about [jobs] for your grandchildren—and their grandchildren." By 2006, Baffinland began investigating the feasibility of a cold-weather railway from the Mary River to a mining port and by 2006, Canarail had provided an estimate of CA$350 million to build the railway. Baffinland had considered two options—a North Railway and a South Railway—a 105 km (65 mi) route to Milne Inlet and a 143 km (89 mi) route to Steensby Inlet.

=== Canadian context ===
As of 2024, Canada, with 6 billion t (5.9 billion long tons; 6.6 billion short tons) of iron ore reserves, had 3.0% of the global iron ore resources, making it the sixth largest in the world. The majority of the iron ore in Canada comes from the Labrador Trough, which runs through Quebec and Newfoundland and Labrador, and Nunavut. Quebec produces 41.8 million t (41.1 million long tons; 46.1 million short tons) or 60% while 28.2 million t (27.8 million long tons; 31.1 million short tons), or 40%, is from Newfoundland and Labrador and Nunavut combined. In 2024, Canadian iron ore mines produced 70 million t (69 million long tons; 77 million short tons) of iron ore in concentrate pellets and 12 million t (12 million long tons; 13 million short tons) of crude steel. Of the 70 million t (69 million long tons; 77 million short tons) of iron ore Canada exported 60.9 million t (59.9 million long tons; 67.1 million short tons) at a value of $8.8 billion. Of the iron ore exported 41% of the volume was iron ore pellets and 59% was iron ore concentrates.

In 2011, the Government of Canada, under the direction of the Conservative majority government of Prime Minister Stephen Harper, fostered Arctic exploration and industrial mining as the "beacon of the future" that would "unlock development possibilities in the North." By 2013, "mineral exploration funds" had begun to "dry up" and new development was being scaled back across Northern Canada. In their 2013 book Mining and Communities in Northern Canada: History, Politics, and Memory, the authors said that Baffinland's "massive Mary River project was the most dramatic example—Baffinland "radically curtailed its investment and development plans, cancelling a proposed railway and port development...and scaling back its project investment to $740 million from an initial projection of $4 billion."

=== Iron ore market ===
The iron ore market is volatile and subject to fluctuations, because it is abundant worldwide. The iron ore industry is cyclical.

In 2008, shipment figures of iron ore "broke historical records at US$6.2G" and mining investment reached US$2G. By 2011, China accounted for half of the global production of iron ore, used mainly for steel-making and export. By 2011, iron ore mining in Quebec's Labrador Trough was experiencing a comeback—development projects included ArcelorMittal's Port-Cartier and Fermont and Schefferville, all based in Quebec.

From 2010 through 2013, the global price of iron ore was about US$150 a tonne; it reached a peak of US$177 in August 2011.

ArcelorMittal Canada—formerly Québec Cartier Mining Company—has a huge Fermont iron ore mine complex at Mont Wright that is similar in scale to the Mary River iron ore project, that it now also co-owns. ArcelorMittal operates its private railway, the Cartier Railway connecting to Fermont the mine. In 2011, ArcelorMittal—the owner of Dofasco, based in Hamilton, Ontario—invested $2.1 billion in the expansion of Fermont iron ore mine complex. By May 2011, the Luxembourg-based ArcelorMittal Group—the world's largest steel producer and the co-owner of Baffinland—had plans to increase its annual production of iron ore concentrate from "14 million tons to 100 million tons by 2015".

The price of iron ore declined to US$11.93 in January 1999 and US$40.88 in December 2015. Peaks were US$172.47 in April 2010, US$187.18 in February 2011, and US$215.82 in June 2011.

January Global Iron Ore Prices (1990-2026)
1990	1991	1992	1993	1994	1995	1996	1997	1998	1999	2000	2001	2002	2003	2004	2005	2006	2007	2008
14.05	15.03	14.31	12.58	11.45	12.27	12.97	13.04	13.41	11.93	12.45	12.99	12.68	13.82	16.39	28.11	33.45	36.63	60.80
2009	2010	2011	2012	2013	2014	2015	2016	2017	2018	2019	2020	2021	2022	2023	2024	2025	2026	2027
72.51	125.91	179.63	140.35	150.49	128.12	69.07	42.20	80.82	75.78	75.20	95.22	162.33	133.05	122.43	136.59	103.78	107.45	

=== Construction ===
By 2007, construction of a tote road connecting Mary River mine to Milne Inlet was already underway. Milne Inlet is a shallow inlet that was only ice-free from August to October and opened onto the environmentally sensitive waters of Tasiujaq (Eclipse Sound) and the protected waterways surrounding Bylot Island and Sirmilik National Park, for which Pond Inlet is the gateway. According to David K. Joyce who visited the site in the summer of 2007, the road was expected to carry hundreds of 200 t (200 long tons; 220 short tons) dump trucks per day, every day, for several decades. By August 2007, the US subprime mortgage crisis had negatively impacted Canadian commercial paper, causing it to suddenly crash. With 95% of Baffinland's CA$45.9 million invested in commercial paper—which would normally be very reliable—they had to get an emergency line of credit to pay for provisions for the hundreds of workers, fuel and equipment. McCreary, who served as the company's CEO from 2004 until March 2010, began to seriously seek out investors. Shipping the ore seemed to become more viable as the Arctic sea ice was shrinking.

A 4-year long $170 million commissioned feasibility study, submitted in February 2008, was described by the Canadian Mining Journal as "robust". The report said that the first deposit of iron ore alone would "last between 20 and 34 years" if they shipped between 18 and 30 million tons annually. Because of the purity of the iron ore, there was no processing required so it was direct-shipping. There would be less environmental impact.

In 2008, a joint venture agreement was signed with Nunavut Tunngavik Incorporated and a memorandum of understanding was signed in 2009. At that time, Nunavut Tunngavik controlled the resource exploitation of Inuit owned lands. The agreement allowed Baffinland exploration and resource development rights to 170 square kilometres (66 square miles) of Inuit-owned land adjacent to the mine-site.

Their initial 2008 development, which was based on the recommendations of 4-year study, anticipated initial production of 18 million t (18 million long tons; 20 million short tons) per annum and construction of a CA$1.2b 150 km (93 mi)-long cold weather the South Railway, where they would also build a new C$0.7b port facility at a total estimated cost for the project of CA$4.1 billion. The proposal had included a South Railway to an "all-season deep-water port and ship loading facility at Steensby Inlet" where the iron ore would be shipped through the Foxe Basin.

Public consultations were held in April 2007 in Pond Inlet, Arctic Bay, Kinngait, Clyde River, Igloolik, Sanirajak, and Kimmirut—the hamlets that were "most impacted" by the project.

A crucial part of Baffinland's plan was to use nine 190,000 t (190,000 long tons; 210,000 short tons) icebreakers, making a trip every second day year-round, in a Arctic shipping route from the proposed Steensby Inlet, through Foxe Basin and Hudson Strait to markets overseas—which would be "unprecedented in Arctic shipping history". Baffinland hired Fednav, a Canadian company headquartered in Montreal, which was at that time the only company worldwide that was operating in the Canadian Arctic year-round. At the 2009 Nunavut Impact Review Board (NIRB) public hearings in Igloolik—which is near the proposed marine shipping route from the proposed Steensby Inlet port—the major concern was the impact of the icebreakers operating year-round on marine life in particular, and the environment in general.

In 2008 and 2009, Nunavut's Nunavut Tunngavik Incorporated, the legal representative of the Inuit of Nunavut for the purposes of native treaty rights and treaty negotiation, that controlled the resource exploitation of Inuit owned lands, signed a joint venture agreement and memorandum of understanding with Baffinland. During the 2008 financial crisis, Baffinland had difficulty raising the required capital. In 2007 and 2008, Baffinland mined a large bulk of samples of iron ore from Mary River deposit 1 to be tested by ArcelorMittal and ThyssenKrupp Steel AG in their large-scale blast furnaces in Europe. Baffinland shipped 113,217 t (111,429 long tons; 124,800 short tons) of the sample. In order to ship the iron ore Baffinland had to upgrade the Milne Inlet "tote road" to an all-weather condition. According to the Baffinland January 2010 internal report, ArcelorMittal found that the Mary River fine ore was superior to that which they were using. In February 2010, McCreary hired an experienced mining executive, Jowdat Waheed—an alumnus of Sherritt International and director at Sprint—as a consultant to prepare confidential reports. In March 2010, entered into an exclusivity agreement with ArcelorMittal who were seriously considering the possibility of a transaction with Baffinland. In July Waheed met with Baffinland CEO Richard McCloskey about a phased approach which would include an early stage production of up to 2 million t (2.0 million long tons; 2.2 million short tons)of iron ore at Mary River hauled via the "tote road" and shipped from Milne Inlet.

In August 2010, after completing his report for Baffinland, Waheed had partnered with Bruce Walter, a Toronto-based "mining entrepreneur and dealmaker", who had spent his "entire career negotiating mergers and acquisitions, particularly in the mining sector" to create the Baffinland acquisition vehicle, Nunavut Iron Ore Acquisition Inc. with funds from the Energy and Minerals Group. Nunavut Iron Ore is owned by The Energy & Minerals Group, a "private Houston-based fund that makes equity investments of $150 to $400 million in entities with talented, experienced management teams" which is providing the majority of the "equity financing for the Offer". After ArcelorMittal made an offer to purchase Baffinland, Nunavut Iron made a counteroffer. Over a period of about six months, a bidding war took place, resulting in an almost doubling of the offered price. Baffinland discouraged its shareholders from selling to either ArcelorMittal or the hostile bidder Nunavut Iron Ore. In December, McCreary, went to China hoping to finalize a deal to prevent either ArcelorMittal or Nunavut Iron Ore from acquiring the company he had spent decades of his life building. McCreary strongly disagreed with the phase approach that Waheed had suggested, in which the company would begin to haul and iron ore on a tote road from Mary River mine to Milne Inlet where it would be shipped. A January 2011 La Presse article described the Mary River Mine, as "one of the most promising undeveloped iron deposits on the planet" that was "hiding north of Baffin Island, in the Canadian Arctic Archipelago. On January 14, 2011, Nunavut Iron and ArcelorMittal agreed to a merger. In 2014, ArcelorMittal had retained the position of Project Operator.

Walter described his role in the 2011 "battle" for "control of Baffinland Iron Mines (BIM-T) and its massive Mary River iron ore project." Walter said that the hostile takeover was one of the most "exciting", "intriguing", and "challenging of his career." He described how he had "masterminded" a joint offer with ArcelorMittal, following a "four-month battle for Baffinland" that resulted in the two companies making a "joint offer for Baffinland of $1.50 per share, valuing the company at $590 million." Walter depended heavily on their legal firms that "earned their keep on this one because there wasn't a time until right at the very end that we weren't conducting negotiations on multiple fronts...There were a lot of moving pieces in this thing and a lot of players who could potentially have come in and played a role . . . Let's just say that what was visible publicly was 25% of what was going on." By 2014, the Ontario Securities Commission had exonerated Waheed and Walter, who had been accused of insider trading, in a high-profile case, by allegedly exploiting insider information that Waheed had gathered while on contract with Baffinland earlier in 2010, to mount a hostile takeover in August.

By November 2011, Arcelor owned 70% but Nunavut Iron planned on acquiring another 30% stake for $1.5 billion. Baffinland is owned jointly by Nunavut Iron Ore, which owns 72%, and ArcelorMittal with 28% as of June 30, 2020, according to Moody's.

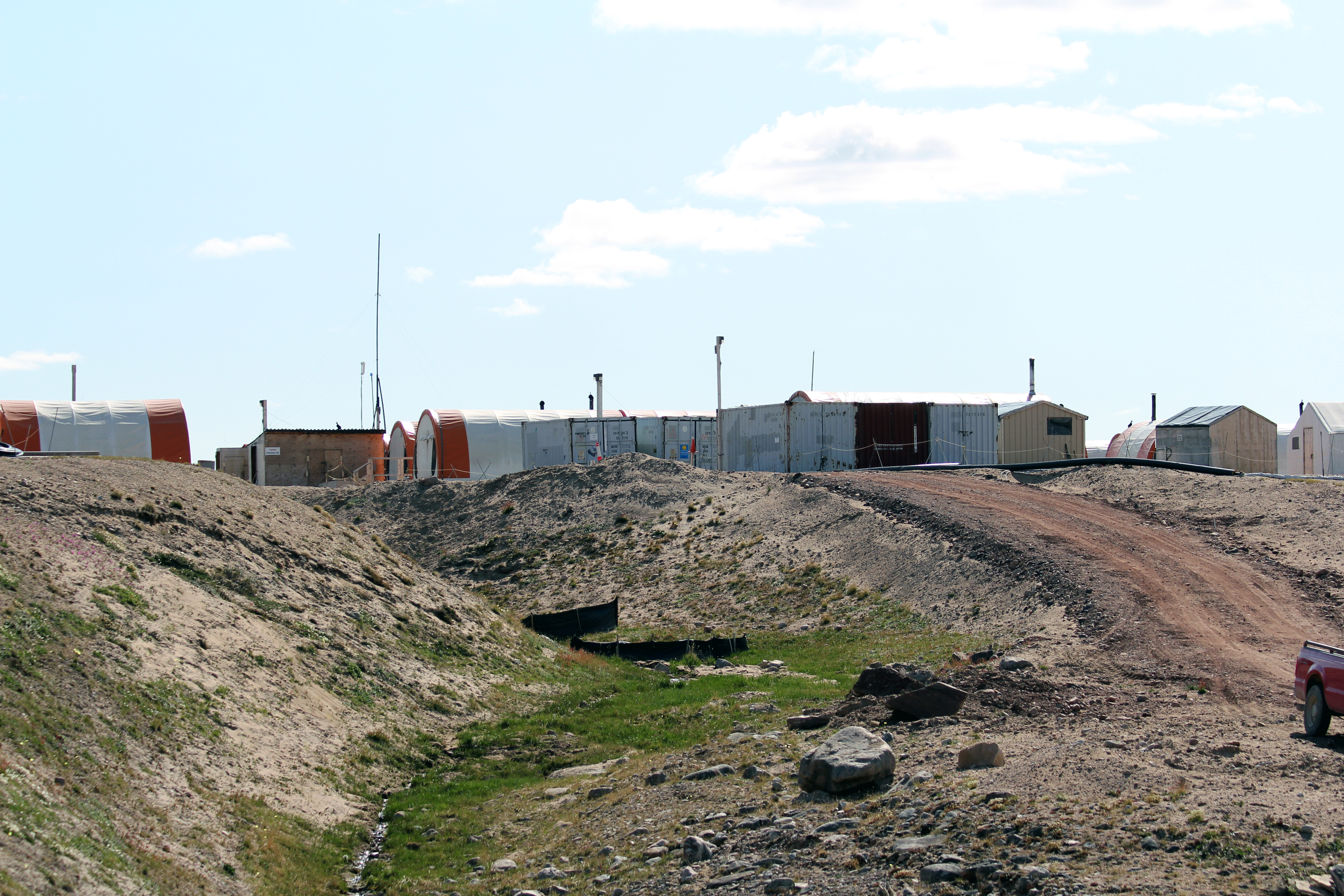
Mary River camp

On December 28, 2012, after four years of a rigorous social and environmental assessment process, which included numerous public meetings with local Inuit communities that would be impacted by the development, the Nunavut Impact Review Board (NIRB) issued BIMC its certificate and license for its initial 2008 Mary River project. This consisted of mining and shipping iron ore at a rate of 18 million t (18 million long tons; 20 million short tons) per year, constructing the South Railway and port facilities at Steensby Inlet. In 2013, Baffinland requested and received an amendment to its 2012 FIRB certificate for the project's final environmental impact statement (FEIS). The initial 2012 certificate was still in force, allowing Baffinland to transport and ship 18 Mtba through Steensby Inlet if and when the South Railway and port were built. On April 23, Baffinland asked the Nunavut Planning Commission (NPC) and NIRB for a further amendment to the North Baffin Regional Land Use Plan (NBRLUP) which would allow them to increase production from 4.2 to 6 million t (4.1 to 5.9 million long tons; 4.6 to 6.6 million short tons) per and to allow them haul and ship using the tote road and Milne Inlet port.

== Operations ==
=== Early Revenue Phase ===
On May 28, 2014, the NIRB approved Baffinland's Early Revenue Phase proposal after a review that took place from 2013 to 2014. Baffinland's initial Early Revenue Phase allowed the company to haul and ship up to 4.2 million t (4.1 million long tons; 4.6 million short tons) per year.

Mary River Mine became operational in September 2014, and by August 8, 2015, the first shipment of ore from the mine, departed for Germany from Milne Inlet. In 2015, the finished ore production was 1,331 thousand wet metric tonnes (wmt), and by 2018 it reached 5,443 thousand wmt—in 2019 it increased slightly to 5,700 thousand wmt. (Note: Usually, production is quoted in wet metric tonnes (wmt). The price of iron ore is based on dry metric tonnes (dmt), which represents 8% less than the wet metric tonnes, adjusting for moisture content.)

The local Hunters and Trappers Association, who had been included in the NIRB public meetings, became increasingly concerned with acoustic and iron ore dust pollution, and—in the early years— fuel and contaminated water pollution. By 2014, the global price of iron ore had declined dramatically. The new owners had already begun to consider abandoning the construction of the more environmentally-sensitive—but much higher capital investment intense—South Railway in 2010 during the bidding war and to consider an alternate proposal a 100 km (62 mi) Mary River-Milne Inlet tote road.

In 2018, Baffinland requested and received permission to increase the Early Revenue Phase amount of metric tons they could haul and ship a year to 6 million t (5.9 million long tons; 6.6 million short tons).

In November 2019, Baffinland said that because of the uncertainty of the NIRB Phase 2 assessment process, they were laying off 586 Mary Mine contract employees, including 96 Inuit and 490 non-Inuit.

As of 2021, Baffinland was still in its Early Revenue Phase as defined by the NIRB. The board has already extended the period so that the company could "continue... hauling and shipping of up to 6 million tonnes (Mtpa) of iron ore" annually until the end of 2021. (Note: 6 million t (5.9 million long tons; 6.6 million short tons))

=== Phase 2 Proposal ===
Prior to its formal submission of its October 29, 2014, its Mary River Phase 2 Proposal to the Nunavut Planning Commission (NPC), Baffinland had begun to request major changes to its 2012 regulations, within a year of the completion of NIRD's 2012 environmental review. Phase 2 expansion also includes plans for an increase of up to 176-ships transiting through the "environmentally sensitive waters" of Tasiujaq before reaching the open sea. It included extending the shipping season to ten months with the shipping season ending on November 15.

Baffinland submitted its Mary River Phase 2 Proposal to the Nunavut Planning Commission (NPC) on October 29, 2014, and has plans for even more expansion in a Phase 3, with a potential to eventually produce 18 million t (18 million long tons; 20 million short tons) more annually in the future. According to a June 2020 Moody's Investors Service credit report, "Baffinland plans to expand the Mary River mine to a capacity of 18 Mtpa 18 million metric tons, or tonnes" in Phase 3. (Note: 18 million t (18 million long tons; 20 million short tons))

Their 2014 Phase 2 submission asked for an allowance to use ultra-large dump trucks to convey the iron ore "tote road"—which by then had already been built—to a replacement port at Milne Inlet near Pond Inlet. They requested the doubling of the existing tonnage of 6 to 12 million t (5.9 to 11.8 million long tons; 6.6 to 13.2 million short tons) of ore to be shipped from Milne Inlet for up to 10 months each year, and the expansion of the Milne Inlet port facilities. Phase 2 expansion also includes plans for an increase of up to 176-ships transiting through the protected waters of Tasiujaq before reaching the open sea. CBC reported in November 2014, that Nunavummiut felt shock, surprise and anger at these proposed changes.

Other amendments included operating 75 ultra-large dump trucks, instead of the 22 required by Mine proposal. The increased number of trucks would require widening the road, "twinning" portions of it, from one lane to two, and twinning some bridges. The port facilities would need to be enlarged, to house more staff, and to store more ore. Milne Inlet is not as open to large, deep draft cargo vessels as Steensby Inlet. Therefore, Baffinland wanted to increase the number of departures to 150 per year.

The price for iron ore dropped by approximately 40% between October 2013 and September 2014. Baffinland requested changes to existing regulations to allow for 12 million t (12 million long tons; 13 million short tons) of ore to be shipped from Milne Inlet for up to 10 months each year, which represented a doubling of its existing tonnage. Other major changes requested included expansion of the Milne Inlet port facilities.

Baffinland Iron Mines Corporation's open-pit mine has attracted international attention for its planned Phase 2 expansion, that would see a dramatic increase in shipping from its Milne Inlet port in Tasiujaq through a narwhal habitat in the waters near Greenland. Milne Inlet is a "small inlet" that "opens into Eclipse Sound, a primary summering area for Nunavut's largest population of narwhal". Freighters now enter and exit Tallurutiup Imanga National Marine Conservation Area—a national marine conservation area on their way to the sea. The iron ore shipping lanes, which go through a narwhal habitat, will threaten this population which is just beginning to return after a hundred years.

Radio Canada International described Baffinland's request for an amendment to ship from Milne Inlet instead of building the expensive South Railway on permafrost as "contentious". Baffinland's request stirred fear and distrust from residents of nearby communities, who appealed to Bernard Valcourt, at the tineMinister of Aboriginal Affairs and Northern Development, to turn down the request.

On July 6, 2016, the World Wildlife Fund (WWF), one of the organizations that sits on an oversight board, the mine's Marine Environment Working Group, criticized Baffinland for a lack of transparency. According to the WWF, by 2016, long after the project's 2012 approval, Baffinland lacked "formal guidelines to inform the level of data the company collects on its project, and how its analyses are reported".

In 2019, revenues were $507 million. In their 2020 credit rating for BIMC, Moody's described the Mary River Mine, as a "small single mine in a remote location" in the Arctic.

By 2020, Mary River mine operation consisted of an open-pit mine with "crushing and screening facilities", a tote road and a port infrastructure at Milne Inlet, for the transportation and loading of iron ore for shipment by sea. The mine has an airstrip and an Mary River Aerodrome for passengers and freight. The company leases freighters, including panamax bulkers and icebreakers. Under their current certificate they use 22 ultra-large dump trucks to transport iron ore to Milne Inlet.

In a 2021 letter to the Nunavut Impact Review Board, the mayor of Pond Inlet, Joshua Arreak, said that the hamlet would not support the phase two project unless Baffinland agreed to slow down their increase in production to yearly increments of 1.5 million tonnes per year." (Note: 1.5 million t (1.5 million long tons; 1.7 million short tons))

By January 2021, the NIRB confirmed that the final public hearings regarding the Phase 2 proposal, remained on schedule in spite of requests made by the Mittimatalik Hunters and Trappers Organization of Pond Inlet and the hamlet of Clyde River for postponements, as their southern attorneys could not be physically present with COVID-19 pandemic restrictions in place.

In 2021, in Iqaluit and Pond Inlet, Nunavut Impact Review Board public hearings are underway for the proposed expansion of the mine, which would result in an increase in shipping at Milne Inlet, the main port for the mine. Environmental concerns include the impact of 176 ships travelling to and from Milne Inlet annually. Milne Inlet "opens onto and lies within" Tallurutiup Imanga National Marine Conservation Area—a Canadian national marine conservation area in Lancaster Sound—and a narwhal habitat.

The NIRB public hearings regarding the Phase 2 expansion scheduled for December 2020, were controversial. Among the changes to be discussed was the addition of the North Railway, a 110 km (68 mi) railway to the mine's port at Milne Inlet to replace the "tote road". The final public hearings for the NIRB review of Phase 2 expansion are scheduled for March 2021.

==== Phase 2 amendment rejected by NPC ====
When the Nunavut Planning Commission (NPC) announced on April 8, 2015, that BIMC's Phase 2 amended project had not conformed to requirements under the NBRLUP, in a controversial move by the AAND minister immediately gave Baffinland an exemption, that bypassed Nunavut's regulatory channels, which led to the beginning of a second multi-year NIRB assessment process that has continued into 2021. A 2015 Nunatsiaq News article said that the federal government had placed itself at the "centre of a big regulatory fight" over BIMC's "ambitious and controversial expansion plan" for the Mary River Mine.

When the NPC told BIMC on April 8, 2015, that their Phase 2 expansion would require a new NIRB assessment as it did "not conform to the North Baffin Regional Land Use Plan, Baffinland had requested that Bernard Valcourt, at the time the Minister of Aboriginal Affairs and Northern Development, grant an NBRLUP exemption. The Canadian Arctic and Arctic sovereignty had been a focus during the premiership of then Conservative Prime Minister Stephen Harper from 2006 until November 2015. By May 2015, Valcourt was at the "centre of a big regulatory fight" over Baffinland Iron Mines Corp's "ambitious and controversial expansion plan" for the Mary River Mine, when Valcourt granted the exemption. Baffinland then brought its contentious amended Phase 2 proposal directly to the Nunavut Impact Review Board.

The first shipment from Mary River mine left Milne Inlet on August 8, 2015, with a load of 53,624 t (52,777 long tons; 59,110 short tons) of iron ore on a bulk carrier destined for Germany. As the first shipment was being loaded at Milne Inlet, the local community were very concerned, as Baffinland had requested that the use of icebreakers to lengthen the three-month long shipping season so they could "ship ore through Baffin Bay 10 months of the year." CBC reported in November 2014, that Baffinland's proposal to ship iron ore from Milne Inlet 10 months a year left Nunavutmiut feeling shock, surprise and anger.

The NIRB informed Minister Valcourt, and a Baffinland Vice President, Erik Madsen on August 31, 2015, that they were recommending to the federal government that Baffinland's Phase 2 amendments were significant enough to require a full assessment which would include public hearings. These significant amendments included "new and upgraded infrastructure at its Milne Inlet port", as well as other changes, NIRB also requires an "addendum to its current final environmental impact statement detailing proposed changes, impacts and mitigation efforts".

==== 2017 amendment ====
On February 3, 2017, Baffinland requested an expansion of the Mary River-Milne Bay transportation corridor, which was granted on March 18, 2018.

==== 2018 amendment ====
On April 23, 2018, Baffinland submitted a request to the NPC and NIRB to amend the NBRLUP and Mary River project certificate, which increased the total production / shipping amount from 18 to 22 million t (18 to 22 million long tons; 20 to 24 million short tons) per annum, with an additional 4.2 million t (4.1 million long tons; 4.6 million short tons) per annum of ore being transported by truck over the Mary River-Milne Inlet "tote road" they had already constructed. In their August 2018, general summary, Baffinland described this amendment to the Phase 2 proposal as having an increase from 6 to 12 million t (5.9 to 11.8 million long tons; 6.6 to 13.2 million short tons) per annum, as well as, the construction of a new North Railway that would run parallel to the existing Milne Inlet "tote road". In the Phase 2 proposal 2018 amendment, the total mine production would eventually increase to 30 million t (30 million long tons; 33 million short tons) per annum. This includes the original certificate of 18 million t (18 million long tons; 20 million short tons) per annum transported on the South Railway, and the 12 million t (12 million long tons; 13 million short tons) per annum transported on the North Railway and shipped through Milne Inlet. These increased production projections with an annual production of 30 million t (30 million long tons; 33 million short tons) of iron ore was to be achieved by constructing two railways, north and south, and by using both Milne Bay and Steensby Inlet for shipping.

By 2019, Baffinland's Phase 2 expansion included two railway-port proposals, a North Railway 110 km (68 mi) from Mary River to Milne Inlet and the 150 km (93 mi) South Railway for which they already had a 2012 project certificate. With these future expansions, Baffinland's goal was to carry an additional 18 million t (18 million long tons; 20 million short tons) annually with "ships sailing through Foxe Basin and Davis Strait" to markets in Europe and elsewhere around the globe.

In May 2022, the NIRB rejected Baffinland's 2018 request, stating that expansion of the mine would potentially incur "significant and lasting negative effects on marine mammals, the marine environment, fish, caribou and other terrestrial wildlife, vegetation and freshwater," and that "these negative effects could also impact Inuit harvesting, culture, land use and food security."

== Transportation ==
=== Shipping routes and carriers ===
By 2021, the only operational port was in Milne Inlet with a shipping route that including transiting through protected waters surrounding Bylot Island. Baffinland has plans to develop a second port on Steensby Inlet in the south with a more environmentally sensitive route through Foxe Basin and Davis Strait. A third potential ship route is through the Northwest Passage.

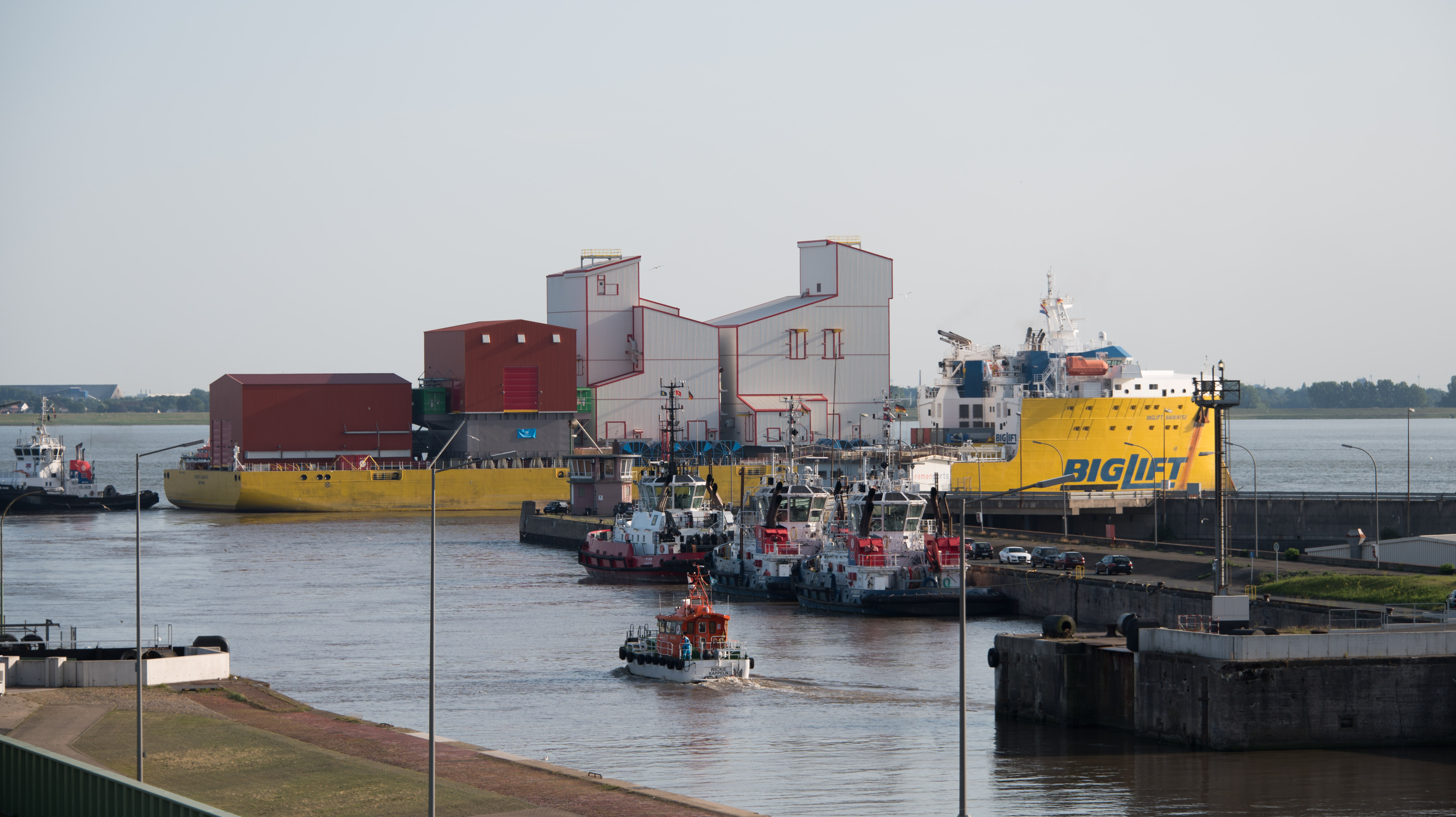
Biglift Barentsz with rock crusher for Mary River

In July 2019 the deck cargo ship Biglift Barentsz left Bremerhaven, Germany loaded with a rock crusher for Mary River mine. This ship fits into the heavy-lift ship category.

==== Steensby Inlet port ====
Baffinland's NIRB 2012 certificate authorizes them to develop and use an "all-season deep-water port and ship loading facility" at Steensby Inlet on the coast of southeast Baffin Island. The southern route from Steensby Inlet through Foxe Basin south through Davis Strait to the Atlantic, is the more environmentally sensitive route.

==== Milne Inlet port facilities ====
However, as iron ore prices declined significantly from 2013 onwards, Baffinland chose the less capital intensive option of developing marine infrastructure at Milne Inlet. By 2015, there a small port had been constructed at Milne Inlet and was ready for the August shipping date.

For mining and engineering enthusiasts the innovative technology used to move the ore from the shallow inlet by barges to a freighter waiting off-shore, was welcomed. To the local community, concerns were raised about the use of Milne Inlet for industrial shipping purposes. Milne Inlet has "shallow depths, high tides", and "strong winds" and a short shipping season of about 90 days, from August to mid-October when it freezes over. Freighters must transit via the protected waterways around Bylot Island—Tasiujaq to reach Baffin Bay, between Greenland and Baffin Island to the north Atlantic Ocean. The first shipment was controversial since Baffinland had requested year-round shipping.

For the 2018 shipping season, Baffinland contracted ice-breakers from July through October In a November 8, 2018, announcement, they said that they had shipped a record volume of ore—over 5 million t (4.9 million long tons; 5.5 million short tons) via Milne Inlet. Two of the freighters transited Russia's Northern Sea Route, on their way to destinations in Asia. In November 2018, Baffinland Iron Mines set a 5 million t (4.9 million long tons; 5.5 million short tons) shipping record. At the end of the 2018, 86-day shipping season on October 17, Baffinland Iron Mines had made 71 trips from Milne Inlet to destination such as "continental Europe, and the UK, including two trips Taiwan and Japan, along the Russian coast. Carrying an "average 71,750 tonnes of iron ore each" (Note: 71,750 t (70,620 long tons; 79,090 short tons)) they became the largest "shipping program by volume for the Canadian and Scandinavian high Arctic."

==== Bulk carriers ====
In their initial 2008 plans using the Steensby Inlet port, in full operation there would be nine icebreakers. These freighters, each displacing 190,000 t (190,000 long tons; 210,000 short tons), subcontracted with Fednav and filled every two days, shipping 18 million t (18 million long tons; 20 million short tons) annually via Foxe Basin and Davis Strait to markets in Europe and elsewhere.

The first ship full of ore in the Early Revenue Phase, was the Federal Tiber, a bulk carrier, that left Milne Inlet on August 8, 2015, with the first shipment of 53,624 t (52,777 long tons; 59,110 short tons) of iron ore and arrived in Nordenham, Germany, at the mouth of the Weser several weeks later.

On August 12, 2015, the newly built Nordic Bulk Carrier's relatively light Nordic Odin, built in 2015 with a deadweight tonnage is 76,180 t (74,980 long tons; 83,970 short tons), a 1A ice class, left Baffinland's Milne Inlet port loaded with iron ore, and arrived in Spain about two weeks later, according to Splash247, making it the first panamax bulker to carry iron ore from Baffin Island, Canada to Europe through Arctic sea ice. She encountered sea ice. According to Splash247, Nordic Bulk Carrier acquired a five-year contract, worth $135 million—with four panamax and two handysize vessels allocated to the contract, carrying 30 loads of ore a year from Baffinland.

==== Ice-breakers ====
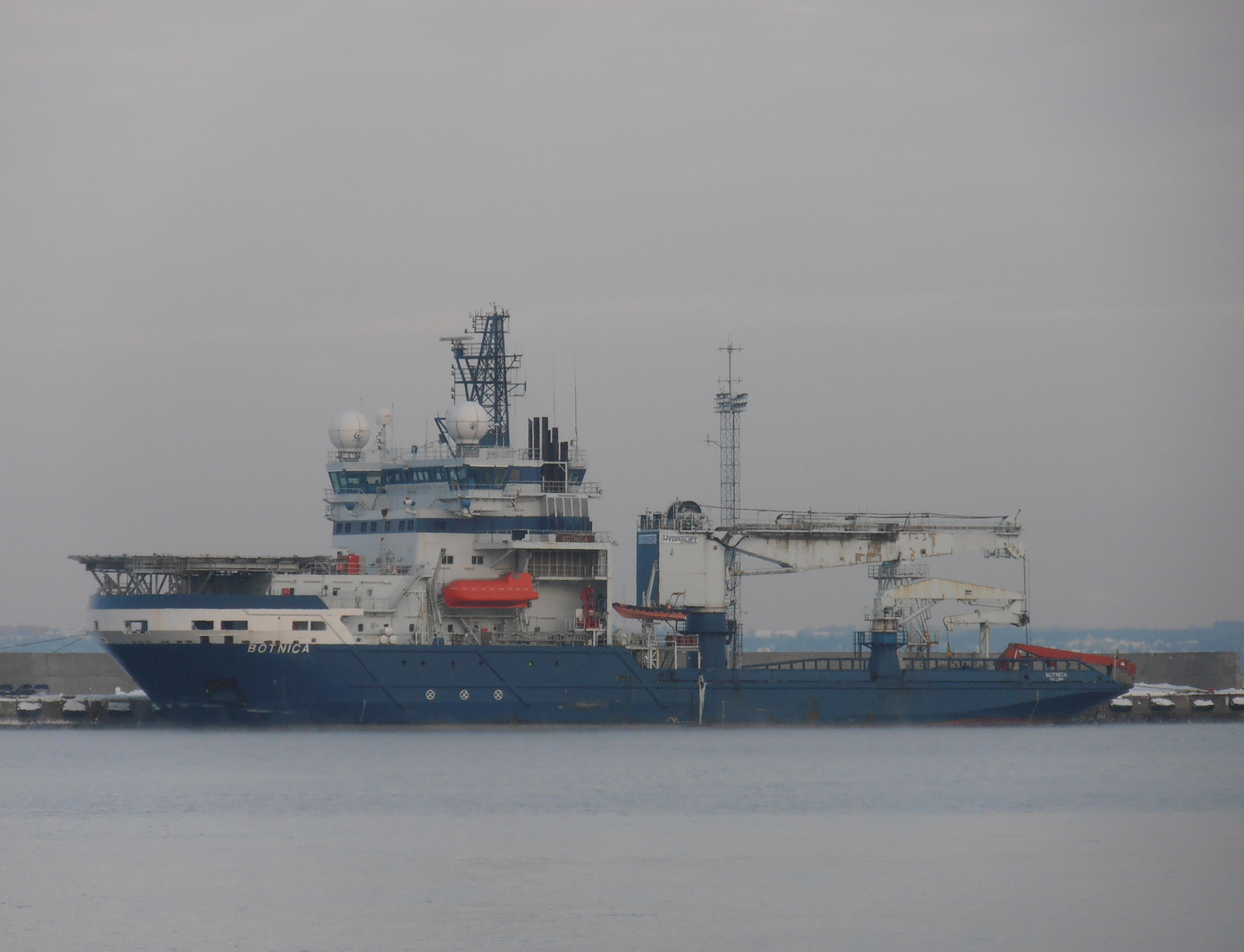
Baffinland chartered the Estonian multipurpose ice breaker Botnica.

On July 4, 2018, Baffinland contracted for the services of the large Estonian icebreaker MSV Botnica from a subsidiary of AS Tallinna Sadam, for the months July through October. The icebreaker provides "escort ice management services, oil spill and emergency response services".

=== Air transport ===
There is a 6,505 ft (1,983 m) runway at the Mary River mine site. (Note: Runways in Canada are measured in feet rather than metres) Baffinland workers are transported to and from the Mary River mine site by air. Workers based at Milne Inlet use ground transportation to reach the mine site. The Phase 2 proposal will be making use of the public airports at Arctic Bay, Clyde River, Sanirajak, Igloolik, and Pond Inlet—the five closest hamlets—and Iqaluit Airport to transport workers to and from worksites.

==== Mary River Aerodrome ====
In 2013, Nolinor Aviation began a service to Mary River Aerodrome carrying passengers and cargo on every second day from Region of Waterloo Airport via Iqaluit Airport using a Boeing 737, a 737-200 series combi aircraft equipped with a gravel kit for unpaved runways. The Mary River Aerodrome, having a medium length (6,505 ft [1,983 m]) gravel runway, was constructed adjacent to the base area. Flights are chartered by the mining company and operated by Chrono Aviation.

In March 2017 Baffinland chartered a massive Soviet-built Ilyushin Il-76 for twenty flights, between Jack Garland Airport, in North Bay, Ontario, and the mine-site. The mining vehicles were too large to be driven onto the plane, and had to be disassembled before shipment. North Bay's airport was selected because its 10,004 ft (3,049 m) main runway was adequate for the "heavy-laden Ilyushin to take off with a large payload of cargo and fuel".

=== Rail ===
==== South Railway ====
By 2007, the construction and operation of a "large-tonnage railway year-round in Arctic conditions...built on permafrost" was an ambitious part of the mining development plan. The South Railway was integral to the 2008 initial submission. However, by 2013 investment funds in mining had dried up as the price of iron ore had declined in 2012. Mary River project investors radically scaled back capital funds from CA$4 billion to CA$740 million, cancelling both the proposed South Railway and port development.

Baffinland's initial 2008 plans submitted to regulatory boards included a special cold-weather South Railway line from the mine-site to a newly built port in Steensby Inlet on the south shore of Baffin Island. (Note: The announcement of the potential new cold-weather railway line was of interest to Railway Gazette International enthusiasts who wrote extensively about this. In one July 24, 2008, article the author said that "Premium steel rails will not be used, because the material has an increased potential to fracture at very low temperatures. Regular carbon steel is preferred, with a very high premium on the cleanliness of the steel. For this project, a low-alloy rail with standard strength and a Brinell hardness in the range of 300 would be most appropriate.")

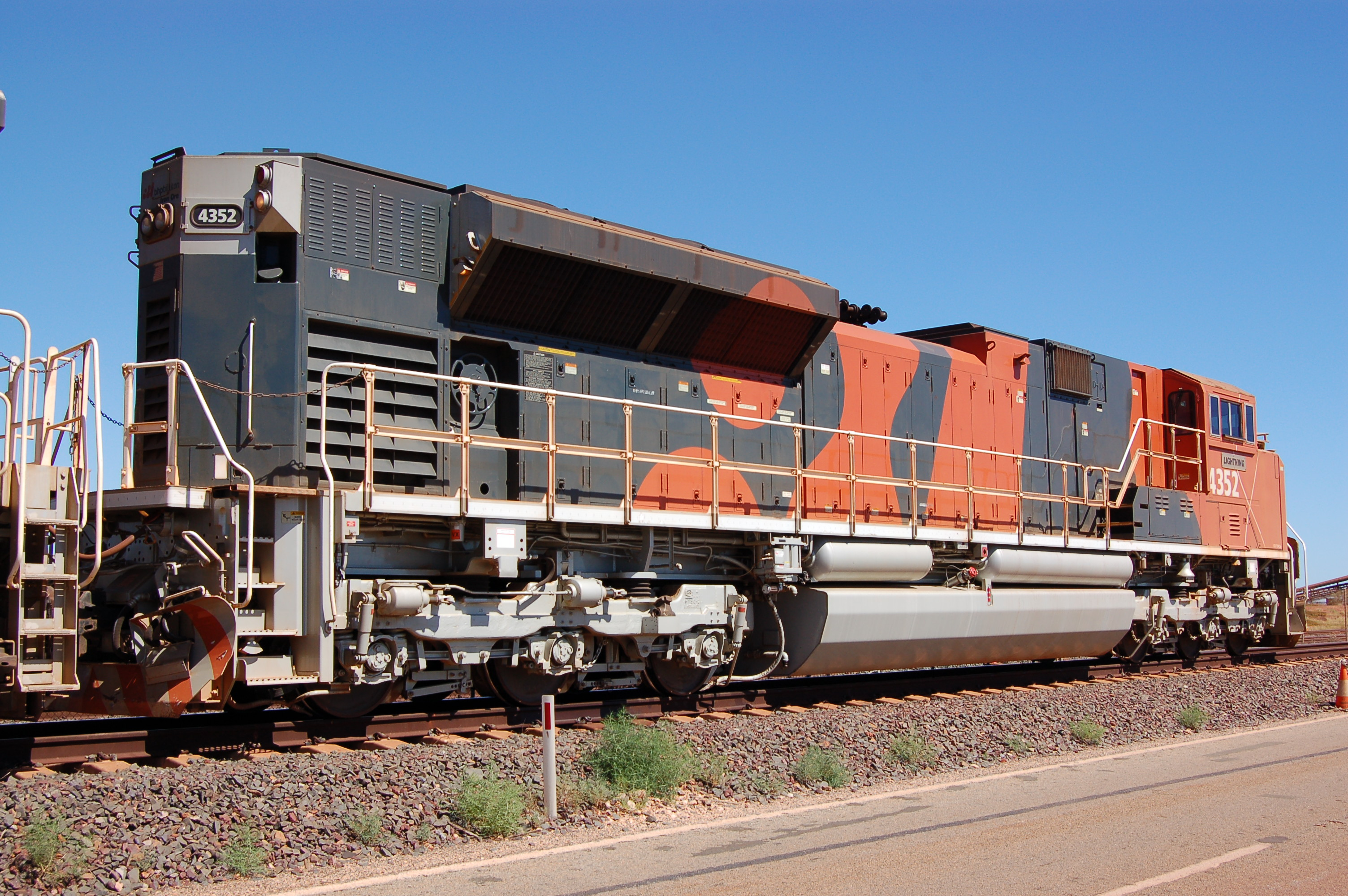
Baffinland has considered using diesel electric locomotives like this EMD SD70

Baffinland had considered using diesel electric locomotives like this EMD SD70 in their original 2008 plan.

In April 2011 the Nunatsiaq News online edition reported the railway was anticipated to cost CA$1.9 billion—just under half the entire CA$4 billion cost of constructing the mine.

This was described as more environmentally sensitive than a road route, cheaper to operate over the decades the mine will be in use, and a port in Steensby Inlet would be ice-free for eleven months—months longer than Milne Inlet. Ore would be warehoused at the port during the month the port was locked in ice.

The railway route had a higher initial capital cost than any plan to ship ore by truck, before it could ship any ore. But it was touted as being able to carry more ore than a roadway, for less per ton. Over the decades its higher initial cost would have been reclaimed several times over. The 149 km (93 mi) South Railway was said to be chosen, in part, because it would have been ice-free for a longer portion of the year.

According to Reuters this would have been the most northerly operational railroad in the world, the Baffinland mine being about a degree of latitude farther north than the Russian railhead in the Yamal Peninsula. (Note: Mining railways used to operate in the much more northerly Svalbard, but they appear to have been abandoned.)

A June 4, 2008, article in the Railway Gazette International described the construction challenges and logistics of a railway built on permafrost. Because Baffin Island's soil is permafrost, the route was chosen so it lies on rock, gravel, or large-grained sand as much as possible. Fine-grained sand and clay soils pose more of a heaving problem when the surface layer annually thaws and freezes. The route would have included five multi-span bridges totalling 1,400 m (4,600 ft) in length. Two tunnels 800 m (2,600 ft) and 250 m (820 ft) would have been required. The tunnels would have to be lined and insulated to make sure waste heat from the trains and summer air doesn't melt the permafrost surrounding the tunnel. The route detours around large areas of poorly drained glacial deposits and areas likely to contain deposits of fossil ice.

The rail line would have required 24 bridges in total and 300 culvert crossings. Seven of the bridges will be longer than 100 m (330 ft) Much of the line will run on top of a 4 m (13 ft) embankment, which needs to be pierced by culverts so wild-life can cross under it.

It is planned to use older carbon steel alloys for the rails, instead of more modern, higher performance alloys, because these can become brittle at very low temperatures. The rails and bridges are designed for fifty years of active service.

Construction of the rail line would have required the opening of four quarries.

Concerns had been raised about the negative impact the original 2008 special cold-weather railway line the South Railway would have had on migrating caribou. There were also concerns about the impact of the frequent passages of the big ice-breaking freighters on sea mammals.

A May 2012 CBC North article said that archaeologist Sylvie LeBlanc Carleton University was concerned that the South Railway route would parallel the longest line of ancient inuksuit (Inuit navigation sculptures) yet found over a line 6 km (3.7 mi). Some of the inuksuit date back 4500 years. The chain runs from Steensby Inlet to 10 km Lake, a distance of 6 km (3.7 mi). LeBlanc described the uninterrupted chain of inuksuit as unprecedented in length and historical value. LeBlanc registered her concern with the Nunavut Impact Review Board that explosions necessary to build the rail line will trigger vibrations which will damage the inuksuit. An internal Baffinland environmental impact study had said that there should be a "buffer distance" between the site of any blasting and sites of archaeologically significant structures—but the study didn't specify what the distance was.

==== North railway ====
In February 2016, Baffinland requested permission for another major change in Phase 2. In Phase 2, 4.2 million tons per year of iron ore was to be trucked on tote road to Milne Inlet. In 2015 Baffinland requested permission to truck 12 million tons to Milne Inlet. Nunavut authorities informed Baffinland that a change of that scale would require an additional extensive environmental review. Six months later Baffinland announced that they would build a northern railway line running adjacent to the tote road to transport the iron ore to Milne Inlet. Baffinland already had the license to ship 18 million tons of ore to Steensby Inlet on the South Railway.

In a September 2017 Surface Transportation Board (STB) document, Baffinland entered into a memorandum of agreement with GE Industrial Financing Solutions, LLC, to purchase 4 GE Evolution Series locomotives. (Note: In July 2008, the Railway Gazette had reported that Baffinland planned to purchase three train sets, each containing 64 hopper cars, which will each make two round trips per day. In April 2011, Nunatsiaq News reported that the two diesel locomotives per train-set would be called upon to lead trains containing 100 to 130 hopper cars. The Railway Gazette reported that EMD SD70 and GE Dash-9 were candidates for the lines' locomotives. Initial plans included running a personnel train several times per week. Later plans included building a permanent airstrip at the mine site.) The locomotives were built but never shipped, and were eventually sold to CPKC Railway.

===== Mary River - Milne Inlet tote road =====
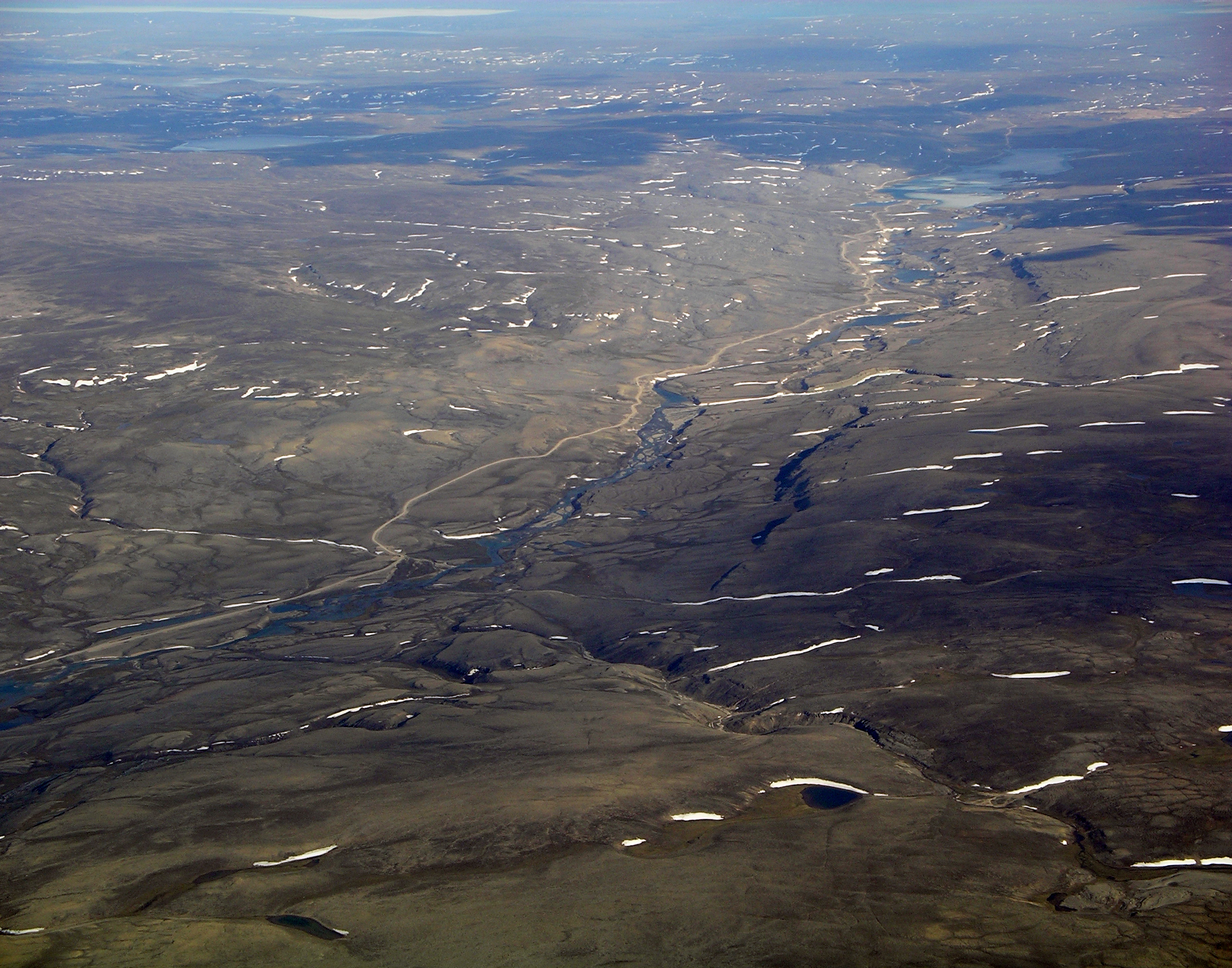
Road to Mary River

In 2010, when Nunavut Iron Ore Acquisition Company and ArcelorMittal were engaged in the bidding war, an alternate proposal to the South Railway cold-weather railway, was under consideration. By 2011, the projected cost of the South Railway had quadrupled from its 2006 estimate of CA$350 million. In this alternate proposal ore would be hauled by truck. The advantage to this approach would smaller start-up costs, and a shorter period before ore was shipped to market. Disadvantages were higher operating costs, making the price of a ton of ore approximately double that under the rail proposal, and a smaller capacity of ore, 3 million t (3.0 million long tons; 3.3 million short tons) per year, as opposed to the 20 million t (20 million long tons; 22 million short tons) per year under the rail proposal. Jowdat Waheed and Murray's Nunavut Iron Ore Acquisition Company suggested it would be cheaper to construct a tote road route from Mary River Mine to Milne Inlet, rather than the more expensive but more environmentally sensitive South Railway cold-weather railway. The tote road approach seemed to have been abandoned temporarily, when the Nunavut Iron and ArcelorMittal agreed to a partnership. In late 2014, after the South Railway had spent several years undergoing its environmental impact assessment, the railway plan was shelved.

Just after Baffinland had been acquired jointly by NIO and ArcelorMittal, Baffinland said in a January 13, 2011, release that if the company hauled ore with trucks on a "tote road" option instead of the railway, it "could begin producing 1 million tonnes of lump and fine iron ore by 2013." (Note: 1 million t (0.98 million long tons; 1.1 million short tons)) The statement said that the company could increase output to 3 million t (3.0 million long tons; 3.3 million short tons) in 2014—a level the site could sustain for twenty years. While the road would initially be less expensive, the "over-the-road option would slash output and cause operating costs to balloon", according to a 2011 Reuters article.

In early 2013, Baffinland had announced changes to its proposal for the Mary River project. This resulted in the call for a new NIRB assessment with more public hearings as the changes are outside existing regulations.

Between January 2013 and August 2015, the price of ore, per dry metric tonne, dropped from $152 to just over US$50. In 2014, Baffinland said that, due to a drop in ore prices, the South Railway was no longer economically viable, and they would use the "tote road" option.

Just a year after they had completed the first NIRB assessment and received their licenses, Baffinland requested a major amendment use ultra-large dump trucks to convey the ore from Mary River on the 100 km (62 mi) "tote road", which had already been built to a replacement port at Milne Inlet near Pond Inlet.

By February 18, 2016, Baffinland Iron Mines postponed its NIRB environmental review phase 2 submission until September as it wanted to make a major change—they want to replace the Mary River-Milne Inlet tote road with a railway, the North Railway. They already have authorization to construct the South Railway.

In Baffinland's amended project design, annual production would be only 4 million t (3.9 million long tons; 4.4 million short tons) of ore, carried to port by truck. Ore is currently shipped over a "tote road"—a dirt road wide enough for Baffinland's massive 200 ton dump trucks. Baffinland claims that, when its amended project design was approved it set a lower threshold to reach, before it could begin clawing back advance royalties.

In the early morning of December 16, 2018, a driver of a Caterpillar 745C articulated truck was killed while hauling iron ore along the tote road.

== Revenues and expenses ==
Baffinland operates on investments, not revenues from iron production and sales, and according to a February 2021 report commissioned by Baffinland by Graeme Clinton for the NIRB assessment, the company has had a huge deficit since 2016. The investors who acquired the company in 2011, were attracted by the quality of the iron ore and the record high prices of iron ore. With the sharp decline in iron ore prices, investors are unwillingly to undertake capital intense projects such as the CA$5.7 billion South Railway.

According to the 2021 report, in 2016, BIMC shipped 2.7 million wet metric tons, earned revenues of CA$114 million, and had a "negative free cash flow" of about CA$91.5 million. In 2017, with a shipment of 4 million wet metric tons, they earned revenues of about CA$345 million, and had a record loss of about CA$161 million. In 2018, revenues totalled about CA$315.8 million with a shipment of 5 million wet metric tons and a loss of CA$47.5 million. In 2019, revenues amounted to about CA$10.5 million, shipments were approximately 5.9 million wet metric tons, with negative free cash of CA$10.5 million. Their Moody's Ratings June 2020 credit rating reflected financial concerns.

== Inuit birthright organizations ==
With the creation of Nunavut in 1999, new planning regions were identified and agencies were put into place. The Qikiqtaaluk Region, in northern Baffin Island, is part of the North Baffin Planning Region which is a triangular area in the Arctic Archipelago, that comprises approximately 1,500,000 km^{2} (580,000 sq mi). The region is sparsely populated with most residents living in five hamlets—the largest hamlet, which is also closest to Mary River Mine and the most impacted by the project is Pond Inlet. In June 2000, the North Baffin Regional Land Use Plan, which deals with deals with mineral exploration and production, among many other major area, was approved. It provides strategic direction for land and resource use in the North Baffin Planning Region.

According to the Nunavut Planning Commission (NPC), the Nunavut Settlement Area is the "largest jurisdiction in Canada" and is divided into three regions with twenty-five hamlets— the Qikiqtani region in Baffin (Qikiqtaaluk or Qikiqtani), Kivalliq, and Kitikmeot. As of the 2021 Canadian census the population of Nunavut was 36,858 and Inuit made up 84.3% of the total residents.

The Qikiqtani Inuit Association (QIA)—formerly known as the Baffin Region Inuit Association—the regional birthright organization that represents Inuit in the entire Qikiqtaaluk Region, which includes the north where Mary River Mine is located, and South Baffin where the capital Iqaluit is located. The Qikiqtani Inuit Association is the Designated Inuit Organization (DIO) under the Nunavut Land Claims Agreement (NLCA) responsible for managing Inuit-owned lands in the Qikiqtaaluk Region. The QIA has the authority to negotiate with BIMC on behalf of communities through an Inuit Impact Benefit Agreement (IIBA).

The Inuit Impact and Benefit Agreement (IIBA) "outlines benefits Inuit are to receive for Baffinland using Inuit-owned land".

The Nunavut Impact Review Board (NIRB)—composed of nine members—"assesses the environmental and socio-economic impacts of development projects and advises the federal and territorial governments on whether they should go ahead".

== Mary River Inuit Impact and Benefit Agreement (IIBA) ==
On September 6, 2013, the QIA and Baffinland signed an agreement in which Baffinland "promised to make advance royalty payments to QIA as part of the IIBA.

In 2016 the Qikiqtani Inuit Association announced it was planning to go to arbitration over a dispute over royalty payments from Baffinland. The dispute centres around Baffinland's obligation to pay advance royalties, until ore production reaches a threshold that marked the beginning of "intended commercial production". QIA said that, since 2015 Q1 Baffinland has failed to pay $1.25 million quarterly advance royalty payments as agreed upon in the Inuit Impact and Benefit Agreement (IIBA), which "outlines benefits Inuit are to receive for Baffinland using Inuit-owned land".

The QIA insists that "commercial production" was intended to mean 60 per cent of 18 million tonnes per year, the figure given in Baffinland's original project description and in the project certificate they received from the Nunavut Impact Review Board. (Note: 18 million t (18 million long tons; 20 million short tons))

— Qikiqtani Inuit Association, Nunatsiaq News

The Mary River Inuit Impact and Benefit Agreement (IIBA) requires Baffinland to pay advance royalties. Baffinland was to pay a total of CA$20 million in advance royalty payments as its contract with Nunavut evolved, and then further quarterly advance payments, until the beginning of "intended commercial production". According to Nunatsiaq News, "Baffinland was to have made advance payments to the QIA prior to the start of commercial production equal to the following: CA$5 million on the date of signing of the IIBA, CA$5 million within five days of receiving a water license, CA$10 million within five days of the date of its construction decision, and CA$1.25 million for each calendar quarter between the construction decision and the start of commercial production." After the beginning of commercial production, Baffinland was to pay royalties of 1.19 of its net sales revenue. During its first three years of commercial production, Baffinland was to claw back the advance royalties.

Hearings on the Baffinland-QIA royalties dispute began on April 18, 2017. QIA said that either Baffinland did not make any of those quarterly advance royalty payments, or stopped making them in 2015. Its position is that "intended commercial production" began in 2015, because it shipped its first ore to market in August 2015. The position of the Qikiqtani Inuit Association is that the threshold for "intended commercial production", which should mark when Baffinland's production reached sixty percent of the production of 18 million t (18 million long tons; 20 million short tons) a year Baffinland agreed to, in its 2012 project certificate agreement with Nunavut. The 2012 project certificate agreement was based on the project design where Baffinland would complete the South Railway carry 18 million t (18 million long tons; 20 million short tons) of ore to Steensby Inlet. But in 2013, Baffinland said that a decline in the price of ore caused it to amend the project design and to delay the construction of the South Railway.

The three-member arbitration board consists of Thomas R. Berger, a retired judge and former Royal Commissioner of the Mackenzie Valley Pipeline Inquiry and highly respected by Indigenous Canadians, Jim McCartney and Murray Smith.

By 2016, the number of beneficiaries of the Nunavut Land Claims Agreement who worked at the Mary River Mine had decreased since IIBA was signed. IIBA beneficiaries worked only 17 or 18% of the "person-hours worked at the mine". According to a 2016, Nunatsiaq News article, Baffinland's enrolment of Inuit workers had been disappointing, and fell short of the stated agreements. By 2021, Baffinland's Mary River project had provided employment to fewer than 100 Inuit from local communities impacted by the mine, and had hired hundreds of non-Inuit who were flown into work camps. The demographics of the Qikiqtaaluk Region includes a population that is predominately Inuit, and has a mixed economy—including both traditional subsistence and wage-based activities.

== Opposition ==
=== Oil leaks in 2008 ===
The CBC interviewed Inuit from the region in April 2008, about their concerns with the plans. Jaypetee Palluq, an Igloolik resident who had been asked to serve on a Baffinland advisory committee, was concerned that the mine's operation would interfere with the traditional hunts for sea mammals, like walrus. He called on Baffinland to "find an alternate shipping route to the mine, regardless of the cost." Paul Quassa, Mayor of Igloolik, also expressed concern, over the effect of freighters on the ice used by the walrus. He said the region was known for its highly prized aged, fermented walrus meat, a valuable export from the region.

In June 2008, "about 5,000 litres of jet fuel had "leaked out of a containment bladder in the mine site's tank farm at Milne Inlet. The fuel collected in sand sitting in an impermeable liner designed to keep spills from being released into the environment." (Note: 5,000 L (1,100 imp gal; 1,300 US gal)) In August 2008, the CBC reported that Baffinland had acknowledged three fuel spills.

Baffinland's then vice-president of sustainable development, Derek Chubb, asserted that the three spills were contained within "secondary engineered containment facilities", and that there was no environmental damage. 5,000 litres (1,100 imperial gallons; 1,300 US gallons) of aviation fuel leaked from a fuel bladder at the mine's port facilities on Milne Inlet. The other two leaks of 200 L (44 imp gal; 53 US gal), occurred near the mine site.

Baffinland acknowledged that the leaks had been found months earlier, but had not been made public. Michael Nadler, the regional director general of the Department of Indian and Northern Affairs speculated that mine officials may not have felt an obligation to publicly report the leaks because they believed there had been no damage.

The fourth spill in the summer of 2008 of 100,000 L (22,000 imp gal; 26,000 US gal) contaminated, oily and greasy water, had occurred on September 22, 2008. Someone had released the contaminated water in a ditch a "few hundred metres away" from Baffinland's Milne Inlet fuel storage tank (fuel depot), which is lined to prevent seepage". This was reported by officials as a "human error". Baffinland acknowledged that the leaks had been found months earlier, but had not been made public. Michael Nadler, the regional director general of the Department of Indian and Northern Affairs speculated that mine officials may not have felt an obligation to publicly report the leaks because they believed there had been no damage.

=== Air strip and tote road blockade (2021) ===
From February 4 to 11, 2021, a small group of Inuit hunters held a peaceful protest blocking Mary River mine's airstrip and the tote road. The protesters, who called themselves Nuluujaat Land Guardians stood in opposition to the expansion of the mine, concerned for the damage to the environment and their traditional ways of life. About seven hundred employees were stuck at the mine work camp for a week. The protest ended with a proposal by the Mayor of Pond Inlet, that a meeting be convened in the near future between "protesters, community leaders, Premier Joe Savikataaq and Inuit organizations that represent Inuit in the area". Protesters asked that the QIA, and other birthright agencies, "commit to sharing more mine royalties with communities in the area". They said that they had not been given an opportunity to voice their concerns that the Phase 2 expansion "will drive caribou away and harm other wildlife in the area, including narwhal" at the hearings. Inuit in the Qikiqtaaluk Region in general, and in Pond Inlet in particular, depend on these animals for subsistence. In Pond Inlet, 92% of the population is Inuit and the economy there is a mixed economy—including both traditional subsistence and wage-based activities. The local Inuit have the right to harvest in the nearby protected areas of the Tallurutiup Imanga National Marine Conservation Area, Bylot Island and Sirmilik National Park, for which Pond Inlet is the gateway hamlet.

On February 10, Baffinland filed for an injunction against the protesters, claiming the blockade could have cost them over 14 million dollars, accounting for the food and housing the company provided to the employees who were stuck in the work camp during the blockade. Judge Susan Cooper granted Baffinland an interlocutory injunction on March 3, forbidding protesters from returning to the mine and from impeding the obstructing the tote road and air strip, and empowering the RCMP to remove them if they did. The injunction will remain in place until a court action filed by Baffinland against the protesters "alleging trespass, nuisance and interference with economic interests" is settled in Nunavut court.

== COVID-19 outbreak ==
On May 2, 2021, Baffinland announced that COVID-19 was spreading in its work camp. An outbreak was declared the following day. The outbreak reportedly began with an employee testing positive on April 19. Within two months, the mine became the site of Canada's worst outbreak of the SARS-CoV-2 Delta variant, a highly transmissible variant of the virus that causes COVID-19. As of June 12, 106 people had tested positive for COVID-19 in the mine, with 96 of them testing positive for the Delta variant. The mine ceased operations on May 5, and over 1200 employees that were considered "low risk" began flying home, but many proved to be carrying the virus asymptomatically, and caused it to spread beyond the mine. In Ontario, 127 confirmed or "probable" cases have been linked to the mine, 10 of them of the lineage of the Delta variant; around 120 cases were similarly linked in Alberta, 9 of them with the Delta variant. While cases linked to employees of the mine were also reported in other provinces, since the mine's workforce had not been in contact with any local communities, Nunavut's health department reported no cases linked to the mine outbreak. The mine re-opened in a reduced capacity on May 28, and has reportedly had no new cases since May 29, and no active cases at the site since June 5. In June 2021, the Canadian Red Cross began assisting the mine with contact tracing efforts.

== See also ==
- Iron Ore Company of Canada
- Natural resources of the Arctic
