= Nordic Bulk Carrier =

Danish shipping company

Nordic Bulk Carriers is a Danish shipping firm that operates large bulk carriers in northern waters. The firm was founded in 2009 by Christian Bonfils and Mads Boye Petersen. Bonfils resigned in January 2015, and the firm was acquired by Pangaea Logistics Solutions.

== Firsts ==
According to The Globe and Mail, in 2010 the firm became the first non-Russian firm to send cargo vessels through Russia's Northern Sea Route.

In 2013 the firm's Nordic Orion was the first to carry coal from Canada's west coast, through the Northwest Passage, to Europe.

Their Panamax vessel, the Nordic Odin was the first vessel to carry iron ore from the large Baffinland Iron Mine through sea ice in August 2015.
