= David Iqaqrialu =

Canadian politician

MLA for Uqqummiut
- In office 1999–2004
- Preceded by: first member
- Succeeded by: James Arreak

Personal details
- Born: July 2, 1954 (age 71) Clyde River, Northwest Territories (now Nunavut)
- Party: non-partisan consensus government

David Iqaqrialu (born July 2, 1954) is a former territorial level politician from Clyde River, Northwest Territories (now Nunavut), Canada. He served as a member of the Nunavut Legislature from 1999 until 2004.

Iqaqrialu was first elected to the Nunavut Legislature in the 1999 Nunavut general election. He won the electoral district of Uqqummiut in a hotly contested three-way race defeating former Northwest Territories MLA's Tommy Enuaraq and Pauloosie Paniloo. He served a single term in the legislature as chair of the Committee of the Whole.

Iqaqrialu ran for re-election in the 2004 Nunavut general election but was badly defeated by James Arreak finishing sixth out of seventh. His popular vote evaporated with 74% since the last election swinging to other candidates.
