= Baffin Central =

Baffin Central (formerly Central Baffin) was an electoral district of the Northwest Territories, Canada. The district consisted of Pangnirtung, Cape Dyer, Broughton Island (Qikiqtarjuaq), Cape Hooper, Dewar Lakes and Clyde River.

The district was created under the name of Central Baffin in the 1975 Northwest Territories general election before it was renamed to Baffin Central in the 1979 Northwest Territories general election.

== Members of the Legislative Assembly ==
Name	Elected	Left Office
District created as Central Baffin
Ipeelee Kilabuk	1975	1979
District renamed to Baffin Central
James Arreak	1979	1980
Ipeelee Kilabuk	1980	1983
Pauloosie Paniloo	1983	1987
Ipeelee Kilabuk	1987	1991
Rebecca Mike	1991	1995
Tommy Enuaraq	1995	1999
District dissolved into Pangnirtung and Uqqummiut

== Election results ==
=== 1983 election ===
1983 Northwest Territories general election
Candidate	Votes	%
Pauloosie Paniloo	307	51.77%
Iola Metuq	286	48.23%
Total valid ballots / Turnout	593	75.52%
Rejected ballots	30	
Source(s) "Report of the Chief Electoral Officer on the General Election of Members to the Council of the Northwest Territories 1983" (PDF). Elections NWT. May 1984.

=== 1980 by-election ===
James Arreak resigned his seat on April 1, 1980. Election took place on September 15, 1980. Ipeelee Kilabuk regained his seat after losing to Arreak a year ago.

Northwest Territories territorial by-election, 1980
Candidate	Votes	%
Ipeelee Kilabuk	221	45.38%
Iola Metuq	154	31.62%
Stevie Audlakiak	112	23.00%
Total valid ballots / Turnout	487	64.27%
Rejected ballots	4	
Source(s) "Report of the Chief Electoral Officer on Federal By-Elections and By-Elections to the Council of the Northwest Territories Held in 1980" (PDF). Elections NWT. 1981.

=== 1979 election ===
1979 Northwest Territories general election
Candidate	Votes	%
James Arreak	194	36.19%
Ipeelee Kilabuk	183	34.14%
Stevie Audlakiak	159	29.67%
Total valid ballots / Turnout	536	70.05%
Rejected ballots	2	
Source(s) "REPORT OF THE CHIEF ELECTORAL OFFICER ON THE GENERAL ELECTION OF MEMBERS TO THE COUNCIL OF THE NORTHWEST TERRITORIES 1979" (PDF). Elections NWT. January 1980.

=== 1975 election ===
1975 Northwest Territories general election
Candidate	Votes	%
Ipeelee Kilabuk	236	47.39%
Bernadett Brintnell	111	22.29%
Oolahnee Dialla	88	17.67%
Jacopie Koksiak	63	12.65%
Total valid ballots / Turnout	498	71.65%
Rejected ballots	5	
Source(s) "REPORT OF THE CHIEF ELECTORAL OFFICER ON FEDERAL BY-ELECTIONS, BY-ELECTIONS TO THE COUNCIL OF THE YUKON TERRITORY, AND NORTHWEST TERRITORIES COUNCIL GENERAL ELECTIONS HELD IN 1975" (PDF). Information Canada. 1976.

== See also ==
- List of Northwest Territories territorial electoral districts
- List of Nunavut territorial electoral districts
