= Elisapee Enuaraq =

Inuk artist

- Born: 1955 (age 70–71)

Elisapee Enuaraq (born 1955) is an Inuk artist.

Enuaraq lives in Clyde River, Nunavut. Her work is included in the collections of the National Gallery of Canada, the Museum of Anthropology at the University of British Columbia and the Winnipeg Art Gallery.
