= Pauloosie Keyootak =

Canadian Inuk politician

Pauloosie Keyootak MLA

Member of the Legislative Assembly of Nunavut for Uqqummiut
- In office February 9, 2015 – September 20, 2021
- Preceded by: Samuel Nuqingaq
- Succeeded by: Mary Killiktee

Personal details
- Born: 1953 or 1954 (age 72–73)
- Party: non-partisan consensus government

Pauloosie Keyootak is a Canadian Inuk politician from Broughton Island, Northwest Territories, now Qikiqtarjuaq, Nunavut. He was elected to the Legislative Assembly of Nunavut, representing the electoral district of Uqqummiut, in a by-election on February 9, 2015. He won the by-election over Niore Iqalukjuak, who had been the second-place candidate behind Samuel Nuqingaq in the 2013 election, and former MLA James Arreak.

Keyootak is a resident of Qikiqtarjuaq. He was formerly a president of the Qikiqtani Inuit Association, who was removed from that position in 2000 for reportedly violating the organization's code of conduct, although the organization has never disclosed the nature of the alleged violation. He subsequently served on the municipal council in Qikiqtarjuaq, and on the board of directors of Arctic Co-op.

== Attempted travel to Pangnirtung ==
On March 22, 2016 Keyootak, his son and another adult, left Iqaluit by snowmobile for Pangnirtung. When they did not arrive, search and rescue teams from both Iqaluit and Pangnirtung were sent out on March 29. A specially equipped Lockheed C-130 Hercules of 413 Transport and Rescue Squadron based at CFB Greenwood was sent by the Joint Rescue Coordination Centre Halifax. In addition, a local Twin Otter with spotters were dispatched to assist with the search. Officials said that a CH-149 Cormorant along with a second Hercules, to relieve the first, had been dispatched. Ed Zebedee, emergency services coordinator for the Government of Nunavut, said that the search was the 5th of the Easter weekend and the 58th of the year. On March 31, the three were found alive 160 km (99 mi) south of Iqaluit, Pangnirtung is about 297 km (185 mi) north. They were spotted from the Twin Otter which landed near the travellers. The Twin Otter was damaged on landing and was unable to take off and a CH-149 Cormorant picked up the men.

== Electoral record ==
2017 Nunavut general election
Name	Vote	%
Pauloosie Keyootak	235	
Jerry Natanine	191	
Johnathan Palluq	118	

2015 By-election
Name	Vote	%
Pauloosie Keyootak	220	42.3%
Niore Iqalukjuak	195	37.5%
James Arreak	105	20.2%
Total Valid Ballots	520	100%
Voter Turnout 70.5%	Rejected Ballots 0	
