= Qikiqtaaluk =

Island in Nunavut, Canada

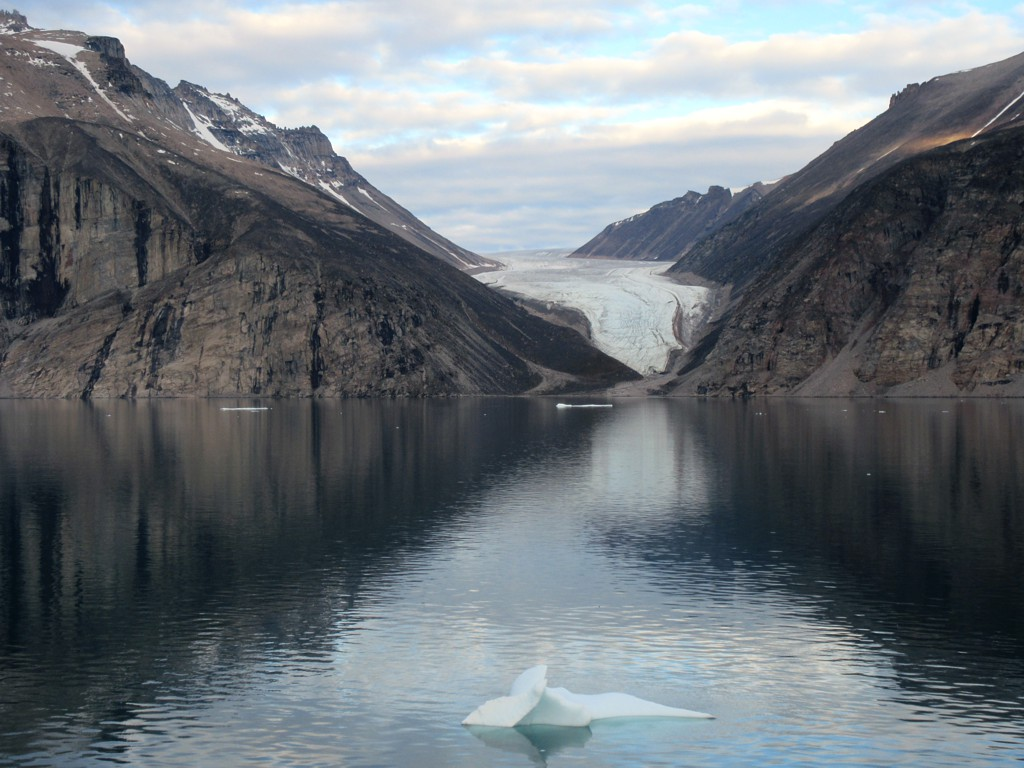
- Qikiqtaaluk from Gibbs Fjord in summer

- Location within Nunavut Location within Canada

Geography
- Location: Northern Canada
- Coordinates: 70°56′50″N 71°49′12″W
- Archipelago: Arctic Archipelago
- Area: 482 km^{2} (186 sq mi)
- Highest point: 1,590 m (5,220 ft)

Administration
- Canada
- Territory: Nunavut
- Region: Qikiqtaaluk

Demographics
- Population: Uninhabited

Qikiqtaaluk (Inuktitut syllabics: ᕿᑭᖅᑖᓗᒃ) formerly Sillem Island is an uninhabited island in the Qikiqtaaluk Region of Nunavut, Canada. It is the second largest (after Bylot Island) of the several hundred islands and islets that are located in Baffin Bay, immediately off the northern coast of Baffin Island. It is defined by Clark and Gibbs Fiords, which join at its northern end to form Scott Inlet. Further north lies Pilattuaq.

== Geography ==
Qikiqtaaluk has an area of 482 km^{2} (186 sq mi). The highest peak of the island reaches 1,590 m (5,220 ft).

== Popular culture ==
Qikiqtaaluk was the location for the fictional Barbeau Observatory in the film The Midnight Sky.
