= James Arreak =

Canadian politician (born 1952)

MLA for Baffin Central, NT
- In office 1979–1980
- Preceded by: Ipeelee Kilabuk
- Succeeded by: Ipeelee Kilabuk

MLA for Uqqummiut, NU
- In office 2004–2013
- Preceded by: David Iqaqrialu
- Succeeded by: Samuel Nuqingaq

Personal details
- Born: October 6, 1952 (age 73) Clyde River
- Party: non-partisan consensus government

James Arreak (born October 6, 1952) is a territorial and municipal level politician in Northern Canada. He has served as a member of both the Nunavut and Northwest Territories legislatures.

== Biography ==
Arreak is from Clyde River, Nunavut, Canada.

Arreak was elected to the Northwest Territories Legislature in the 1979 Northwest Territories general election. He won the Baffin South electoral district defeating incumbent Ipeelee Kilabuk. He left the legislature less than a year later in 1980.

He was the Member of the Legislative Assembly (MLA) for the electoral district of Uqqummiut having won the seat in the 2004 Nunavut election. In June 2006 he was appointed deputy speaker for the Legislative Assembly.

In 2008 he was elected Speaker of the Legislative Assembly of Nunavut. He resigned from this position in November 2010 to become Minister of Culture, Language, Elders, and Youth and Minister of Languages in the Cabinet of Nunavut. He was replaced as Speaker by former premier Paul Okalik.

Arreak was at one time mayor of Clyde River.
