= Akitiq Sanguya =

Inuk sculptor

- Born: July 1, 1935 (age 91); Nunavut

Akitiq Sanguya (1935) is an Inuk sculptor from Clyde River/Kangiqtugaapik.

Her work is included in the collections of the Musée national des beaux-arts du Québec and the Winnipeg Art Gallery (on loan from Government of Nunavut Fine Art Collection).

== Introduction ==
Akitiq Sanguya is an Inuk artist from Clyde River, located in the east of Canada's largest island, Baffin Island. Inuit artists like Akitiq have become an integral part in the preservation of their culture and beliefs. In addition, art allows Akitiq to support herself while portraying her Inuit culture.

Alternative names: Sanguya Sanguya, Sangooyak Sanguya, Akitil Sanguya, Akitik Sanguya

== Akitiqs Sanguya's artwork ==
Akitiq Sanguya has many different artistic mediums. However, her soapstone sculptures are what she is best known for. Her artwork is done traditionally, using techniques like the axe and file and polishing by hand, with materials used for generations by the Inuit. Her artwork often depicts people and animals which are believed to have a strong balanced relationship in the Inuit culture.

By the 1960s fine Inuit art was being pushed toward southern markets. This was in an attempt to build the self-sufficiency of the Inuit. Most of the art was done traditionally and featured cultural aspects of the Inuit within them.

=== Dolls ===
Akitiq usually creates dolls that depict aspects of Inuit culture and their relationship with animals. Her dolls are usually made of stone and the human ones are properly fashioned in different Inuit clothing made from animal fur. Not only did this art provide her with money but she is also able to represent her culture through her artwork.

=== Subsist ===
Featured in the Winnipeg Art Gallery from November 2019 to May 2020. Subsist is a collection of works from a multitude of indigenous artists. The collaboration symbolizes the degeneration of their culture from global capitalism and colonialism.

== Other activities ==
=== Lessons ===
In 2016 Akitiq taught a three-week course on traditional Inuit sewing techniques. Made possible by the local non profit group the Ilisaqsivik Society elder committee. The class taught students how to make kamiks which are traditional Inuit footwear composed of animal hides.

=== Advocacy ===
The Truth Commission is an organization established by the Canadian government to uncover and record human rights violations and exploitations that occurred throughout the country's past. Each region usually has their own Truth Commission which allows for an in depth analysis of the communities past. The commission aims to stop these kinds of atrocities from occurring again by bringing awareness and identifying the causes and perpetrators of these offenses.

=== Qikitqani Truth Commission ===
In the early 2000s, Inuit from the Qikiqtani Inuit Association and Makivik Corporation of Nunavik called upon the Canadian government to create the Qikitqani Truth Commission. This commission would investigate colonial practices, including forced relocation, cultural assimilation and the RCMP dog killings.

Akitiq Sanguya also contributed to the Qikitqani Truth commission by describing instances of violence against Qimmiit (sled dogs). A recording captures the interview where she explains an instance where a Royal Canadian Mounted Police (RCMP) officer and an Inuk constable attempted to kill a group of dogs in her family's spring camp before being stopped by their owner. She also provided information about the experiences of Pauloosie Panalak a now-deceased acquaintance. Akitiq relays the story about Pauloosie losing all of his 16 dogs to this violence against Qimmits carried out by the Canadian Government. After Pauloosie returned from a quick supply run he encountered all his dogs murdered while still being tied down with his sled. This resulted in the displacement of Pauloosie who was not able to return to his home camp.

== Present day ==
Today, Akitiq Sanguya still practices her art. After the covid-19 pandemic, Akitikq is once again having her art displayed. In the summer of 2022, Akitiq will be featured amongst other Inuit artists at the Winnipeg Art Gallery. The exhibition, Kakiniit/Hivonighijotaa: Inuit Embodied Practices and Meanings, uses traditional Inuit tattooing and its connections to Shamanism to explore indigenous cultural reclamation and Inuit identity. Kakiniit (Inuit traditional tattoos) are important to the Inuit identity and were once prohibited by missionaries. However, in recent years there has been a revitalization of Kakinniit and their importance to the Inuit.
