= Tommy Enuaraq =

Canadian politician

Tommy Enuaraq is a published author and former territorial level politician from Clyde River, Nunavut, Canada.

He wrote a children's book Who's Going to Eat Me? (ISBN 1-55036242-9). The book was published by Nortex in 1991. Enuaraq ran for a seat in the Northwest Territories Legislature in the 1995 Northwest Territories general election. He won election in the electoral district of Baffin Central. Enuaraq ran for a seat in the Legislative Assembly of Nunavut after Nunavut was carved from the Northwest Territories in 1999. He was defeated in the new electoral district of Uqqummiut by David Iqaqrialu finishing second.

Legislative Assembly of the Northwest Territories
Preceded by Rebecca Mike	MLA Baffin Central; 1995-1999	Succeeded by District Abolished
