= Uqqummiut =

Territorial electoral district in Nunavut, Canada

Coordinates: 70.538°N 69.172°W

Nunavut electoral district
- Boundaries of Uqqummiut

Territorial electoral district
- Legislature: Legislative Assembly of Nunavut
MLA
Gordon Kautuk
- District created: 1999
- First contested: 1999
- Last contested: 2025

Uqqummiut (Inuktitut: ᐅᕐᒃᑯᒻᒥᐅᑦ, Inuinnaqtun: Uqqurmiut) is a territorial electoral district (riding) for the Legislative Assembly of Nunavut, Canada. The riding consists of the communities of Clyde River and Qikiqtarjuaq.

The Member of the Legislative Assembly was Samuel Nuqingaq. On 24 October 2014, he was expelled for the legislature and the seat became vacant with a by-election to be held within six months. The by-election was held 9 February 2015 and Pauloosie Keyootak of Qikiqtarjuaq was elected.

== Members of the Legislative Assembly ==
† by-election

| Parliament | Years | Member |
|---|---|---|
| 1st | 1999–2004 | David Iqaqrialu |
| 2nd | 2004–2008 | James Arreak |
| 3rd | 2008–2013 | James Arreak |
| 4th | 2013–2015 | Samuel Nuqingaq |
| 4th† | 2015–2017 | Pauloosie Keyootak |
| 5th | 2017–2021 | Pauloosie Keyootak |
| 6th | 2021–2025 | Mary Killiktee |
| 7th | 2025–present | Gordon Kautuk |

== Election results ==
=== 2025 election ===
2025 Nunavut general election
| Candidate | Votes | % |
|---|---|---|
| Gordon Kautuk | 402 | 75.3 |
| Mary Killiktee | 132 | 24.7 |
| Total valid ballots | | 540 |
| Rejected ballots | | 6 |
| Turnout | | 62.14% |

=== 2021 election ===
2021 Nunavut general election
| Candidate | Votes | % |
|---|---|---|
| Mary Killiktee | 261 | 63.8 |
| Sheila Enook | 148 | 36.2 |
| Total valid ballots | | 409 |
| Rejected ballots | | 1 |
| Turnout | | 46.6% |

=== 2017 election ===
2017 Nunavut general election
| Candidate | Votes | % |
|---|---|---|
| Pauloosie Keyootak | 235 | 43.2 |
| Jerry Natanine | 191 | 35.1 |
| Johnathan Palluq | 118 | 21.7 |
| Total valid ballots | | 544 |
| Rejected ballots | | 12 |
| Turnout | | 66.43% |

=== 2015 by-election ===
2015 Nunavut general election
| Candidate | Votes | % |
|---|---|---|
| Pauloosie Keyootak | 220 | 42.3 |
| Niore Iqalukjuak | 195 | 37.5 |
| James Arreak | 105 | 20.2 |
| Total valid ballots | | 520 |
| Rejected ballots | | 0 |
| Turnout | | 70.5% |

=== 2013 election ===
After the original count both Samuel Nuqingaq and Niore Iqalukjuak were tied with 187 votes each. A recount was held November 5 and Nuqingaq was declared elected with 187 while Iqalukjuak had 185.

2013 Nunavut general election
| Candidate | Votes | % |
|---|---|---|
| Samuel Nuqingaq | 187 | 36.7 |
| Niore Iqalukjuak | 185 | 36.3 |
| Loseosie Paneak | 62 | 12.2 |
| Apiusie Apak | 49 | 9.6 |
| Charlie Kalluk | 26 | 5.1 |
| Total valid ballots | | 509 |
| Rejected ballots | | 2 |
| Turnout | | 77.9% |

=== 2008 election ===
2008 Nunavut general election
| Candidate | Votes | % |
|---|---|---|
| James Arreak | 218 | 40.4 |
| Loasie Audlakiak | 212 | 39.3 |
| Igah Hainnu | 110 | 20.4 |
| Total valid ballots | | 540 |
| Rejected ballots | | 1 |
| Turnout | | 84.93% |

=== 2004 election ===
2004 Nunavut general election
| Candidate | Votes | % |
|---|---|---|
| James Arreak | 148 | 26.87 |
| Phoebe Palluq Hainnu | 102 | 18.65 |
| Samuel Nuqingaq | 83 | 15.17 |
| Stevie Audlakiak | 79 | 14.44 |
| Lootie Toomasie | 66 | 12.07 |
| David Iqaqrialu | 60 | 10.97 |
| Peter Iqalukjuak | 9 | 1.83 |
| Total valid ballots | | 547 |
| Rejected ballots | | 2 |
| Turnout | | 90.42% |

=== 1999 election ===
1999 Nunavut general election
| Candidate | Votes | % |
|---|---|---|
| David Iqaqrialu | 232 | 42.80 |
| Tommy Enuaraq | 187 | 34.50 |
| Pauloosie Paniloo | 123 | 22.70 |
| Total valid ballots | | 542 |
| Rejected ballots | | 1 |
| Turnout | | 83.28% |

== See also ==
- List of Nunavut territorial electoral districts
- Canadian provincial electoral districts
