= Pilattuaq =

Island in Nunavut, Canada

- Location within Nunavut Location within Canada

Geography
- Location: Northern Canada
- Coordinates: 71°06′36″N 71°10′30″W
- Archipelago: Arctic Archipelago
- Highest elevation: 365 m (1198 ft)

Administration
- Canada
- Territory: Nunavut
- Region: Qikiqtaaluk

Demographics
- Population: Uninhabited

Pilattuaq (Inuktitut syllabics: ᐱᓚᑦᑐᐊᖅ) formerly Scott Island is an uninhabited island in the Qikiqtaaluk Region of Nunavut, Canada. It is located in Baffin Bay, off the eastern coast of Baffin Island, in the middle of Scott Inlet, north of the confluence of Clark Fiord and Gibbs Fiord which embrace Qikiqtaaluk.

Another, much smaller Scott Island lies off the southwest coast of Baffin Island, near the mouth of Keltie Inlet.

== Geography ==
The island's steep and rugged cliffs reach up to 365 m (1,198 ft) [above sea level. It is approximately 11 km (6.8 mi) in length.

One of the most notable formations on the island is The Ship's Prow, a 600 m (2,000 ft) overhanging granite wall, first climbed by Mike Libecki in the spring of 1999.

== Fauna ==
Glaucous gull and northern fulmar frequent its cliffs and shoreline.
