= Rebecca Mike =

Canadian politician

Rebecca Mike (1951 or 1952 – November 14, 2025) was a territorial level politician from Pangnirtung, Nunavut.

Mike was elected to the Northwest Territories Legislature in the 1991 Northwest Territories general election. She won the Baffin Central electoral district defeating incumbent Ipeelee Kilabuk and former MLA Pauloosie Paniloo. Mike was appointed to the cabinet, serving until February 1995 when she was forced to resign her portfolios, after she filed an assault complaint in January 1995. Mike attended a Christmas party in December 1994, she alleged she was assaulted by a businessman. Mike did not return to the Legislature in 1995.

Mike died in Ottawa, Ontario after a short illness on November 14, 2025, aged 73.

Legislative Assembly of the Northwest Territories
Preceded by Ipeelee Kilabuk	MLA Baffin Central; 1991-1995	Succeeded by Tommy Enuaraq
