= Ipeelee Kilabuk =

Canadian politician

Ipeelee Kilabuk (1932–2000) was a territorial level politician from Pangnirtung, Northwest Territories (now Nunavut), Canada.

Kilabuk was first elected to the Northwest Territories Legislature in the 1975 Northwest Territories general election. He ran for re-election in the 1979 Northwest Territories general election but was defeated by James Arreak. Arreak would last less than a year in office before resigning and Kilibuk returned to the legislature in a by-election held in September 1980. He would run for office again in the 1983 Northwest Territories general election but would be defeated for the second time by Pauloosie Paniloo. Paniloo and Kilabuk would face each other again in the 1987 Northwest Territories general election. This time Kilabuk would defeat Paniloo to win his third term in office. He would be defeated again at the end of his third term in the 1991 Northwest Territories general election.

Kilabuk died in March 2000 of a heart attack.

Legislative Assembly of the Northwest Territories
Preceded by New District	MLA Central Baffin; 1975-1979	Succeeded by James Arreak
Preceded by James Arreak	MLA Baffin Central; 1980-1983	Succeeded by Pauloosie Paniloo
Preceded by Pauloosie Paniloo	MLA Baffin Central; 1987-1991	Succeeded by Rebecca Mike
