= Mary Killiktee =

Canadian politician

Member of the Legislative Assembly of Nunavut for Uqqummiut
- In office November 19, 2021 – October 27, 2025
- Preceded by: Pauloosie Keyootak
- Succeeded by: Gordon Kautuk

Personal details
- Party: non-partisan consensus government

Mary Killiktee is a Canadian Inuk politician, who was elected to the Legislative Assembly of Nunavut in the 2021 Nunavut general election. She represented the electoral district of Uqqummiut until her defeat in 2025.

Prior to her election to the legislature, she was mayor of Qikiqtarjuaq.

== Electoral Record ==
2025 Nunavut general election: Uqqummiut
Candidate	Votes	%
Gordon Kautuk	402	75.3
Mary Killiktee	132	24.7
Total valid ballots		540
Rejected ballots		6
Turnout		62.14%

2021 Nunavut general election: Uqqummiut
Candidate	Votes	%
Mary Killiktee	261	63.8
Sheila Enook	148	36.2
Total valid ballots		409
Rejected ballots		1
Turnout		46.6%
