= Gordon Kautuk =

Canadian politician

Gordon Kautuk MLA

Member of the Legislative Assembly of Nunavut for Uqqummiut
- Incumbent
- Assumed office October 27, 2025
- Preceded by: Mary Killiktee

Personal details
- Party: Non-partisan consensus government

Gordon Kautuk is a Canadian politician, who was elected to the Legislative Assembly of Nunavut in the 2025 Nunavut general election. He represents the electoral district of Uqqummiut. Kautuk is a councillor for Clyde River.

== Electoral Record ==
2025 Nunavut general election: Uqqummiut
Candidate	Votes	%
Gordon Kautuk	402	75.3
Mary Killiktee	132	24.7
Total valid ballots		540
Rejected ballots		6
Turnout		62.14%
