= Clyde River Airport =

Airport in Nunavut, Canada

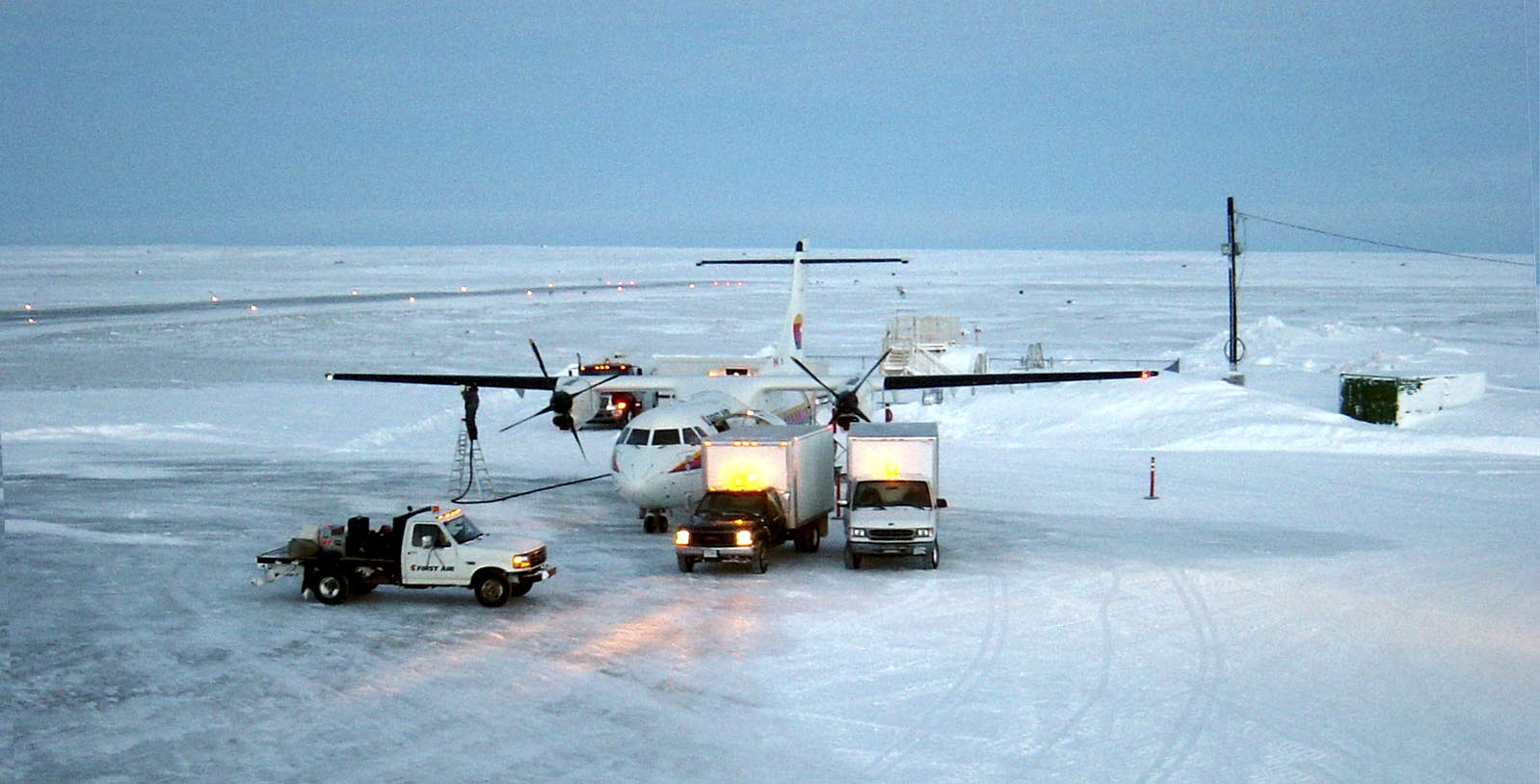
- Ramp and runway at Clyde River
- IATA: YCY; ICAO: CYCY; WMO: 71090

Summary
- Airport type: Public
- Operator: Government of Nunavut
- Location: Clyde River, Nunavut
- Time zone: EST (UTC−05:00)
  - Summer (DST): EDT (UTC−04:00)
- Elevation AMSL: 87 ft / 27 m
- Coordinates: 70°29′09″N 068°31′01″W

Map
- Location in Nunavut CYCY (Canada)

Runways
Direction	Length		Surface
Direction	ft	m	Surface
02/20	3,501	1,067	Gravel

Statistics (2010)
- Aircraft movements: 480
- Sources: Canada Flight Supplement; Movements from Statistics Canada; Environment Canada

Clyde River Airport (IATA: YCY, ICAO: CYCY) is located 2.2 nautical miles (4.1 km; 2.5 mi) northeast of Clyde River, Nunavut, Canada, and is operated by the government of Nunavut.

== Airlines and destinations ==
Airlines	Destinations
Canadian North	Iqaluit, Pangnirtung
