= Samuel Nuqingaq =

Canadian politician

MLA for Uqqummiut
- In office 2013 – October 24, 2014
- Preceded by: James Arreak
- Succeeded by: Pauloosie Keyootak

Personal details
- Party: non-partisan consensus government

Samuel Nuqingaq is a Canadian Inuk politician from Qikiqtarjuaq, Nunavut. He was elected to the Legislative Assembly of Nunavut in the 2013 election. He was expelled from the legislature in 2014.

== Political career ==
=== Election ===
Nuqinqaq ran for election in the electoral district of Uqqummiut which was one of two ridings to report a tie on election night in the 2013 election. In the original count of the ballots he was tied with Niore Iqalukjuak at 187 votes each. A recount was held November 5, 2013, and Nuqingaq was found to have 187 votes to Iqalukjuak's 185.

=== Suspension ===
Nuqingaq was suspended without pay from the legislature, including all caucus and committee meetings, on March 6, 2014 until the spring sitting. Earlier, he had been disciplined for missing two days of orientation and the beginning of the leadership forum. The suspension was extended through July 16 after being charged with assault and unlawfully being in a dwelling house. He spent much of the summer in Nova Scotia undergoing treatment for an alcohol addiction before returning to the legislature on September 22.

=== Expulsion ===
On 24 October 2014, Nunavut MLAs unanimously passed a motion to expel Nuqingaq, which vacated his seat immediately and forced a by-election. In moving the motion, Justice Minister Paul Okalik claimed that the legislature had spent too much time dealing with Nuqingaq's behaviour, and the public interest demanded his expulsion. He noted that Nuqingaq had been disciplined for "unacceptable conduct, including persistent absences from sittings of the House and meetings of its committees and caucuses without reasonable explanation."
