= Scott Inlet =

Inlet in the Qikiqtaaluk Region of Nunavut, Canada

Coordinates: 71°04′N 071°04′W

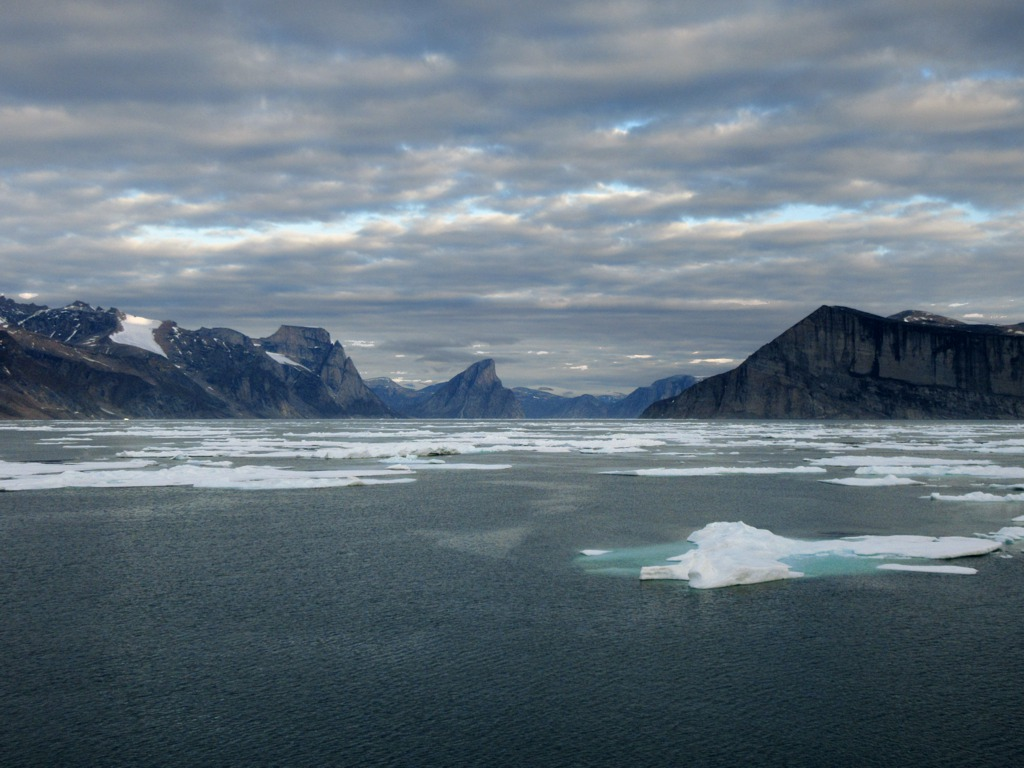
Scott Inlet near the mouth of Gibbs Fjord, Nunavut, Canada

Scott Inlet is a body of water in the Qikiqtaaluk Region of Nunavut, Canada. It is an arm of Baffin Bay. Scott Island lies in its middle. At its south end, it splits into Clark and Gibbs Fiords. The Inuit community of Clyde River is approximately 120 km (75 mi) to the southeast.

== Geography ==
The habitat is characterized by steep cliffs, mostly bare, those some have grassy-turfed ledges that rise on both sides. The elevation is 0 m (0 ft) above sea level.

== Fauna ==
Northern fulmars found here represent about 3.2% of the Canadian population. Breeding glaucous gulls represent about 1% of the Canadian population. This has earned the inlet and its surrounds, including Scott Island, a designation as an Important Bird Area (No. NU070), as well as Key Migratory Bird Terrestrial Habitat Site designation by the Canadian Wildlife Service. Polar bears, harp seals, ringed seal, and walrus frequent the area.
