= Pauloosie Paniloo =

Canadian politician

Pauloosie Paniloo (1943 Clyde River, Nunavut - April 20, 2007 200 km south of Clyde River, Nunavut) was a territorial level politician. He served as a member of the Northwest Territories Legislature from 1983 to 1987. He was also a member of the Canadian Rangers, serving as a ranger for 28 years.

== Canadian Rangers ==
Paniloo joined the Canadian Rangers in 1979. He served with the Rangers up until his death on April 20, 2007. He died on duty while inspecting a northern warning station 200 km south of his home town of Clyde River. The territorial commissioner ruled his death was due to natural causes. The Canadian Forces honoured him with a full military funeral.

== Politics ==
Paniloo was first elected to the Northwest Territories Legislature in the 1983 Northwest Territories general election. He defeated incumbent Ipeelee Kilabuk to win the Baffin Central electoral district. Paniloo and Kilabuk ran against each other for the second time in the 1987 Northwest Territories general election this time with Kilabuk defeating Paniloo. He attempted to win his seat back running against Kilabuk in a three-way race in the 1991 Northwest Territories general election. He was defeated again finishing second behind Rebecca Mike. Kilabuk was also defeated finishing third.

Paniloo ran in a six-way race attempting to win Iqaluit Centre in the 2004 Nunavut general election.

After that election Paniloo failed to file a financial return with Elections Nunavut and was barred from running again in the next general election.

Paniloo had also previously served as mayor of Clyde River.

Legislative Assembly of the Northwest Territories
Preceded by Ipeelee Kilabuk	MLA Baffin Central; 1983-1987	Succeeded by Ipeelee Kilabuk
