= Clyde River, Nunavut =

Clyde River ᑲᖏᖅᑐᒑᐱᒃ Kangiqtugaapik
- Hamlet
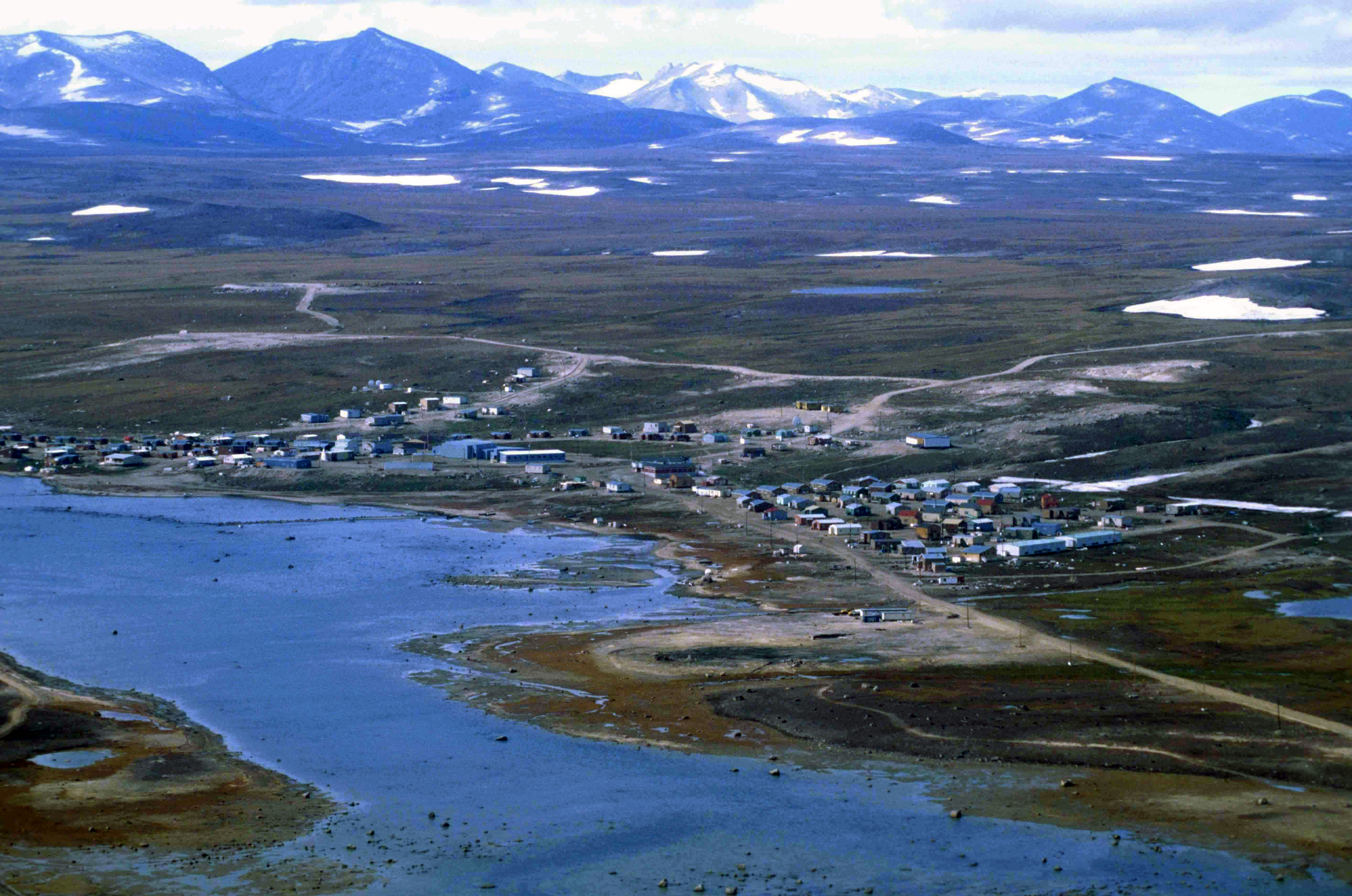
- Clyde River 1997

- Seal

- Location within Nunavut Location within Canada
- Coordinates: 70°28′05″N 068°35′40″W
- Country: Canada
- Territory: Nunavut
- Region: Qikiqtaaluk
- Electoral district: Uqqummiut

Government
  - Mayor: Alan Cormack
  - MLA: Gordon Kautuk

Area (2021)
  - Land: 103.38 km^{2} (39.92 sq mi)
- Elevation: 27 m (89 ft)

Population (2021)
  - Total: 1,181
  - Density: 11.4/km^{2} (30/sq mi)
- Time zone: UTC−05:00 (EST)
  - Summer (DST): UTC−04:00 (EDT)
- Postal code: X0A 0E0
- Area code: 867

Clyde River (Syllabics: ᑲᖏᖅᑐᒑᐱᒃ, Inuktitut: Kangiqtugaapik "nice little inlet") is an Inuit hamlet located on the shore of Baffin Island's Patricia Bay, off Kangiqtugaapik, an arm of Davis Strait in the Qikiqtaaluk Region of Nunavut, Canada. It lies in the Baffin Mountains which in turn form part of the Arctic Cordillera mountain range. The community is served by air and by annual supply sealift.

The community is served by Quluaq School, the Northern Stores, an arena, a community hall, an Anglican church (the Church of the Redeemer), a health centre, hotel and Clyde River Airport with regular flights to Iqaluit and Pond Inlet.

== Geography ==
It is located on a flood plain, surrounded by fjords that stretch all the way into the Barnes Ice Cap. The mountains, icebergs and glaciers in the Clyde River area attract rock and ice climbers from around the world.

There is also a multitude of animals to be seen, including barren-ground caribou, narwhals, polar bears and other sea mammals. The proposed "Igaliqtuuq National Wildlife Area", which would be a protected bowhead whale sanctuary, is located in Isabella Bay.

Clyde River is home to Piqqusilirivvik, Nunavut's Inuit Cultural Learning Centre. Piqqusilirivvik opened its doors May 2011.

=== Climate ===
Clyde River has a tundra climate (ET) with short but cool summers and long cold winters.

Climate data for Clyde River (Clyde River Airport) WMO ID: 71090; coordinates 70°29′10″N 68°31′00″W; elevation: 26.5 m (87 ft); 1991–2020 normals, extremes 1933–present
Month	Jan	Feb	Mar	Apr	May	Jun	Jul	Aug	Sep	Oct	Nov	Dec	Year
Record high humidex	2.2	1.7	0.1	7.2	8.5	16.1	23.6	20.7	14.4	8.1	1.7	1.7	23.6
Record high °C (°F)	3.3 (37.9)	3.3 (37.9)	0.2 (32.4)	11.7 (53.1)	8.9 (48.0)	17.8 (64.0)	22.2 (72.0)	20.6 (69.1)	14.6 (58.3)	11.4 (52.5)	6.7 (44.1)	2.8 (37.0)	22.2 (72.0)
Mean daily maximum °C (°F)	−24.2 (−11.6)	−25.1 (−13.2)	−22.0 (−7.6)	−13.4 (7.9)	−3.7 (25.3)	3.8 (38.8)	9.2 (48.6)	8.2 (46.8)	3.3 (37.9)	−2.9 (26.8)	−12.3 (9.9)	−19.0 (−2.2)	−8.2 (17.2)
Daily mean °C (°F)	−28.0 (−18.4)	−29.0 (−20.2)	−26.6 (−15.9)	−18.2 (−0.8)	−7.6 (18.3)	1.0 (33.8)	5.3 (41.5)	5.0 (41.0)	0.7 (33.3)	−6.3 (20.7)	−16.0 (3.2)	−23.0 (−9.4)	−11.9 (10.6)
Mean daily minimum °C (°F)	−31.8 (−25.2)	−32.8 (−27.0)	−31.2 (−24.2)	−23.0 (−9.4)	−11.3 (11.7)	−1.6 (29.1)	1.6 (34.9)	1.9 (35.4)	−1.6 (29.1)	−9.3 (15.3)	−19.6 (−3.3)	−26.8 (−16.2)	−15.5 (4.1)
Record low °C (°F)	−50.2 (−58.4)	−50.1 (−58.2)	−47.8 (−54.0)	−41.1 (−42.0)	−31.1 (−24.0)	−17.2 (1.0)	−6.8 (19.8)	−5.6 (21.9)	−16.1 (3.0)	−28.7 (−19.7)	−39.5 (−39.1)	−45.0 (−49.0)	−50.2 (−58.4)
Record low wind chill	−59.5	−62.4	−58.1	−48.9	−34.4	−20.0	−10.5	−9.5	−21.2	−36.4	−46.7	−55.3	−62.4
Average precipitation mm (inches)	10.4 (0.41)	8.1 (0.32)	11.9 (0.47)	10.9 (0.43)	15.0 (0.59)	20.3 (0.80)	25.0 (0.98)	28.7 (1.13)	37.9 (1.49)	30.0 (1.18)	18.4 (0.72)	15.4 (0.61)	231.9 (9.13)
Average rainfall mm (inches)	0.0 (0.0)	0.0 (0.0)	0.0 (0.0)	0.0 (0.0)	0.5 (0.02)	5.6 (0.22)	14.5 (0.57)	32.2 (1.27)	10.2 (0.40)	0.3 (0.01)	0.0 (0.0)	0.0 (0.0)	63.3 (2.49)
Average snowfall cm (inches)	10.6 (4.2)	8.7 (3.4)	8.4 (3.3)	12.7 (5.0)	16.5 (6.5)	12.5 (4.9)	6.6 (2.6)	5.2 (2.0)	27.7 (10.9)	40.4 (15.9)	28.2 (11.1)	17.2 (6.8)	194.7 (76.7)
Average precipitation days (≥ 0.2 mm)	8.0	7.1	7.5	8.8	10.3	8.3	9.6	10.8	15.0	16.0	11.1	9.9	122.3
Average rainy days (≥ 0.2 mm)	0.0	0.0	0.0	0.0	0.3	1.6	6.6	9.1	3.8	0.3	0.1	0.0	21.8
Average snowy days (≥ 0.2 cm)	7.3	6.6	6.8	8.7	10.5	5.6	2.4	3.3	12.0	17.0	11.8	8.4	100.3
Average relative humidity (%) (at 1500 LST)	68.3	66.7	67.6	74.4	83.0	84.5	79.3	80.4	81.0	82.8	78.5	71.7	76.5
Mean monthly sunshine hours	0.0	56.1	175.6	253.3	264.1	273.4	279.0	161.6	83.9	45.5	0.0	0.0	1,592.5
Percentage possible sunshine	0.0	28.6	48.8	51.8	37.9	38.0	37.6	28.0	20.7	16.4	0.0	0.0	34.2
Source: Environment and Climate Change Canada (rain/rain days, snow/snow days, sun 1981–2010 [does not include total precipitation)

== History ==
The Qiqiktani Truth Commission published a history of the Clyde River region in 2013, documenting the experience of Inuit in the region from 1950-1975. Inuit from the Qikiqtani Inuit Association and Makivik Corporation of Nunavik called upon the Canadian government to create the Qikitqani Truth Commission. This commission would investigate colonial practices, including forced relocation, cultural assimilation and the RCMP dog killings.

Anthropologist George Wenzel consulted Inuit residents who described their traditional use of the area as a seasonal movement from sealing grounds at the heads of fjords in winter, to fishing grounds in the upper fjords in May and June, to upland caribou hunting areas in summer, then returning fjord heads for char fishing in autumn and the fjord mouth sealing grounds for winter.

After many generations of Inuit use throughout the area, the Hudson's Bay Company established Clyde River as a post in 1923. It became a weather station in 1942, and a long range navigation station of the United States' LORAN program in 1953-54.

In the 1960s the population doubled, leading to numerous challenges of the centralizing population. For example, the mostly subsistence hunting economy of the 1950s transitioned to a mixed economy of hunting and wage work to pay for housing and other necessities. During this time the Royal Canadian Mounted Police (RCMP) enforced policies to kill sled dogs. Akitiq Sanguya contributed to the Qikitqani Truth Commission by describing instances of violence against qimmiit (Inuktitut for dog, sled dogs). A recording captures the interview where she explains an instance where a RCMP officer and an Inuk constable attempted to kill a group of dogs in her family's spring camp before being stopped by their owner. She also provided information about the experiences of Pauloosie Panalak. Sanguya relays the story about Panalak losing all of his 16 dogs to this violence against qimmits carried out by the Canadian Government. After Panalak returned from a quick supply run he encountered all his dogs murdered while still being tied down with his sled. This resulted in the displacement of Panalak who was not able to return to his home camp. The transition from dog teams to snowmobiles increased the need for wage work. Some residents went to work in the Nanisivik Mine on the north of Baffin Island when seal fur prices were low.

The concentration of families at Clyde River coincided with a move away from several ilagiit nunagivaktangit winter hunting camps, such as Akuliahatak at Arviqtujuq Kangiqtua (Eglinton Fjord), Naiaunausaq–Alpatuq at Henry Kater Peninsula, Natsilsiuk near Scott Inlet, and Nasalukuluk at Kangiqtualuk Uqquqti (Sam Ford Fjord). Between 1950 and 1969, up to 70 per cent of the Inuit population was removed to Indian hospitals for tuberculosis treatment in the south on the ship CGS C.D. Howe, leaving many gone for several years or never returning at all. This caused disruption of family units and the closure of winter camps like Natsilsiuk on Scott Inlet. The Clyde River community was moved from the east to the west side of Patricia Bay in 1970 after an engineering firm recommended moving away from the wet muskeg conditions of the historic site. In 1974 the LORAN station closed.

The Ilisaqsivik Society was founded in 2000, to serve as a center of cultural and economic resurgence. As of 2025 it employed 200 people in a population of 1,200 at Clyde River.

=== Supreme Court case ===
On June 26, 2014, the National Energy Board (NEB) approved the 5-year plan to conduct seismic blasting off the coast of Baffin Island, jointly submitted by TGS-NOPEC Geophysical Company ASA (TGS), Petroleum Geo-Services (PGS) and Multi Klient Invest AS (MKI). The approval sparked strong criticism from Inuit including the communities of Clyde River and Pond Inlet, the Arctic Fishery Alliance, the Baffin Fisheries Coalition and the Qikiqtani Inuit Association. Okalik Eegeesiak, then-president of the Qikiqtani Inuit Association said "They still don't get the fact that Inuit have concerns and we want to be part of the process," while Inuit photographer and Clyde River resident Niore Iqalukjuak was quoted saying "We depend on these waters for food and the very existence of Inuit life depend on them...We fear that what the Conservative government is doing is a cultural genocide and will end the Inuit way of life as we know it" and Clyde River Mayor, Jerry Natanine commented "Nobody cares for our concerns...And our Minister [of the Environment] in Ottawa, Leona Aglukkaq, not speaking up against this for Inuit is very wrong."

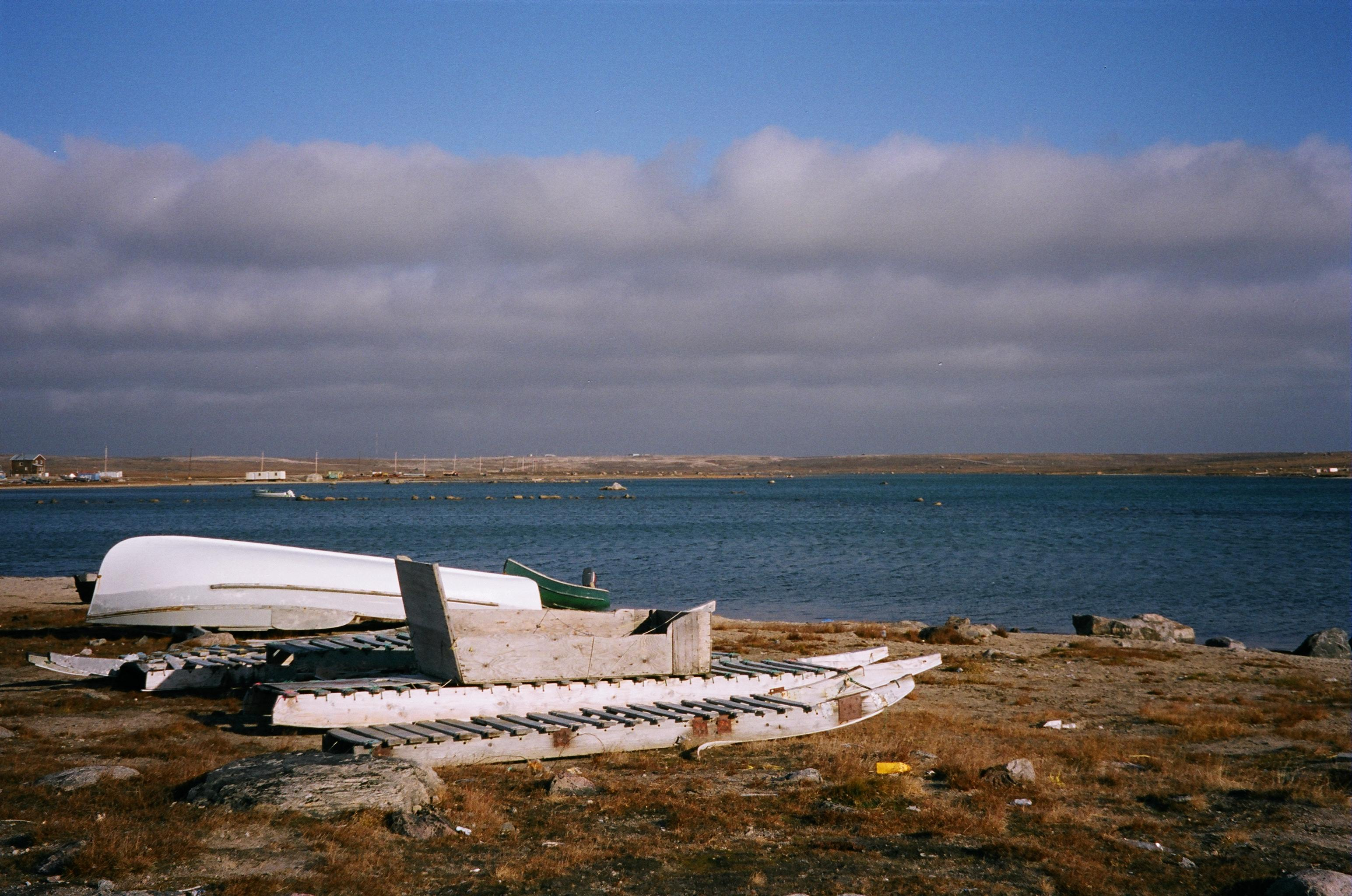
Beached qamutik at Clyde River

Mayor Natanine approached the environmental organization Greenpeace Canada in hopes that they could work together to prevent seismic blasting operations from taking place. This led to the development of a collaboration many dubbed "surprising" due to the history of taking opposing sides on the anti-sealing campaign of the 1970s and 80s.

On July 23, 2014, the community of Clyde River staged a protest against the NEB's approval, and on July 28 the Hamlet of Clyde River, the Nammautaq Hunters and Trappers Organization of Clyde River, and Clyde River Mayor Jerry Natanine filed a request for a judicial review at Federal Court of Appeal. The legal case argues that the NEB's decision goes against the government of Canada's duty to consult with Indigenous peoples under the United Nations Declaration on the Rights of Indigenous Peoples. Speaking of the importance of the case, constitutional lawyer Nader Hasan, who is representing Clyde River, argued: "The federal government has a solemn constitutional obligation to meaningfully consult and accommodate the people of Nunavut on any issues affecting their Aboriginal or treaty rights. That did not happen, and the NEB was again a rubber stamp for the energy industry."

The Court of Appeal denied the request in August 2015. But the groups requested leave to appeal before the Supreme Court of Canada in October 2015, arguing that the Court of Appeal's decision was mistaken, and that the case is of national importance, thus needing further debate. In November of the same year Greenpeace launched an international petition that has gathered over 129,000 signatures (as of July 2016) in support of this legal challenge.

On March 10, 2016, the Supreme Court of Canada granted Clyde River leave to appeal their case at the country's highest court, giving credence to the community's claim that their case is significant, thus needing further review by the courts. The hearing of the case was scheduled for November 20, 2016.

In July 2017, the Supreme Court ruled in Clyde River's favour, ruling that oil and gas exploration cannot go ahead.

== Demographics ==
In the 2021 Canadian census conducted by Statistics Canada, Clyde River had a population of 1,181 living in 258 of its 278 total private dwellings, a change of 12.2 per cent from its 2016 population of 1,053. With a land area of 103.38 km^{2} (39.92 sq mi), it had a population density of 11.4/km^{2} (29.6/sq mi) in 2021.

Federal census population history of Clyde River

Year	Pop.	±%
1976	352	—
1981	443	+25.9%
1986	471	+6.3%
1991	565	+20.0%
1996	708	+25.3%

Year	Pop.	±%
2001	785	+10.9%
2006	820	+4.5%
2011	934	+13.9%
2016	1,053	+12.7%
2021	1,181	+12.2%

Source: Statistics Canada

== Broadband communications ==
The community has been served by the Qiniq network since 2005. Qiniq is a fixed wireless service to homes and businesses, connecting to the outside world via a satellite backbone. The Qiniq network is designed and operated by SSI Micro. In 2017, the network was upgraded to 4G LTE technology, and 2G-GSM for mobile voice.

== Notable residents ==
- Kautaq Jushua Illauq (December 28, c.1950–Feb. 12, 2025) was a traveller, outfitter, heavy equipment mechanic and driver, soapstone carver, and elder cultural consultant from Clyde River. He consulted with the Isaruit Inuit Arts collective in Ottawa, Canada.
- Pauloosie Paniloo (1943–2007) was a territorial level politician. He served as a member of the Northwest Territories Legislature from 1983 to 1987. He was also a member of the Canadian Rangers, serving as a ranger for 28 years.
- Jerry Natanine is a former mayor of Clyde River who led a campaign and legal challenge to seismic testing that was decided in the community's favor by the Supreme Court of Canada.
- Akitiq Sanguya (b. July 1, 1935) is an Inuk sculptor from Clyde River/Kangiqtugaapik. She participated in the Qiqiktani Truth Commission, describing experiences during the RCMP dog killings.

== Gallery ==
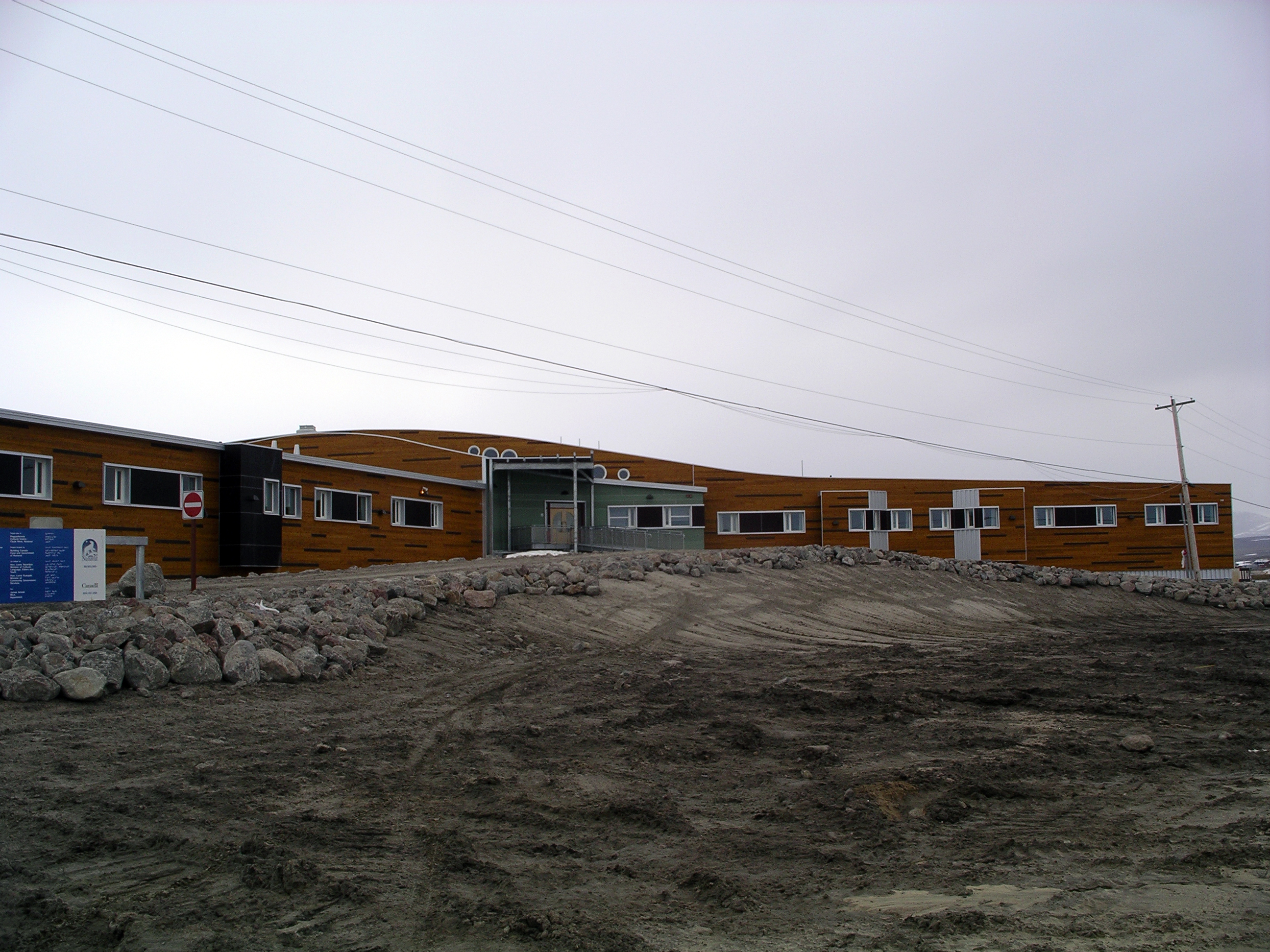
Cultural centre

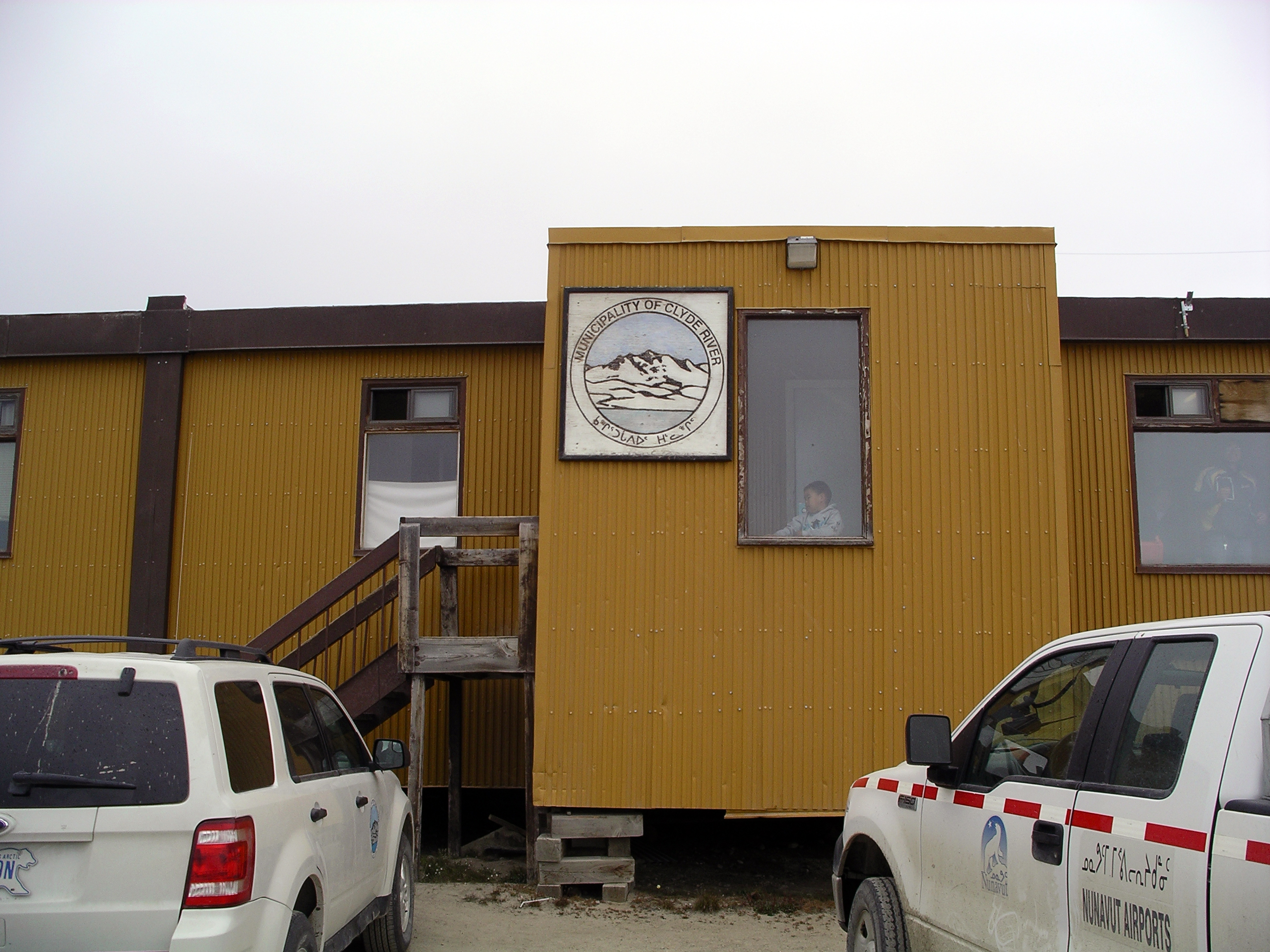
Hamlet offices

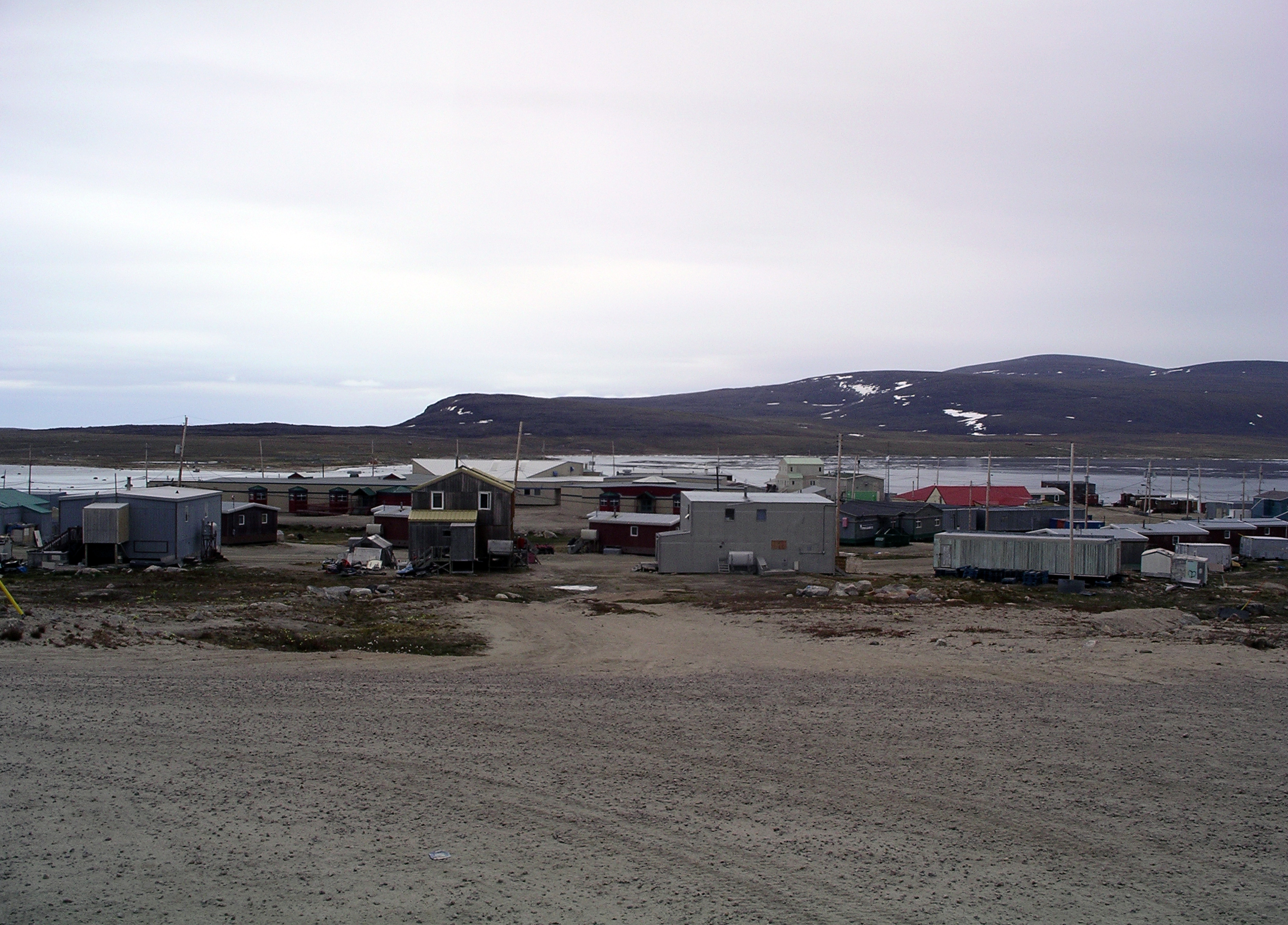
Another shot of Clyde River

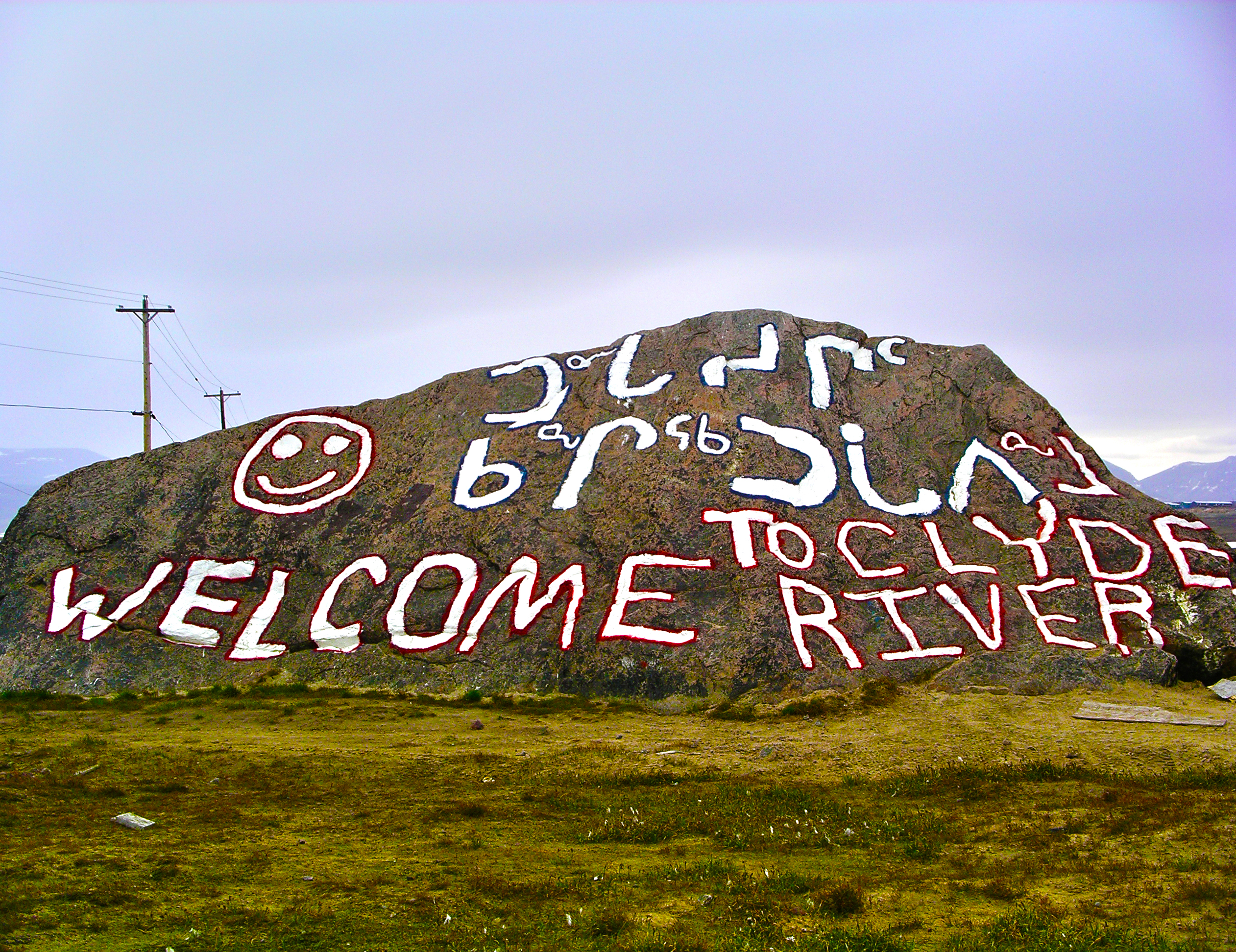
Rock with welcome sign on it

== See also ==
- List of municipalities in Nunavut
- Pauloosie Paniloo
- Tommy Enuaraq
