= 79th meridian west =

Line of longitude

79th meridian west

The meridian 79° west of Greenwich is a line of longitude that extends from the North Pole across the Arctic Ocean, North America, the Atlantic Ocean, the Caribbean Sea, Panama, South America, the Pacific Ocean, the Southern Ocean, and Antarctica to the South Pole.

The 79th meridian west forms a great ellipse with the 101st meridian east.

== From Pole to Pole ==
Starting at the North Pole and heading south to the South Pole, the 79th meridian west passes through:

Co-ordinates	Country, territory or sea	Notes
90°0′N 79°0′W	Arctic Ocean	
82°52′N 79°0′W	Canada	Nunavut — Ellesmere Island
76°25′N 79°0′W	Glacier Strait	
76°7′N 79°0′W	Canada	Nunavut — Coburg Island
75°50′N 79°0′W	Baffin Bay	
73°38′N 79°0′W	Canada	Nunavut — Bylot Island
72°46′N 79°0′W	Eclipse Sound	
72°26′N 79°0′W	Canada	Nunavut — Emmerson Island, Frechette Island and Baffin Island
69°53′N 79°0′W	Foxe Basin	Passing just west of Koch Island, Nunavut, Canada (at 69°29′N 78°51′W)
69°7′N 79°0′W	Canada	Nunavut — Rowley Island
68°54′N 79°0′W	Foxe Basin	Passing just west of North Spicer Island, Nunavut, Canada (at 68°29′N 78°57′W)
68°22′N 79°0′W	Canada	Nunavut — South Spicer Island
68°11′N 79°0′W	Foxe Basin	
65°30′N 79°0′W	Foxe Channel	
62°42′N 79°0′W	Hudson Bay	Passing just west of Elsie Island, Nunavut, Canada (at 58°51′N 78°58′W)
56°25′N 79°0′W	Canada	Nunavut — Flaherty Island and Innetalling Island
55°59′N 79°0′W	Hudson Bay	Passing just east of Long Island, Nunavut, Canada (at 54°56′N 79°1′W)
54°50′N 79°0′W	Canada	Quebec
53°24′N 79°0′W	James Bay	Passing west of Waskaganish (Fort Rupert, Quebec) at 51°29′N 79°0′W
51°47′N 79°0′W	Canada	Quebec; Ontario — from 46°35′N 79°0′W
43°49′N 79°0′W	Lake Ontario	
43°16′N 79°0′W	United States	New York — passing just east of Niagara Falls (at 43°5′N 79°4′W) and west of Lockport (at 43°10′N 78°42′W)
42°58′N 79°0′W	Canada	Ontario
42°52′N 79°0′W	Lake Erie	
42°42′N 79°0′W	United States	New York — Grand Island and the Niagara River near Buffalo; Pennsylvania — from 42°0′N 79°0′W; Maryland — from 39°43′N 79°0′W; West Virginia — from 39°27′N 79°0′W; Virginia — passing just east of Staunton at 38°9′N 79°4′W; North Carolina — passing just west of Durham at 35°59′N 79°0′W; South Carolina — from 34°14′N 79°0′W
33°34′N 79°0′W	Atlantic Ocean	Passing just west of Grand Bahama, Bahamas (at 26°41′N 79°0′W)
22°40′N 79°0′W	Cuba	Cayo Santa Maria and the mainland
21°36′N 79°0′W	Caribbean Sea	
20°53′N 79°0′W	Cuba	Doce Leguas Cays
20°51′N 79°0′W	Caribbean Sea	
9°34′N 79°0′W	Panama	
8°57′N 79°0′W	Pacific Ocean	Gulf of Panama
8°28′N 79°0′W	Panama	Pearl Islands
8°27′N 79°0′W	Pacific Ocean	
1°41′N 79°0′W	Colombia	Westernmost point
1°35′N 79°0′W	Pacific Ocean	Ancón de Sardinas Bay
1°14′N 79°0′W	Ecuador	
4°59′S 79°0′W	Peru	
8°13′S 79°0′W	Pacific Ocean	
33°40′S 79°0′W	Chile	Islands of Robinson Crusoe and Santa Clara
33°42′S 79°0′W	Pacific Ocean	
60°0′S 79°0′W	Southern Ocean	
72°57′S 79°0′W	Antarctica	Territory claimed by Chile (Antártica Chilena Province) and by the United Kingdom (British Antarctic Territory)

== See also ==
- 78th meridian west
- 80th meridian west
