= Milne Inlet =

Inlet at confluence of Eclipse Sound and Navy Board Inlet in Nunavut

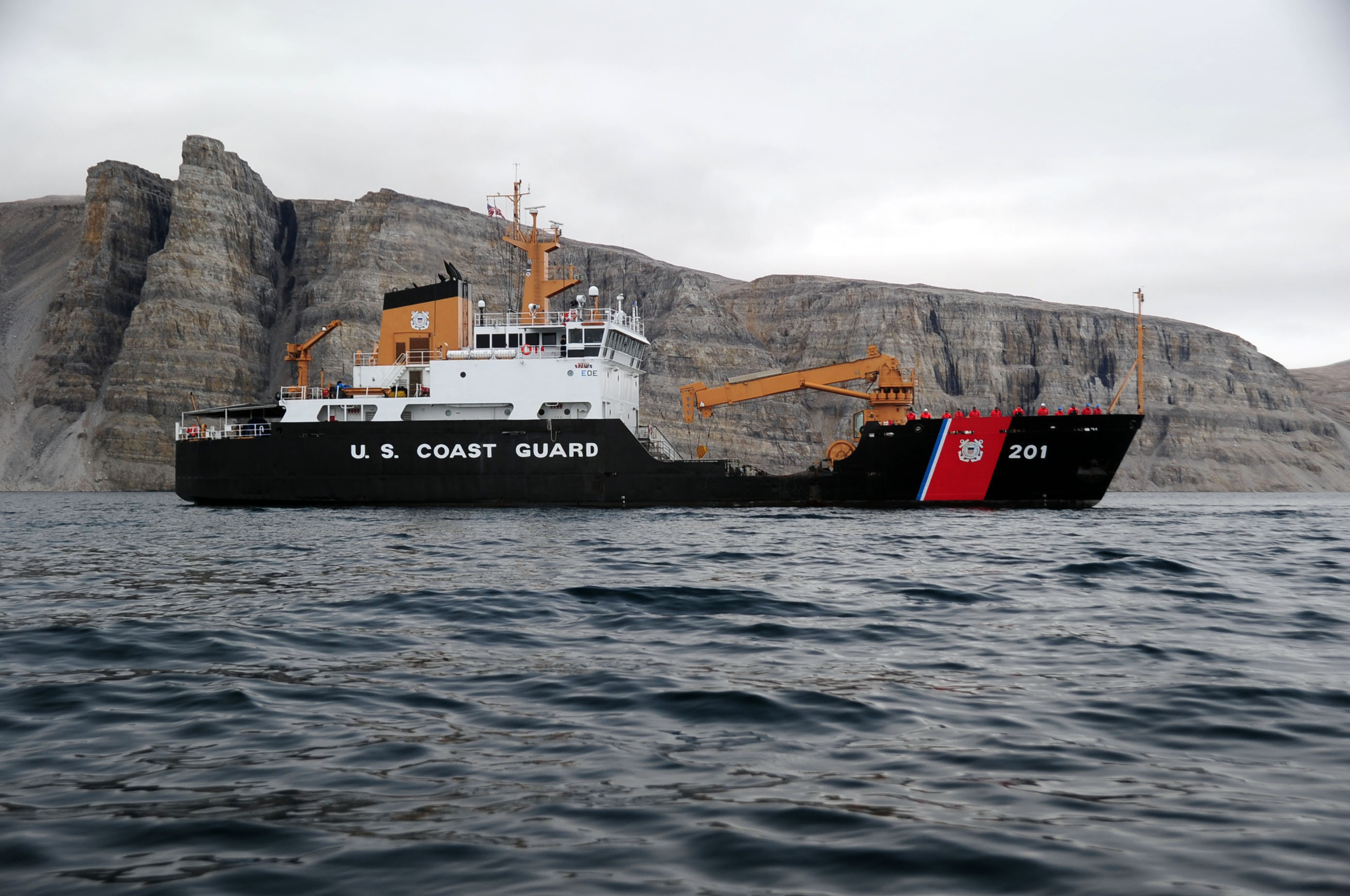
United States Coast Guard Cutter Juniper navigating through Milne Inlet in 2012

Milne Inlet (72°15′N 080°30′W) is a small, shallow arm of Eclipse Sound which, along with Navy Board Inlet, separates Bylot Island from Baffin Island in Nunavut's Qikiqtaaluk Region. Milne Inlet flows in a southerly direction from Navy Board Inlet at the confluence of Eclipse Sound. Milne Inlet is shallow and has high tides and strong winds. It only has 90 days where it is ice-free—from August to October. The hamlet of Mittimatalik —Pond Inlet which is 92% Inuit, is the gateway to many tourist attractions in the region, and is 80 km from Milne Inlet. The region is part of the Arctic Cordillera, with one of Canada's most inhospitable climates—with long, dark winters and temperatures averaging −35 °C (−31 °F).

Baffinland Iron Mines Corporation, which owns the Mary River iron ore mine—100 km (62 mi) from Milne Inlet, began to develop a harbour infrastructure in Milne Inlet in the 2000s, which became operational in 2015. Baffinland which has submitted plans to double—and eventually triple its production—has applied for the use of ice-breakers to keep the waters open for ten months, much to the concern of surrounding Inuit communities.

== Overview ==
Milne Inlet, is a shallow inlet, 80 km in length and 30 km at its mouth, located across from Bylot Island on the other side of Eclipse Sound. It is shallow, has high tides, and strong winds. It freezes over in October and is open again in August.

Eclipse Sound is part of the Tallurutiup Imanga National Marine Conservation Area (NMCA)—a national marine conservation area that includes all of the waters surrounding Bylot Island. The NMCA covers an area of 108,000 km^{2} (42,000 sq mi) including the waters surrounding the marine portions of Sirmilik National Park, Nirjutiqavvik National Wildlife Area, Bylot Island Migratory Bird Sanctuary, and Prince Leopold Island Migratory Bird Sanctuary. In August 2019, the Government of Canada and the Qikiqtani Inuit Association (QIA) announced the signing of an Inuit Impact and Benefit Agreement (IIBA), required for final establishment of Tallurutiup Imanga National Marine Conservation Area.

The nearby hamlet of Mittimatalik —Pond Inlet, with a population of 1,617, which is 92% Inuit, is the largest community in Northern Baffin Island. The region is part of the Arctic Cordillera, with one of Canada's most inhospitable climates—with long, dark winters and temperatures averaging −35 °C (−31 °F). The Inuit in the area depend on a combination of wage income supplemented by traditional subsistence activities such as "including hunting, fishing, trapping and gathering."

== Mary River Mine ==
Baffinland Iron Mines Corporation, which owns the Mary River iron ore mine—100 km (62 mi) from Milne Inlet, began to develop a harbour infrastructure in Milne Inlet in the 2000s. Before the inlet froze in 2018 alone, the mining company had made 71 trips from Milne Inlet to its European markets and elsewhere carrying an "average 71,750 tonnes of iron ore each".

The open waters of Baffin Bay—which leads to the northern Atlantic Ocean—can only be reached from Baffinland's Milne Inlet mining port through a 160 km (99 mi)-long channel between Bylot Island and Baffin Island. All the waters surrounding Bylot Island and the island itself, are part of the Tallurutiup Imanga National Marine Conservation Area and the area is considered to be "exceptionally rich in high concentrations of terrestrial and marine wildlife." It is a region of "ice caps, glaciers, icebergs, mountains, sand and sandstone hoodoos, pingos, and the "most diverse and largest avian communities in the Arctic." Its marine mammal population includes narwhal and beluga whales, as well as seal, walrus and polar bear.

In October 2019,

There are two small islands in Milne Inlet—Ragged Island—which is located at the inlet's opening, and Stephens Island, which is located further within.
