= 80th meridian west =

Line of longitude

80th meridian west (interactive map)

The meridian 80° west of Greenwich is a line of longitude that extends from the North Pole across the Arctic Ocean, North America, the Atlantic Ocean, the Caribbean Sea, Panama, South America, the Pacific Ocean, the Southern Ocean, and Antarctica to the South Pole.

In Antarctica, the meridian defines the western limit of the British territorial claim and passes through the Chilean claim – the two claims overlap.

The 80th meridian west forms a great circle with the 100th meridian east.

== From Pole to Pole ==
Starting at the North Pole and heading south to the South Pole, the 80th meridian west passes through:

Co-ordinates	Country, territory or sea	Notes
90°0′N 80°0′W	Arctic Ocean	
82°56′N 80°0′W	Canada	Nunavut — Ellesmere Island
76°14′N 80°0′W	Jones Sound	Passing just west of Coburg Island, Nunavut, Canada (at 75°52′N 79°45′W)
75°33′N 80°0′W	Canada	Nunavut — Devon Island and Philpots Island
74°50′N 80°0′W	Baffin Bay	
73°44′N 80°0′W	Canada	Nunavut — Bylot Island
72°53′N 80°0′W	Eclipse Sound	
72°31′N 80°0′W	Canada	Nunavut — Imiliit and Baffin Island
69°57′N 80°0′W	Murray Maxwell Bay	
69°44′N 80°0′W	Canada	Nunavut — Kapuiviit
69°30′N 80°0′W	Foxe Basin	
65°30′N 80°0′W	Foxe Channel	Passing just east of Southampton Island, Nunavut, Canada (at 63°46′N 80°9′W)
63°4′N 80°0′W	Hudson Bay	
62°19′N 80°0′W	Canada	Nunavut — Mansel Island
61°43′N 80°0′W	Hudson Bay	
59°53′N 80°0′W	Canada	Nunavut — Gilmour Island
59°48′N 80°0′W	Hudson Bay	Passing just west of Split Island, Nunavut, Canada
56°19′N 80°0′W	Canada	Nunavut — Kugong Island and Flaherty Island
55°54′N 80°0′W	Hudson Bay	
54°41′N 80°0′W	James Bay	
53°23′N 80°0′W	Canada	Nunavut — North Twin Island
53°14′N 80°0′W	James Bay	Passing just west of South Twin Island, Nunavut, Canada (at 53°7′N 79°56′W)
51°14′N 80°0′W	Canada	Ontario
42°48′N 80°0′W	Lake Erie	
42°10′N 80°0′W	United States	Pennsylvania — passing through Pittsburgh (at 40°26′N 80°0′W); West Virginia — from 39°43′N 80°0′W; Virginia — from 38°0′N 80°0′W; North Carolina — from 36°32′N 80°0′W; South Carolina — from 34°48′N 80°0′W, passing through Charleston (at 32°52′N 80°0′W)
32°37′N 80°0′W	Atlantic Ocean	Passing just east of Palm Beach, Florida, United States (at 26°42′N 80°1′W); Passing through the Cay Sal Bank atoll, Bahamas (at 24°4′N 80°0′W)
23°3′N 80°0′W	Cuba	
21°44′N 80°0′W	Caribbean Sea	
19°43′N 80°0′W	Cayman Islands	Island of Little Cayman
19°42′N 80°0′W	Caribbean Sea	
9°20′N 80°0′W	Panama	
8°26′N 80°0′W	Gulf of Panama	
7°31′N 80°0′W	Panama	Passing through the tip of the Azuero Peninsula
7°28′N 80°0′W	Pacific Ocean	
0°49′N 80°0′W	Ecuador	The mainland, Puná Island, and the mainland again
4°22′S 80°0′W	Peru	Piura Region; Lambayeque Region — from 5°41′S 80°0′W
6°44′S 80°0′W	Pacific Ocean	Passing close between the Desventuradas Islands, Chile (at 26°19′S 80°0′W); Passing some distance between the Juan Fernández Islands, Chile (at 33°40′S 80°0′W)
60°0′S 80°0′W	Southern Ocean	
73°2′S 80°0′W	Antarctica	Defines the western limit of British Antarctic Territory, claimed by United Kingdom; Passes through Antártica Chilena Province, claimed by Chile

== See also ==
- 79th meridian west
- 81st meridian west
