= Tallurutiup Imanga National Marine Conservation Area =

National marine conservation area in Nunavut, Canada

- IUCN category VI (protected area with sustainable use of natural resources)
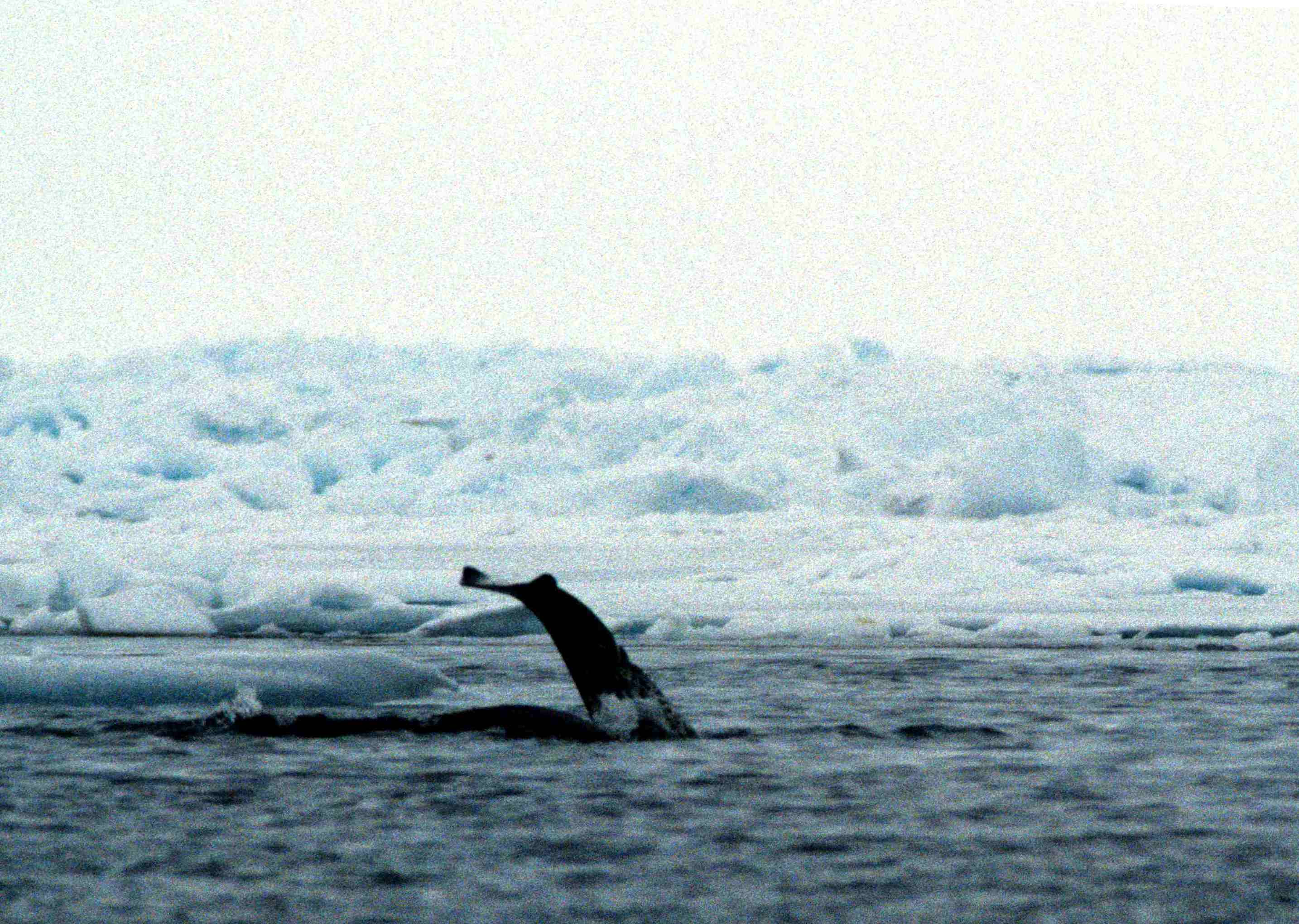
- Fluke of a narwhal off the coast of Bylot Island

- Location within Canada Location within Nunavut
- Location: Qikiqtani Region, Nunavut, Canada
- Nearest city: Pond Inlet
- Coordinates: 74°09′N 81°00′W
- Area: 108,000 km^{2} (42,000 sq mi)
- Designation: Proposed National Marine Conservation Area
- Established: August 1, 2019
- Governing body: Qikiqtani Inuit Association and Parks Canada

Tallurutiup Imanga National Marine Conservation Area is a proposed National Marine Conservation Area (NMCA) located in the Qikiqtani Region of Nunavut, Canada. The goal of the marine conservation area is to work with local Inuit to conserve the rich biodiversity of Lancaster Sound and its adjacent waterways. Once formally established under the Canada National Marine Conservation Areas Act, it will become the largest Parks Canada and Qikiqtani Inuit Association (QIA) co-managed protected area and the second largest protected area in Canada after Tuvaijuittuq Marine Protected Area.

== History ==
In 2009, the governments of Canada and Nunavut and the Qikiqtani Inuit Association (QIA) signed a memorandum of understanding to begin assessing the feasibility of establishing a NMCA in Lancaster Sound. It also established the Steering Committee to conduct consultations with local communities and key stakeholders.

In 2010, Parks Canada announced a potential future boundary of 44,300 km^{2} (17,100 sq mi) for an NMCA in Lancaster Sound. Additional studies and consultations were performed in the years that followed to determine what marine areas should be included or excluded from the proposed NMCA.

In February 2017, the Steering Committee submitted its report and recommendations on the feasibility of an NMCA in Lancaster Sound to the ministers of Environment for Canada and Nunavut, and to the President of the Qikiqtani Inuit Association (QIA) in February 2017. The Senior Mineral and Energy Resource Assessment Committee approved of the Steering Committee’s recommended boundary the following May. The Governments of Canada and Nunavut and the QIA began negotiations on an Inuit Impact and Benefit Agreement the following August.

In August 2019, the Government of Canada and the QIA announced the signing of an Inuit Impact and Benefit Agreement (IIBA), required for final establishment of Tallurutiup Imanga National Marine Conservation Area. With the signing of the IIBA, Parks Canada and QIA will begin to operationalize the NMCA.

As of January 2023, formal establishment under the Canada National Marine Conservation Areas Act has yet to occur.

== Geography ==
The NCMA covers an area of 108,000 km^{2} (42,000 sq mi) stretching from Baffin Bay between Buchan Gulf and southeastern Ellesmere Island, to the 96th meridian west between Cornwallis Island and Somerset Island. It would surround the marine portions of Sirmilik National Park, Nirjutiqavvik National Wildlife Area, Bylot Island Migratory Bird Sanctuary, and Prince Leopold Island Migratory Bird Sanctuary.

== Ecology ==
The ecological importance of Lancaster Sound is due to the presence of polynyas in its waters. These small pockets of open water provide refuge for Arctic marine and bird species during winter months. These winter refuges are also areas where Inuit undertake many traditional activities.

== See also ==
- List of national parks of Canada
- Marine Protected Areas of Canada
