= Paquet Bay =

Bay in Nunavut, Canada

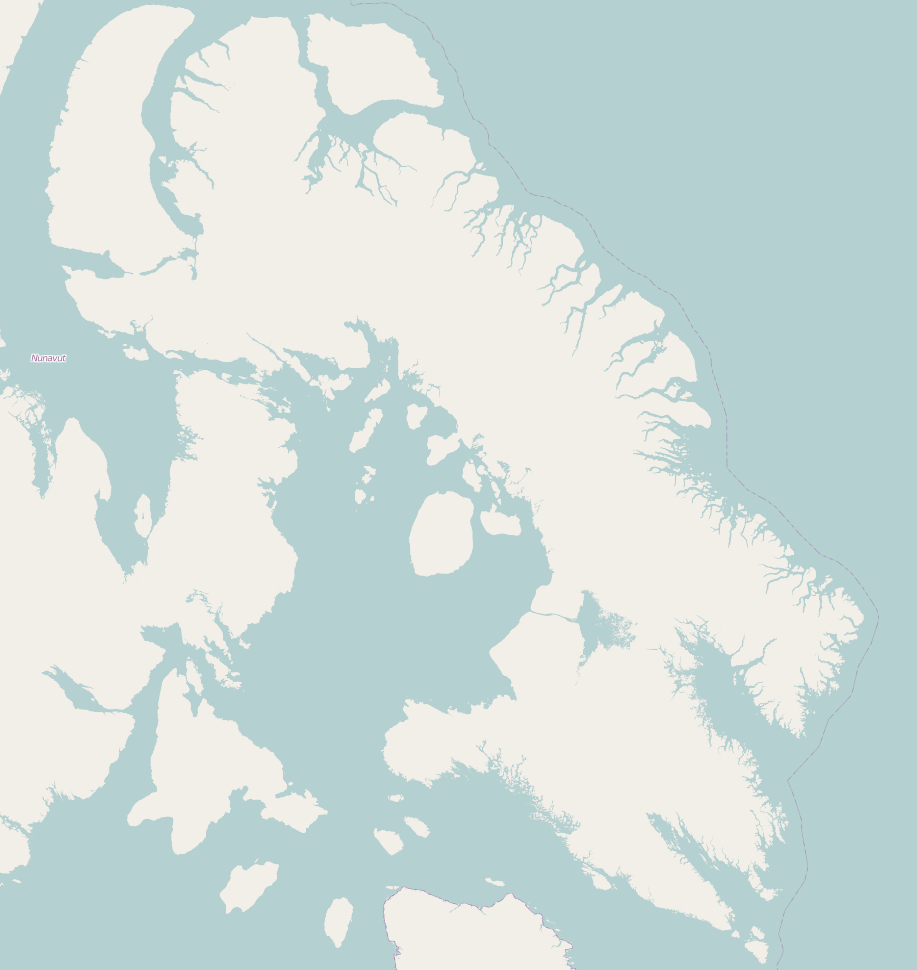
- Location within Baffin Island Location within Nunavut Location within Canada
- Location: Between Tay Sound and Kangiqłuruluk
- Coordinates: 72°00′N 78°25′W
- Ocean/sea sources: Arctic Ocean
- Basin countries: Canada
- Settlements: Uninhabited

Paquet Bay is an Arctic waterway in the Qikiqtaaluk Region, Nunavut, Canada. Located at Baffin Island's Borden Peninsula, Paquet Bay is situated between Tay Sound and Kangiqłuruluk, formerly Oliver Sound. Mumiksaa, formerly Frechette Island, is located at its mouth.
