= Southwest Bylot Plain =

Plain in Nunavut, Canada

Coordinates: 72.92°N 79.5°W

The Southwest Bylot plain is an uninhabited plain in Qikiqtaaluk, Nunavut, Canada. It is located in southwestern Bylot Island directly north of Eclipse Sound. Pond Inlet is the closest community. Southwest Bylot is notable for housing the largest known breeding colony of the greater snow goose.

== Geography ==
The plain's habitat is characterized as a rolling outwash with barrens, rocky flats, and tundra. Its elevation reaches a height of 500 m (1,600 ft) above sea level. The plain has been dissected by glacial rivers and it slopes towards the mountains.

== Flora ==
Dominant vegetation includes low shrub-herb, and shrub-sedge tundra, along with heath and willow in the river valleys.

== Fauna ==
In addition to the greater snow goose, notable bird species include: black-legged kittiwake, ivory gull, peregrine falcon, Ross's gull, thick-billed murre, colonial waterbirds, and waterfowl.

== Conservation ==
The Southwest Bylot plain is a Canadian Important Bird Area (#NU013). It is 1,511 km^{2} (583 sq mi) in size and is situated within the Bylot Island Migratory Bird Sanctuary. It is one of three IBAs on the island, the others being Cape Graham Moore and Cape Hay. Southwest Bylot is also an International Biological Program site.
