= Cape Hay =

Headland in Nunavut, Canada

Coordinates: 73°45′00″N 080°22′12″W

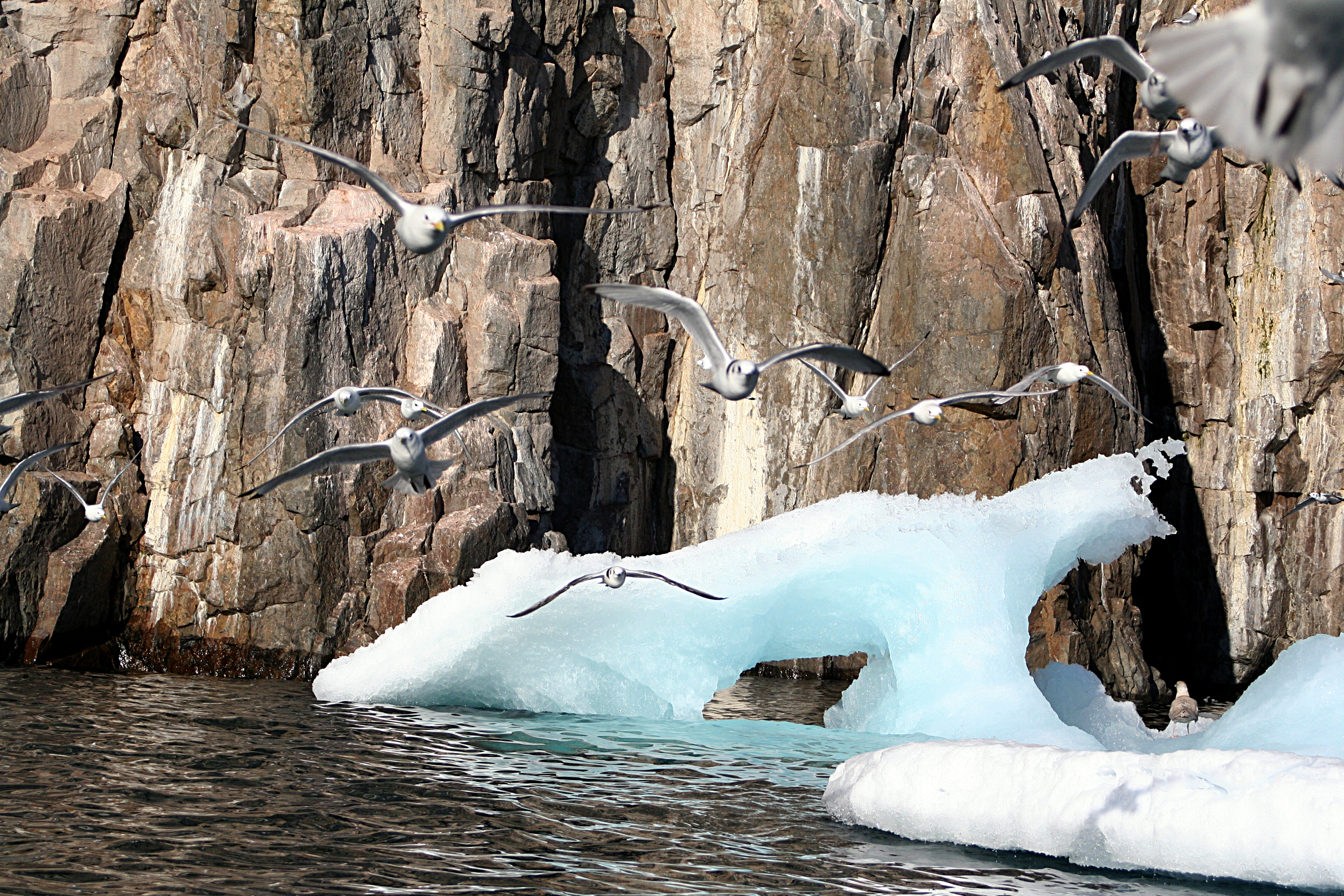
View of Cape Hay in the High Arctic.

Cape Hay is an uninhabited headland on Bylot Island in the Qikiqtaaluk Region of Nunavut, Canada. It is located at the island's northwestern tip, protruding into Lancaster Sound. The Wollaston Islands are offshore.

It is named in honor of Admiral Sir John Hay, Secretary of the Royal Navy.

== Geography ==
The habitat is characterized by coastal cliffs, rocky shores, and tundra. The elevation can reach 460 m (1,510 ft) above sea level. It is 3.5 km^{2} (1.4 sq mi) in size.

== Conservation ==
The cape is a Canadian Important Bird Area (#NU004) and an International Biological Program site. It is situated within the Bylot Island Migratory Bird Sanctuary and the Sirmilik (North Baffin) National Park. Other IBAs on the island include Cape Graham Moore and the Southwest Bylot plain.

== Avifauna ==
Notable bird species include the black-legged kittiwake and thick-billed murre, both of which are colonial seabirds. The area is also frequented by narwhals, polar bears, harp seals, ringed seals and white whales
