= Qimivvik =

Island in Nunavut, Canada

Native name: ᕿᒥᕝᕕᒃ
- Location within Nunavut Location within Canada

Geography
- Location: Tasiujaq
- Coordinates: 72°23′25″N 78°54′14″W
- Archipelago: Arctic Archipelago

Administration
- Canada
- Nunavut: Nunavut
- Region: Qikiqtaaluk

Demographics
- Population: Uninhabited

Qimivvik (Inuktitut: ᕿᒥᕝᕕᒃ), formerly Emmerson Island, is a member of the Arctic Archipelago in the Qikiqtaaluk Region of Nunavut. Located in Tasiujaq near the mouths of Oliver Sound and Tay Sound, it is an irregularly shaped island off the Baffin Island coast. Mumiksaa lies to its south.
