= 101st meridian =

101st meridian may refer to:

- 101st meridian east, a line of longitude east of the Greenwich Meridian
- 101st meridian west, a line of longitude west of the Greenwich Meridian

101st meridian west	101st meridian east
