= North Water Polynya =

Polynya between Greenland and Canada in Baffin Bay

Coordinates: 76°35′N 073°57′W

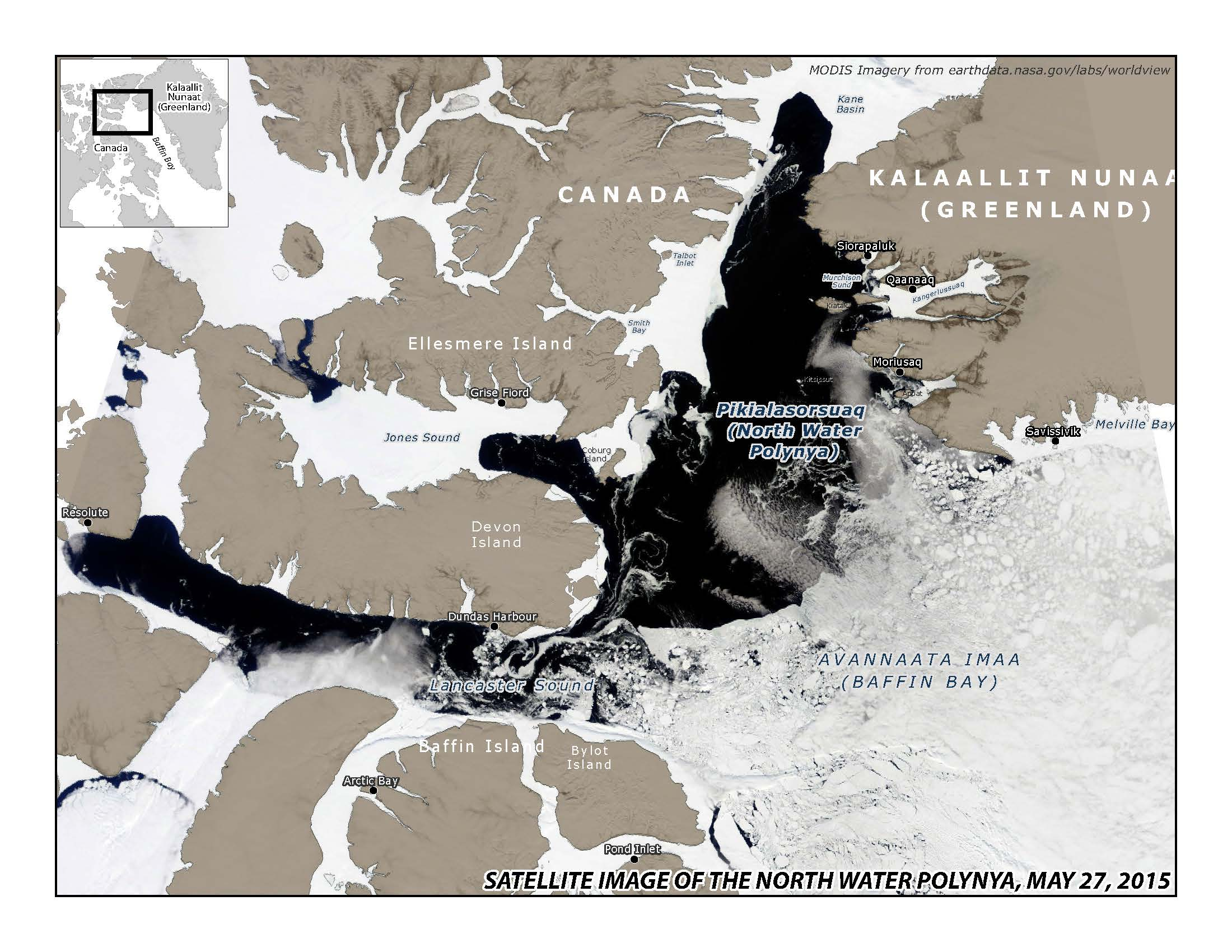
Satellite image of North Water Polynya in May 2015

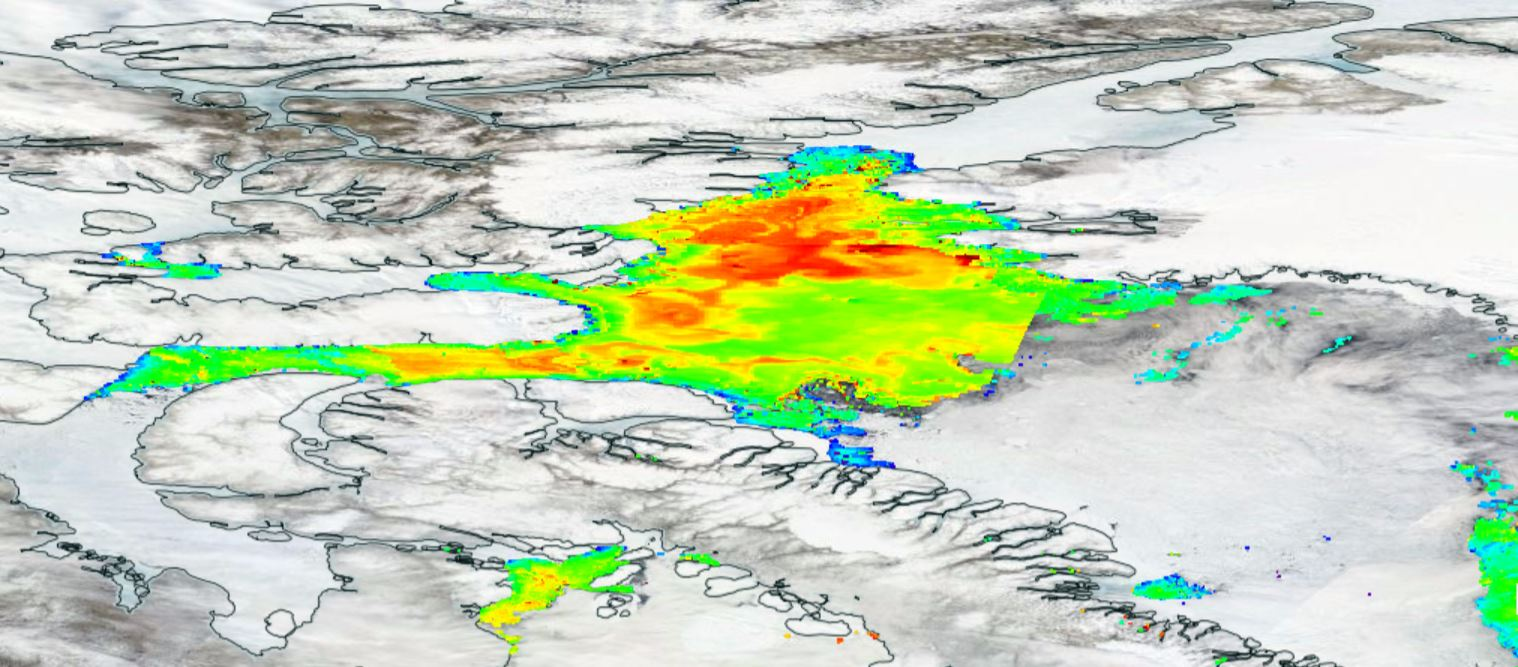
Concentrated phytoplankton productivity in the North Water on June 14, 2016

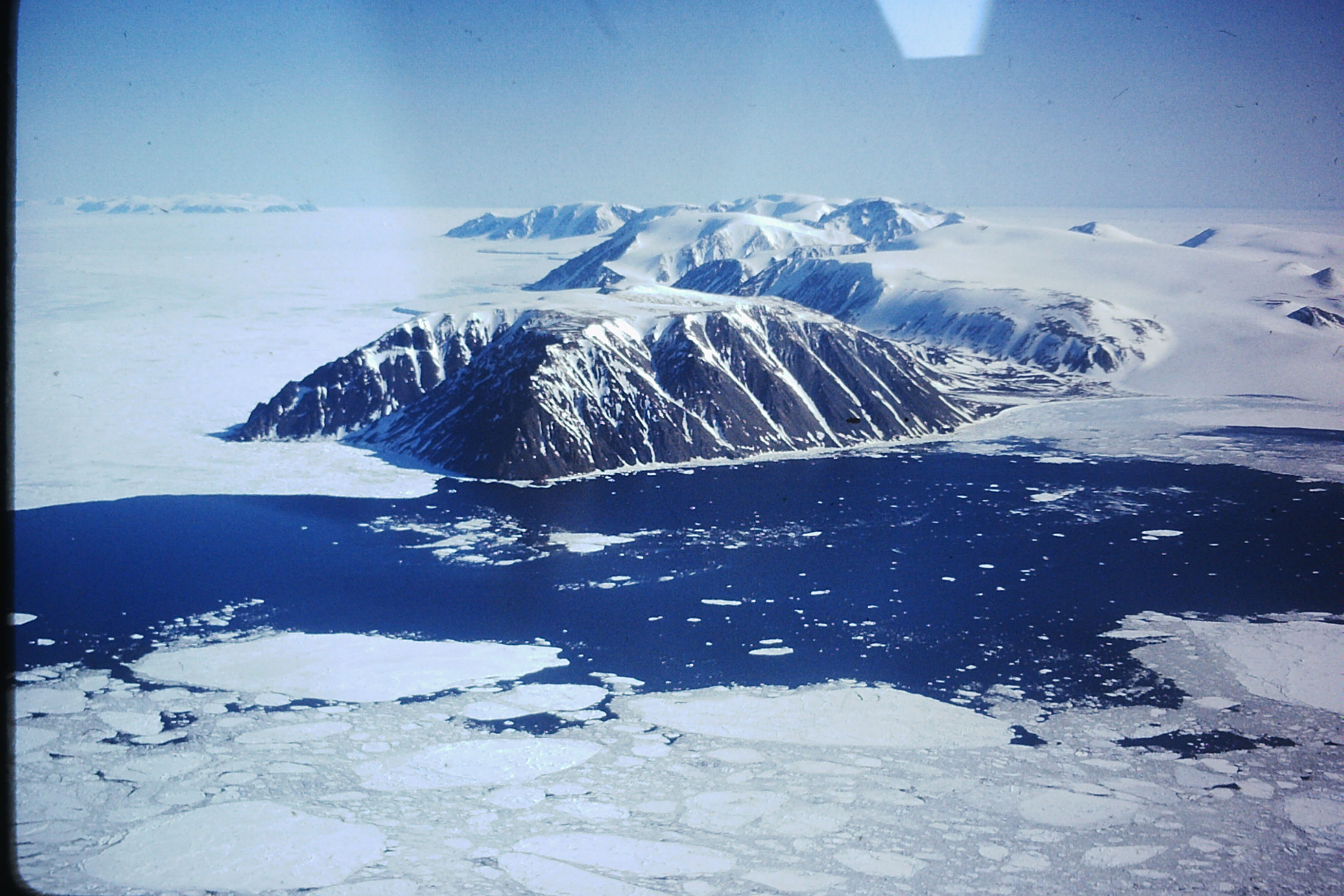
North Water polynia in June 1975, Coburg Island and Ellesmere Island in the background

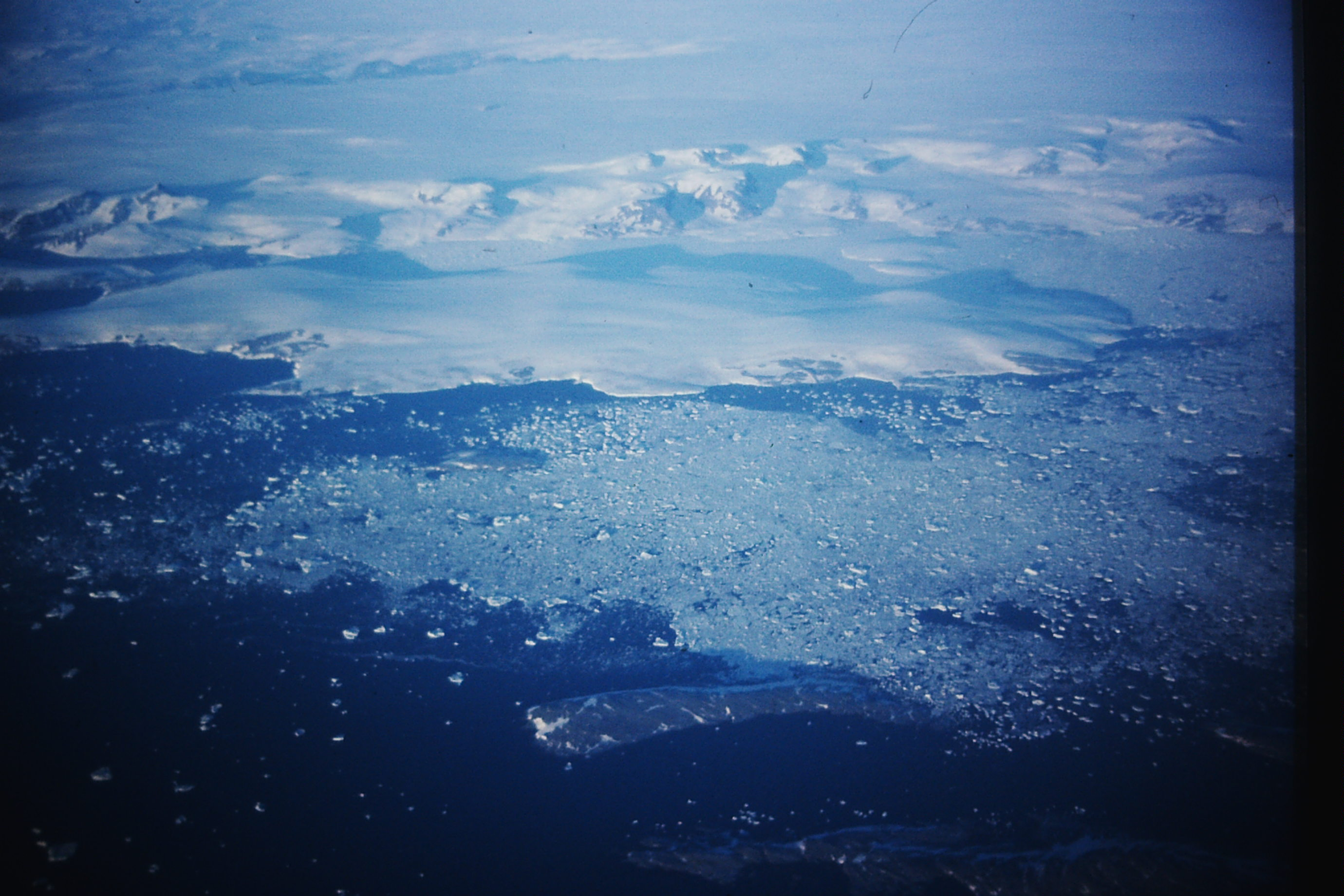
North Water polynia and Coburg Island

The North Water Polynya (NOW), or Pikialasorsuaq to Inuit in Greenland and Sarvarjuaq to Inuit in Canada, is a polynya (area of year-round open water surrounded by sea ice) that lies between Greenland and Canada in northern Baffin Bay. The world's largest Arctic polynya at about 85,000 km^{2} (33,000 sq mi), it creates a warm microclimate that provides a refuge for narwhal, beluga, walrus, and bowhead whales to feed and rest. While thin ice forms in some areas, the polynya is kept open by wind, tides and an ice bridge on its northern edge. Named the "North Water" by 19th century whalers who relied on it for spring passage, this polynya is one of the most biologically productive marine areas in the Arctic Ocean.

== Fauna ==
Polynyas are often compared to oases as their open waters allow for an unusually early spring plankton bloom and an open water wintering area in a frozen world. This provides food for Arctic cod, a species that plays a critical role in supporting the entire ecosystem. Large concentrations of marine mammals, from walrus to seals and polar bears, feed at the ice edge until spring break-up. The same habitat provides vital feeding grounds for millions of seabirds, including an estimated two-thirds of the world population of little auk (dovekie) and thick-billed murres.

== Human history ==
This region has been home to the northernmost human settlements in the world for at least 5,000 years, through the Dorset and Thule cultural migrations. Present-day Inuit communities in Canada (Nunavut) and Avanersuaq (Greenland) rely on the polynya's concentration of marine mammals to sustain their traditional way of life.

The North Water is home to the northernmost self-sufficient human settlements in the world, and borders three Qikiqtani Inuit communities in Canada: Arctic Bay, Pond Inlet and Grise Fiord. These Inuit communities in Canada (Nunavut), along with the Inuit of Greenland (Avannaata) rely on the abundance of marine life in North Water for their food, clothing, shelter, and essential cultural and economic well-being.

There is evidence that the North Water was visited by the Vikings in southern Greenland in the 13th century. It wasn't until 1616 that the Discovery, captained by Robert Bylot and piloted by William Baffin, sailed into this region, naming its landmarks such as Sir Thomas Smith's Bay (now Smith Sound) and Lancaster Sound after those who financed their expeditions. Between the 15th and 19th centuries, European whalers arrived and hunted bowhead whales to the brink of extinction.

== Research ==
Since 1867 the North Water ecosystem has been a favourite study site for Western scientists trying to unlock the oceanographic and biological secrets of Arctic polynyas. Researchers have also conducted intensive studies on the region's response to global climate change because of its mid-Arctic latitude amidst a polar ecosystem warming twice as fast as the rest of the world.

== Formation ==
The North Water Polynya (Pikialasorsuaq/Saqvaaq) is closely connected to Lancaster Sound (Inuktitut ᑕᓪᓗᕈᑎᐅᑉ ᑕᕆᐅᖓ Tallurutiup Tariunga) and the Baffin Bay by a powerful system of ocean currents that directly affect the region's climate and biology. In a sense, the NOW polynya is a result of the merging of three smaller polynya's Smith Sound, Lady Ann Strait, and Lancaster Sound. The West Greenland Current follows that country's coastline and moves warm and salty Atlantic water north, reaching all the way to the North Water Polynya. An upwelling of warmer water in this polynya helps keep it partially ice-free throughout the year, even when the ocean directly north and south is frozen. Another arm of the West Greenland Current reaches into Lancaster Sound, delivering Atlantic waters into the Arctic Ocean and contributing to that area's rich ecology.

== Conservation ==
The lands adjacent to the North Water have been recognized internationally for their importance. In 1974 Denmark created Northeast Greenland National Park, the world's largest national park in northeast Greenland. In 1977 it was designated an international biosphere reserve. Likewise, Canada created Canada's second largest national park, Quttinirpaaq in 1988 on the adjacent Ellesmere Island. Twelve percent of the world's land is protected, but only 1.6 percent of the global ocean area is protected. In a time of increasing Arctic industrial activity the waters of the North Water polynya have not been given any formal protection.

In 1982 the western waters in Lancaster Sound were listed as one of the greatest 188 natural areas in the world, and one of the only sites in the Arctic to get this recognition. Two sites within Lancaster Sound were chosen as the top 219 "The World's Greatest Natural Areas" by international work groups that met from 1980 to 1982. Of the world quality Nearctic sites listed, 31 years later only the two Lancaster Sound sites have not achieved national or provincial protection (nor any IUCN category Level I-VI of protection).

There are presently no World Heritage Sites above the 73rd parallel north. At the 2012 IUCN Conservation Congress in Korea a resolution was passed calling on the International Union for Conservation of Nature (IUCN) to "promote Locally Managed Marine Areas as a socially inclusive approach to meeting area-based conservation and Marine Protected Area targets".

An Indigenous Peoples' Organization membership and voting category was also added at that congress. The only present protection is a 1983 promise by Denmark and Canada to develop "further bilateral cooperation in respect of the protection of the marine environment of the waters lying between Canada and Greenland and of its living resources..".

In April 2016, a special Pikialaorsuaq Commission led by the Inuit Circumpolar Council began collecting input of residents in the High Arctic communities of Canada and Greenland on future protections of the North Water Polynya. In April 2017 a Canadian report entitled “A new Shared Arctic Leadership Model” by Mary Simon recommended that Canada accept the Pikialasorsuaq Commission's recommendation for the creation of an Inuit-led management plan and monitoring process for the entire North Water Polynya and consider recognizing the region as an IPA (Indigenous Protected Area).
