= 100th meridian =

100th meridian may refer to:

- 100th meridian east, a line of longitude east of the Greenwich Meridian
- 100th meridian west, a line of longitude west of the Greenwich Meridian

100th meridian west	100th meridian east
