= Niaqunnguut =

Uninhabited headland in Nunavut, Canada

Coordinates: 72°51′47″N 076°03′40″W

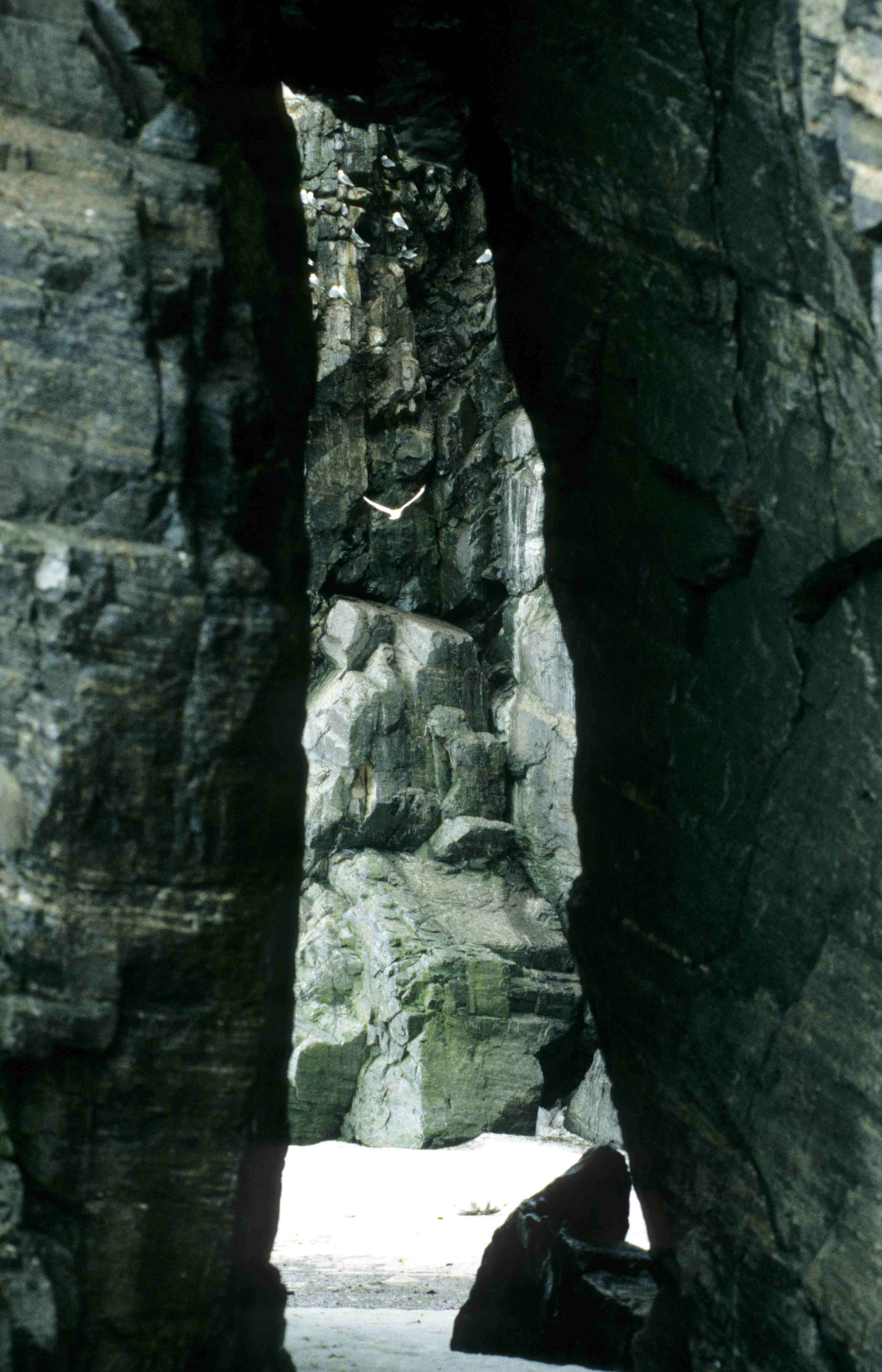
Kittiwakes at Cape Graham Moore

Niaqunnguut (Inuktitut syllabics: ᓂᐊᖁᙴᑦ) formerly Cape Graham Moore, after Vice-Admiral Sir Graham Moore, is an uninhabited headland on Bylot Island in the Qikiqtaaluk Region of Nunavut, Canada. It is located at the island's southeastern tip protruding into Lancaster Sound. The community of Pond Inlet is 70 km (43 mi) to the southwest.

== Geography ==
The habitat is characterized by rocky shores and coastal cliffs that reach an elevation of 150 m (490 ft) above sea level.

== Conservation ==
The cape is a Canadian Important Bird Area (#NU068), an International Biological Program site (#7-5), Key Marine Habitat site (#15), and Key Migratory Bird Terrestrial Habitat site. Other IBAs on the island include Cape Hay and Southwest Bylot Plain. The cape is part of the Bylot Island Migratory Bird Sanctuary.

== Avifauna ==
Notable bird species include the black-legged kittiwake and thick-billed murre, both of which are colonial seabirds. The area is also frequented by bowhead whales, narwhals, polar bears, harp seals, and beluga whales.
