= Pisiktarfik Island =

Island in Nunavut, Canada

- Location within Nunavut Location within Canada

Geography
- Location: Northern Canada
- Coordinates: 72°58′33″N 80°05′00″W
- Archipelago: Arctic Archipelago

Administration
- Canada
- Territory: Nunavut
- Region: Qikiqtaaluk

Demographics
- Population: Uninhabited

Pisiktarfik Island is a member of the Arctic Archipelago in the territory of Nunavut. Located at the confluence of Tremblay Sound and Eclipse Sound, it is an irregularly shaped island located near Alfred Point, Baffin Island.
