= Cambridge Point =

Headland on Coburg Island

Coordinates: 75°47′59″N 079°23′59″W

Cambridge Point is an uninhabited headland on Coburg Island in the Qikiqtaaluk Region of Nunavut, Canada. It is located off Marina Peninsula.

== Geography ==
Characterized by prominent coastline cliffs, open sea, rocky shores, and tundra habitats, the point's elevation ranges from 0 to 300 m (0 to 984 ft) above sea level. It is 6 km^{2} (2.3 sq mi) in size.

== Conservation ==
The point is a Canadian Important Bird Area (#NU010). A portion of Cambridge Point is also contained within the Nirjutiqavvik (Coburg Island) National Wildlife Area.

== Fauna ==
The area is frequented by bowhead whale, narwhal, polar bear, seal, walrus, and white whale.

Notable bird species include:

- Black guillemot
- Black-legged kittiwake
- Glaucous gull
- Northern fulmar
- Thick-billed murre
