= Nirjutiqavvik National Wildlife Area =

National Wildlife Area site in Nunavut, Canada

- IUCN category Ib (wilderness area)
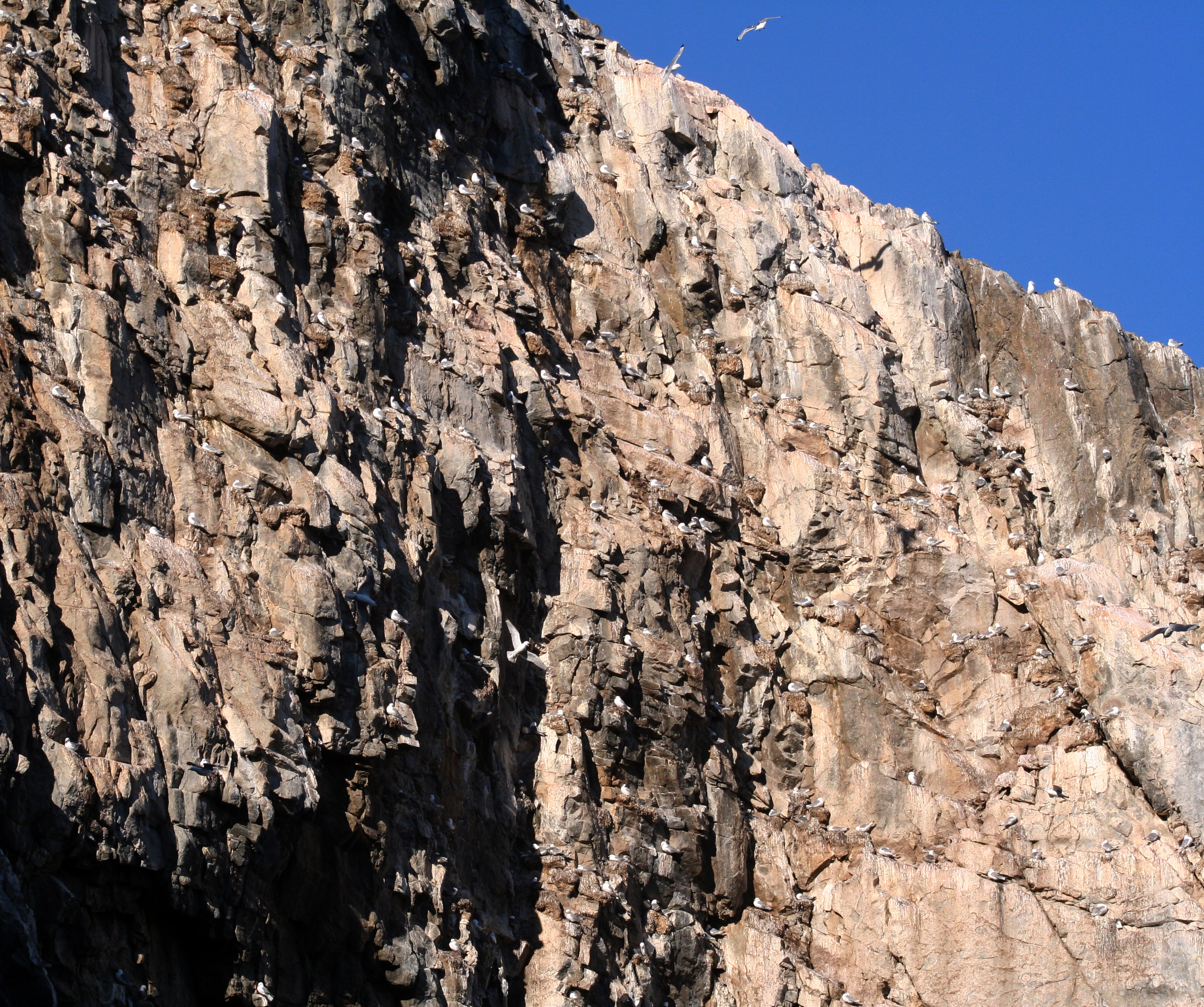
- Rissa tridactyla nesting/flying at Coburg Island in Jones Sound. One Uria lomvia on cliff top (see annotation).

- Location within Nunavut Location within Canada
- Location: Coburg Island, Qikiqtaaluk, Nunavut, Canada
- Nearest city: Grise Fiord
- Coordinates: 75°55′12″N 79°15′00″W
- Area: 1,650 km^{2} (640 sq mi)
- Established: 1995

Nirjutiqavvik National Wildlife Area is a National Wildlife Area on Coburg Island within the Qikiqtaaluk Region, Nunavut, Canada. It is located in Baffin Bay's Lady Ann Strait between Ellesmere Island, to the north, and Devon Island to the south. The NWA includes Coburg Island and its surrounding marine area.

Established in 1995, it is 1,650 km^{2} (640 sq mi) in area. Of this, a total of 1,283 km^{2} (495 sq mi) make up a marine area with marine and intertidal components.

The NWA is one of the most important seabird nesting areas in the Canadian Arctic for black guillemot, black-legged kittiwake, northern fulmar, and thick-billed murre. It is also an important area for polar bears, walruses, ringed, and bearded seals. Narwhal and beluga whales migrate through the area.

The Nirjutiqavvik National Wildlife Area is home to many seabird species and marine animals, providing essential nutrients to nearby Indigenous communities. The wildlife area is managed by Inuit from Grise Fiord, a nearby community, along with other governmental entities. If business as usual continues, climate change and human activity will cause severe damage to the Nirjutiqavvik National Wildlife Area.

== Description ==
The Nirjutiqavvik National Wildlife Area (NNWA) is positioned 20 km (12 mi) off the south of Ellesmere Island in the eastern Jones Sound of Nunavut. The Arctic Ocean is within a 10 km (6.2 mi) radius of the island, which contains Coburg Island and the Princess Charlotte Monument. The sanctuary is approximately 1,642 km^{2} (634 sq mi). Geographically, Coburg Island comprises upland Canadian Shield terrain, coastal lowlands in the northwest, and Davis Highlands. Glaciers and ice fields obscure 65 per cent of the island. The other 35 per cent consists of mountainous highlands with an elevation of 800 m (2,600 ft), which is similar to the conditions of the Princess Charlotte Monument.

== Management ==
In 1995 the Nirjutiqavvik National Wildlife Area was designed to protect and conserve seabirds and marine mammals. The Canadian Wildlife Service (CWS) of Environment and Climate Change Canada (ECCC), and Inuit from Grise Fiord, co-manage the Wildlife Area as the Nirjutiqavvik Area Co-Management Committee (ACMC). The management was established in the Nunavut Settlement Area under the Inuit Impact and Benefit Agreement (IIBA) for National Wildlife Areas and Migratory Bird Sanctuaries. The ACMC is responsible for all policy decisions, permits, research, visitor use, and protection of Nirjutiqavvik National Wildlife Area's habitat and species.

The management of the Wildlife Area as per articles of the currently established IIBA with respect to the Nunavut Land Claims Agreement (NCLA) requires the ACMC to keep the consideration and interest of all Inuit parties and peoples into account for all discussion and deliberation towards the NWAs and MBSs as per Article 3.2.20 (Nunavut Tunngavik Incorporated (NTI), 2016). Article 3.3.5 also states that the policies proposed for NWAs and MBSs by the Canadian Government's Minister of Environment must hear the council of the ACMC relevant to the issues that those policies affect. These articles, in unison, allow Nunavut's Inuit to have a voice in the management and policies of NWAs and MBSs. The Inuit people's rights for land use pertain to Articles 5.2.1 and 5.2.2. They allow for Inuit to uphold the unrestricted right for all Inuit to have access to NWAs and MBSs to hunt the wildlife of the region without "any form of licence, permit, tax or fee under the CWA or the MBCA" (NTI, 2016). In conjunction to those two articles of the IIBA, any motions to restrict the Inuit of their right to harvest in any way from the CWS must "consult NTI and the relevant ACMC to find means other than regulation to resolve disputes regarding such activities" (NTI, 2016).

== Inuit ==
Nirjutiqavvik is the Inuktitut word for "the place of animals". Although no Indigenous people currently reside in the Nirjutiqavvik National Wildlife Area, the robust wildlife in the area makes it a special place for nearby Inuit communities. The Indigenous population at Grise Fiord, Canada's most northerly public community, located on southern Ellesmere island (approximately 100 km (62 mi) away), harvest much of their food from the sea, relying heavily on marine animals in the Nirjutiqavvik National Wildlife Area. According to the Nunavut Agreement in Nunavut, only Nunavut Inuit can hunt wildlife. This includes the collection of eggs and feathers of migratory birds for economic, social, and cultural needs. Nunavut Inuit have the free and unrestricted right of access to harvest all lands, waters, and marine areas within the Nirjutiqavvik National Wildlife Area as per article 5 of the IIBA and subject to s.5.7.18 of the Nunavut Land Claims Agreement.

== Species ==
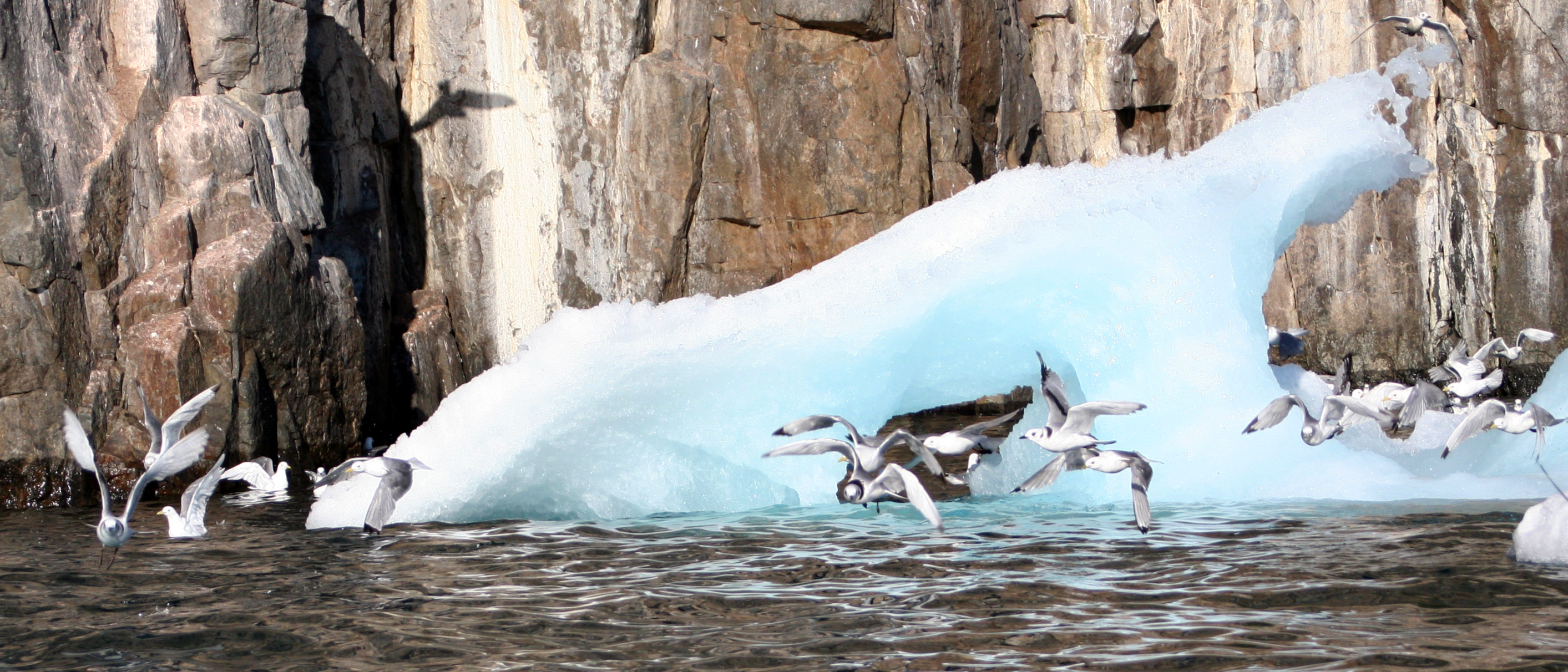
Black-legged kittiwake nesting at Coburg Island in Jones Sound

The Nirjutiqavvik National Wildlife Area is home to keystone species like the thick-billed murre, black-legged kittiwake, and northern fulmar. The richness of the seabird population contributes to a primary reason why the protected area was created. Nirjutiqavvik National Wildlife Area contains 11 per cent of Canada's thick-billed murres breeding population and 16 per cent of the black-legged kittiwakes. About 385,000 seabirds nest on the steep coastal cliffs in Nirjutiqavvik.

The following species of seabird breed in Nirjutiqavvik National Wildlife Area:

- Atlantic puffin
- Northern fulmar
- Glaucous gull
- Black guillemot
- Common eider
- Long-tailed ducks

Canada's Species at Risk Act (SARA) lists the ivory gull, red knot, and polar bear as species at risk. The Nirjutiqavvik National Wildlife Area is protected under Canadian law, which helps these species recover in the region. A number of marine animals inhabit the waters of the Nirjutiqavvik National Wildlife Area, such as polar bears, walruses, belugas, narwhals, bowhead whales, and seals.

== Climate change and other threats ==
Climate change is a concerning threat to the Nirjutiqavvik National Wildlife Area. The Earth's atmosphere has warmed by 1.5 °C (2.7 °F) since 1900 and continues to increase. Nirjutiqavvik glaciers and ice sheets are vulnerable to melting and contributing to the rising sea level, compromising the habitat of the species in the area. Global sea level has increased 15–25 cm (5.9–9.8 in), or 1–2 mm (0.039–0.079 in) per year on average between 1901 and 2018 and continues to accelerate. The National Snow and Ice Data Center reports that Arctic sea ice extent has declined by more than 30 per cent since 1979. Precipitation patterns are shifting and have increased by about 5 to 20 per cent during the last 50 years. The ocean is a significant sink of fossil fuel emissions, and its pH levels are estimated to increase by 0.5 units in 2100. The greater the average temperatures and change in precipitation patterns invite invasive species into new ecosystems. All effects of climate change create stress upon the Nirjutiqavvik ecosystems due to the destruction of the environment.

Human-induced hazards also threaten the wildlife area, such as commercial fisheries, military activity, mineral and hydrocarbon exploration, research, tourism, and marine transport. Without laws and regulations that protect the land and animals, these activities could cause serious harm to the environment, Indigenous communities, and wildlife populations that inhabit the Nirjutiqavvik National Wildlife Area.

== Other designations ==
Other conservation designations include International Biological Program site, Key Migratory Bird Terrestrial Habitat site (1984), Key Marine Habitat Area (2002), and Canadian Important Bird Area.

== See also ==
- List of National Wildlife Areas in Canada
