= Navy Board Inlet =

Body of water in Nunavut Province, Canada

Coordinates: 73°13′N 80°42′W

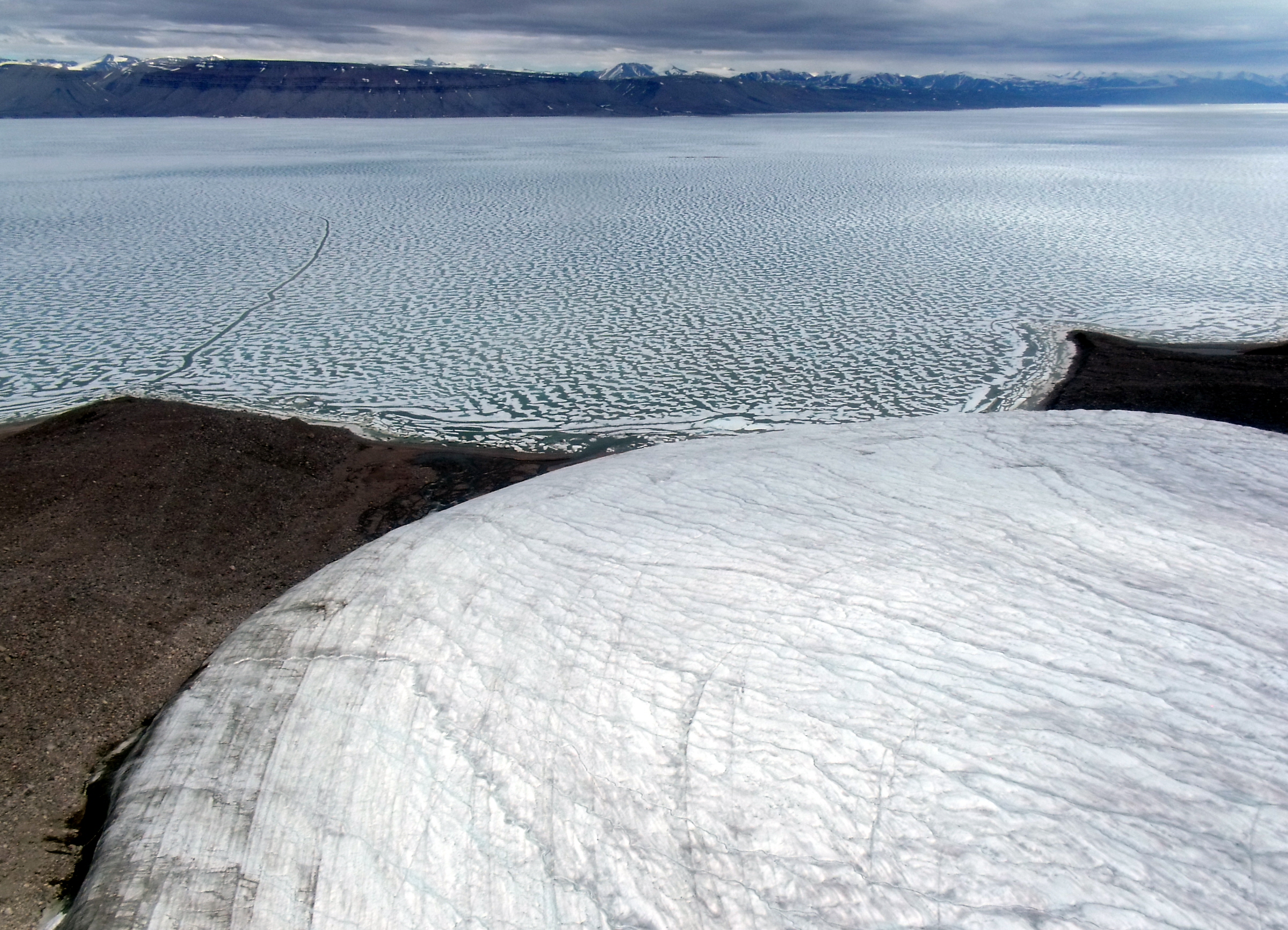
Navy Board Inlet (water)

Navy Board Inlet location

Navy Board Inlet is a body of water in Nunavut's Qikiqtaaluk Region. It is an arm of Lancaster Sound, after which it proceeds southerly before it empties into Eclipse Sound. It is 113 km (70 mi) long and 10 to 29 km (6.2 to 18.0 mi) wide.

The inlet separates Baffin Island to the west from Bylot Island to the east, making it part of the Sirmilik National Park. There are a few islands within Navy Board Inlet, including the Wollaston Islands.

== History ==
The first European to visit Navy Board Inlet was Admiral Sir Edward Parry in 1819.

== In literature ==
Navy Board Inlet is the setting for Rudyard Kipling's story "Quiquern", in The Second Jungle Book.
