= Stephens Island (Nunavut) =

Island in Nunavut, Canada

- Location within Nunavut Location within Canada

Geography
- Location: Northern Canada
- Coordinates: 72°10′N 80°38′W
- Archipelago: Arctic Archipelago

Administration
- Canada
- Territory: Nunavut
- Region: Qikiqtaaluk

Demographics
- Population: Uninhabited

Stephens Island is a member of the Arctic Archipelago in the territory of Nunavut. Located in Milne Inlet just north of Koluktoo Bay, it is an irregularly shaped island off the Baffin Island coast.
