= Coburg Island =

Island in Canada

Native name: Nirjutiqavvik
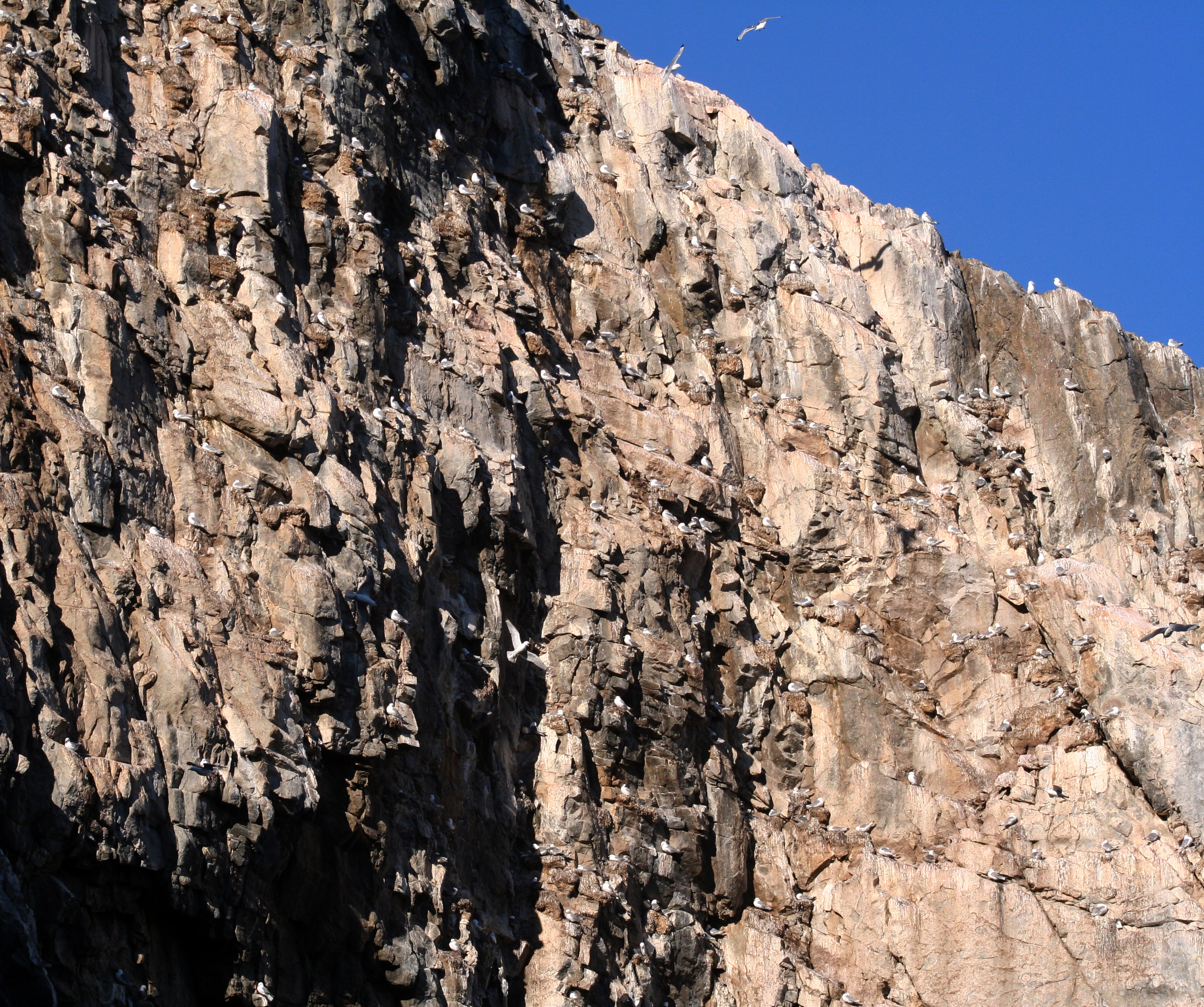
- Seabirds nesting at Coburg Island

- Location within Nunavut Location within Canada

Geography
- Location: Lady Ann Strait
- Coordinates: 75°57′N 79°18′W
- Archipelago: Arctic Archipelago
- Area: 411 km^{2} (159 sq mi)
- Length: 38 km (23.6 mi)
- Width: 22–24 km (14–15 mi)
- Highest elevation: 800 m (2600 ft)
- Highest point: Unnamed

Administration
- Canada
- Nunavut: Nunavut
- Region: Qikiqtaaluk

Demographics
- Population: Uninhabited

Coburg Island (Inuktitut: Nirjutiqavvik) is an uninhabited island in Qikiqtaaluk, Nunavut, Canada. It is one of the members of Queen Elizabeth Islands located in Baffin Bay's Lady Ann Strait. It is separated from Ellesmere Island by Glacier Strait; Devon Island is to the south.

Elsewhere in Nunavut, there is also a tiny Saxe-Coburg Island, lying in Davis Strait, south of Leopold Island, itself east of Baffin Island's Cape Mercy (Cumberland Peninsula).

== Geography ==
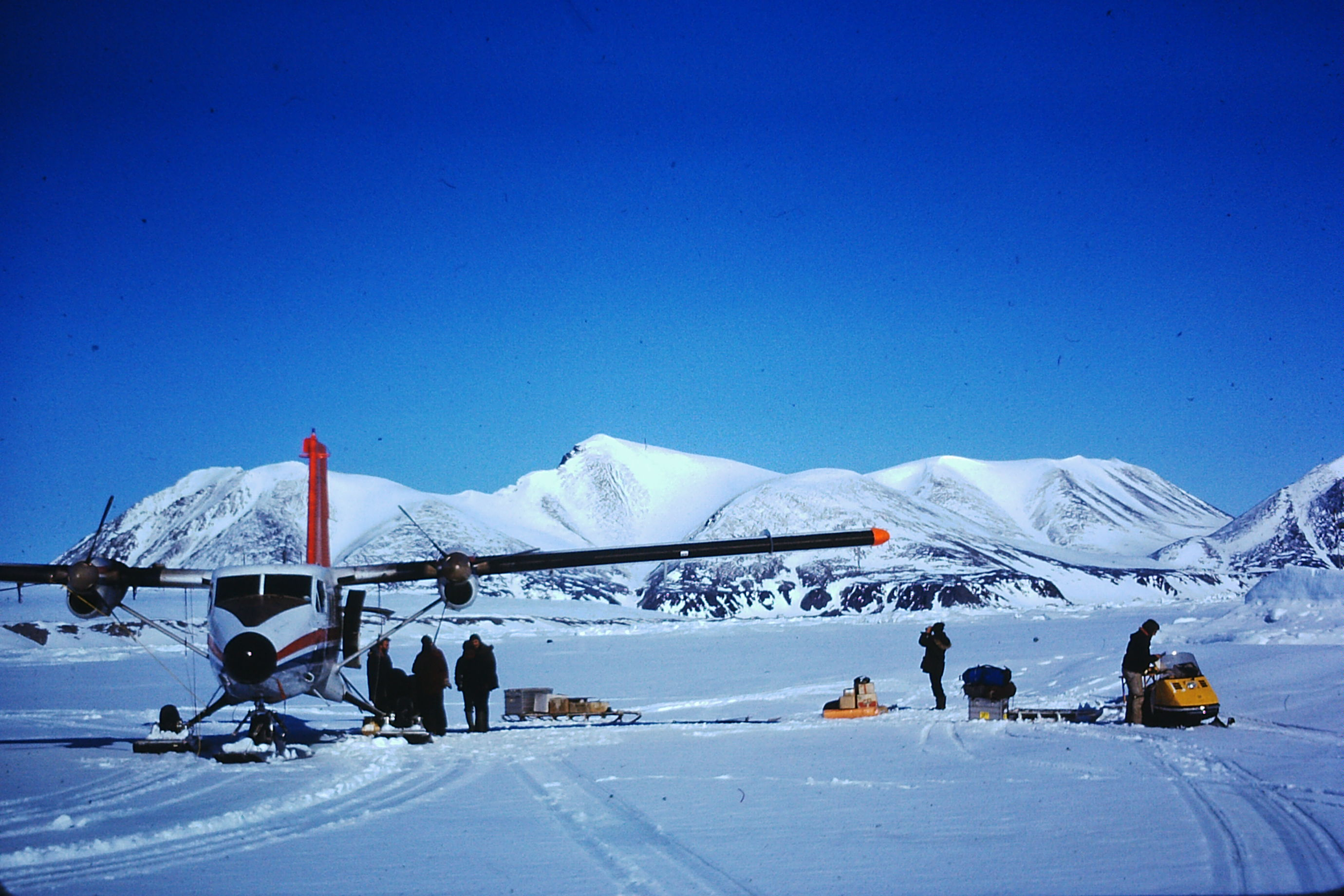
Twin Otter STOL plane brings logistic support to research station on Coburg Island, June 6, 1975

The island is characterized by cliffs, rocky shores, and tundra.

== Fauna ==
Bowhead whale, narwhal, polar bear, seal, walrus, and white whale frequent the area.

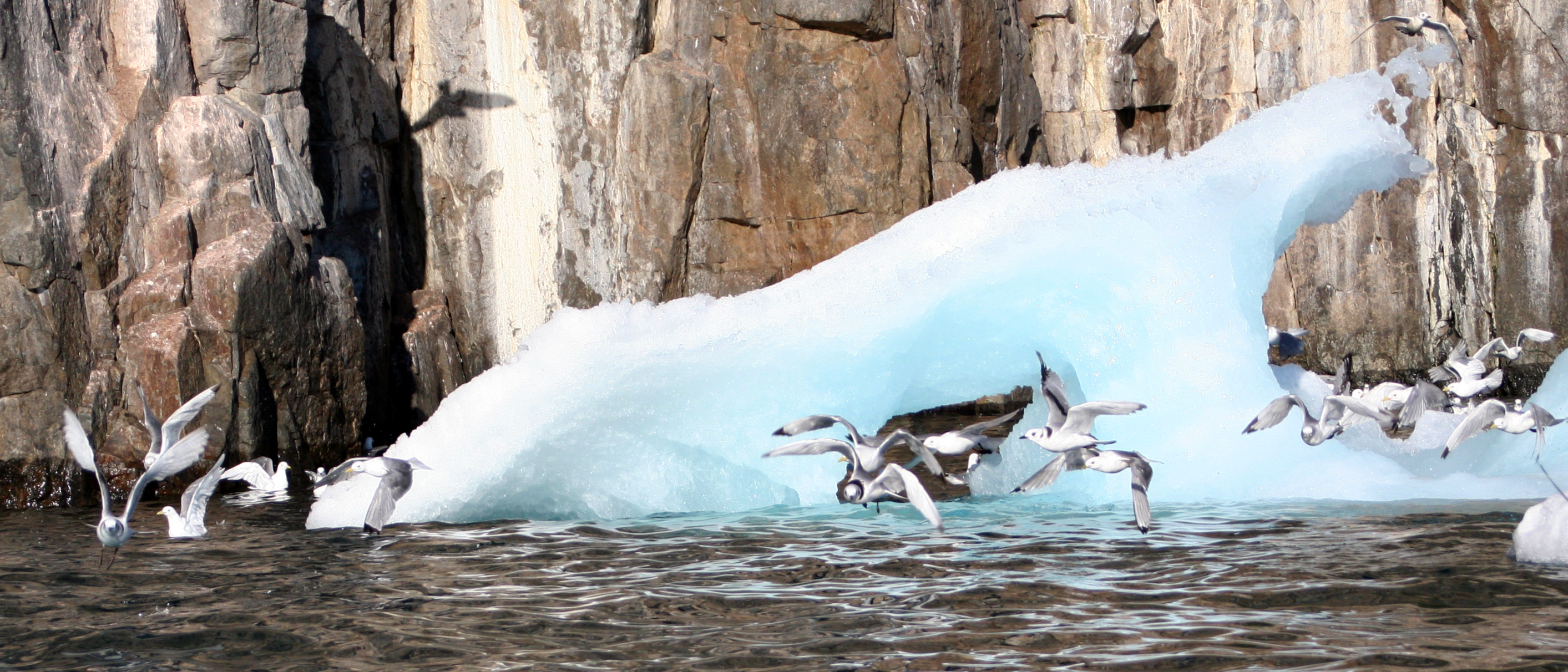
Seabirds and iceberg at Coburg Island

== Conservation ==
Coburg Island has several designated conservation classifications including International Biological Program site and Key Migratory Bird Terrestrial Habitat site. Along with the surrounding marine area, the island is a part of the Nirjutiqavvik National Wildlife Area.

Cambridge Point, off of the southeastern Marina Peninsula, is a Canadian Important Bird Area notable for black guillemot, black-legged kittiwake, glaucous gull, northern fulmar, and thick-billed murre. A portion of Cambridge Point is within the NWA.
