= Imiliit =

Island in Nunavut, Canada

- Location within Nunavut Location within Canada

Geography
- Location: Northern Canada
- Coordinates: 72°29′51″N 080°00′17″W
- Archipelago: Arctic Archipelago

Administration
- Canada
- Territory: Nunavut
- Region: Qikiqtaaluk

Demographics
- Population: Uninhabited

Imiliit (Inuktitut syllabics: ᐃᒥᓖᑦ formerly Ragged Island is an uninhabited island, and a member of the Arctic Archipelago in the Qikiqtaaluk Region, Nunavut. Located in Tasiujaq at the mouth of Milne Inlet, it is an irregularly shaped island off the Baffin Island coast.

Another, smaller Ragged Island is found in Chesterfield Inlet, northwest of Big Island.
