= Mumiksaa =

Canadian island

Native name: ᒧᒥᒃᓵ
- Location within Nunavut Location within Canada

Geography
- Location: Eclipse Sound
- Coordinates: 72°18′58″N 78°57′36″W
- Archipelago: Arctic Archipelago

Administration
- Canada
- Nunavut: Nunavut
- Region: Qikiqtaaluk

Demographics
- Population: Uninhabited

Mumiksaa (Inuktitut: ᒧᒥᒃᓵ), formerly Frechette Island, is a member of the Arctic Archipelago in the territory of Nunavut. Located in Tasiujaq at the mouth of Tay Sound, it is a long and narrow island, approximately 1 km (0.62 mi) off the Baffin Island coast. Qimivvik lies to its north.
