= Buchan Gulf =

Arctic fjord on Baffin Island

- Location in Nunavut
- Location: Arctic
- Coordinates: 71°49′48″N 074°30′00″W
- Ocean/sea sources: Baffin Bay
- Basin countries: Nunavut, Canada
- Surface area: 22 km^{2} (8.5 sq mi)

Buchan Gulf is an isolated, elongated Arctic fjord on Baffin Island's northeastern coast in the Qikiqtaaluk Region of Nunavut, Canada. The Inuit settlement of Pond Inlet is 200 km (120 mi) to the north.

== Geography ==
Characterized by open sea, coastal cliffs, and rocky marine shores, the gulf stretches 22 km^{2} (8.5 sq mi) with an elevation ranging up to 600 m (2,000 ft) above sea level.

== Fauna ==
It is a Canadian Important Bird Area (#NU069), an International Biological Program site (Region 9, #7-11), and a Key Migratory Bird Terrestrial Habitat site. There is a sizeable population of northern fulmars. Megafauna which can be seen in the water include polar bears, walruses, and narwhals.
