= United States Marine Mammal Program =

The United States Marine Mammal Program is an organization developed by the United States National Committee and the International Marine Mammal Working Group of the International Biological Program in 1969, for the study of marine mammals.

The United States Marine Mammal program was directed by an eleven member Marine Mammal Council (MMC) that was appointed by the United States Marine Mammal Working Group. Daily operations were overseen by a four member Executive committee that was named by the MMC.

Some notable things the MMC did include aiding in the development of a Marine Mammal Study Center at the Smithsonian, publishing the Marine Mammal Newsletter, sponsoring marine mammal conferences, and coordinating existing and new research through its research program.
