= Polynya =

Area of unfrozen sea within an ice pack

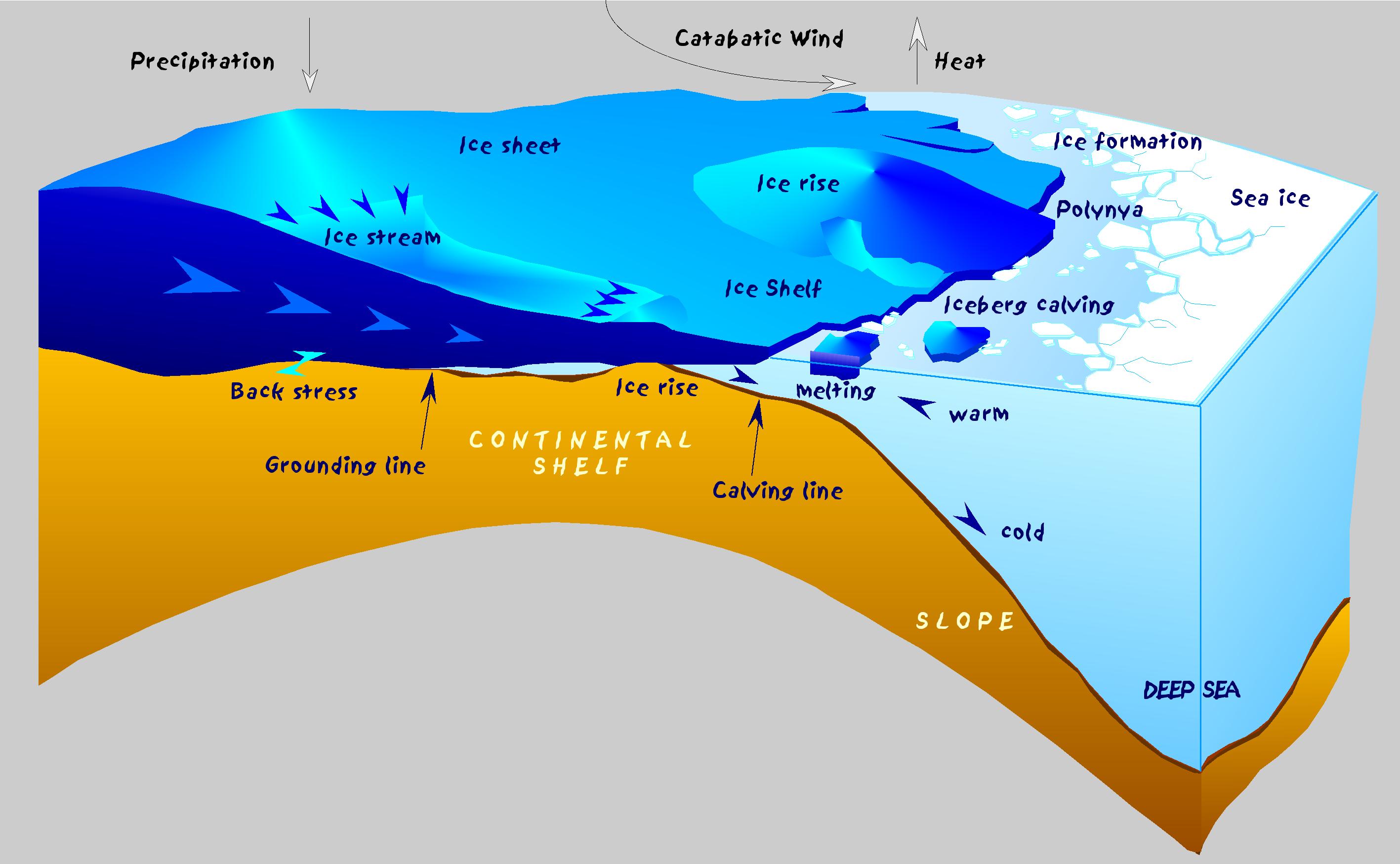
Coastal polynyas are produced in the Antarctic by katabatic winds

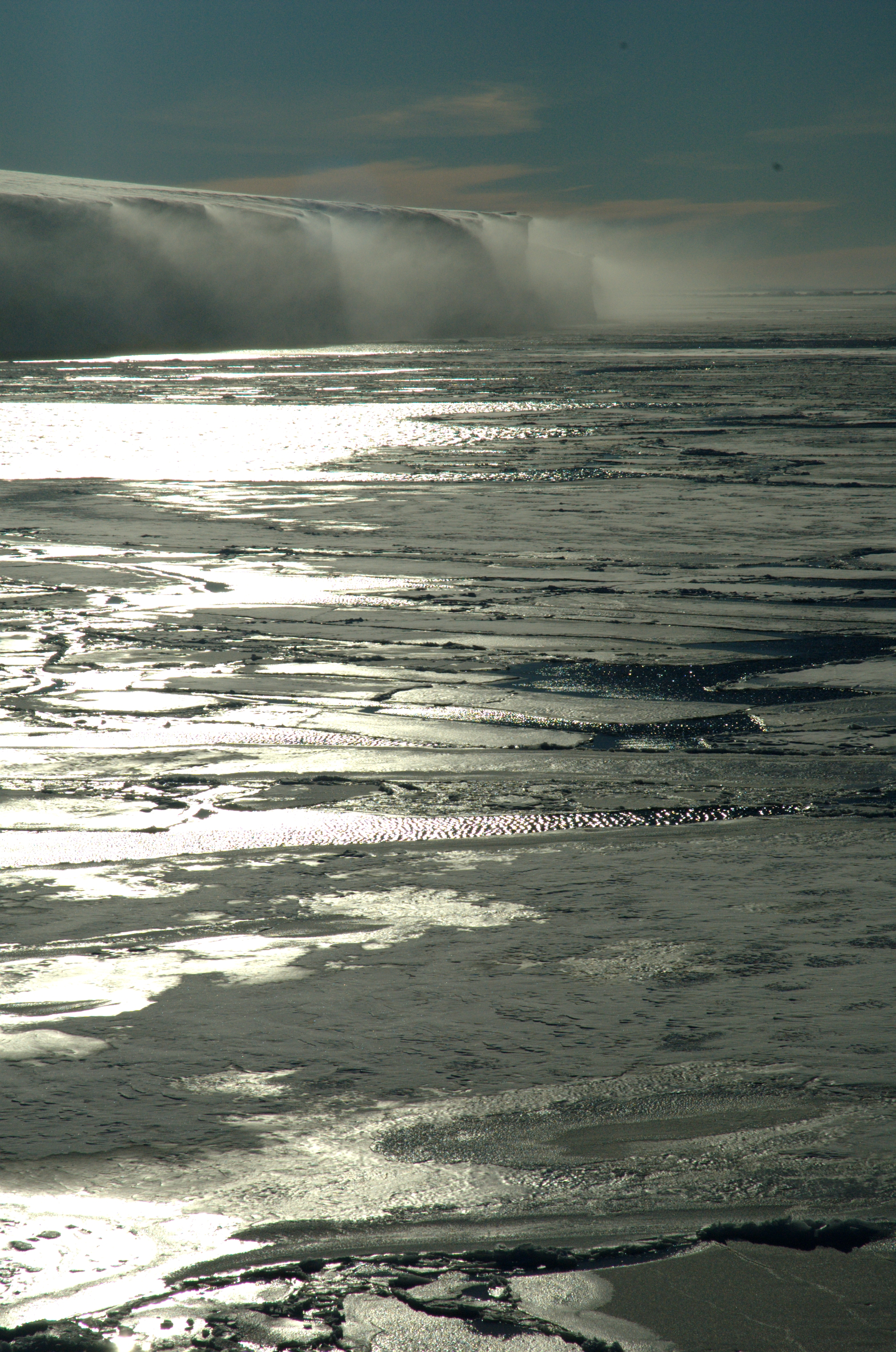
Katabatic wind spilling off an ice shelf

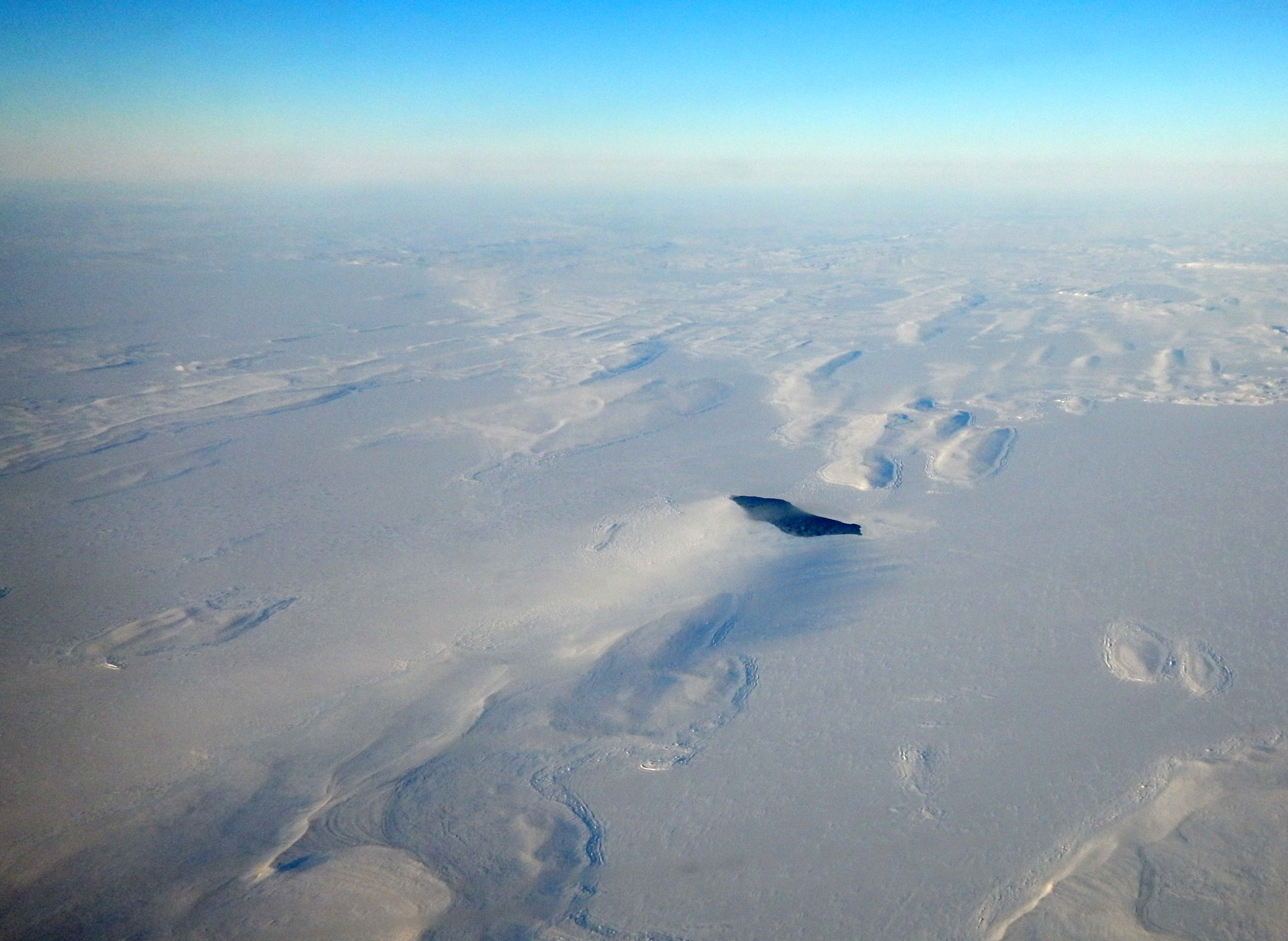
A frosty Arctic condensation plume marks this polynya near the west shore of Hudson Bay. This one (and others nearby) are likely kept open by tidal currents. Mile-high west-facing aerial view.

A polynya (/pəˈlɪnjə/) is an area of open water surrounded by sea ice. It is now used as a geographical term for an area of unfrozen seawater within otherwise contiguous pack ice or fast ice. It is a loanword from the Russian word polynya (полынья; IPA: [pəɫɨˈnʲja]), which refers to a natural ice hole and was adopted in the 19th century by polar explorers to describe navigable portions of the sea.

There are two main types of polynyas: coastal polynyas, which can be found year-round near the Antarctic and Arctic coasts and are mainly created by strong winds pushing the ice away from the coast, and mid-sea or open-ocean polynyas, which may be found more sporadically in the middle of ice pack in certain locations, especially around Antarctica. These locations are generally preconditioned by certain oceanic dynamics.

One of the most famous mid-sea polynyas is the Weddell Polynya, also known as the Maud Rise Polynya, which occurs in the Lazarev Sea over the Maud Rise seamount. It was first spotted in September 1973, persisted through multiple winters (1974–1976), and recently recurred in September 2017.

== Formation ==
Coastal polynyas are formed through two main processes:

- A sensible heat polynya is thermodynamically driven, and typically occurs when warm water upwelling keeps the surface water temperature at or above the freezing point. This reduces ice production and may stop it altogether.
- A latent heat polynya is formed through the action of katabatic winds, which act to drive ice away from a fixed boundary such as a coastline, fast ice, or an ice bridge. The polynya forms initially when first-year pack ice is driven away from the coast, which leaves an area of open water within which new ice is formed. This new ice is then also herded downwind toward the first-year pack ice. When it reaches the pack ice, the new ice is consolidated onto the pack ice. This process continues over time. Latent heat polynyas are therefore a major source of sea ice production in the Antarctic.

Latent heat polynyas are regions of high ice production and therefore are possible sites of dense water production in both polar regions. The high ice production rates within these polynyas leads to a large amount of brine rejection into the surface waters; this salty water then sinks. It is an open question as to whether the polynyas of the Arctic can produce enough dense water to form a major portion of the dense water required to drive the thermohaline circulation.

Mid-sea polynyas are formed when specific atmospheric conditions occur over preconditioned oceanographic areas. Such atmospheric conditions should favor ice drift in opposite directions to open the ice pack. Polar cyclones are a typical atmospheric trigger for the occurrence of mid-sea polynyas as the cyclonic winds push the ice in opposite directions away from the cyclone center. Also, cold fronts, where two opposite flows in direction are found, are ideal for creating a mid-sea polynya.

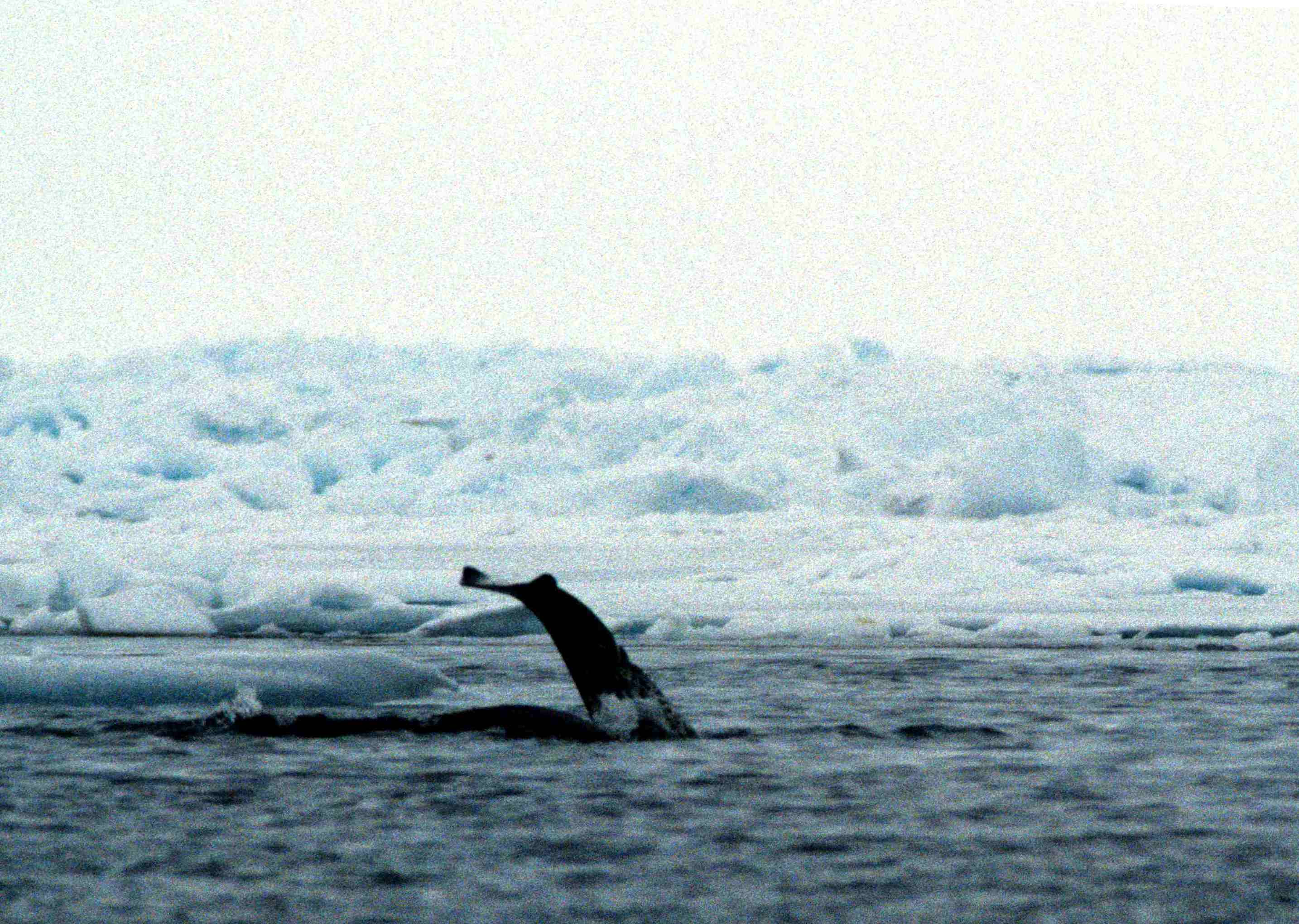
The flukes of a narwhal in a Baffin Bay polynya

=== Antarctic bottom water ===
Antarctic bottom water (AABW) is the dense water with high salinity that exists in the abyssal layer of the Southern Ocean. It plays a major role in the global overturning circulation. Coastal polynyas (latent heat polynyas) are a source of AABW as brine rejection during the formation of sea ice at these polynyas increases the salinity of the seawater, which then sinks down to the ocean bottom as AABW. Antarctic polynyas form when ice masses diverge from the coast and move away in the direction of the wind, creating an exposed area of sea water which subsequently freezes over, with brine rejection, to form another mass of ice.

== Ecology ==
Some polynyas, such as the North Water Polynya between Canada and Greenland, occur seasonally at the same time and place each year. Because animals can adapt their life strategies to this regularity, these types of polynyas are of special ecological research significance. In winter, marine mammals such as walruses, narwhals, and belugas that do not migrate south remain there. Polar bears are known to be able to swim as far as 65 kilometres (35 nautical miles) across open waters of a polynya.

=== Polynya blooms ===
The presence of open water in an otherwise ice-covered area can result in a localized marine algal bloom, also referred to as a polynya bloom. While algal communities are often found under sea ice, as evidenced by ice algae, the rate of phytoplankton growth is substantially higher in the open water of a polynya. The primary drivers of polynya blooms are sunlight and nutrients. Specifically, the lack of sea ice allows light, a necessary component for photosynthesis, to penetrate deeper into the water and enable elevated phytoplankton growth compared to the surrounding ice-covered waters. Furthermore, polynya formation is typically associated with upwelling, a process that transports nutrient-rich water from the ocean bottom towards the surface. This influx of nutrients coupled with increased light levels often results in polynya blooms.

=== Biological production ===
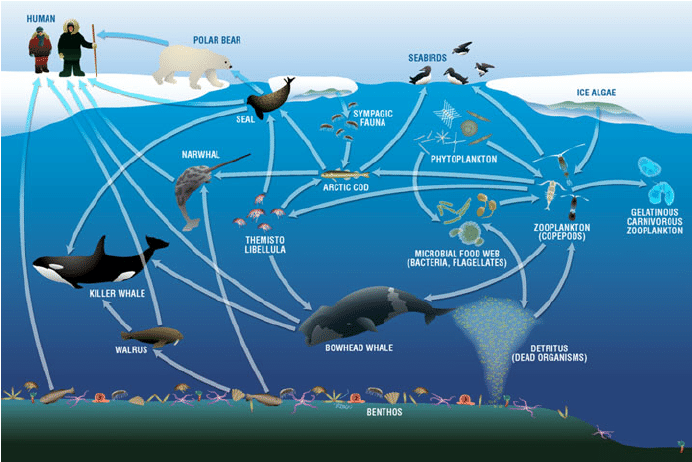
A depiction of an Arctic marine food web. The phytoplankton, the base of the food web, are able to grow due to the polynya in the sea ice above them.

In general, polynyas tend to be more biologically productive as a result of containing more phytoplankton than the surrounding water. Therefore, due to the role of primary producers as the foundation of the marine food web, polynyas are a critical food source for a variety of organisms such as fish, birds, and marine mammals. Listed below are several examples of the importance of polynyas to polar communities.

- Increased seal mortality rates were observed during years when the Ross Sea Polynya did not open.
- In eastern Antarctica, 91% of Adélie penguin colonies are linked to a coastal polynya, where polynya size often correlates to colony size.
- The presence of polynyas in McMurdo Sound provides an ice-free area where penguins can feed, directly effecting the survival of the Cape Royds penguin colony.
- The downward transport of carbon (in the form of marine snow) from the surface to the seafloor associated with polynya blooms provides the nutrients necessary to sustain rich benthic communities.

== Human dependency ==
Polynyas have also supported human populations throughout history. For example, the North Water Polynya, the largest and most biologically productive Arctic polynya, serves as a critical source of food in an otherwise barren region, enabling the existence of high-latitude human communities in the region for thousands of years. It may have served as a stepping stone for the original settlers of Greenland as they traversed through what is now northern Canada 4500 years ago. There are also indications that the North Water Polynya has aided Thule, Inuit, Norse, and western explorers throughout history. Today, the North Water Polynya enables the existence of Greenland's northernmost towns, such as Qaanaaq, Qeqertat, Savissivik and Siorapaluk.

== Arctic navigation ==
When submarines of the U.S. Navy made expeditions to the North Pole in the 1950s and 1960s, there was significant concern about surfacing through the thick pack ice of the Arctic Ocean. In 1962, both the USS Skate and USS Seadragon surfaced within the same large polynya near the North Pole for the first polar rendezvous of the U.S. Atlantic Fleet and the U.S. Pacific Fleet.

== See also ==
- Lead (sea ice)
