= 100th meridian east =

Line of longitude

100th meridian east

The meridian 100° east of Greenwich is a line of longitude that extends from the North Pole across the Arctic Ocean, Asia, the Indian Ocean, the Southern Ocean, and Antarctica to the South Pole.

The 100th meridian east forms a great circle with the 80th meridian west.

== From Pole to Pole ==
Starting at the North Pole and heading south to the South Pole, the 100th meridian east passes through:

Co-ordinates	Country, territory or sea	Notes
90°0′N 100°0′E	Arctic Ocean	
80°39′N 100°0′E	Laptev Sea	
79°51′N 100°0′E	Russia	Krasnoyarsk Krai — October Revolution Island, Severnaya Zemlya
78°55′N 100°0′E	Kara Sea	
78°16′N 100°0′E	Russia	Krasnoyarsk Krai — Bolshevik Island, Severnaya Zemlya
77°57′N 100°0′E	Kara Sea	
76°27′N 100°0′E	Russia	Krasnoyarsk Krai; Irkutsk Oblast — from 58°4′N 100°0′E; Republic of Buryatia — from 53°19′N 100°0′E
51°45′N 100°0′E	Mongolia	
42°39′N 100°0′E	People's Republic of China	Inner Mongolia; Gansu — from 40°55′N 100°0′E; Inner Mongolia — from 40°17′N 100°0′E; Gansu — from 39°45′N 100°0′E; Qinghai — from 38°17′N 100°0′E; Sichuan — from 32°56′N 100°0′E; Yunnan — from 28°32′N 100°0′E
21°42′N 100°0′E	Myanmar (Burma)	
20°25′N 100°0′E	Thailand	
12°50′N 100°0′E	Gulf of Thailand	
12°13′N 100°0′E	Thailand	
12°10′N 100°0′E	Gulf of Thailand	
9°47′N 100°0′E	Thailand	Islands of Ko Pha Ngan and Ko Samui
9°25′N 100°0′E	Gulf of Thailand	
8°33′N 100°0′E	Thailand	
6°34′N 100°0′E	Strait of Malacca	Passing just east of the Langkawi islands, Malaysia (at 6°18′N 99°56′E); Passing just west of Penang Island, Malaysia (at 5°26′N 100°10′E)
2°43′N 100°0′E	Indonesia	Island of Sumatra
0°29′S 100°0′E	Indian Ocean	
2°31′S 100°0′E	Indonesia	Island of North Pagai
2°51′S 100°0′E	Indian Ocean	
60°0′S 100°0′E	Southern Ocean	
65°39′S 100°0′E	Antarctica	Australian Antarctic Territory, claimed by Australia

Next westward: 99th meridian east	100th meridian east forms a great circle with 80th meridian west	Next eastward: 101st meridian east
