= Long Island (Hudson Bay, Nunavut) =

Uninhabited Canadian island in the Hudson Bay

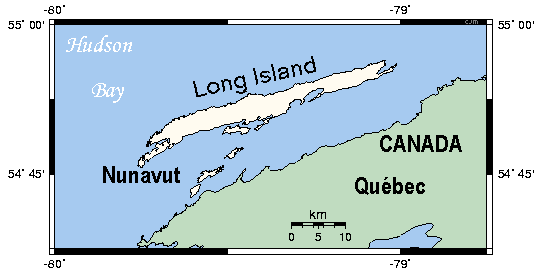
- Long Island, Nunavut

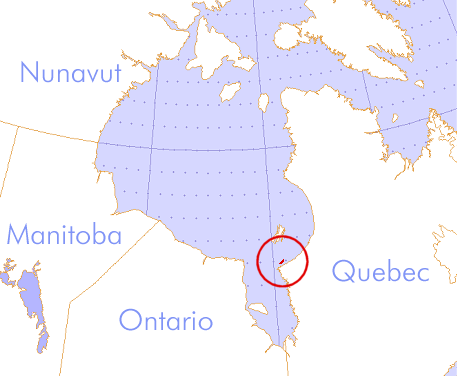
- Location in Hudson Bay

- Location within Nunavut Location within Canada

Geography
- Location: Hudson Bay
- Coordinates: 54°52′N 79°25′W
- Archipelago: Arctic Archipelago
- Area: 168 km^{2} (65 sq mi)

Administration
- Canada
- Nunavut: Nunavut
- Region: Qikiqtaaluk

Demographics
- Population: Uninhabited

Long Island is one of many uninhabited Canadian arctic islands in Qikiqtaaluk Region, Nunavut. It is located in Hudson Bay off the coast of Quebec at 54°52'N 79°25'W and has an area of 168 km^{2} (65 sq mi).
