= Wollaston Islands (Nunavut) =

Island group in Nunavut, Canada

Geography
- Location: Northern Canada
- Coordinates: 73°43′N 80°55′W
- Archipelago: Arctic Archipelago

Administration
- Canada
- Territory: Nunavut
- Region: Qikiqtaaluk

Demographics
- Population: Uninhabited
- Source: Wollaston Islands at Atlas of Canada

The Wollaston Islands are uninhabited members of the Arctic Archipelago in the territory of Nunavut. Located on the east side of the mouth of Navy Board Inlet, the island group is closer to Bylot Island than to Baffin Island.
