= Glacier Strait =

Strait in Nunavut, Canada

- Interactive map of Glacier Strait
- Location: Nunavut, Canada
- Coordinates: 76°10′N 79°15′W
- Type: Strait
- Part of: Arctic Ocean
- Basin countries: Canada

The Glacier Strait is a natural waterway through the Canadian Arctic Archipelago within Qikiqtaaluk Region, Nunavut, Canada. It separates Ellesmere Island (to the north) from Coburg Island (to the south). To the north-east it opens into Baffin Bay, and to the south-west into the Jones Sound.
