= Leopold Island =

Island in Nunavut, Canada

- Location within Nunavut Location within Canada

Geography
- Location: Frobisher Bay
- Coordinates: 64°58′N 63°23′W
- Archipelago: Arctic Archipelago
- Area: 25 km^{2} (9.7 sq mi)

Administration
- Canada
- Nunavut: Nunavut
- Region: Qikiqtaaluk

Demographics
- Population: Uninhabited
- Source: Leopold Island at Atlas of Canada

Leopold Island is an uninhabited island in the Qikiqtaaluk Region of Nunavut, Canada. It is located in the Labrador Sea, east of Cape Mercy at the tip of Baffin Island's Cumberland Peninsula.

Leopold Island is 25 km^{2} (9.7 sq mi) in size.
