= Lady Ann Strait =

Waterway in Jones Sound in the Canadian territory of Nunavut

Coordinates: 75°40′00″N 079°49′59″W

Lady Ann Strait is a waterway in Jones Sound in the Canadian territory of Nunavut. It is 30 km (19 mi) wide at the point between Cape Fitz Roy on Devon Island to the southwest, and Coburg Island to the northeast. The strait empties into northwestern Baffin Bay.
