= 101st meridian east =

Line of longitude

101st meridian east

The meridian 101° east of Greenwich is a line of longitude that extends from the North Pole across the Arctic Ocean, Asia, the Indian Ocean, the Southern Ocean, and Antarctica to the South Pole.

The 101st meridian east forms a great circle with the 79th meridian west.

== From Pole to Pole ==
Starting at the North Pole and heading south to the South Pole, the 101st meridian east passes through:

Co-ordinates	Country, territory or sea	Notes
90°0′N 101°0′E	Arctic Ocean	
80°32′N 101°0′E	Laptev Sea	
78°57′N 101°0′E	Russia	Krasnoyarsk Krai — Bolshevik Island, Severnaya Zemlya
78°6′N 101°0′E	Kara Sea	
76°32′N 101°0′E	Russia	Krasnoyarsk Krai; Irkutsk Oblast — from 57°52′N 101°0′E; Republic of Buryatia — from 52°47′N 101°0′E
51°36′N 101°0′E	Mongolia	
42°38′N 101°0′E	People's Republic of China	Inner Mongolia; Gansu — from 38°59′N 101°0′E; Qinghai — from 37°56′N 101°0′E; Gansu — from 34°22′N 101°0′E; Qinghai — from 33°57′N 101°0′E; Sichuan — from 32°38′N 101°0′E; Yunnan — from 27°23′N 101°0′E
21°42′N 101°0′E	Myanmar (Burma)	
21°23′N 101°0′E	Laos	
19°37′N 101°0′E	Thailand	
17°49′N 101°0′E	Laos	For about 2 km
17°48′N 101°0′E	Thailand	For about 3 km
17°46′N 101°0′E	Laos	For about 4 km
17°44′N 101°0′E	Thailand	For about 13 km
17°37′N 101°0′E	Laos	For about 5 km
17°34′N 101°0′E	Thailand	
12°39′N 101°0′E	Gulf of Thailand	
6°51′N 101°0′E	Thailand	
6°16′N 101°0′E	Malaysia	
5°50′N 101°0′E	Thailand	For about 6 km
5°46′N 101°0′E	Malaysia	Passing just west of Ipoh at 4°37'N
3°39′N 101°0′E	Strait of Malacca	
2°18′N 101°0′E	Indonesia	Island of Sumatra
2°27′S 101°0′E	Indian Ocean	
60°0′S 101°0′E	Southern Ocean	
65°24′S 101°0′E	Antarctica	Australian Antarctic Territory, claimed by Australia

Next westward: 100th meridian east	101st meridian east forms a great circle with 79th meridian west	Next eastward: 102nd meridian east
