= Kangiqłuruluk =

Sound in Nunavut, Canada

- Location within Nunavut
- Location: Qikiqtaaluk Region, Nunavut
- Coordinates: 72°16′49″N 77°54′35″W
- Basin countries: Canada
- Settlements: Uninhabited

Kangiqłuruluk (ᑲᖏᖅᖢᕈᓗᒃ formerly Oliver Sound is an uninhabited natural waterway within Qikiqtaaluk Region, Nunavut, Canada. It is located at the northern end of Baffin Island, north of Tay Sound. Its mouth opens to Tasiujaq. Pond Inlet is the nearest community. The sound makes up part of Sirmilik National Park. There are several alpine glaciers that are near this sound.
