= Spicer Islands =

Island group in Nunavut, Canada

- Location within Nunavut Location within Canada

Geography
- Location: Northern Canada
- Coordinates: 68°25′N 78°50′W

Administration
- Canada
- Territory: Nunavut
- Region: Qikiqtaaluk

Demographics
- Population: Uninhabited
- Source: Spicer Islands at Atlas of Canada

The Spicer Islands are an uninhabited island group located in Foxe Basin, within Qikiqtaaluk Region, in the Canadian territory of Nunavut. The Melville Peninsula is to the west, Prince Charles Island to the east, Rowley Island to the north. The two main islands are North Spicer Island and South Spicer Island. They are very low-lying and swampy.

Another set of (smaller) Spicer Islands lies off the south coast of Baffin Island, in Hudson's Strait, near Wharton Harbour and Chudliasi Bay.

== History ==
In 1631, Captain Luke foxe was sent from England to find a northern shortcut for trade lines with Asian countries. He discovered the Spicer Islands and humorously named them.
