= Tay Sound =

Body of water in Nunavut, Canada

- Location within Nunavut
- Coordinates: 72.101°N 78.998°W
- Basin countries: Canada
- Settlements: Uninhabited

Tay Sound is an uninhabited natural waterway within Qikiqtaaluk Region, Nunavut, Canada. It is located at the northern end of Baffin Island, south of Oliver Sound. Its mouth opens to Eclipse Sound. Pond Inlet is the nearest community.
