= Bylot Island Migratory Bird Sanctuary =

Migratory bird sanctuary in Nunavut, Canada

- IUCN category II (national park)
- Interactive map of Bylot Island Migratory Bird Sanctuary
- Location: Southampton Island, Kivalliq, Nunavut, Canada
- Nearest town: Pond Inlet
- Coordinates: 73°14′58″N 78°35′15″W
- Area: 12,635 km^{2} (4,878 sq mi)
- Established: 1965

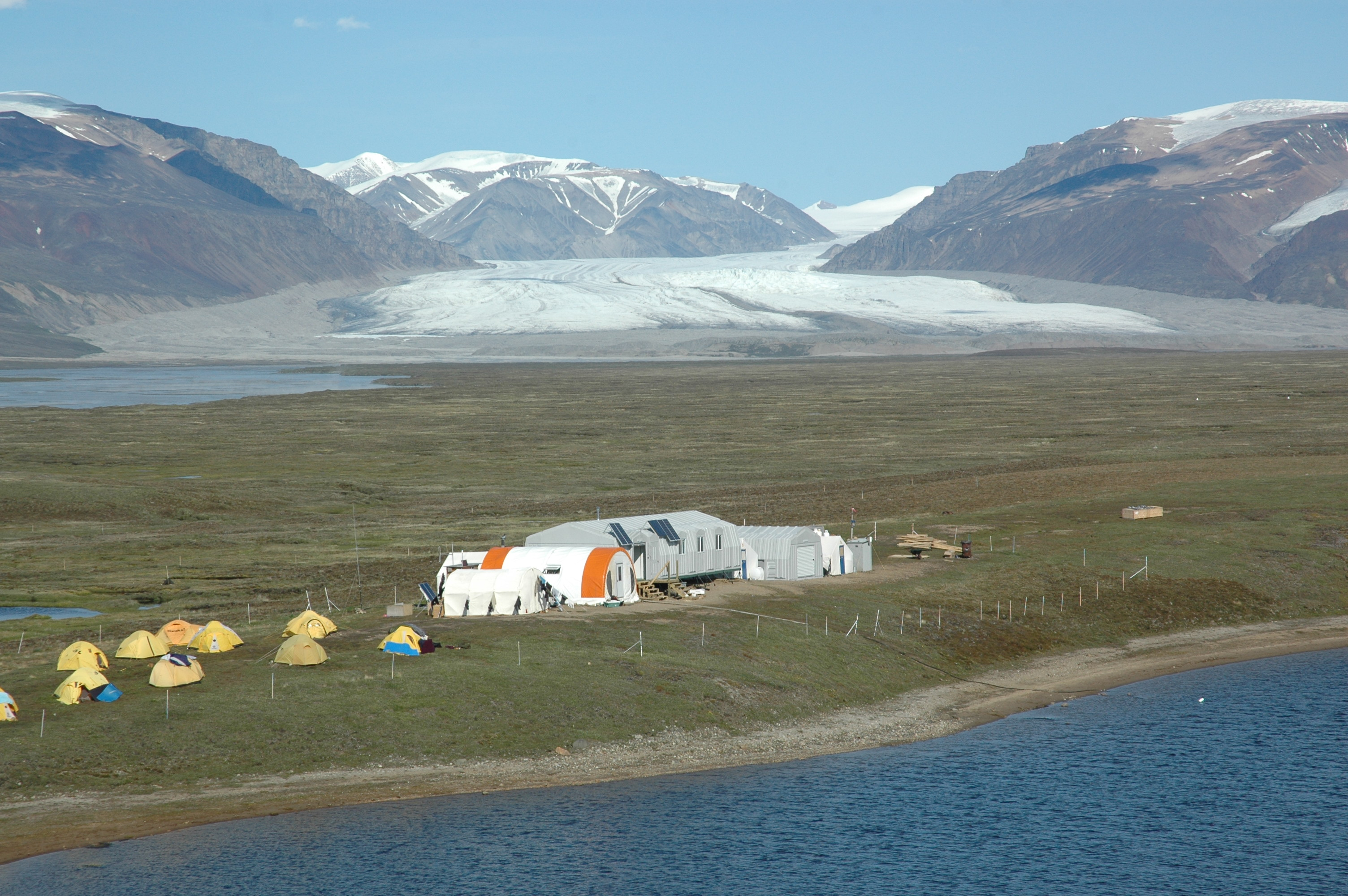
Bylot Island research station in Nunavut

The Bylot Island Migratory Bird Sanctuary is a migratory bird sanctuary in the Qikiqtaaluk Region of Nunavut, Canada. Located on Bylot Island, it was federally designated in 1965, and is classified as Category IV by the International Union for Conservation of Nature. It was created to protect the nesting grounds of thick-billed murre, black-legged kittiwake and greater snow goose. At 1,282,731 ha (3,169,700 acres), it is Nunavut's second largest MBS after the Ahiak Migratory Bird Sanctuary (formerly the Queen Maud Gulf Migratory Bird Sanctuary). Of its overall size, 176,515 ha (436,180 acres) is a marine area, with marine, intertidal, and subtidal components.

== Other designations ==
The sanctuary is a part of three Canadian Important Bird Areas: Niaqunnguut (Cape Graham Moore), Cape Hay, and Southwest Bylot. Part of it is also included in the Sirmilik National Park.
