= Jones Sound =

Waterway in Qikiqtaaluk, Nunavut, Canada

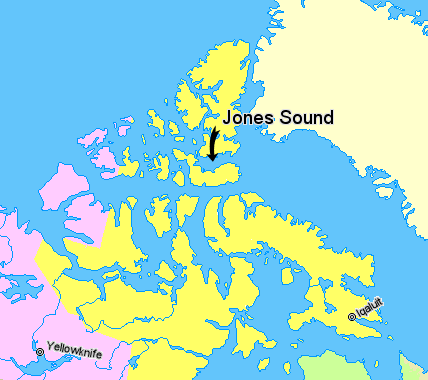
Jones Sound, Nunavut, Canada.
Nunavut
Greenland
Northwest Territories
- Location within Nunavut
- Coordinates: 76°N 086°W
- Basin countries: Canada
- Settlements: Grise Fiord

Jones Sound is a waterway in Qikiqtaaluk, Nunavut, Canada. It lies between Devon Island and the southern end of Ellesmere Island. At its northwestern end it is linked by several channels to Norwegian Bay; at its eastern end it opens via Glacier Strait into Baffin Bay. The hamlet of Grise Fiord was established on the south shore Ellesmere Island in 1953, partly to assert Canadian sovereignty in the high Arctic.

The first known European to sight the sound was the English explorer William Baffin in 1616 who named it after one of his patrons. The next European to pass it was John Ross in 1818.
