= Bylot Island =

Uninhabited island off Baffin Island in Nunavut Territory, Canada

Bylot
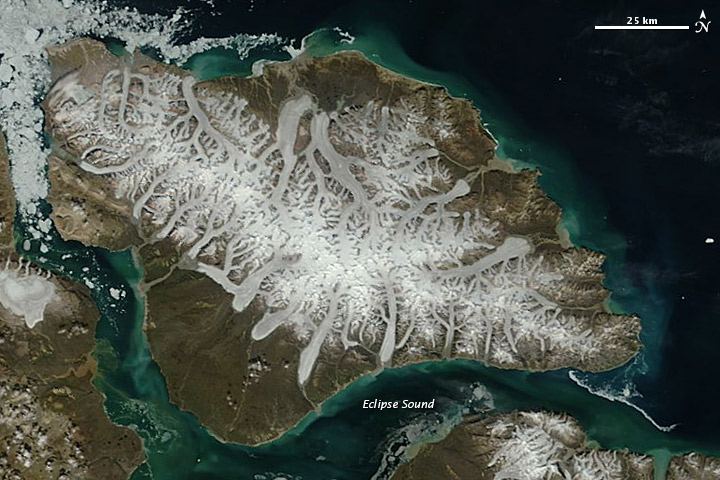
- July 2012 NASA satellite photograph of Bylot Island

- Location within Nunavut Location within Canada

Geography
- Location: Lancaster Sound
- Coordinates: 73°13′N 78°34′W
- Archipelago: Arctic Archipelago
- Area: 11,057.96 km^{2} (4,269.50 sq mi) (2026)
- Area rank: 17th in Canada & 70th worldwide
- Highest elevation: 1,951 m (6401 ft)
- Highest point: Angilaaq Mountain

Administration
- Canada
- Territory: Nunavut
- Region: Qikiqtaaluk

Demographics
- Population: Uninhabited

Bylot Island (/ˈbaɪlɒt/ BY-lot;) lies off the northern end of Baffin Island in Nunavut Territory, Canada. Eclipse Sound to the southeast and Navy Board Inlet to the southwest separate it from Baffin Island. Parry Channel lies to its northwest. At 11,057.96 km^{2} (4,269.50 sq mi) it is ranked 70th largest island in the world and Canada's 17th largest island. The island measures 180 km (110 mi) east to west and 110 km (68 mi) north to south and is one of the largest uninhabited islands in the world. While there are no permanent settlements on this Canadian Arctic island, Inuit from Pond Inlet and elsewhere regularly travel to Bylot Island. An Inuit seasonal hunting camp is located southwest of Niaqunnguut (previously Cape Graham Moore). The island's mountains are part of the Byam Martin Mountains, which is part of the Baffin Mountains of the Arctic Cordillera. In addition to Angilaaq Mountain, Malik Mountain, Mount St. Hans, and Mount Thule are notable. Tay Bay is on the west coast. Vertical cliffs along the coastline are made up of Precambrian dolomite. There are numerous glaciers. The western shore faces Navy Board Inlet. The island's north shore, facing Lancaster Sound, is a polar bear maternity den area. Beluga, bowhead whale, harp seal, narwhal, and ringed seal frequent the area. The island is named for the Arctic explorer Robert Bylot, who was the first European to sight it in 1616. The whaling captain William Adams was the first to prove the island's insular nature in 1872. In the 2000s, Baffinland Iron Mines Corporation, began to develop a tote road from its Mary River Mine, and harbour infrastructure in Milne Bay—a small, shallow arm of at the confluence of Eclipse Sound and Navy Board Inlet which separates Bylot Island from Baffin Island. Milne Inlet flows in a southerly direction from Navy Board Inlet at the confluence of Eclipse Sound.

== Protected areas ==
Almost all of the island is located within Sirmilik National Park, harbouring large populations of thick-billed murres, black-legged kittiwakes and greater snow geese. The eastern area of the island is federally designated as the Bylot Island Migratory Bird Sanctuary. Three areas are classified as Canadian Important Bird Areas: Niaqunnguut, Cape Hay, and the Southwest Bylot Plain.

== Cultural references ==
In 2010, a painting of Bylot Island titled "Bylot Island I" by Lawren Harris, one of the Group of Seven mid-century Canadian artists, was sold at auction for $2.8 million, one of the highest prices ever paid for a work by a Canadian artist.

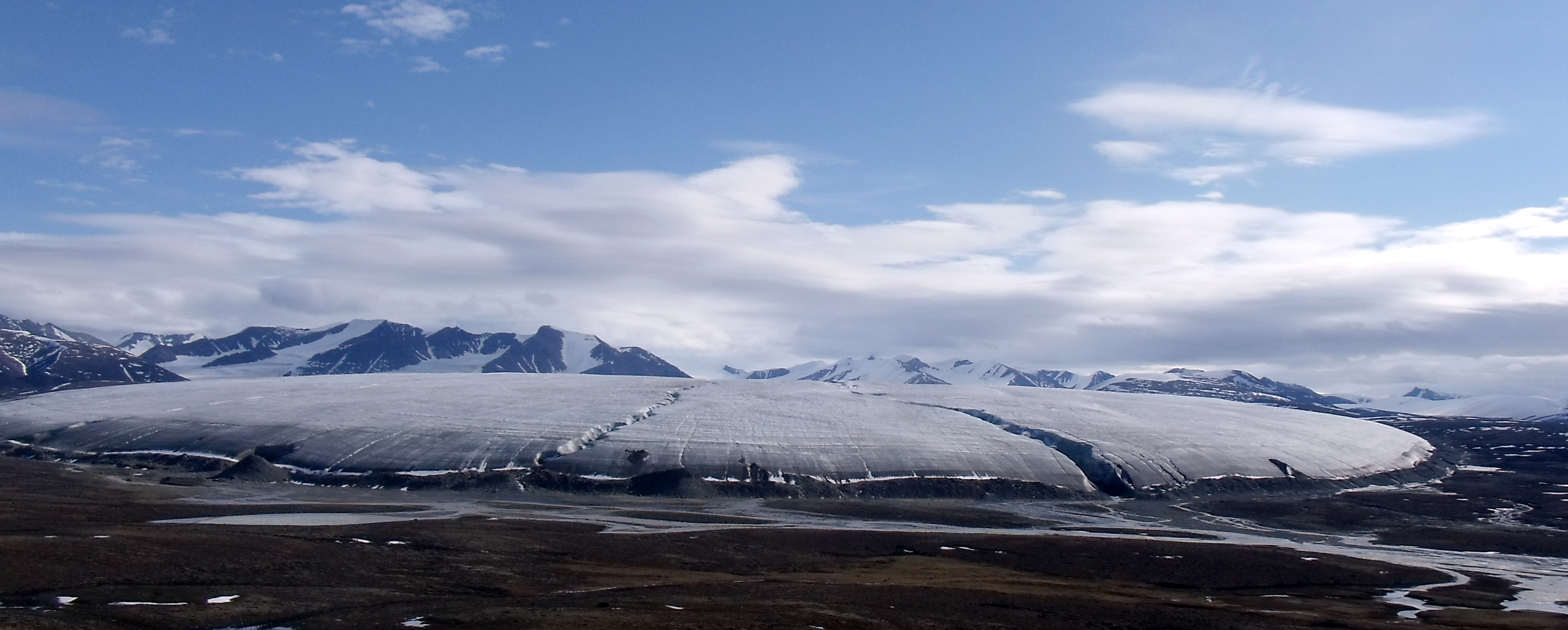
"The Mothership", a five kilometres (three miles) wide terminal lobe of a glacier flowing down from the interior ice cap on top of the Byam Martin Mountains. Note the dramatic terminal moraine "bulldozed" at the ice front.
