= International Biological Program =

The International Biological Program (IBP) was an effort between 1964 and 1974 to coordinate large-scale ecological and environmental studies. Organized in the wake of the successful International Geophysical Year (IGY) of 1957–1958, the International Biological Program was an attempt to apply the methods of big science to ecosystem ecology and pressing environmental issues.

The IBP was organized under the leadership of C. H. Waddington beginning in 1962 and officially started in 1964, with the goal of exploring "The Biological Basis of Productivity and Human Welfare". In its early years, Canadian and European ecologists were the main participants; by 1968, the United States also became heavily involved. However, unlike other more successful applications of the big science model of scientific research, the IBP lacked a clear, socially and scientifically pressing goal. Many biologists, particularly molecular biologists and evolutionary ecologists, were sharply critical of the IBP, which they viewed as throwing money at ill-defined or relatively unimportant problems and reducing the freedom of scientists to choose their own research projects.

The main results of the IBP were five biome studies, the largest of which were the Grassland Biome project and the Eastern Deciduous Forest Biome project (both of which had ties to Oak Ridge National Laboratory, which provided tracer isotopes for nutrient- and energy-flow experiments). Though the impact of these studies was modest, the IBP marked a dramatic increase in the scale of funding for ecosystem ecology, which remained high (relative to earlier levels) even after the conclusion of the program in June 1974. Far more influential than any of the IBP biome studies was contemporary Hubbard Brook ecosystem study of 1963–1968, which—lacking the hierarchical organization of IBP projects—grew gradually according to individual scientists' interest and involved more informal collaboration.

One of the most influential IBP projects in Europe was the Solling Project in Lower Saxony (Germany), led by Heinz Ellenberg. Evidence from here proved decisive in the 1980s to track down acid rain as a major cause of forest decline.

In tropical areas, the LAMTO project held by French professor Maxime Lamotte in Ivory Coast provided a thorough analysis of the savannah energy budget and a profound knowledge of almost all biodiversity present in this savannah.

== See also ==
- Human Adaptability
- Intergovernmental Science-Policy Platform on Biodiversity and Ecosystem Services
- United States Marine Mammal Program
