= Tasiujaq (Baffin Bay) =

Body of water in Nunavut, Canada

- formerly Eclipse Sound
- ᑕᓯᐅᔭᖅ (Inuktitut)
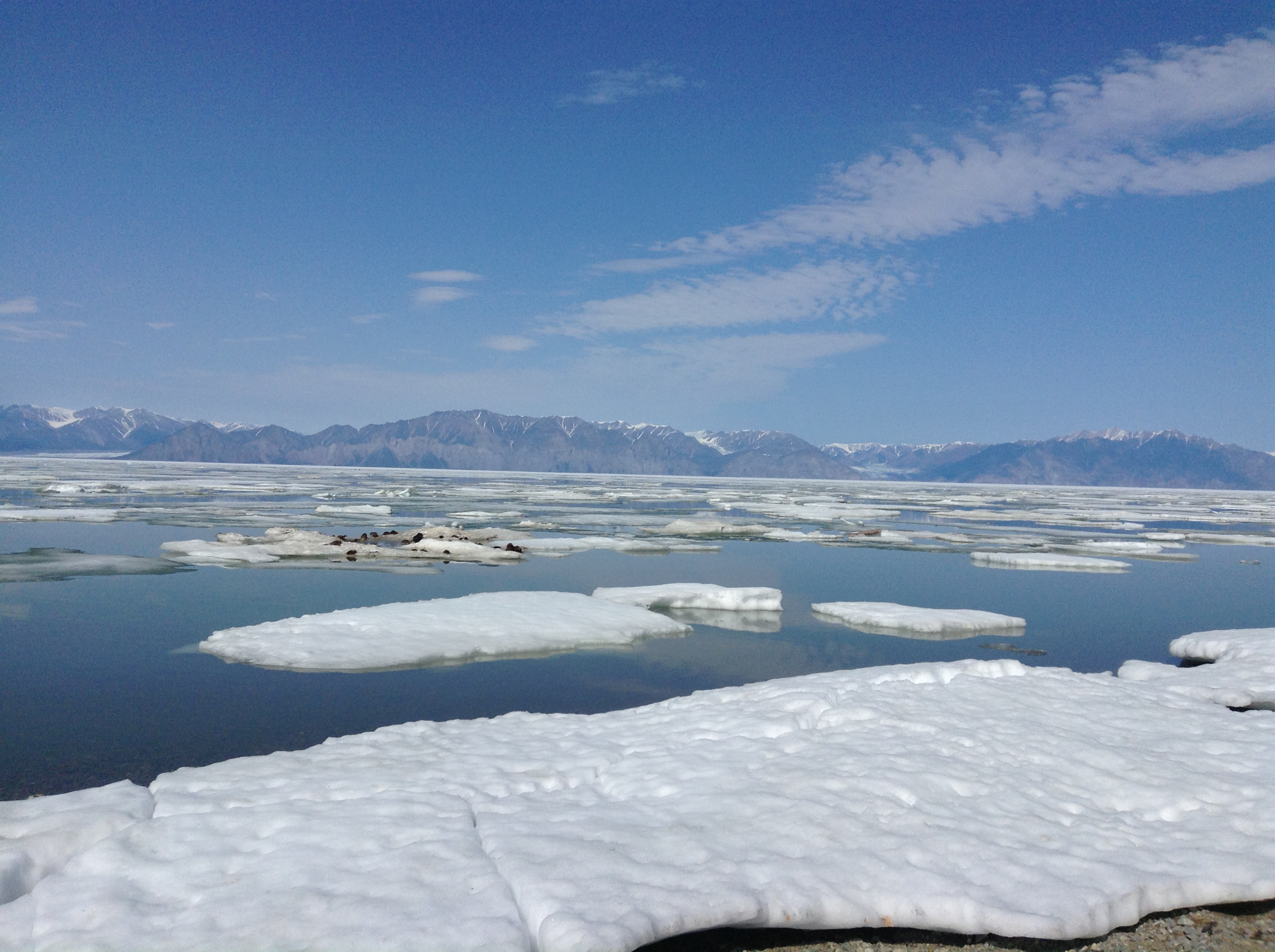
- Tasiujaq and Bylot Island seen from Pond Inlet in July 2022

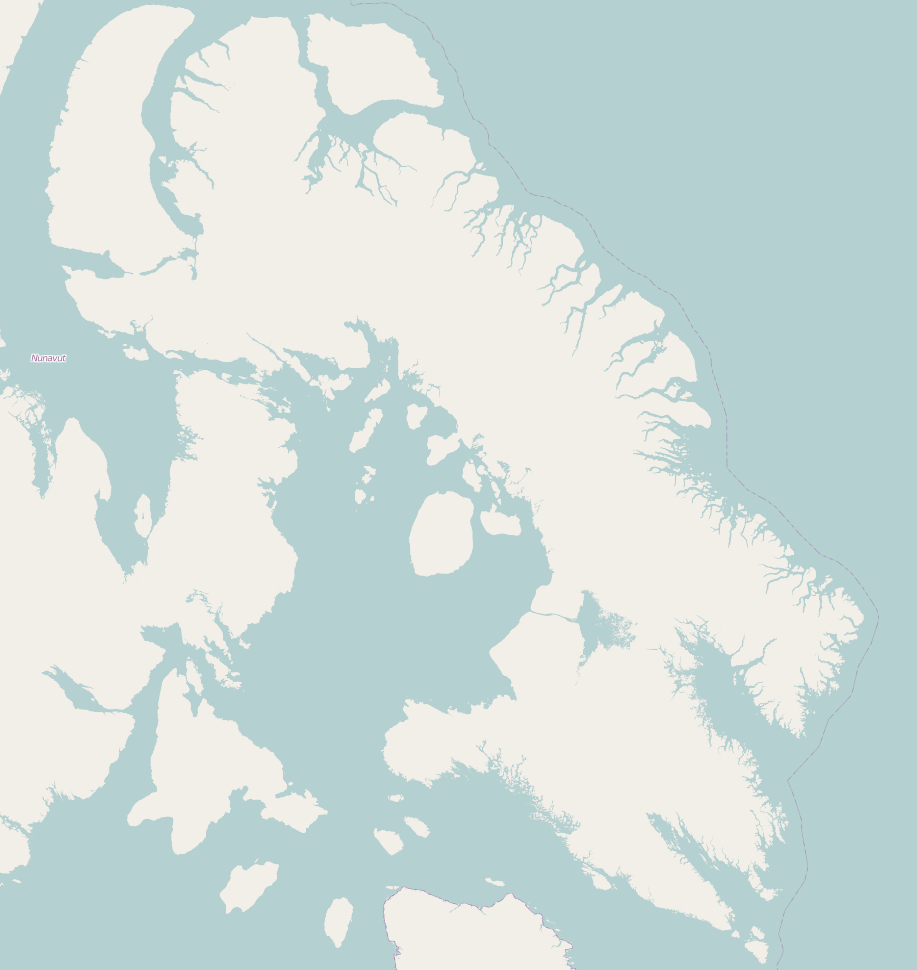
- Location Tasiujaq (Nunavut) Tasiujaq (Canada)
- Location: Qikiqtaaluk Region, Nunavut
- Coordinates: 72°37′59″N 78°36′43″W
- Ocean/sea sources: Baffin Bay (Atlantic Ocean)
- Basin countries: Canada
- Settlements: uninhabited

Tasiujaq (Inuktitut: ᑕᓯᐅᔭᖅ), formerly Eclipse Sound, is a natural waterway through the Arctic Archipelago within the Qikiqtaaluk Region, Nunavut, Canada. It separates Bylot Island (to the north) from Baffin Island (to the south). To the east, it opens into Baffin Bay via Pond Inlet, and to the north-west into the Navy Board Inlet.
