= Davis Highlands tundra =

Tundra ecoregion of Nunavut, Canada

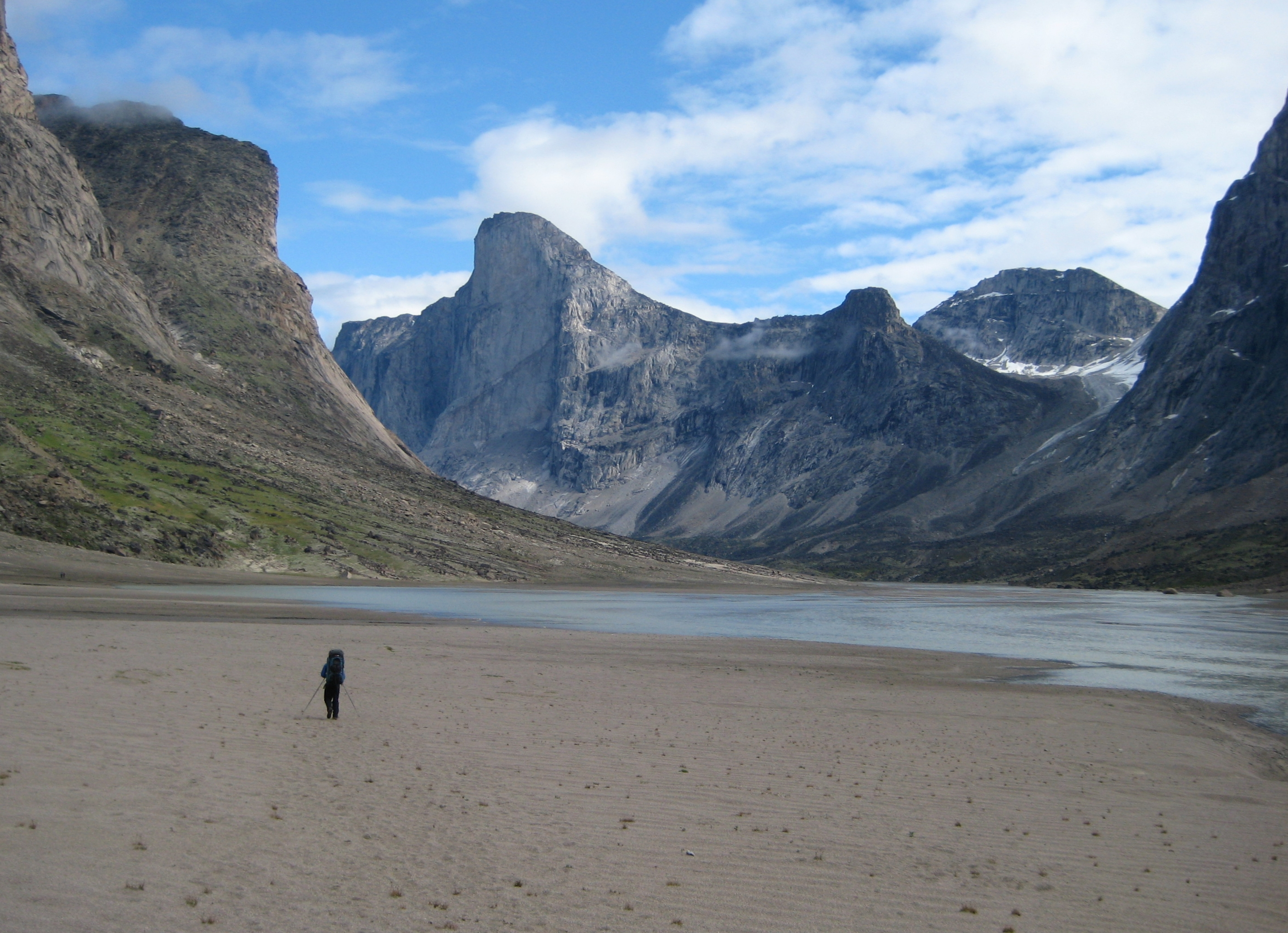
- Mount Thor in Auyuittuq National Park

- Ecoregion territory (in green)

Ecology
- Realm: Neoarctic
- Biome: Tundra
- Borders: Baffin coastal tundra; High Arctic tundra; Middle Arctic tundra

Geography
- Area: 88,084 km^{2} (34,009 mi^{2})
- Country: Canada
- Territory: Nunavut
- Coordinates: 70.25°N 70.75°W

Conservation
- Conservation status: Relatively Stable/Intact

The Davis Highlands tundra ecoregion (WWF ID: NA1109) covers the Baffin Mountains on the northeast coast of Baffin Island and Bylot Island, facing Baffin Bay in Nunavut, northern Canada. The terrain is extremely rugged, heavily glaciated, with many deep fjords, and very cold. About half of the territory is moss and lichen tundra, the other half bare rock and ice. The region is wetter than the much drier regions to the southwest of the Baffin Islands.

== Location and description ==
The Baffin Islands are the southeastern half of the Arctic Cordillera, a chain of island mountains that run along the northeast of the Canada's Arctic Archipelago. They are separated from Greenland by Baffin Bay. The Baffin Island section is 900 km long; the Bylot Island mountains to the north of Baffin Island add another 100 km. The ecoregion averages only 100 km wide. The mean elevation is around 727 metres (2,385 ft) and the maximum is 2,147 metres (7,044 ft) at Mount Odin.

Much of the ground bare is bedrock and glaciers; open soil is continuous permafrost. Along the seacoast, deep fjords reach into the glaciated mountains. The ecoregion to the south along the length is the High Arctic tundra, which is much drier (averaging only 100 mm/year of precipitation compared to the 400–600 mm/year in the Davis Highlands).

== Climate ==
The climate of the ecoregion is Ice cap climate (Köppen climate classification EF), a local climate in which no month has an average temperature above (0 °C (32 °F)). These regions are generally above 65% in latitude (north or south), are characterized by expanses of ice and bare ground, and little animal life. The mean annual temperature is −11.5 °C (11.3 °F). Mean annual precipitation is 400–600 mm/year.

== Flora and fauna ==
Half of the ecoregion is bare ice or permanent water, and not supportive of life. The other half is sparsely covered with moss and lichen. A few cold-tolerant vascular plants are found, such as sedge (Carex) and cotton grass (Eriophorum).

Bird life is an important ecological feature of the ecoregion. One of the world's largest nesting colonies of snow geese (chen caerulescens) is found on Bylot Island. Large colonies of thick-billed murres (Uria lomvia) and the vulnerable black-legged kittiwakes (Rissa tridactyla) inhabit the area. Other bird of the ecoregion include king eider (Somateria spectabilis), rock ptarmigan (Lagopus mutus), northern fulmar (Fulmarus glacialis), plover (Charadrius and Pluvialis), hoary redpoll (Carduelis hornemanni) and snow bunting (Plectrophenax nivalis).

Land mammals in the ecoregion include arctic hare (Lepus arcticus), arctic fox (Alopex lagopus), caribou (Rangifer tarandus), and Polar bears (Ursus maritimus).

== Protected areas ==
Over 31% of the ecoregion is officially protected. These protected areas include:

- Auyuittuq National Park
- Bylot Island Migratory Bird Sanctuary
- Ninginganiq National Wildlife Area
- Qaqulluit National Wildlife Area
- Sirmilik National Park

== See also ==
- List of ecoregions in Canada (WWF)
