= High Arctic tundra =

Tundra ecoregion of Nunavut and the Northwest Territories, Canada

Canadian High Arctic tundra
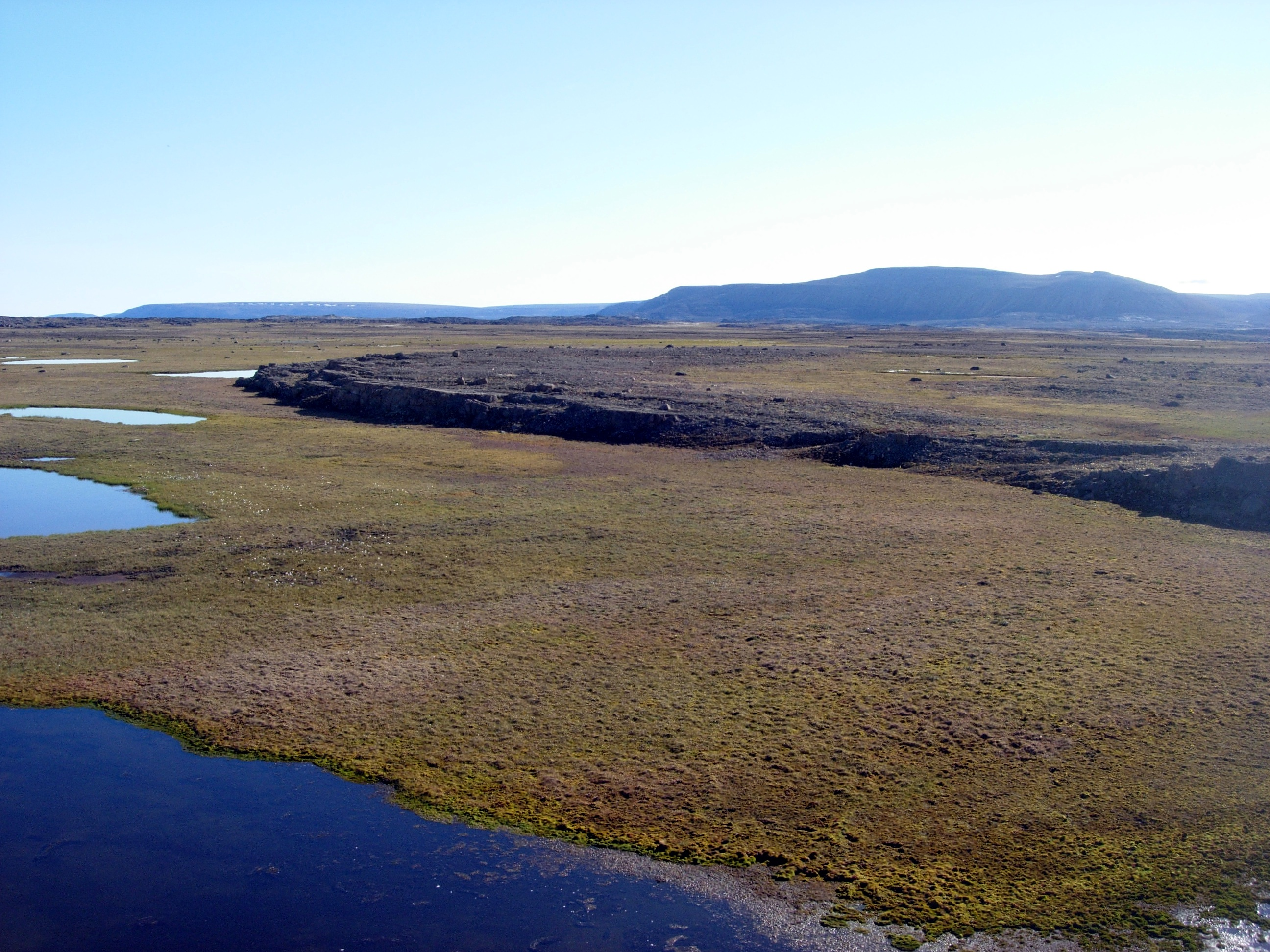
- Truelove Lowlands, Devon Island

- Ecoregion territory (in green)

Ecology
- Realm: Neoarctic
- Biome: Tundra
- Borders: Davis Highlands tundra; Kalaallit Nunaat high arctic tundra; Middle Arctic tundra
- Bird species: 44
- Mammal species: 10

Geography
- Area: 464,788 km^{2} (179,456 mi^{2})
- Country: Canada
- Territories: Northwest Territories and Nunavut
- Coordinates: 75.25°N 89.75°W
- Climate type: Polar

Conservation
- Conservation status: Relatively Stable/Intact
- Habitat loss: 0%
- Protected: 9.9%

The Canadian High Arctic Tundra ecoregion encompasses most of the northern Arctic archipelago, from much of Baffin Island, Somerset Island, and Prince of Wales Island in the south, through all islands northward to the most northern island in Canada, Ellesmere Island. Much of the northern islands are covered in ice, and the climate is very dry with as little as 50 mm/year in places. The ecoregion has very little human habitation, and most of the non-ice terrain is moss and lichen cover. The region supports viable populations of Arctic mammals such as muskox, Arctic wolves, Arctic foxes, Arctic hares, polar bears, and caribou.

== Location and description ==
The main Queen Elizabeth Islands are Ellesmere Island, Axel Heiberg Island, Devon Island, Ellef Ringnes Island, Somerset Island, Prince Patrick Island, and Melville Island. The maximum elevation is 1,633 metres (5,358 ft). The ecoregion to the north on Baffin Island is the Davis Highlands tundra, which receives more than twice as much precipitation (400-600 mm/year).

The terrain varies across the ecoregion. The north and west is mountainous and heavily covered in ice. To the south and east the covered portions of Somerset and Baffin Islands are lowland plains with glacial moraines. The ocean around the northern islands tends to be iced over even through the summer, while there is open water in the summer around the southern islands. On land, permafrost is continuous and deep.

== Climate ==
The climate of the ecoregion is Tundra climate (Köppen climate classification ET), a local climate in which at least one month has an average temperature high enough to melt snow (0 °C (32 °F)), but no month with an average temperature in excess of 10 °C (50 °F).

== Flora and fauna ==
While much of the ecoregion is ice or bare rock with very sparse vegetation, up to 68 percent of the cover is moss and lichen. A further 6% of the land, supports herbaceous cover. In the north, only the hardiest cold-tolerant vascular plants can survive, such as sedge (Carex) and cotton grass (Eriophorum). In a few low-lying, protected areas there can be small stands of Arctic willow (Salix arctica), Dryas species, and low-growing purple saxifrage (Saxifraga oppositifolia), Kobresia species and Arctic poppy (Papaver radicatum). In the south with a marginally relatively milder and wetter climate, the landscape may also feature stands of wood rush (Luzula) and wire rush (Juncus).

Mammals in the ecoregion include muskox (Ovibos moschatus), Arctic hare (Lepus arcticus), Arctic fox (Alopex lagopus), caribou (Rangifer tarandus), polar bears (Ursus maritimus), and Arctic wolves (Canis lupus arctos).

== Protected areas ==
Over 10% of the ecoregion is officially protected. These protected areas include:

- Polar Bear Pass National Wildlife Area
- Quttinirpaaq National Park
- Prince Leopold Island Migratory Bird Sanctuary
- Sirmilik National Park
- Qausuittuq National Park
- Auyuittuq National Park

== See also ==
- List of ecoregions in Canada (WWF)
