= Midnight Sun Peak =

Mountain in Nunavut, Canada

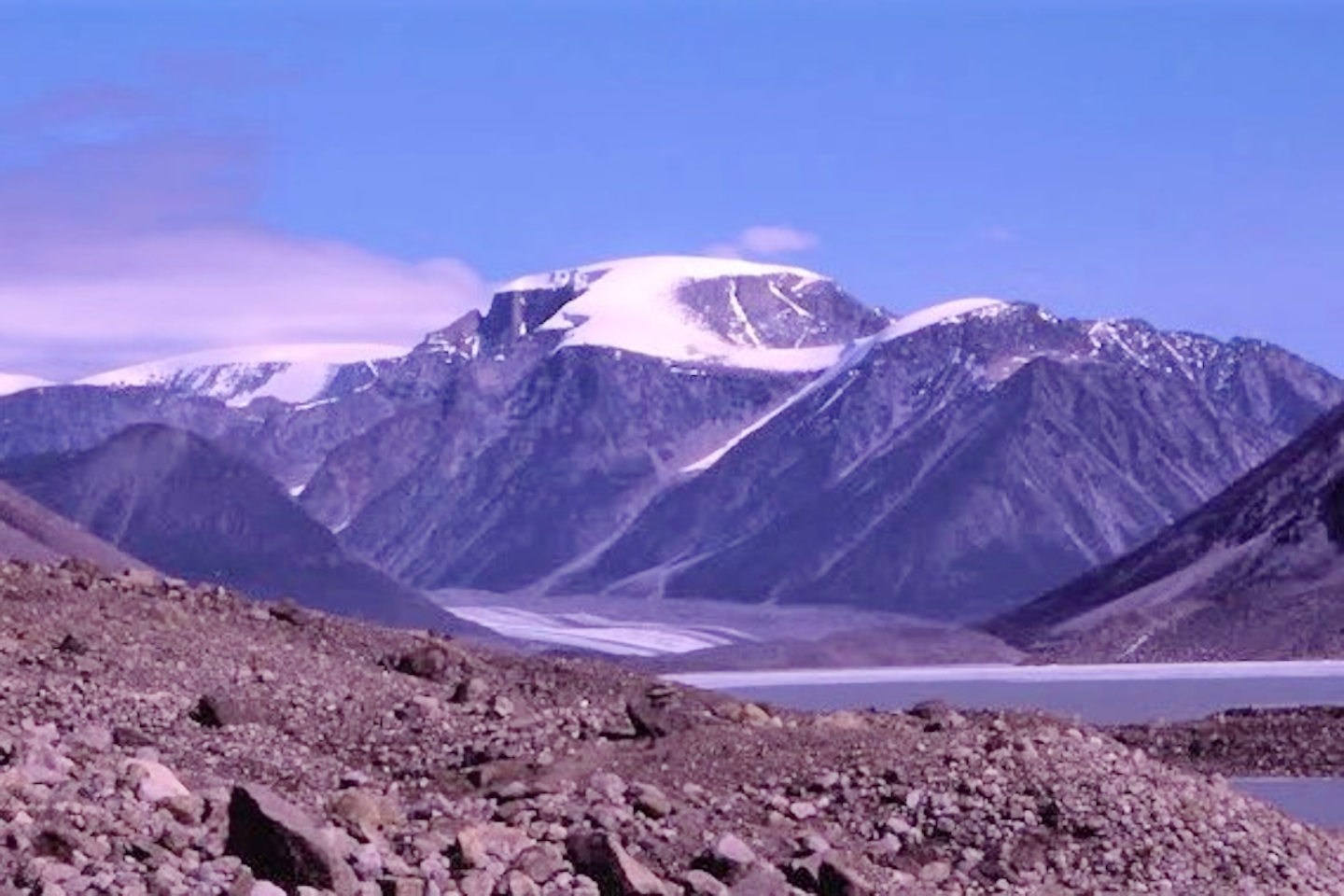
- Midnight Sun Peak from just above Akshayuk Pass

Highest point
- Elevation: 1,967 m (6,453 ft)
- Listing: Mountains of Canada
- Coordinates: 66°45′00″N 64°58′10″W

Geography
- Location within Nunavut
- Location: Baffin Island, Nunavut, Canada
- Protected area: Auyuittuq National Park
- Parent range: Baffin Mountains
- Topo map: NTS 26I15 (untitled)

Midnight Sun Peak is a mountain in the Baffin Mountains, Baffin Island, Nunavut, Canada. It is part of the Auyuittuq National Park area with an elevation of 1,967 m (6,453 ft).

== Geography ==
Midnight Sun Peak is a flat-topped mountain. It is located in the eastern Baffin Mountains which in turn form part of the Arctic Cordillera mountain system.

== Gallery ==
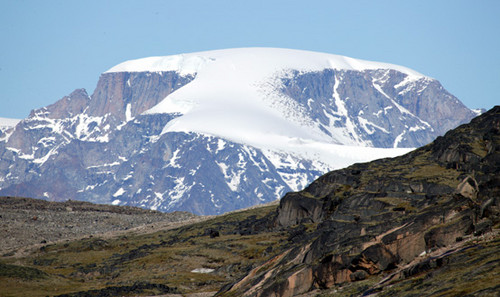
Midnight Sun Peak, upper reaches
