= Blacha =

Blacha is a surname. Notable people with the surname include:

- Anja Blacha (born 1990), German mountaineer
- David Blacha (born 1990), Polish footballer
- Tommy Blacha (born 1962), American comedy writer

== See also ==
- Blacha, Ávila, a populated place in Spain
