= Baffin coastal tundra =

Tundra ecoregion of Nunavut, Canada

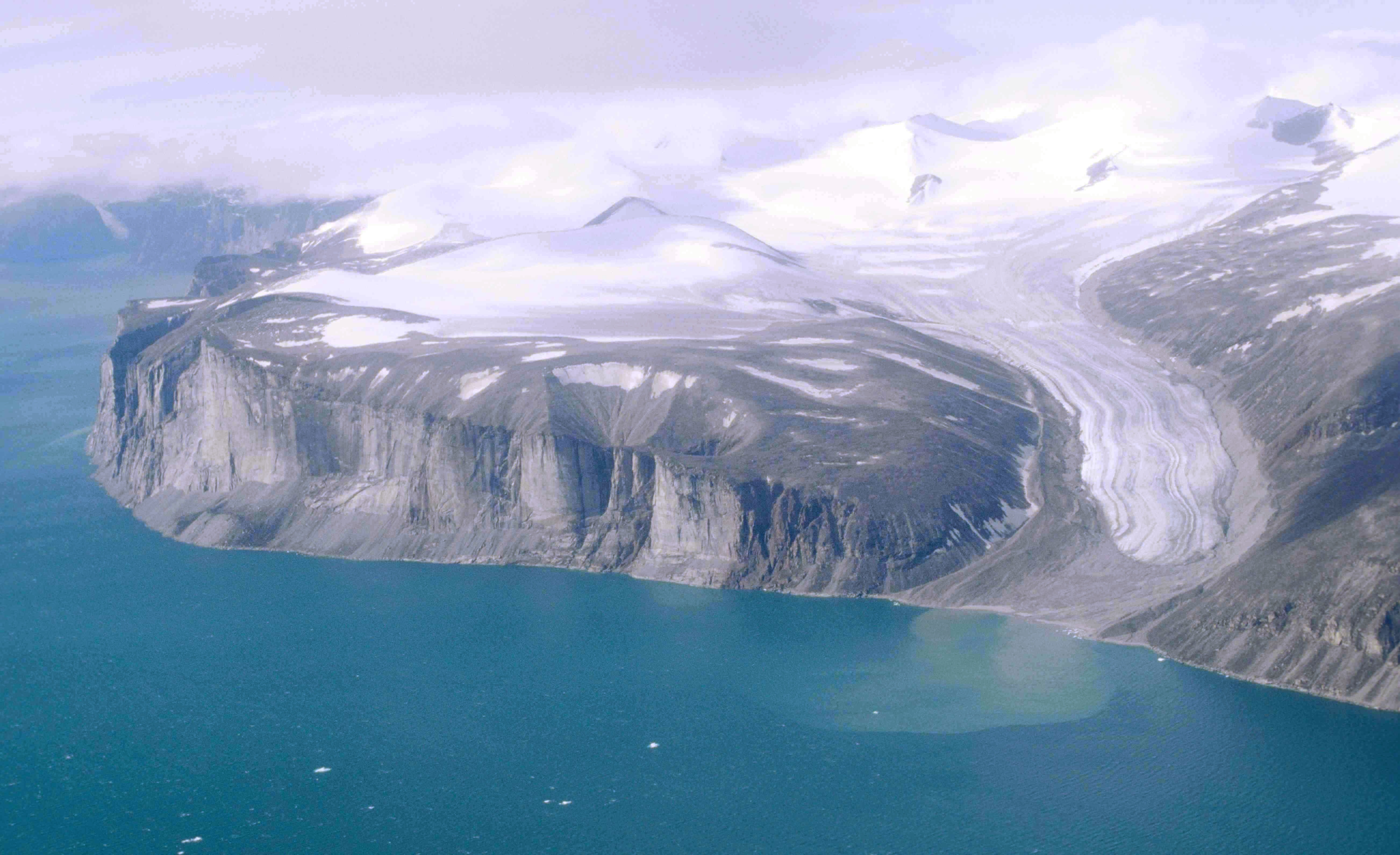
- Sam Ford Fjord shoreline on the eastern side of the Remote Peninsula

- 1105. Baffin Coastal Tundra

Ecology
- Realm: Nearctic
- Biome: Tundra
- Borders: Davis Highlands tundra
- Bird species: Snow bunting
- Mammal species: Polar bear, Arctic hare, Arctic fox, lemming, caribou

Geography
- Area: 9,100 km^{2} (3,500 sq mi)
- Country: Canada
- Province: Nunavut
- Geology: rocky coast, fjords
- Climate type: Tundra (ET)

Conservation
- Conservation status: Relatively stable/intact
- Habitat loss: 0%
- Protected: 0%

The Baffin coastal tundra is a small ecoregion of the far north of North America, on the central north coast of Baffin Island in the Canadian territory of Nunavut. This is permafrost tundra with an average annual temperature below freezing.

== Setting ==
This ecoregion is a small stretch of coastal plain on the north coast of Baffin Island. The coast is rocky with many fjords carved by glaciers into the Baffin Mountains. The cold Arctic climate consists of a short summers (mean temperature 1 °C) and a long, cold winter (mean temperature −22.5 °C).

== Flora ==
The plant cover is sparse in the drier areas while the wetter areas have a fair cover of mosses, sedges, shrubs such as purple saxifrage, Arctic willow, and Arctic poppy and rushes.

== Fauna ==
This coast is a breeding area for the snow bunting and is home to polar bear, Arctic hare, Arctic fox, lemming, and caribou.

== Threats and preservation ==
This ecoregion is almost intact although there are no protected areas.

== See also ==
- List of ecoregions in Canada (WWF)
