= Cockscomb Pass =

Mountain pass in Nunavut, Canada

- Location within Nunavut
- Elevation: 1,345 metres (4,413 ft)

Third Approach
- Location: Nunavut, Canada
- Coordinates: 70°33′03″N 070°31′50″W
- Topo map: NTS 27F11 (untitled)

Cockscomb Pass is a mountain pass in the central Baffin Mountains, Nunavut, Canada.
