= Akshayuk Pass =

Mountain pass in Nunavut, Canada

- Pangnirtung Pass
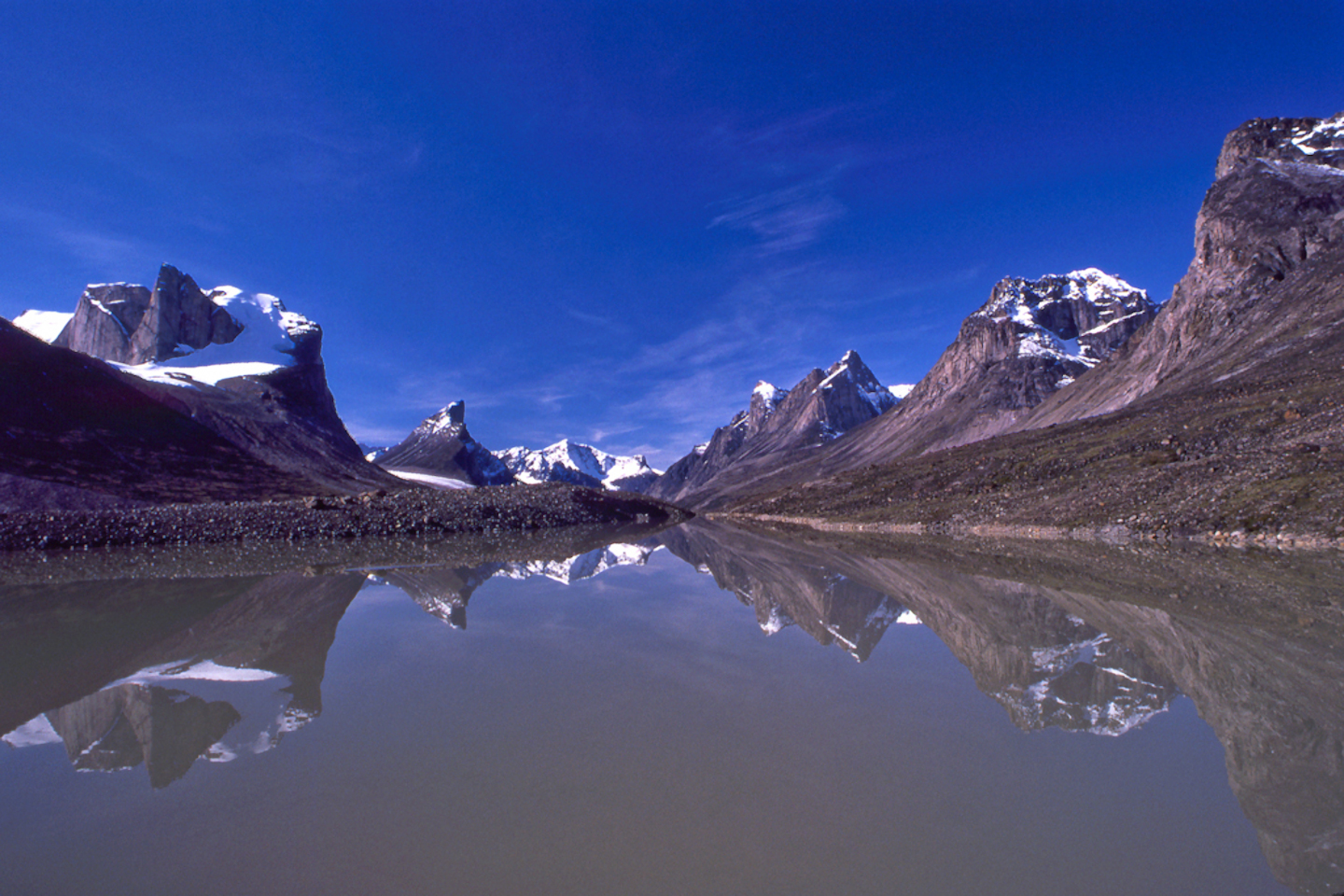
- Summit Lake, Akshayuk Pass, Baffin Island

- Location within Nunavut
- Elevation: 420 m (1,380 ft)

Location
- Location: Baffin Island
- Range: Baffin Mountains
- Coordinates: 66°40′N 65°08′W
- Topo map: NTS 26I11 Mount Asgard

Akshayuk Pass formerly Pangnirtung Pass is a mountain pass in the Baffin Mountains of Nunavut, Canada. It is found within Auyuittuq National Park. To the southwest is Mount Thor, about 17 km (11 mi), and Pangnirtung, about 64 km (40 mi) and to the northeast is Qikiqtarjuaq, about 109 km (68 mi).

== Geography ==
Akshayuk Pass is a U-shaped glacially carved valley on the Cumberland Peninsula of Baffin Island. It is a 97 km (60 mi) long mountain pass which cuts through the southern Baffin Mountains. Two rivers flow from Akshayuk Pass, the Owl river in the north and the Weasel river in the south. The highest point is Summit Lake, which is 420 m (1,380 ft) above sea level.

Akshayuk Pass was carved by glaciers during the last glacial period. Many smaller glaciers still remain in adjacent hanging valleys. Many of these glaciers source from the Penny Ice Cap to the north of Akshayuk Pass.

== Gallery ==
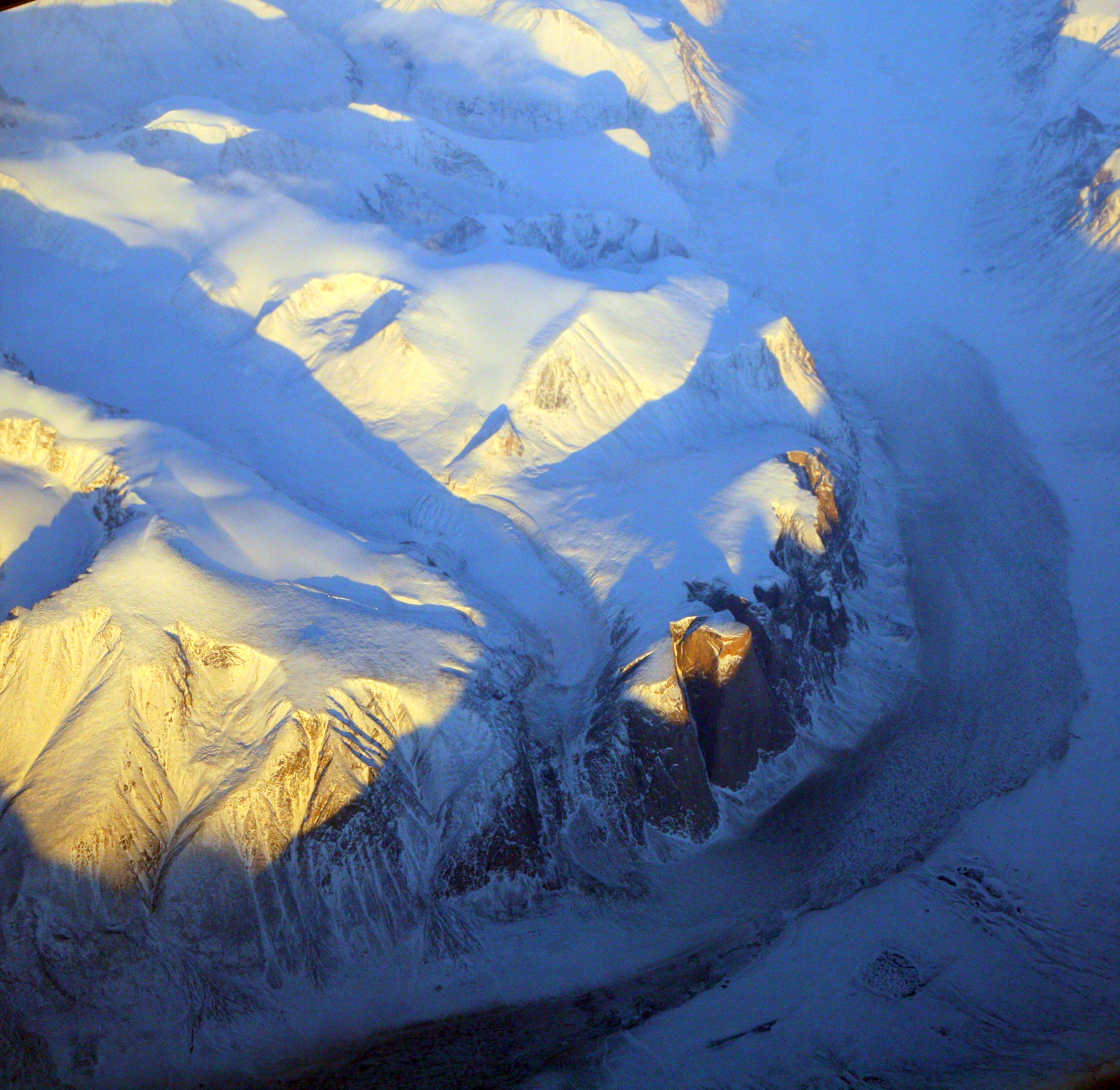
Akshayuk Pass from the air, November 2014

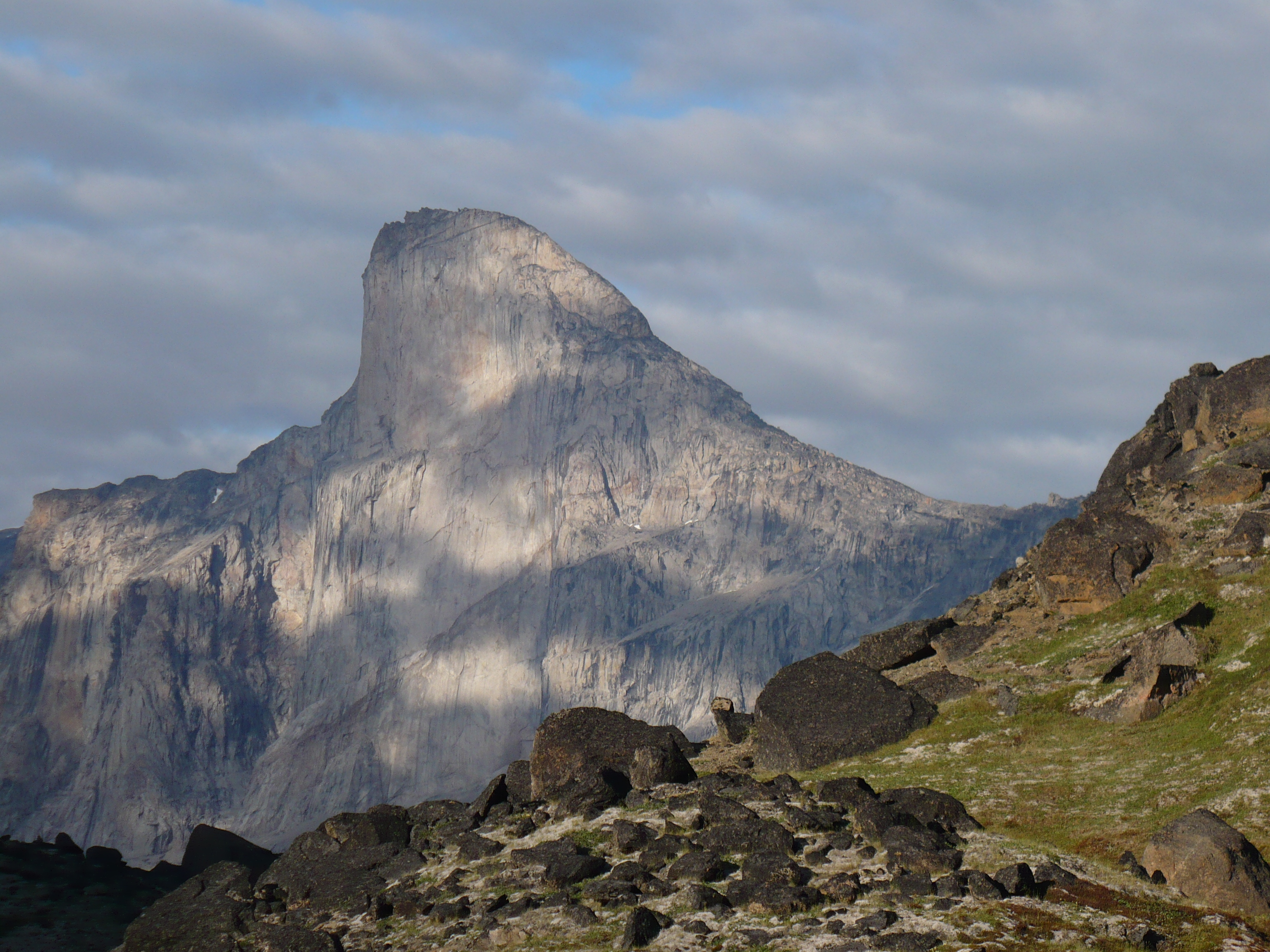
Mount Thor seen from Akshayuk Pass

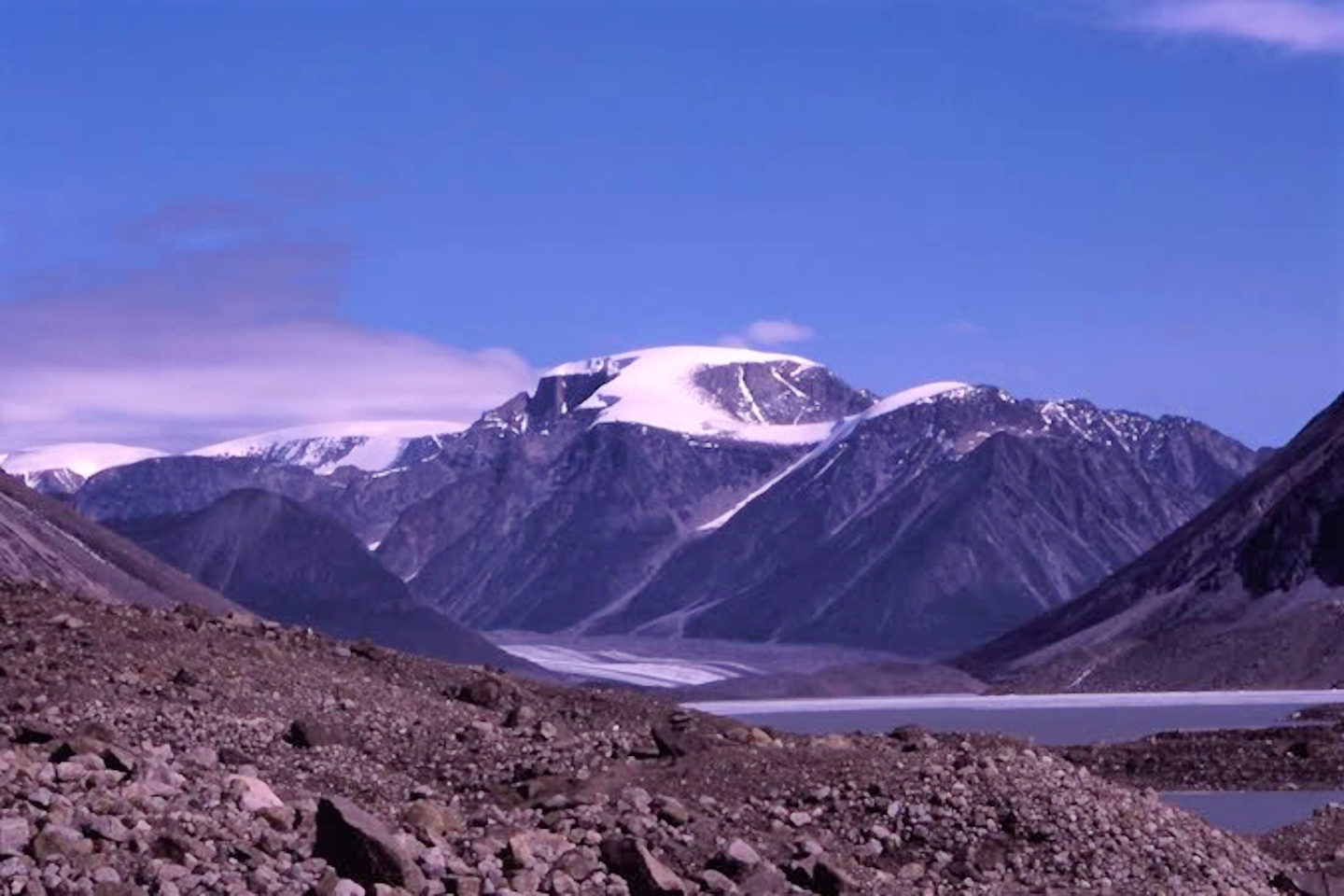
Akshayuk Pass and Midnight Sun Peak
