= Pioneer Pass =

Mountain pass in Nunavut, Canada

- Location within Nunavut

Third Approach
- Location: Nunavut, Canada
- Coordinates: 70°27′03″N 70°49′50″W
- Topo map: NTS 27F6 (untitled)

Pioneer Pass is a mountain pass in the central Baffin Mountains, Nunavut, Canada.
