= Kisimngiuqtuq Peak =

Mountain in Nunavut, Canada

- Location within Nunavut

Highest point
- Elevation: 1,905 m (6,250 ft)
- Prominence: 1,605 m (5,266 ft)
- Listing: North America isolated peaks 96th; Canada prominent peaks 106th; Canada most isolated peaks 29th
- Coordinates: 70°47′57.1″N 71°39′06.1″W

Geography
- Location: Baffin Island, Nunavut, Canada
- Parent range: Baffin Mountains
- Topo map: NTS 27F13 Natsiaq Peak

Kisimngiuqtuq Peak is a mountain in Qikiqtaaluk, Nunavut, Canada. It is associated with the Baffin Mountains on Baffin Island. It is the tenth highest peak in Nunavut and the eleventh highest peak in Nunavut by topographic prominence.
