= Bastille Peak =

Mountain north of Pangnirtung, Baffin Island, Nunavut, Canada

Highest point
- Elevation: 1,733 m (5,686 ft)
- Coordinates: 66°46′01″N 065°04′59″W

Geography
- Location: Baffin Island, Nunavut, Canada
- Parent range: Baffin Mountains
- Topo map: NTS 26I14 Tête Blanche

Bastille Peak is a mountain located 74 km (46 mi) north of Pangnirtung, Baffin Island, Nunavut, Canada. It is associated with the Baffin Mountains which in turn form part of the Arctic Cordillera mountain system.
