= La Torre =

Municipality in Castile and León, Spain

- municipality
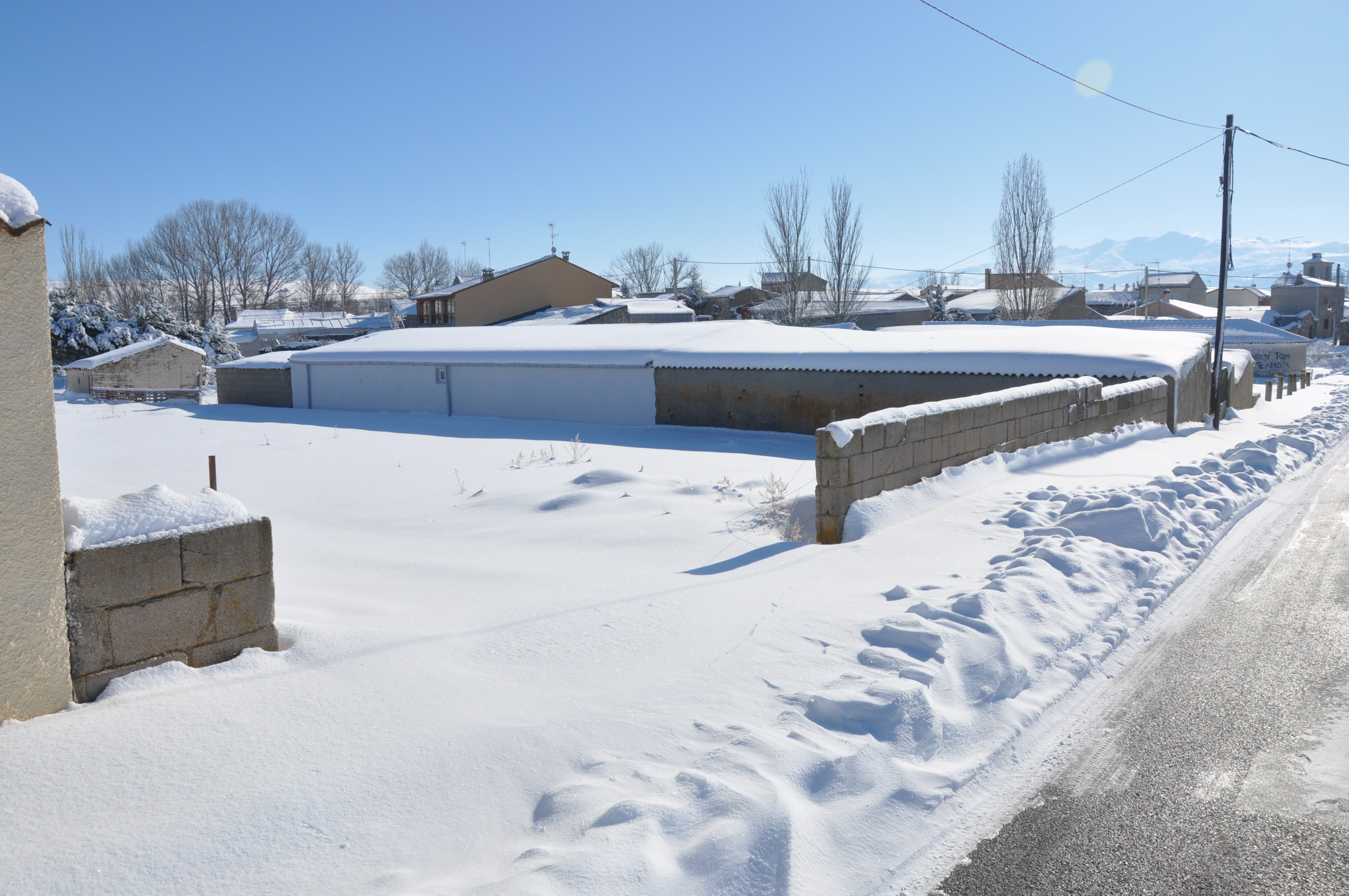
- Winter panorama from the north
- Nickname: La Torre del Valle de Amblés
- Extension of the municipal term within the province of Ávila

- Location in Spain. La Torre (Castile and León)
- Coordinates: 40°35′21″N 4°57′55″W
- Country: Spain
- Autonomous community: Castile and León
- Province: Ávila

Government
  - Mayor: Bernardino Angel Jiménez Galán, PP

Area
  - Total: 58 km^{2} (22 sq mi)
- Elevation: 1,130 m (3,710 ft)

Population (2025-01-01)
  - Total: 209
  - Density: 3.6/km^{2} (9.3/sq mi)
- Time zone: UTC+1 (CET)
  - Summer (DST): UTC+2 (CEST)
- Website: Official website

La Torre is a municipality composed of the following districts, Balbarda, Blacha, Guareña, Oco and Sanchicorto located in the province of Ávila, Castile and León, Spain.

== Population ==
Historical population
Year	Pop.	±% p.a.
2023	223	—
2024	212	−4.93%
2025	209	−1.42%
Source: INE
