= Mount Thule =

Mountain in Nunavut, Canada

Highest point
- Elevation: 1,711 m (5,614 ft)
- Coordinates: 73°01′01″N 078°25′01″W

Geography
- Location: Bylot Island, Nunavut, Canada
- Parent range: Baffin Mountains
- Topo map: NTS 38C3 Mount Mitima

Mount Thule is a mountain on Bylot Island, Nunavut, Canada. It is located 38 km (24 mi) north of Pond Inlet on Baffin Island. It is associated with the Baffin Mountains which in turn form part of the Arctic Cordillera mountain system. The area around Mount Thule is permanently covered in ice and snow.
