= Anja Blacha =

German mountaineer

Anja Karen Blacha (born 18 June 1990) is a German mountaineer. Blacha holds a number of climbing records: in 2017, she became the youngest German woman to climb Mount Everest and youngest German overall to climb all Seven Summits and in 2019 she became the first German woman to climb K2.

In 2020, she set a world record as the first woman to ski solo and unsupported from the Antarctic coast to the South Pole. This journey also makes her the youngest person ever to reach the South Pole solo and unsupported from a coastal starting point.

She has a track record of 100% first time success, and, being a full-time business professional, has been almost entirely self-funded on her expeditions.

== Personal life ==
Blacha grew up in Bielefeld, Germany and lived and worked in London, UK before moving to Zurich, Switzerland in 2016. She has been working in the telecommunications industry and in project management. She holds a Bachelor's degree in Business Administration from University of Mannheim with studies at UC Berkeley and Korea University, as well as a Master's degree in Philosophy from Birkbeck, University of London.

She has been a long-time athlete in fencing. In 2012, she was awarded Sportswoman of the year by the University of London.

In 2017, Zeit Campus named her one of "18 for 18", a feature of 18 people under age 30 who are having an impact in Germany.

== Expeditions ==
=== Mountaineering expeditions ===
==== Seven Summits ====
Anja Blacha first started mountaineering in 2015 when she climbed Aconcagua. She then continued to climb all Seven Summits, scaling the highest mountain on each continent with 100% first-time success in just under three years. At age 26, she became the youngest German woman to summit Mount Everest which she climbed via the North route from Tibet. Later that year, at age 27, she became the youngest German to complete all Seven Summits.

No	Year	Peak	Elevation	Continent
1	2015	Aconcagua	6,962 m	South America
2	2015	Kilimanjaro	5,895 m	Africa
3	2016	Denali	6,194 m	North America
4	2016	Mount Elbrus	5,642 m	Europe
5	2016	Carstensz Pyramid	4,884 m	Australia
6	2017	Mount Everest	8,848 m	Asia
7	2017	Mount Vinson	4,892 m	Antarctica

==== K2 expedition ====
In summer 2019, Anja embarked on a double expedition in Pakistan to climb Broad Peak and K2 in the same season. As part of the acclimatisation for K2, she first summited Broad Peak, the world's 12th highest mountain at 8,047 m, on July 4. Thereafter, she summited K2, the world's 2nd highest mountain at 8,611 m, on July 25, ascending via the Abruzzi Spur, descending via the Cesen route. She reached both summits without the use of supplemental oxygen.

She is the first German woman to have summited K2 and the 8th German overall.

==== Other 8,000er peaks ====
In 2021, Blacha climbed Mount Everest a second time, now from the South Side using bottled oxygen above 8,400 m.

In 2023, she climbed Nanga Parbat, Gasherbrum I and Gasherbrum II, thus scaling all of the five Pakistani 8,000 m peaks without bottled oxygen.

In 2024, Anja summited Makalu, Kangchenjunga, Manaslu and Cho Oyu without supplementary oxygen. The following year, she climbed Annapurna I, Dhaulagiri and Everest, again without bottled oxygen.

No	Year	Peak	Elevation	Oxygen
1	2017, 2021, 2025	Mount Everest	8,848 m	No O_{2} 2025
2	2019	Broad Peak	8,051 m	No O_{2}
3	2019	K2	8,611 m	No O_{2}
4	2023	Nanga Parbat	8,125 m	No O_{2}
5	2023	Gasherbrum II	8,034 m	No O_{2}
6	2023	Gasherbrum I	8,080 m	No O_{2}
7	2024	Kangchenjunga	8,586 m	No O_{2}
8	2024	Makalu	8,485 m	No O_{2}
9	2024	Manaslu	8,163 m	No O_{2}
10	2024	Cho Oyu	8,188 m	No O_{2}
11	2025	Annapurna I	8,091 m	No O_{2}
12	2025	Dhaulagiri	8,167 m	No O_{2}

=== Polar expeditions ===
==== Southern Solitaire ====
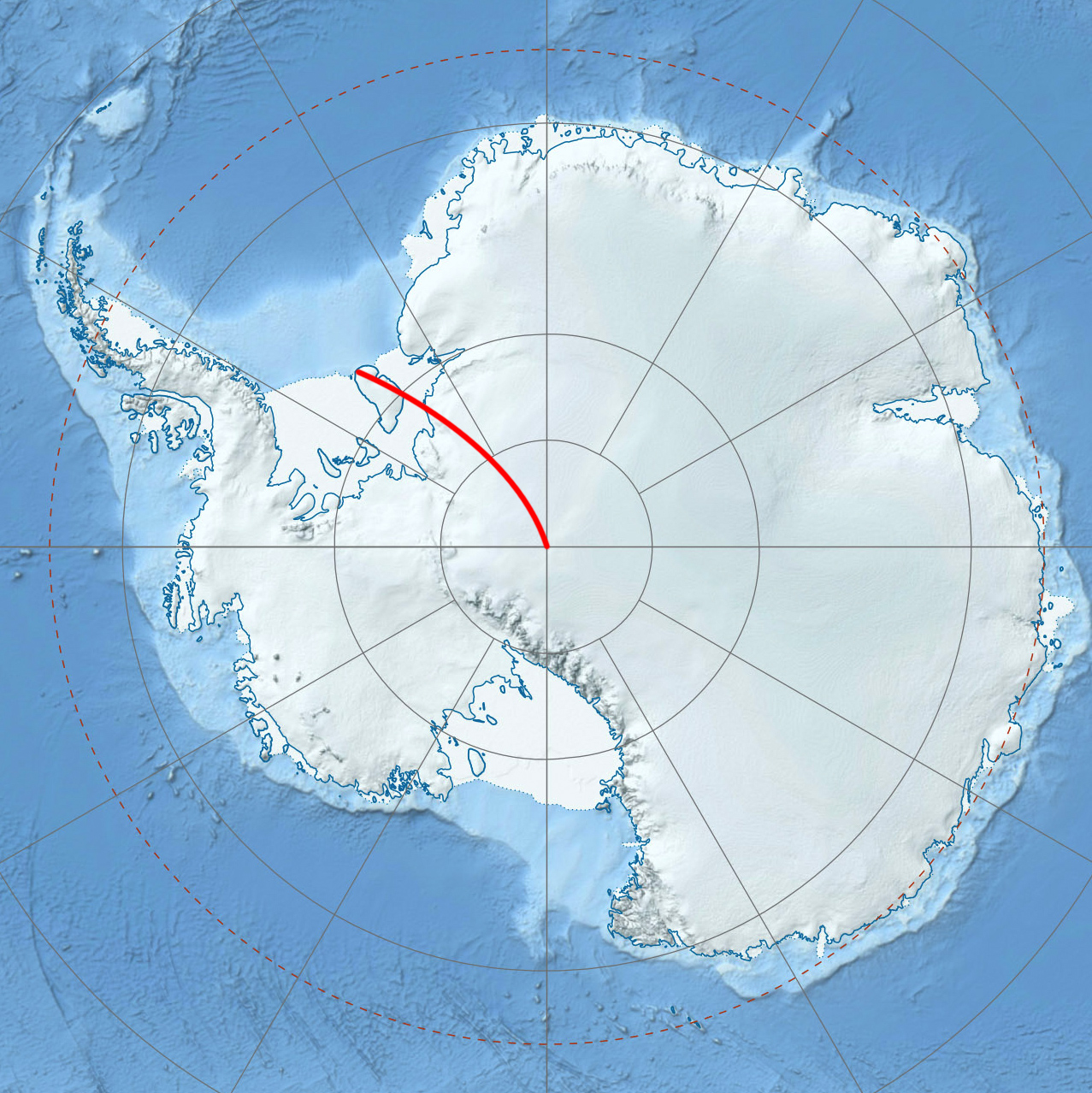
Southern Solitaire route

On 9 January 2020, Anja reached the South Pole after having skied for 57 days, 18 hours, and 50 minutes from the Northern end of Berkner Island to the South Pole. She has started further North on Berkner Island than any other expedition before her, and set the record for the longest solo unsupported polar expedition by any woman at that time. Besides being the first woman to achieve this, she is also still the youngest person to ski solo unsupported to the South Pole from a coastal starting point.

Only five people in history have accomplished a journey from Berkner Island to the South Pole solo, unsupported, and unassisted before her. Amongst these are polar explorers Børge Ousland, Ben Saunders, and Henry Worsley who died shortly after being evacuated on a later part of his expedition.

INTERSPORT has supported this expedition, and together they launched the campaign “Not bad for a girl” to inspire and encourage people to look beyond stereotypes.

==== Other polar expeditions ====
- 2019, Greenland, ski crossing West to East, team, unsupported
- 2023, Akshayuk Pass ski crossing, solo, unsupported
- 2023, Northwest Passage ski crossing Cambridge Bay to Gjoa Haven, team, unsupported
