= Qiajivik Mountain =

Mountain in Nunavut, Canada

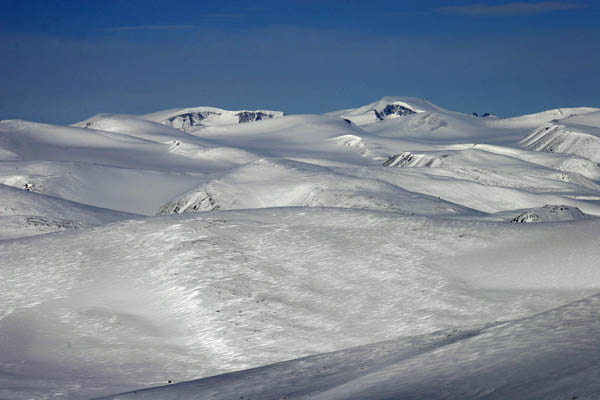
- Qiajivik Mountain is the high dome right of center. This view is from a high hill about 32 km to the east near Nova Zembla Island.

Highest point
- Elevation: 1,963 m (6,440 ft)
- Prominence: 1,787 m (5,863 ft)
- Listing: North America isolated peaks 14th; Canada prominent peaks 61st; Canada most isolated peaks 3rd
- Coordinates: 72°10′57″N 75°54′24″W

Geography
- Location within Nunavut
- Location: North Baffin Island, Nunavut, Canada
- Parent range: Baffin Mountains
- Topo map: NTS 38A4 (untitled)

Climbing
- First ascent: May 8, 1994

Qiajivik Mountain is a mountain in Qikiqtaaluk, Nunavut, Canada. Located in northeastern Baffin Island, it is part of the Baffin Mountains. At 1,965 m (6,447 ft) Qiajivik is the highest mountain in northern Baffin Island and with a topographic prominence of 1,787 m (5,863 ft) it is one of Canada's 142 ultra-prominent peaks.

== See also ==
- Mountain peaks of Canada
- List of Ultras of North America
