= Coronation Glacier =

Glacier in Canada

Coordinates: 67°06′33″N 064°51′05″W

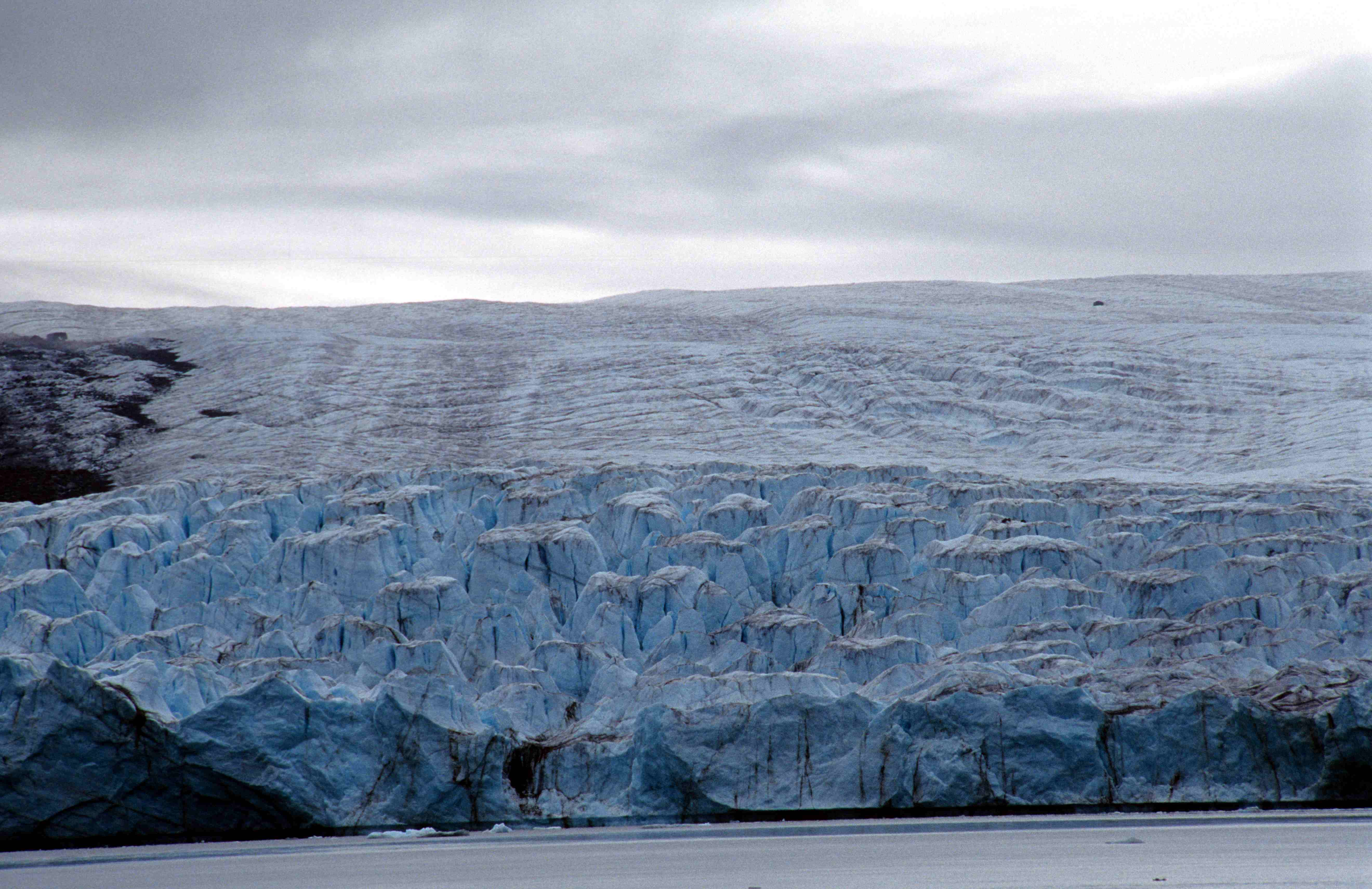
Coronation Glacier, north-eastern coast of Cumberland Peninsula

Coronation Glacier is a glacier on southeastern Baffin Island, Nunavut, Canada. The glacier is on the northeast coast of Cumberland Peninsula and is an outlet glacier of the Penny Ice Cap. The Coronation Glacier lost its connection to the Elena Glacier between 1943 and 1949.

== See also ==
- Royal eponyms in Canada
