= Bill Borger =

Canadian accountant

Bill Borger Jr.
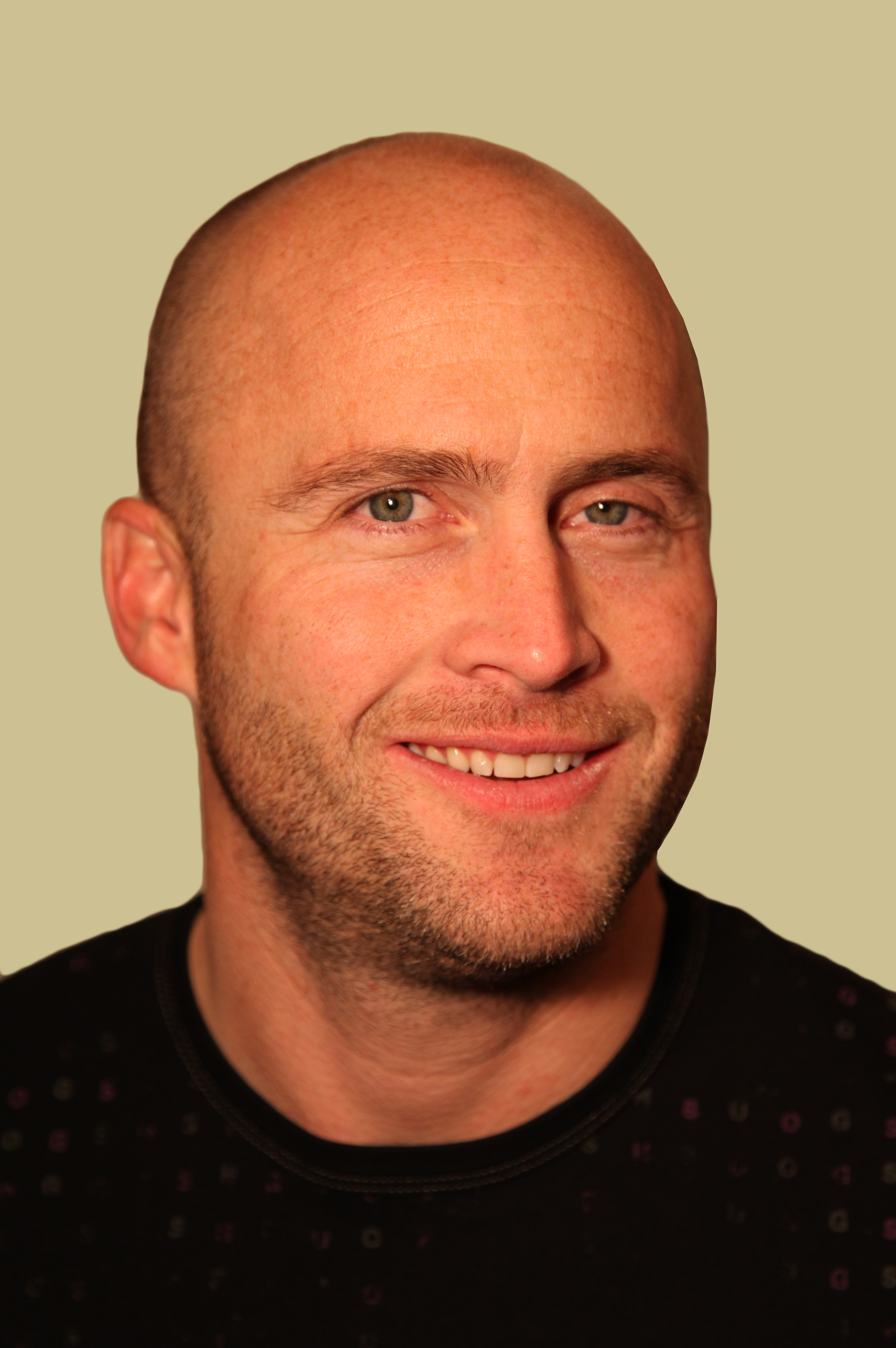
- Bill Borger in 2011
- Born: 15 December 1974; Edmonton, Alberta

Bill Borger Jr. (born 15 December 1974) is a Canadian businessman, adventurer, and Canadian Chartered Accountant. On September 9, 2000 Borger became the first Calgarian to successfully swim the English Channel. As a part of the English Channel swim Borger raised $100,000 for the Canadian Mental Health Association. On May 11, 2011 Borger became the first Canadian to have both swum the English Channel and to have climbed Mount Everest. The Mount Everest climb was used to raise funds for the Calgary Handibus Association; for this charity Borger raised $400,000. Borger's website states, as of June 6, 2011 that monies raised for the Calgary Handibus Association are $502,350. The combined efforts of climbing Mount Everest and swimming the English Channel placed Borger as the fifth person ever to do so; these combined events are known as Peak and Pond.

Bill Borger is currently the President of the Borger Group of Companies.

== Mountain climbing ==
Borger began climbing in 2000 and, from 2009 to 2011, had climbed over 40 peaks in North and South America, Asia, and Europe including Mount Rainier and Denali in North America and The Matterhorn and Mont Blanc in Europe (the highest peak in the Alps).

On July 14, 2012 Bill Borger along with climbing partner John Furneaux set a new route during their summit of Mount Thor that they named, The Great Escape. This climb was also the first free climb of the Southwest Face.

== Swimming ==
July 23, 2000, Borger placed third on the 26.4 km long Lake Zurich Swim with a time of 8h 52m 45 sec.

September 9, 2000, Borger crossed the 21-mile English Channel. The feat took him 12 hours and 11 minutes of continuous swimming without a wetsuit.

== Cycling ==
In 1996, Borger cycled across Canada in 32 days.
