= Mount Thor =

Mountain in Nunavut, Canada

- Thor Peak, Qaisualuk, Kigutinnguaq
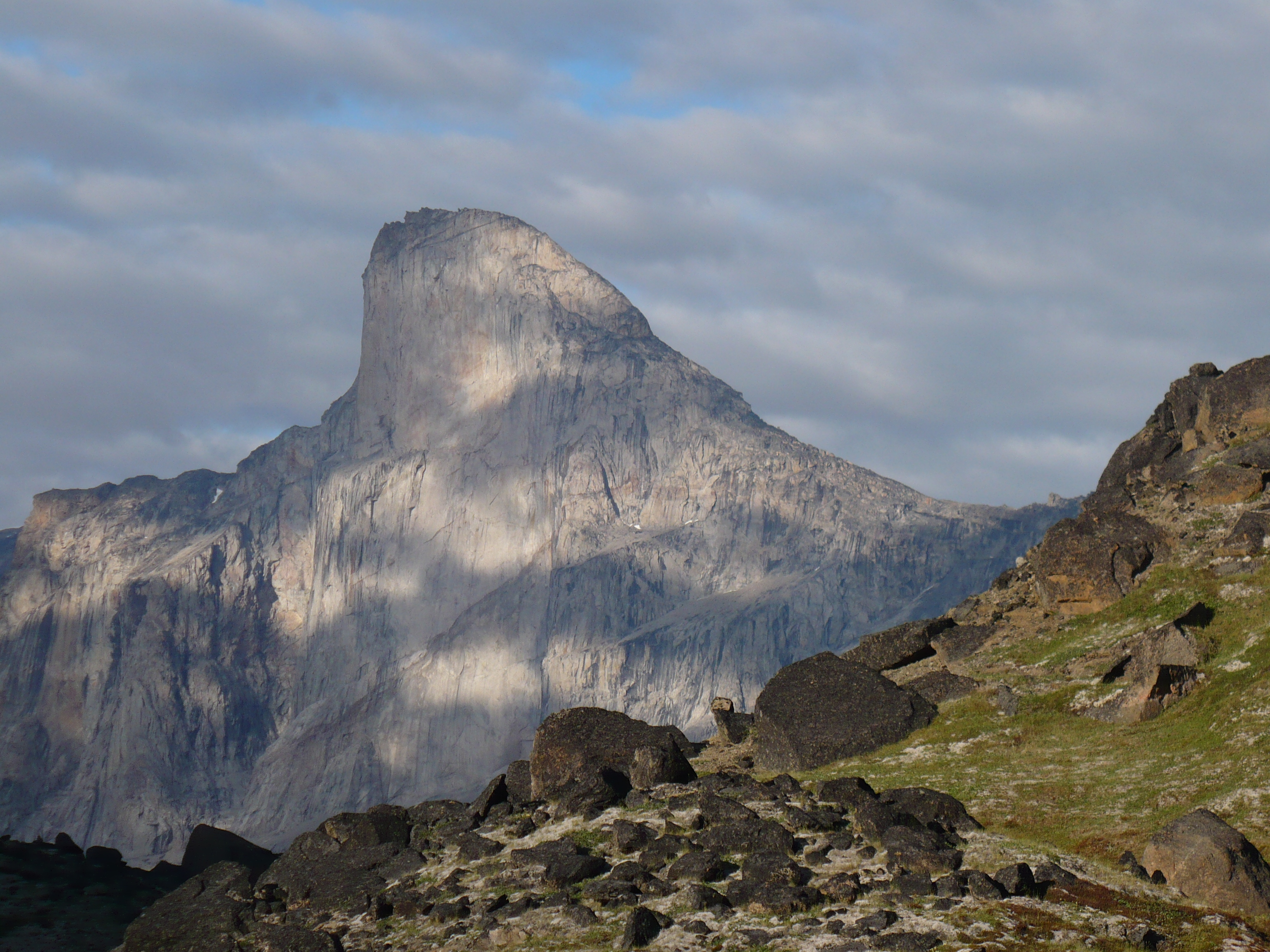
- Mount Thor seen from Akshayuk Pass

Highest point
- Elevation: 1,675 m (5,495 ft)
- Listing: Mountains of Canada
- Coordinates: 66°32′N 65°19′W

Naming
- Native name: Qaisualuk (Inuktitut); Kigutinnguaq (Inuktitut)

Geography
- Location within Nunavut
- Interactive map of Mount Thor
- Location: Nunavut, Canada
- Parent range: Baffin Mountains
- Topo map: NTS 26I11 Mount Asgard

Climbing
- First ascent: Morton and Spitzer, 1965

Mount Thor, officially gazetted as Thor Peak (Inuktitut syllabics: ᙯᕐᓱᐊᓗᒃ, Inuktitut: Qaisualuk "huge bedrock", or Kigutinnguaq "tooth-like"), in Nunavut, Canada, is a mountain with an elevation of 1,675 m (5,495 ft) located in Auyuittuq National Park, on Baffin Island. The mountain is located 46 km (29 mi) northeast of Pangnirtung and features Earth's greatest vertical drop of 1,200 m (4,100 ft), with the cliff overhanging at an average angle of 105 degrees (15 degrees from vertical). Despite its remoteness, this feature makes the mountain a popular rock climbing site. Camping is allowed, with several designated campsites located throughout the length of Akshayuk Pass. For climbers looking to scale Mount Thor, there is an established campsite a few kilometres north of its base, complete with windbreaks and emergency shelters.

The English naming of the mountain originates from Thor, the Norse thunder god.

== Geography ==
Mount Thor is part of the Baffin Mountains which in turn form part of the Arctic Cordillera mountain range.

== Geology ==
This mountain consists of solid granite. The rock making up this formation have been metamorphosed multiple times through earth's history, causing this granitic layer to be pushed through other layers. The age of the rock ranges from 570 million years to 3.5 billion years (Precambrian), making it some of the oldest rock on earth.

The peak and vertical drop itself are a product of glacial erosion, carved over millennia by seasonal glacial activity through the Akshayuk Pass, on the rim of which this mountain sits. Like other glacial channels, this pass has the characteristic U-shape which gives the mountain its vertical drop.

== Ascents ==
Donald Morton and Lyman Spitzer made the first recorded ascent of Mount Thor in 1965 during the Alpine Club of Canada expedition led by Pat Baird. Pat Baird also led the 1953 geophysical expedition during which Hans Weber, J. Rothlisberger and F. Schwarzenbach climbed the North Tower of Mount Asgard for the first time.

The first ascent of the west face was achieved by Earl Redfern, John Bagley, Eric Brand and Tom Bepler in 1985. The first solo ascent of the West Face was made by Yasushi Yamanoi in 1988. In 1998, Jason 'Singer' Smith made a second solo ascent of the West Face. The first free climb of the Southwest Buttress was made in 2012 by Bill Borger and John Furneaux.

== Gallery ==
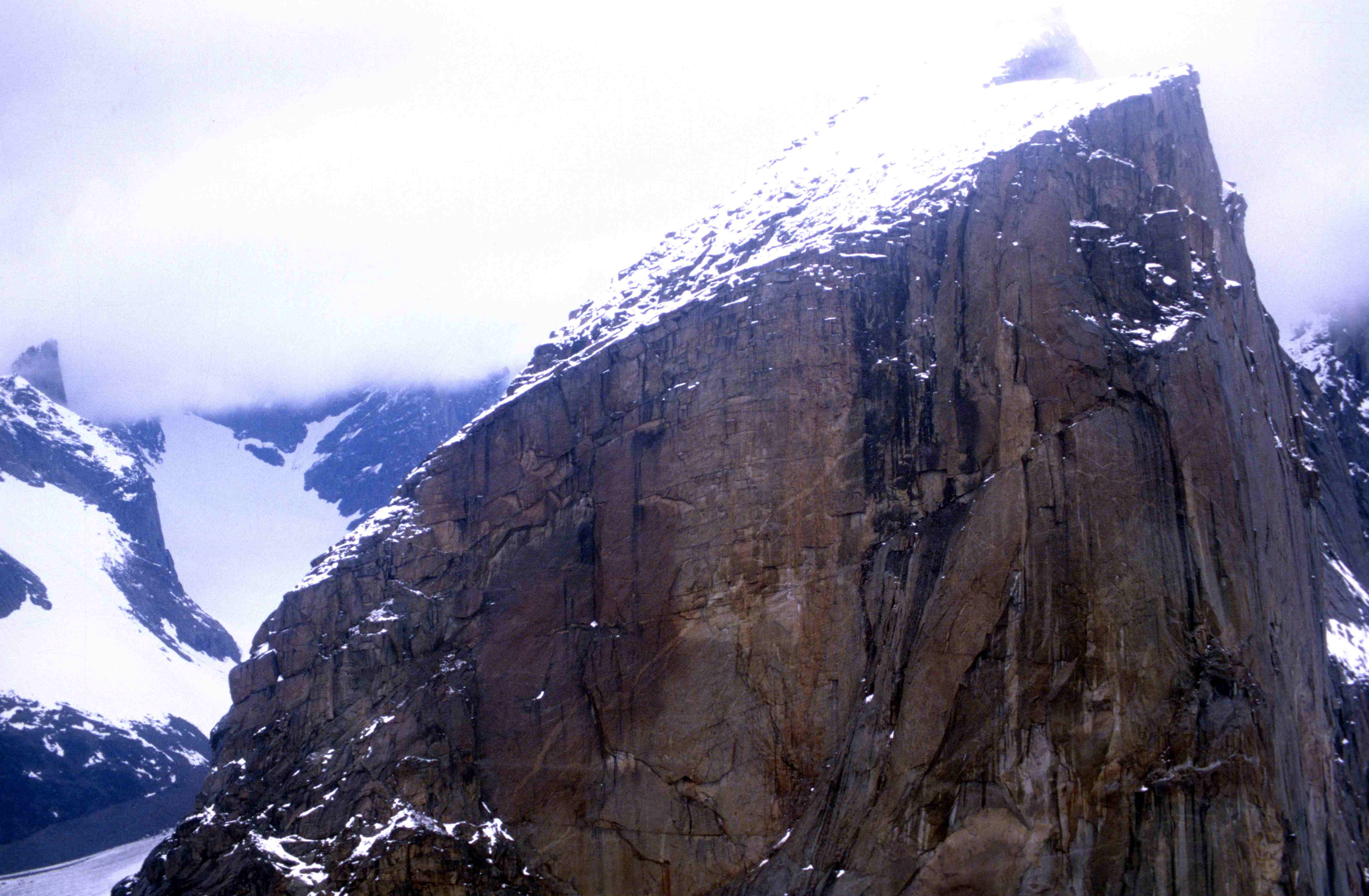
View of Mount Thor summit in 1997

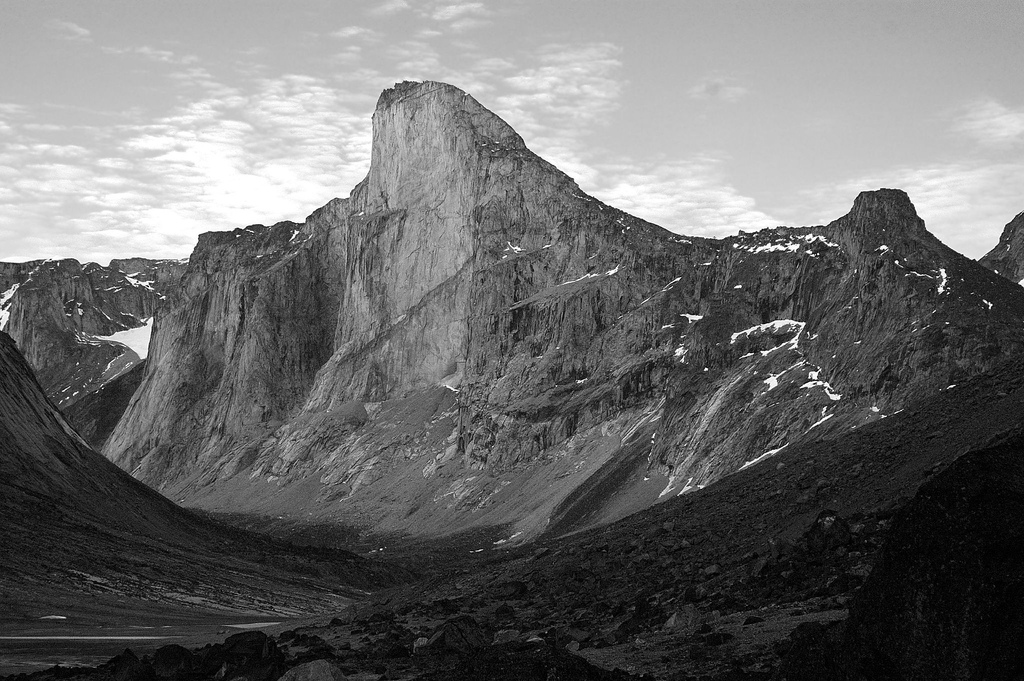
Mount Thor and its steep cliff

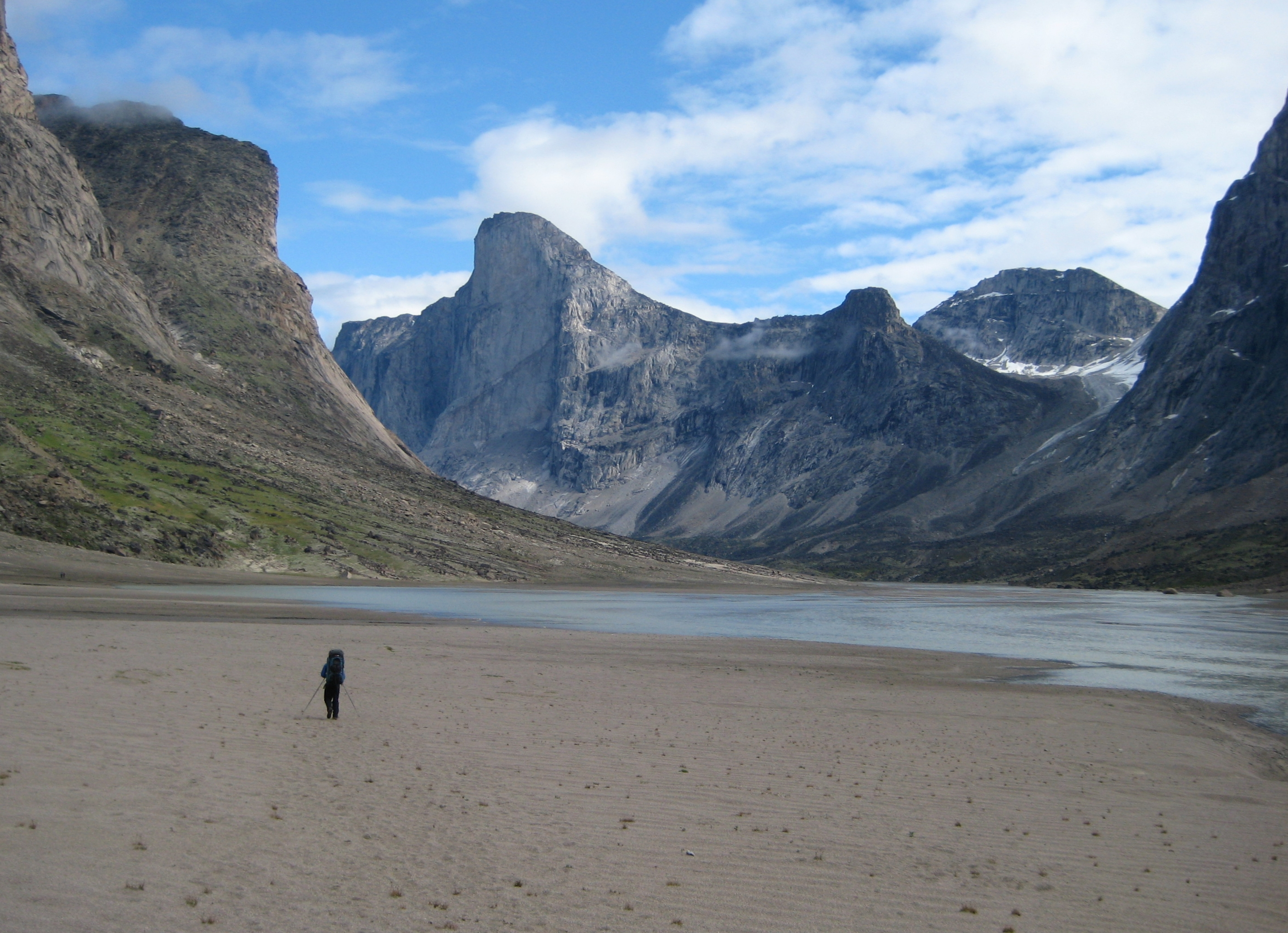
Hiking north towards Thor Peak, July 2007

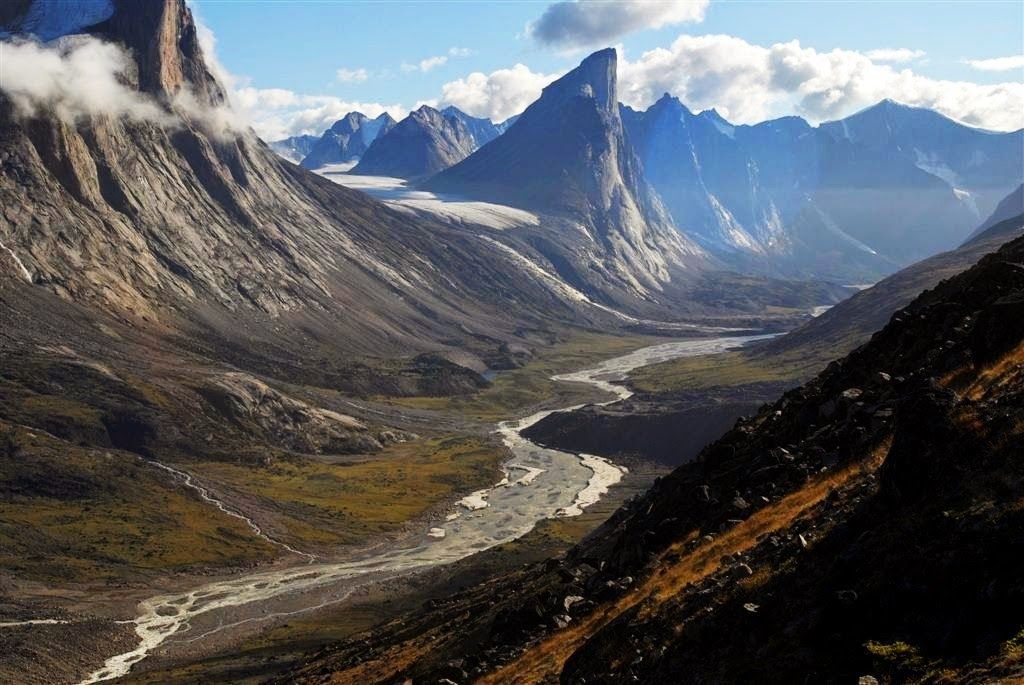
Mount Thor on the rim of Akshayuk Pass, showing the U-shaped glacial valley

== See also ==
- Trango Towers – the tallest near-vertical drop on Earth
- Cerro Torre
- Half Dome
