= Blacha, Ávila =

Coordinates: 40°33′45″N 4°58′57″W

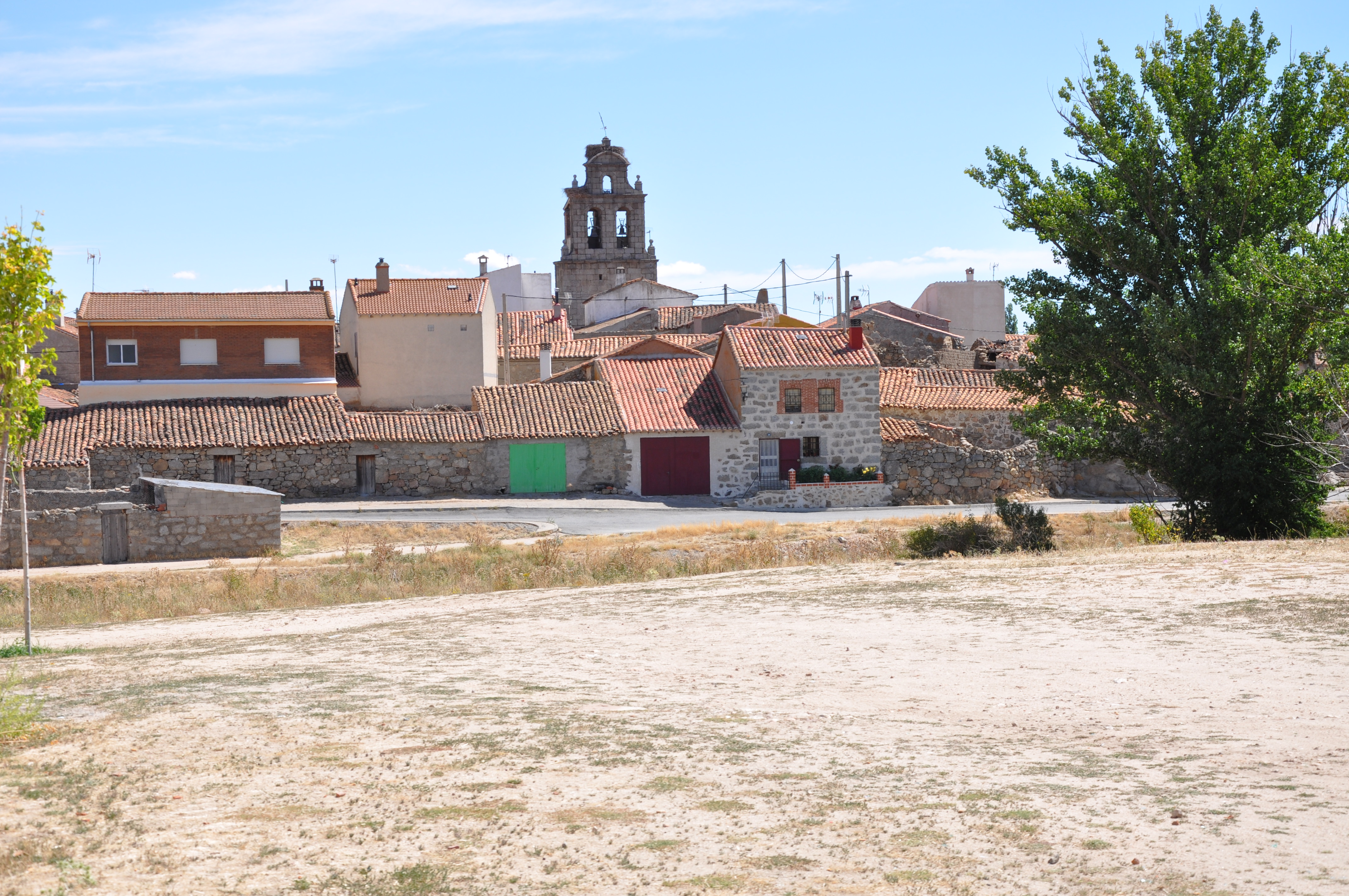
Blacha

Blacha is a minor local entity in the La Torre municipality, province of Ávila, Castile and León, Spain.

According to the 2011 European Union census, its population was 79. In 2016 population was 73.
