= North American Arctic =

Geographic region

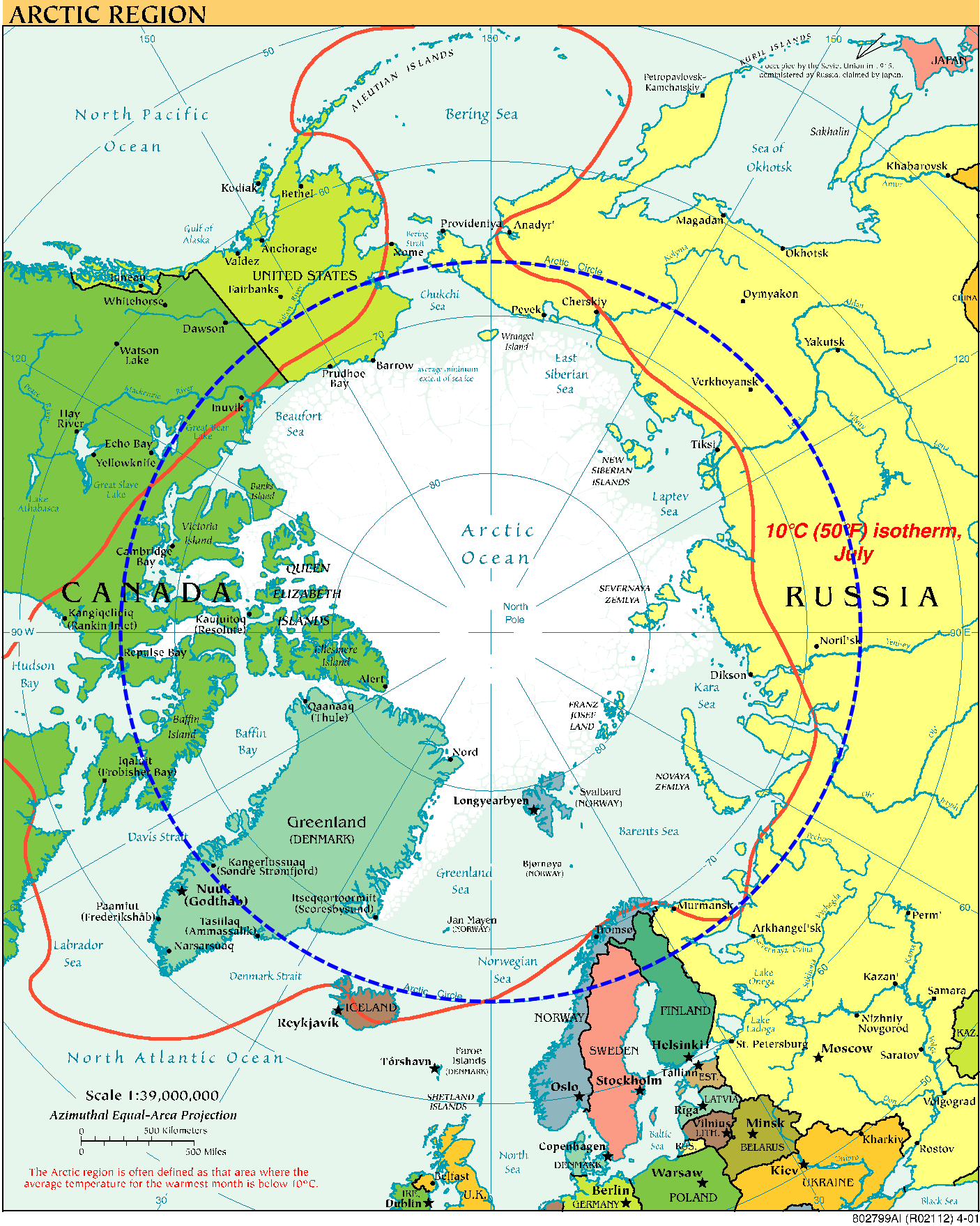
Map of the Arctic Circle and July isotherm. The North American Arctic is on the left

The North American Arctic is composed of the northern polar regions of Alaska (USA), Northern Canada and Greenland. Major bodies of water include the Arctic Ocean, Hudson Bay, the Gulf of Alaska and North Atlantic Ocean. The North American Arctic lies above the Arctic Circle. It is part of the Arctic, which is the northernmost region on Earth. The western limit is the Seward Peninsula and the Bering Strait. The southern limit is the Arctic Circle latitude of 66° 33’N, which is the approximate limit of the midnight sun and the polar night.

The Arctic region is defined by environmental limits where the average temperature for the warmest month (July) is below 10 °C (50 °F). The northernmost tree line roughly follows the isotherm at the boundary of this region. The climate of the region is known to be intensely cold during the year due to its extreme polar location. The area has tundra, Arctic vegetation, glaciers, and, for most of the year, is covered in thick blankets of snow and ice.

It is home to various species of plants, and land, air and marine animals. Due to the severe weather conditions, the region's flora and fauna has had to adapt to survive. In addition to the extreme climate, permafrost and short growing seasons means that trees are unable to grow. The indigenous peoples who migrated from other lands and settled in the North American Arctic also had to adapt to living conditions. Their population has declined since then, however.

Climate change in the Arctic has caused the region to feel the effects of global warming, with sea levels and temperatures rising, and a changing wildlife population. Marine ecosystems are struggling under increasing pressure from changes in sea ice characteristics. The effects of climate change have also impacted the human population whose way of living and working is facing pressure from the effects as they are finding it challenging to adapt.

== Geography ==
The North American Arctic geographical region consists of large land masses. A major portion of the region also consists of large bodies of water. This region is a relatively flat topographic part of the Earth. Since the region is located in an extreme northerly part of the Earth, the sun may only appear above the horizon for a couple of hours during winter while appearing for longer during summer.

== Lands ==
The major lands that make up the North American Arctic from west to east are:

Name of land	Country
Alaska	United States
Yukon, Northwest Territories, Nunavut	Canada
Greenland	Denmark

=== Alaska ===
Alaska has endless lowlands and plains. On the northern coast of Alaska, there is a 67-day-long period of darkness which begins in mid-November and ends in February. An 84-day-long period of light begins in early May and finishes in July.

=== Northern Canada ===
The Arctic portion in Northern Canada covers around a quarter of Canada's landmass at 1.6 million square kilometres (0.62 million square miles). The human population density is one of the lowest on Earth and sits at 1 person per 100 km^{2}. It consists of some of the world's most uninhabitable places yet also is home to extensive herds of caribou. It also contains vast ice fields, mountain glaciers, mountain peaks, shattered rock, ponds, lakes and U-shaped valleys. This region supports approximately 140 species of vascular plants and 600 species of mosses and lichens. There are about 20 species of mammals and 80 bird species.

=== Greenland ===
Greenland is considered an alpine region of the North American Arctic. Vegetation that grows in this area is confined to mostly narrow coastal ice-free fringes which constitutes about 14% of the total area. Poor floras occur in the colder coastal areas in the northern parts of the country while rich floras occur in the southwest parts and inland in the south.

== Waters ==
The North American Arctic consists of some of the following major bodies of water:

- Arctic Ocean
- Hudson Bay
- Gulf of Alaska
- North Atlantic Ocean

== Climate ==
The North American Arctic's climate is characterized by extremely cold temperatures throughout the year. It also experiences high seasonal fluctuations in daylight, and severe winds due to the Earth's tilt and its polar location. During the year, temperatures can span a widespread range with average lows that reach around −38 °C (−36 °F) in winter to average highs that reach approximately 10 °C (50 °F) in summer. The warmest month is July while the coldest month is January. Winters have long dark days without sunlight while summers have days where the sun doesn't set. Parts of the region are covered in ice for most of the year and it can snow during any month of the year and the average annual precipitation is 250 mm (9.8 in).

== Wildlife ==
The region has an abundance of wildlife that has adapted to its intense conditions, ranging from large mammals such as polar bears and muskox, to small birds, and various species of plants. Marine life includes walrus, seals, fish and microscopic ocean organisms such as algae and plankton. The many lakes and rivers are home to fish species such as Arctic char and lake trout.

=== Plants ===
Major types of vegetation of the North American Arctic include tundra, polar desert and polar semi-deserts with minor ones being coastal salt marshes and grasslands. Flora must try to grow in a harsh environment that experiences continuous sunlight during the summer, and low temperatures, dry winds, heavy snow and frozen ground and soil throughout the year. Freezing and thawing of soil affects vegetation patterns as it results in formations of patterned ground such as circles, nets and stone stripes. Both plant diversity and species are relatively low in numbers due to lack of nutrient availability. There is evidence that shows that diversity of species in the region is strongly correlated to warmer temperatures.

Due to permafrost, a short growing season, and dark and long winters of strong winds and extreme cold, the region experiences being almost treeless with only vegetation such as moss and lichen being able to live. Although not many species of plants succeed in surviving in this environment, the ones that do tend to be small and have a short seasonal life cycle, with the exception of algae which has been observed to have the ability to survive all year round. Even though annual precipitation is extremely low, there are numerous lakes, ponds and wetlands that are able to support relatively lush vegetation. The cycle often begins in spring, with major growth during July before the end of August when winter is about to arrive and ends the cycle.

Plants that have adapted to the climate in the region have the ability to grow rapidly in the small timeframe of prime growing conditions in summer due to their ability to conserve water. Plants avoid the harsh wind and chill by growing close to the ground and cluster densely. Other ways that plants have adapted include having a smaller surface area to lessen water evaporation, vertical leaves to aid in receiving more sunlight, waxy leaves to assist in moisture retention, and antifreeze to enable them to continue photosynthesis under freezing conditions.

=== Animals ===
Compared to warmer regions of the Earth, fauna species in the North American Arctic are small but populations are large. The animal population can either hibernate if conditions allow it or has to remain active as it is unable to hibernate due to absence of ice-free shelter in the region. This is also the reason why there aren't any reptiles and only a small number of amphibians. Though numbers are depleting, the region is home to other marine life such as different species of whales and seals. The region supports an enormous population of migratory birds that migrate to the region in the summer for breeding and many large fisheries. Due to ice melting and turning into ponds during summer, the ecosystem also sees insects including moths and mosquitoes.

Some animals have adapted to the conditions in the region by conserving heat, with many species covered in heavy fur coats and having thick layers of fat beneath the skin while others have developed compact body shapes. They are characterized as having shorter legs and tails, and smaller ears compared to their relatives. Many species of animals have stiff fur on their feet to create a barrier between their pads and toes, and the snow which allows them to walk more easily. Despite almost being frozen, some insects can survive by going into a dormant state and allowing their naturally occurring antifreeze-like compounds to take effect. The most common coping strategy, however, is to migrate seasonally and find a more suitable habitat for the winter, which can commonly be seen in birds.

Animals have a small window of opportunity to successfully reproduce and birth of their young has to coincide with the abundance of prey otherwise the food chain will be disrupted. Species that have adapted well tend to dominate the food chain.

== People ==
The population of the region is sparse, and its people are thought to be descendants of people who migrated northward from central Asia after the Ice Age. They include the Inuit, Yupik, Aleut, Athabascans and Iñupiat. After living in the North American Arctic for over thousands of years, they have developed unique traditions in order to adapt to the extreme climate conditions such as hunting animals and fishing during specific times of the year and gathering and preserving plants over the summer in preparation for winter. They constructed tents, clothes, tools and weapons out of animal skin, antlers, teeth, horns and bones.

Due to Western culture, native peoples now make up approximately 16% of the population of Alaska and they now live in wooden homes, and purchase clothing and food. Climate change has also affected the traditional way of life, which doesn't exist for most anymore, as melting ice has impacted hunting and fishing. Some communities are under threat from coastal erosion and it has already driven other communities to relocate.

== Climate change ==
Climate change, which is a phenomenon also known as the greenhouse effect, is the warming that occurs when certain gases in the atmosphere prevent heat from escaping. The North American Arctic is particularly susceptible to the effects of climate change compared to other regions. Climate change has caused the temperature in the region to rise, extreme weather events, changing wildlife populations and habitats, and sea ice to melt resulting in rising sea levels. In November 2016, the daily average temperature was 2.22 °C (36.00 °F) lower than usual and sea ice cover was less than the previous recorded low in November 2012.

Ice sheets have been observed to form later, separate earlier, and rapidly decline in age, thickness distribution and regional coverage. The ice in the southern Beaufort Sea separates 7 weeks earlier than it used to during 1964 to 1974. An instance of climate change contributing to ice loss was the 13th most extreme Arctic storm recorded that impacted sea ice in the Beaufort and Chukchi seas. In 2012, a cyclone had formed over Siberia and ended in the Canadian Arctic Archipelago during a period where large wave generation, oceanic upwelling, and mechanical forcing affected the ocean and its covering ice sheets.

There is also potential for carbon dioxide and methane levels to rise in the atmosphere as a result of increased production by micro-organisms in thawing permafrost. Climate change will significantly impact the plant species by causing an increase of shrubs, which will disrupt the regional vegetation, and a decrease in certain species of flora. It has also caused a decline in survival rates of fauna which will cause a heavy strain on the ecosystem.

Climate change in the region has attracted worldwide attention and interest in reduction of effects. This is because effects to the North American Arctic has direct consequences on the rest of the world including sea levels rising worldwide. The rising of sea levels is a critical issue as the region plays a role in the ventilation of the Atlantic and Pacific, and due to the impact that melting sea ice has on the acceleration of global warming and increased fluxes of green house gases into the atmosphere.

== Gallery ==
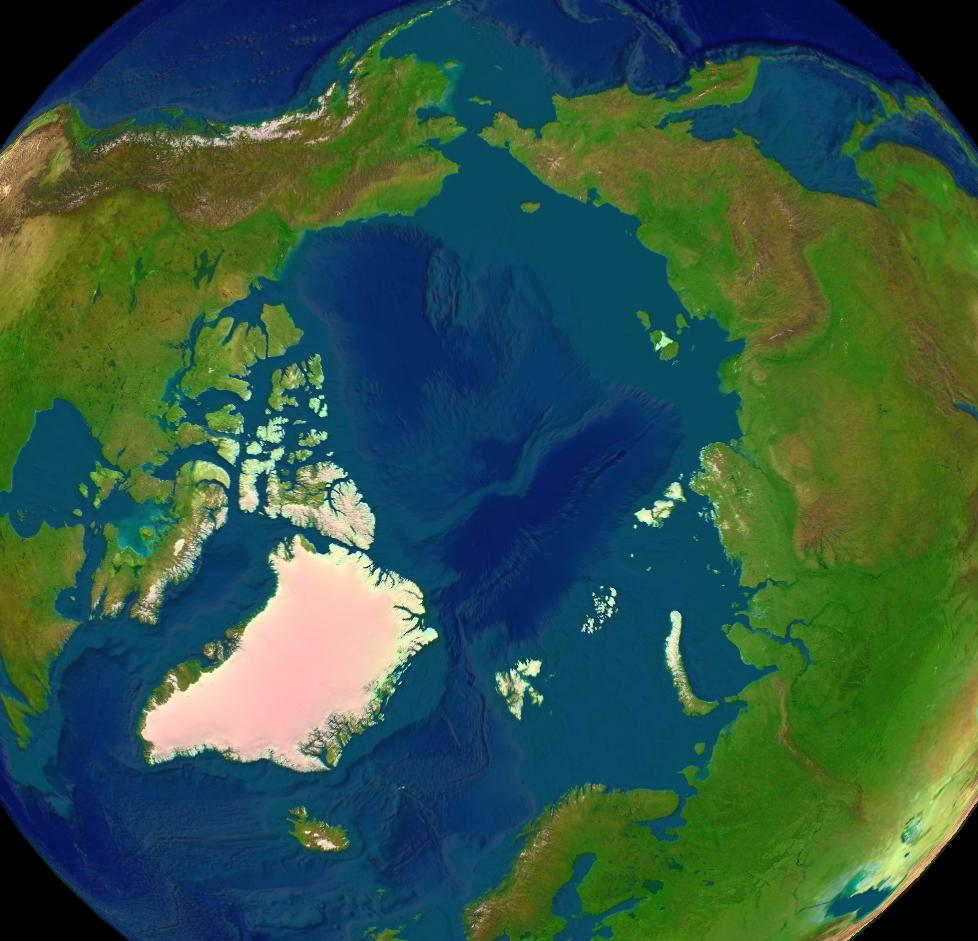
Artificially coloured topographical map of the Arctic region

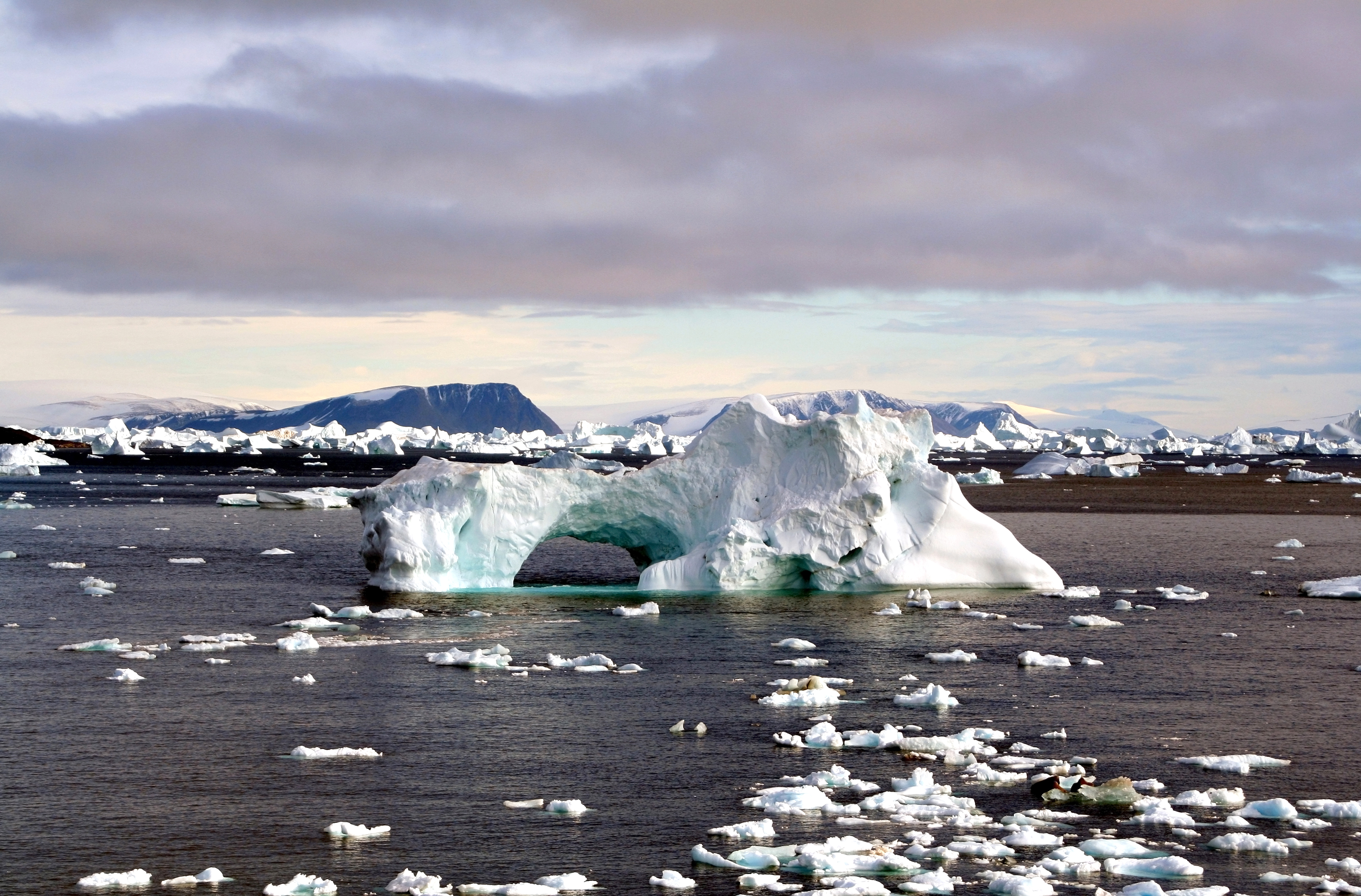
Icebergs at Cape York, Greenland
