= Auyuittuq National Park =

National park in Nunavut, Canada

- Parc national Auyuittuq
- IUCN category II (national park)
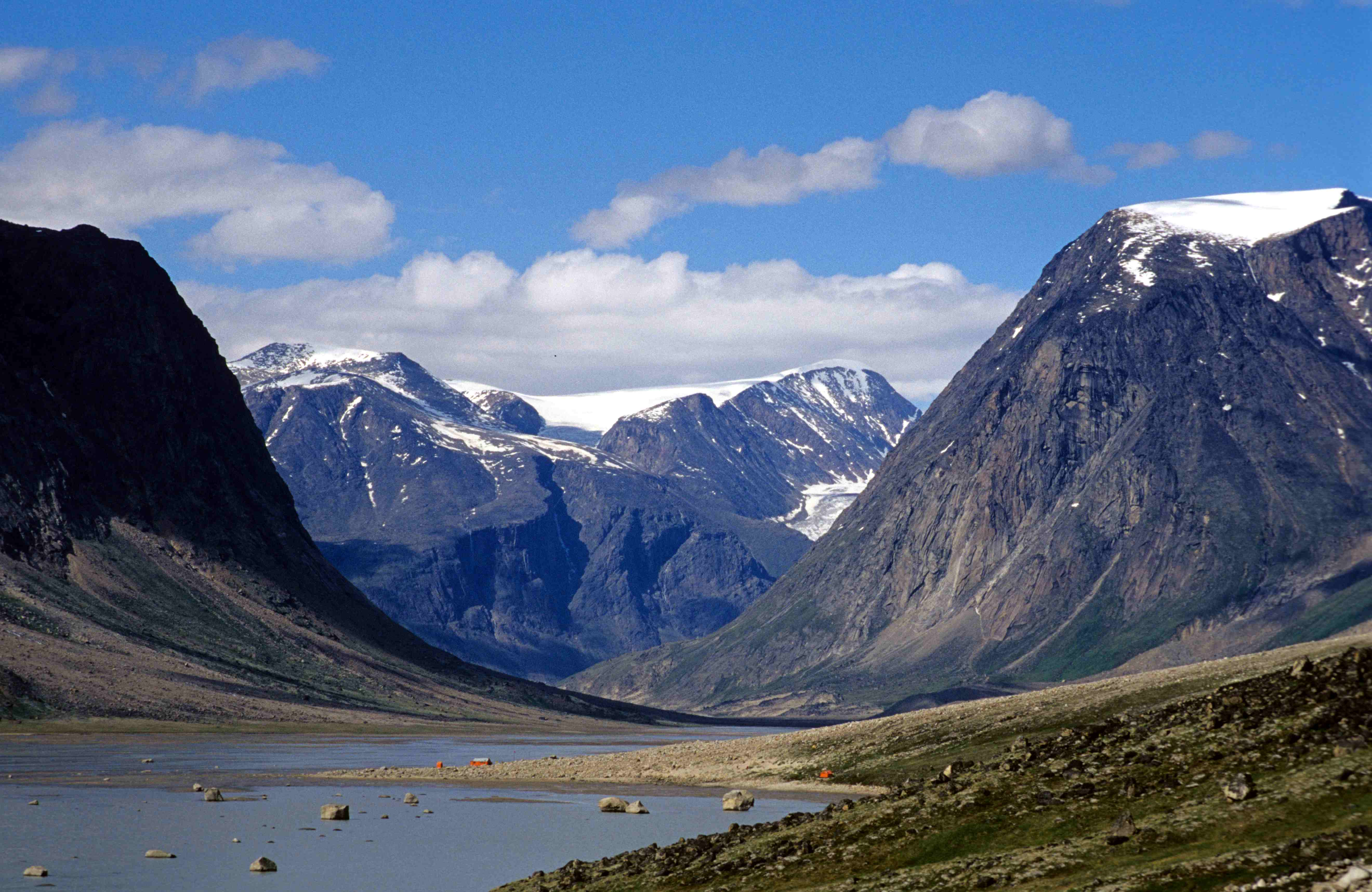
- Pangnirtung Fiord and the Weasel River Valley

- Location within Canada Location within Nunavut
- Interactive map of Auyuittuq National Park
- Location: Nunavut, Canada
- Nearest city: Pangnirtung, Qikiqtarjuaq
- Coordinates: 67°53′N 65°01′W
- Area: 21,470 km^{2} (8,290 sq mi)
- Established: 1972
- Visitors: 256 (in 2022–23)
- Governing body: Parks Canada

Auyuittuq National Park (Inuktitut: ᐊᐅᔪᐃᑦᑐᖅ, IPA: [aujuitːuq], "the land that never melts") is a national park located on Baffin Island's Cumberland Peninsula, in the Qikiqtaaluk Region of Nunavut, the largest political subdivision of Canada.

The park was initially known as Baffin Island National Park when it was established in 1972, but the name was changed in 1976 to its current name to better reflect the region and its history. It features many terrains of Arctic wilderness, such as fjords, glaciers, and ice fields. Although Auyuittuq was established in 1972 as a national park reserve, it was upgraded to a full national park in 2000.

== Location and access ==
Auyuittuq National Park is located on the Cumberland Peninsula of Baffin Island in Nunavut. The park is mostly located within the Arctic Circle. The park covers 21,470 square kilometres (8,290 sq mi) (Note: The Municipality of Pangnirtung website states that the park measures 19,089 square kilometres (7,370 sq mi).) and is located partially within the Penny Highlands and contains the 6,000 km^{2} (2,300 sq mi) Penny Ice Cap. The Penny Ice Cap, made of ice sitting on Precambrian granite, creates a series of glaciers, among them the Coronation Glacier. The land reflects the geological history of the area, with deep valleys between the peaks, which include Mount Asgard with an 800 m (2,600 ft) face, and Mount Thor with a 1,250 m (4,100 ft) face. Along the coast are deep, narrow fjords. In Akshayuk Pass, the winds can reach 175 km/h (109 mph).

The nearest towns are Qikiqtarjuaq and Pangnirtung. Visitors wishing to enter the park are required by Parks Canada to register at the park office in Pangnirtung or Qikiqtarjuaq, and attend an orientation session. Park user fees apply.

== History ==
First established in 1972 as Baffin Island National Park, in 1975, Parks Canada chose to rename the park in order to better reflect the landscape and the Inuit history within the region. After some debate, the name was changed to Auyuittuq National Park, which is an Inuktitut word meaning "the place that does not melt".

== Flora and fauna ==
Little vegetation can be found in Auyuittuq Park, although the plants found there range from flowers such as mountain avens, campion, Papaver, and saxifrage to shrubs like dwarf birch, Arctic willow, and heather. Many of the plants in Auyuittuq Park grow in clumps to create their own warmer "microclimate" to survive the harsh Arctic conditions.

Because of the exceptionally low vegetation supply on land, wildlife is very scarce. However, the park is bordered on three sides by sea and marine life is found within the park's boundaries. Species that live in Auyuittuq Park include lemmings (both the North American brown lemming and the northern collared lemming), red foxes, snowy owls, peregrine falcons, ermines, rough-legged hawks, gyrfalcons, beluga whales, snow geese, polar bears, wolves, narwhals, Canada geese, Arctic foxes, Arctic hares, and some barren-ground caribou.

== Activities ==
The most common backpacking route in the park is known as Akshayuk Pass, and follows the Weasel and Owl rivers via Summit Lake. In 2008, heavy rain and warm weather caused Summit Lake to burst through its banks, flooding the Weasel River and washing away the Windy Lake bridge. As a result, the hiking routes in the pass are limited to either side of the Weasel River.

== See also ==
- National Parks of Canada
- List of Nunavut parks
- Arctic Cordillera
