= Penny Ice Cap =

Ice cap in Nunavut, Canada

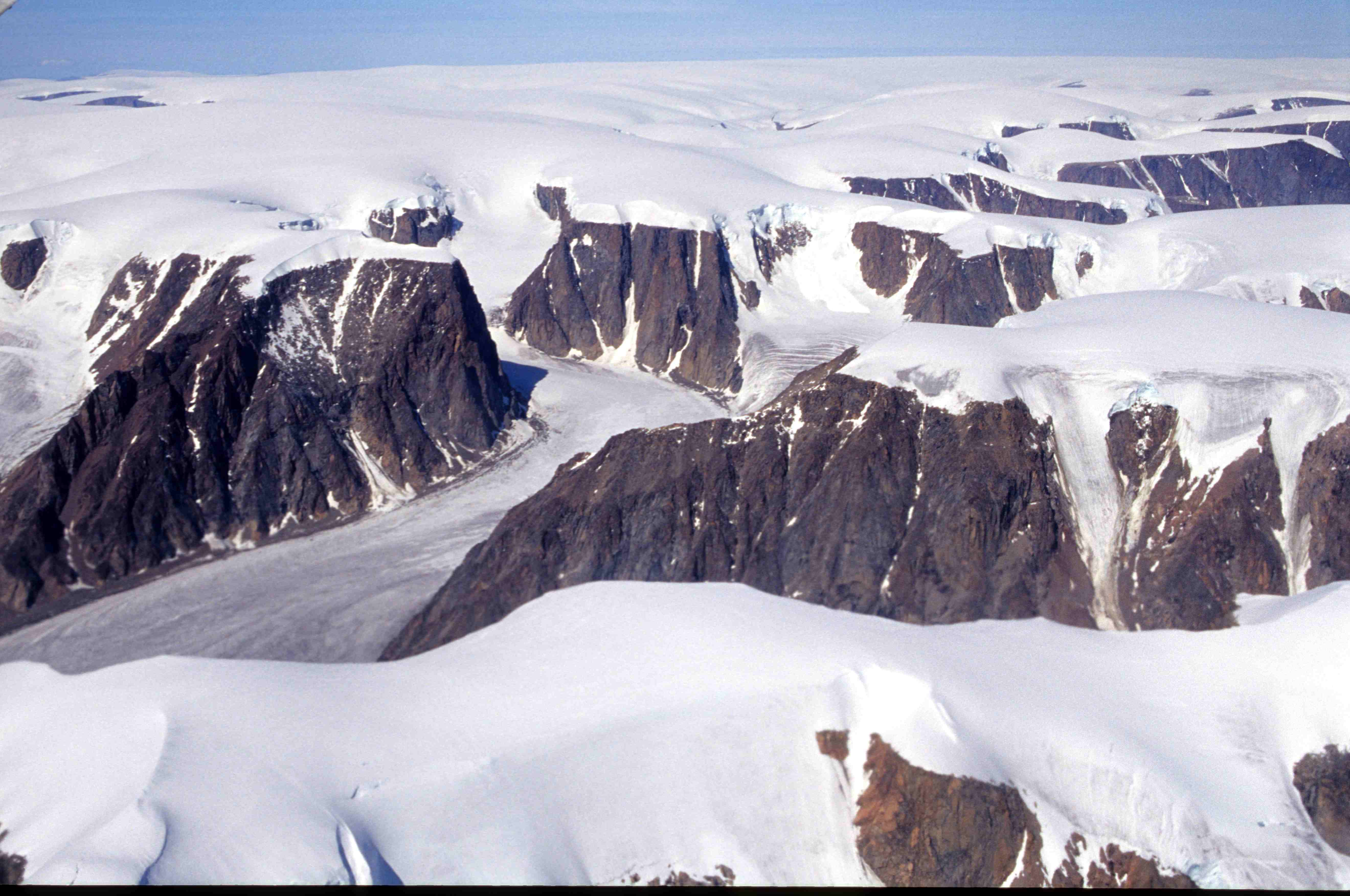
- The Penny Ice Cap

- Location within Nunavut
- Type: Ice cap
- Location: Nunavut, Canada
- Coordinates: 67°17′N 66°13′W OAMSC
- Terminus: outflow glaciers

The Penny Ice Cap, formerly Penny Icecap, is a 6,000 km^{2} (2,300 sq mi) ice cap in Auyuittuq National Park of Baffin Island, Nunavut, Canada. It forms a 2,000 m (6,562 ft) high barrier on the Cumberland Peninsula, an area of deep fjords and glaciated valleys. It is a remnant of the Laurentide ice sheet. During the mid-1990s, Canadian researchers studied the glacier's patterns of freezing and thawing over centuries by drilling ice core samples.

The ice cap has been thinning and its valley glaciers have been retreating in recent decades related to rising summer and winter air temperatures across the eastern Arctic.

The ice cap is named after Captain William Penny, a whaling captain from Aberdeen, Scotland. Penny pioneered over-wintering with Inuit at Cumberland Sound in the 19th century so that he could begin whaling much earlier in the season than his competitors. He was also engaged by Lady Jane Franklin to search for John Franklin and his lost expedition, who had gone missing with all his crew in the search for the Northwest Passage.

== See also ==
- List of glaciers
