= Baffin Mountains =

Mountain range in Nunavut, Canada

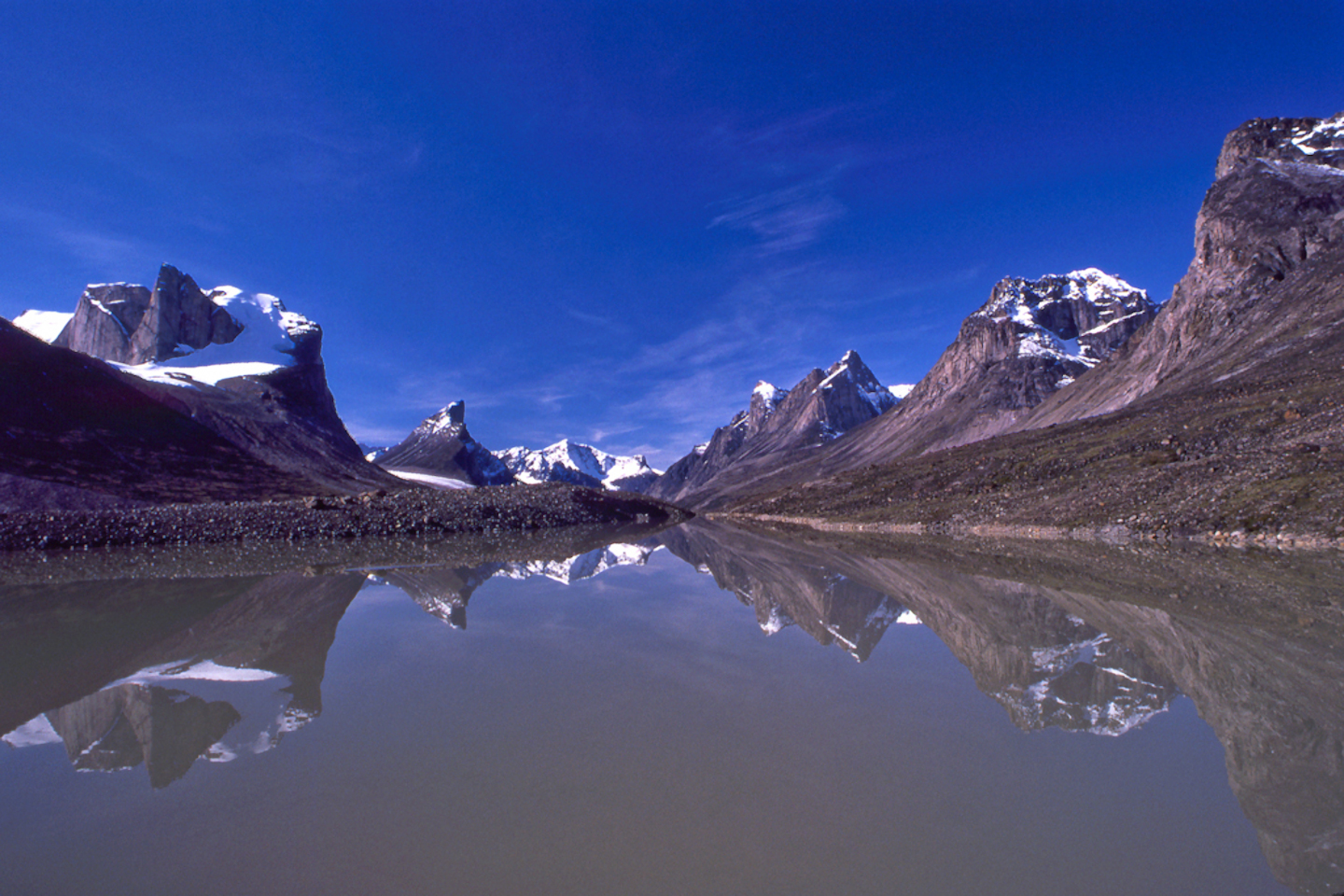
- Summit Lake, mountains, Auyuittuq National Park

Highest point
- Peak: Mount Odin
- Elevation: 2,147 m (7,044 ft)
- Coordinates: 66°33′N 65°26′W

Geography
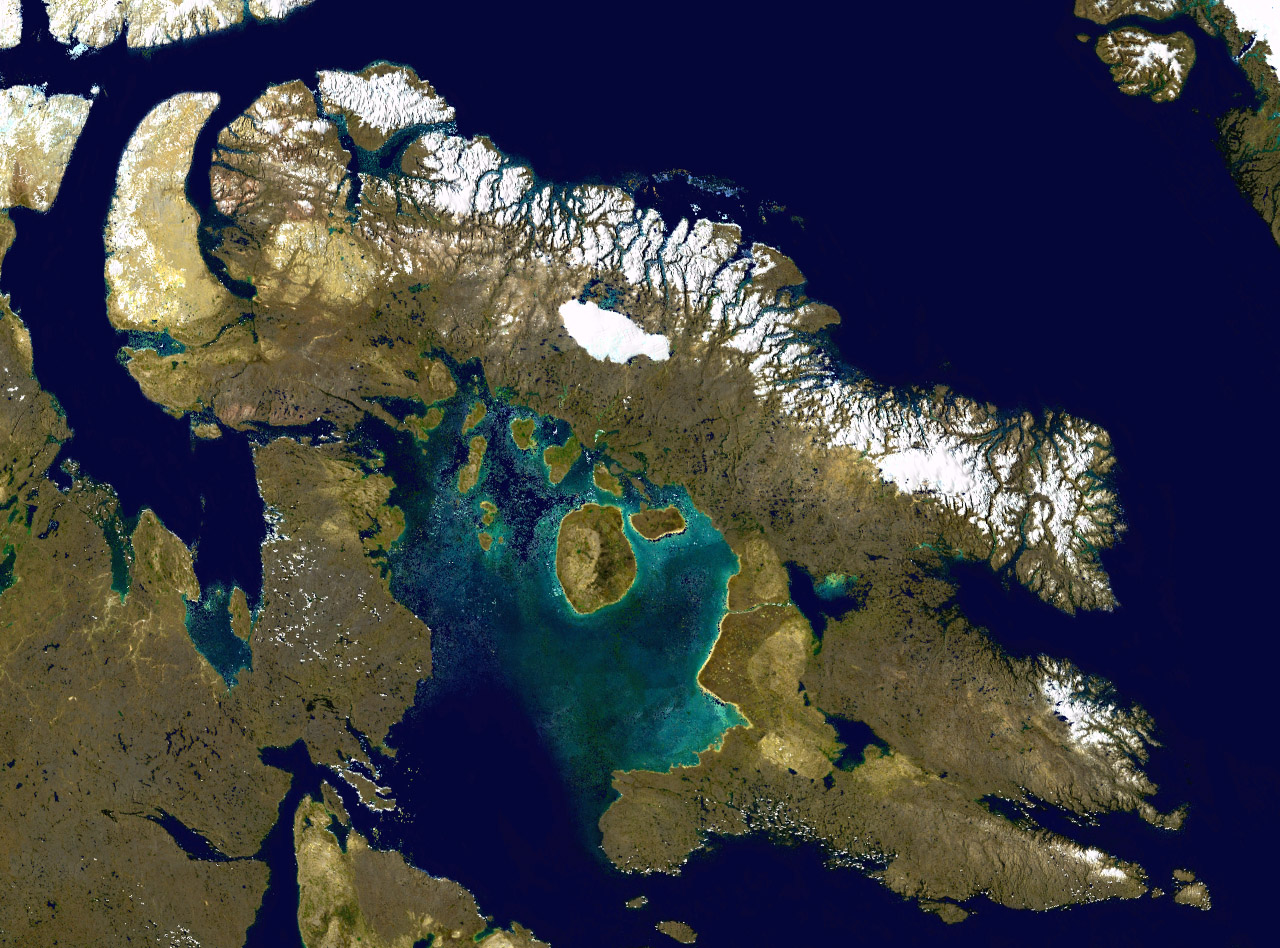
- Satellite image of Baffin Island, the Baffin Mountains are seen in northeastern Baffin Island
- Country: Canada
- Territory: Nunavut
- Regions: Baffin Island and Bylot Island
- Parent range: Arctic Cordillera

The Baffin Mountains are a mountain range running along the northeastern coast of Baffin Island and Bylot Island, Nunavut, Canada. The ice-capped mountains are part of the Arctic Cordillera and have some of the highest peaks of eastern North America, reaching a height of 1,525–2,146 metres (5,003–7,041 ft) above sea level. While they are separated by bodies of water to make Baffin Island, they are closely related to the other mountain ranges that make the much larger Arctic Cordillera mountain range.

== Terrain ==
The highest point is Mount Odin at 2,147 m (7,044 ft) while Mount Asgard (Sivanitirutinguak) at 2,015 m (6,611 ft) is perhaps the best known. The highest point in the northern Baffin Mountains is Qiajivik Mountain at 1,963 m (6,440 ft). There are no trees in the Baffin Mountains because they are north of the Arctic tree line. Rocks that compose the Baffin Mountains are primarily deeply dissected granitic rocks. They were covered with ice until about 1500 years ago, and vast parts of them are still ice-covered. Geologically, the Baffin Mountains form the eastern edge of the Canadian Shield, which covers much of Canada's landscape.

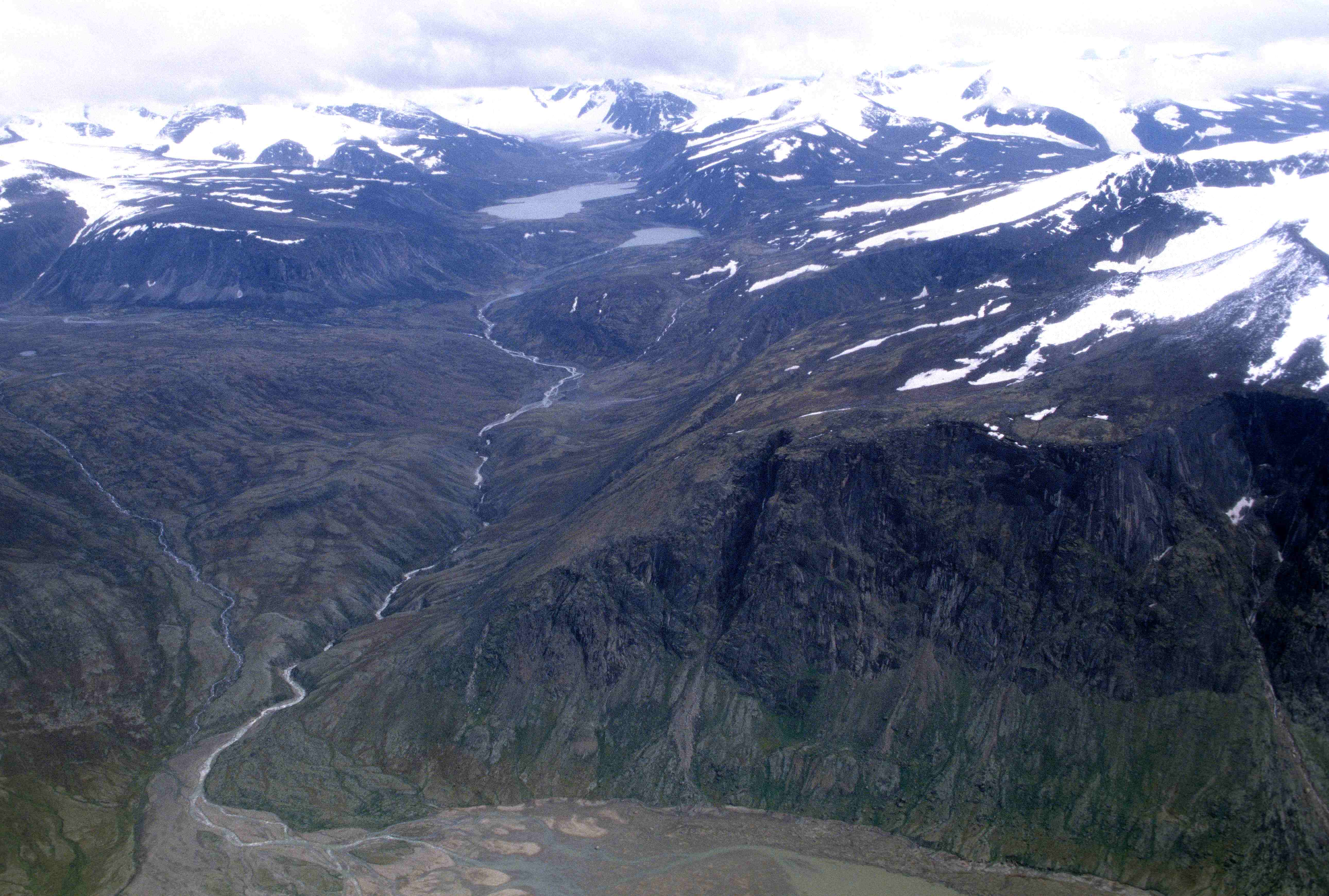
Baffin Mountains in Auyuittuq National Park

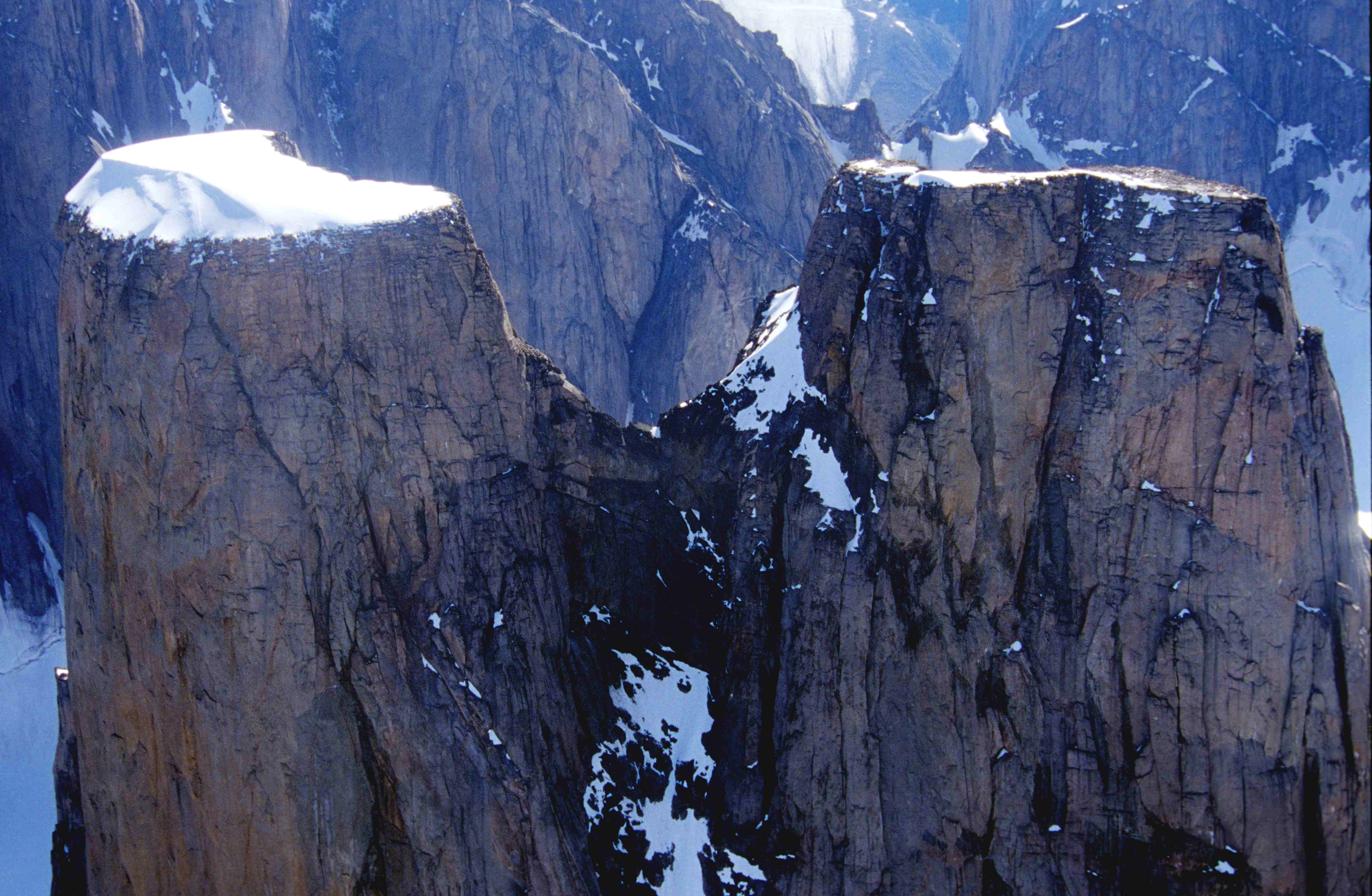
Mount Asgard

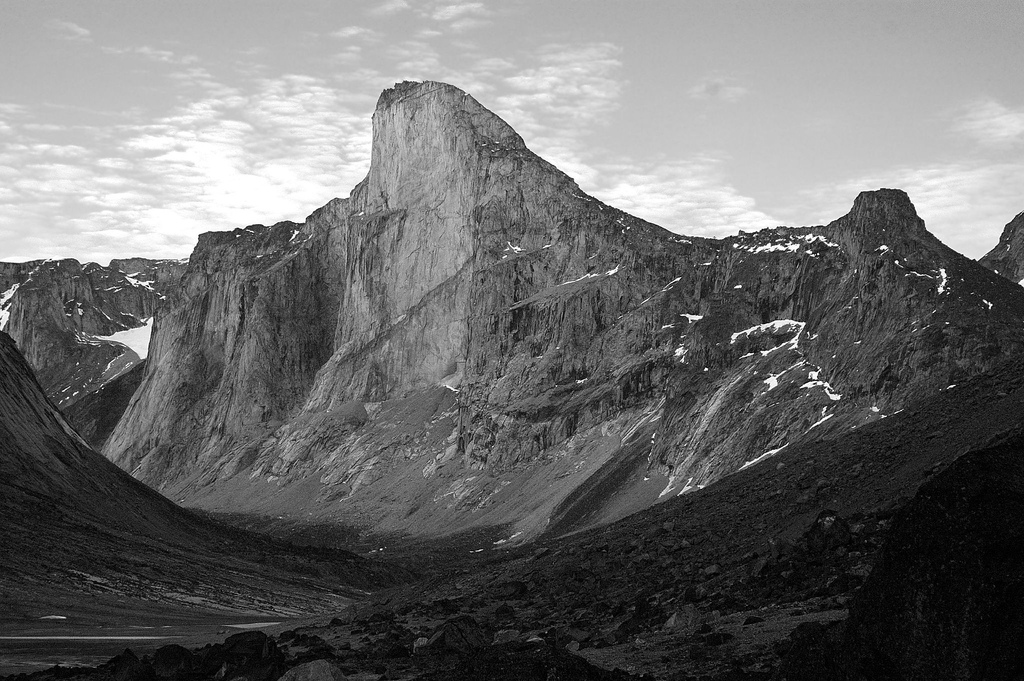
Mount Thor

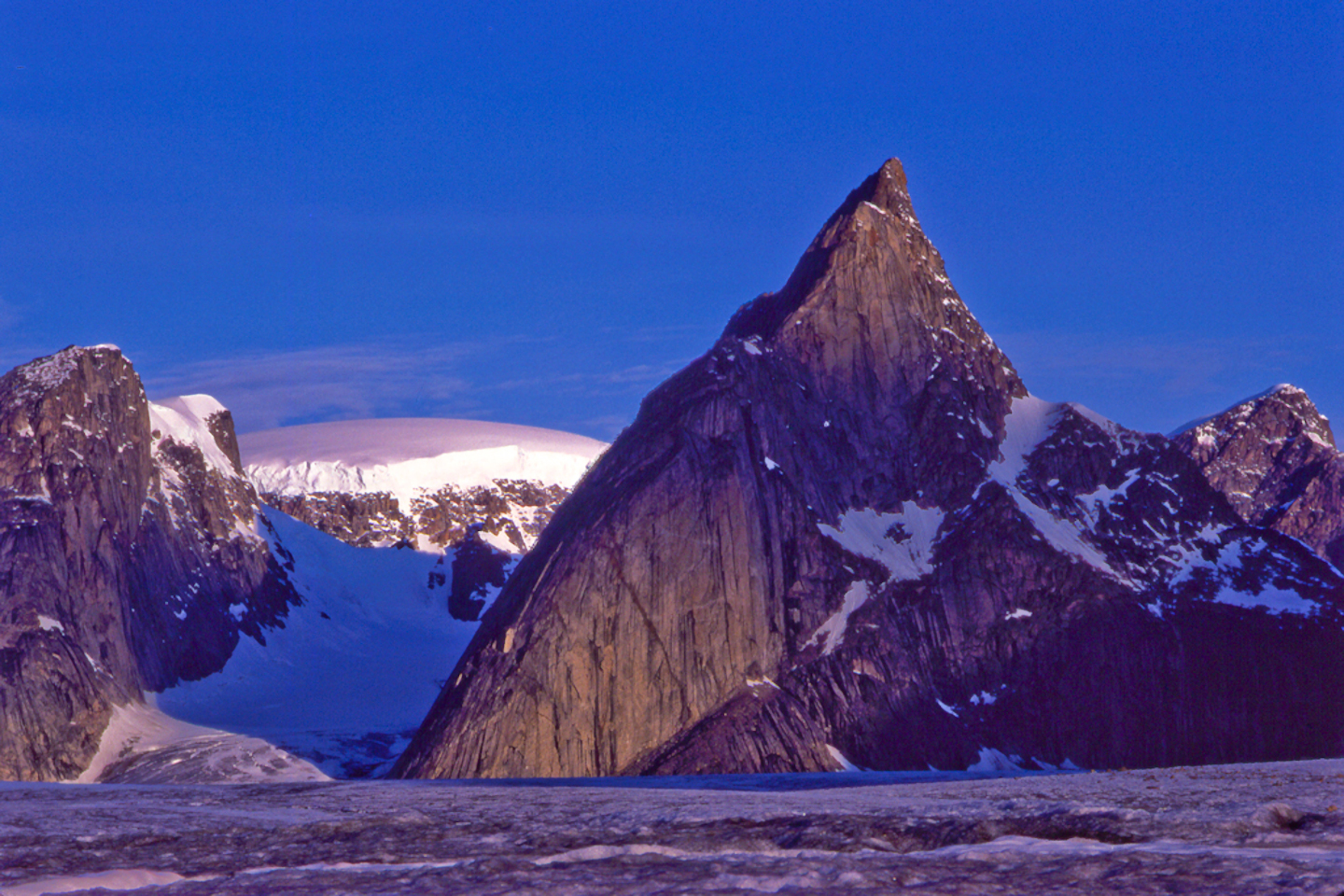
Mount Loki, Penny Icecap, Baffin Is.

Highest Peaks of the Baffin Mountains
Rank	Name	m	ft
1	Mount Odin	2147	7044
2	Mount Asgard	2015	6611
3	Qiajivik Mountain	1963	6440
4	Angilaaq Mountain	1951	6401
5	Kisimngiuqtuq Peak	1905	6250
6	Ukpik Peak	1809	5935
7	Bastille Peak	1733	5686
8	Mount Thule	1711	5614
9	Angna Mountain	1710	5610
10	Mount Thor	1675	5495

== Glaciation ==
The ranges of the Baffin Mountains are separated by deep fjords and glaciated valleys with many spectacular glacial and ice-capped mountains. The snowfall in the Baffin Mountains is light, much less than in places like the Saint Elias Mountains in southeastern Alaska and southwestern Yukon which are plastered with snow.

The largest ice cap in the Baffin Mountains is the Penny Ice Cap, which has an area of 6,000 km^{2} (2,300 sq mi). During the mid-1990s, Canadian researchers studied the glacier's patterns of freezing and thawing over centuries by drilling ice core samples.

== Flora and fauna ==
The dominant vegetation in the Baffin Mountains is a discontinuous cover of mosses, lichens and cold-hardy vascular plants such as sedge and cottongrass.

== History ==
One of the first mountaineering expeditions in the Baffin Mountains was in 1934 by J.M Wordie, in which two peaks called Pioneer Peak and Longstaff Tower were climbed.

The Auyuittuq National Park was established in 1976. It features much Arctic wilderness, such as fjords, glaciers and ice fields. In Inuktitut – the language of Nunavut's Aboriginal people, Inuit – Auyuittuq means "the land that never melts". Although Auyuittuq was established in 1976 as a national park reserve, it was upgraded to a full national park in 2000.

There were Inuit settlements in the Baffin Mountains before European contact. The first European contact is believed to have been by Norse explorers in the 11th century, but the first recorded sighting of Baffin Island was made by Martin Frobisher during his search for the Northwest Passage in 1576.
