= List of protected areas of Nunavut =

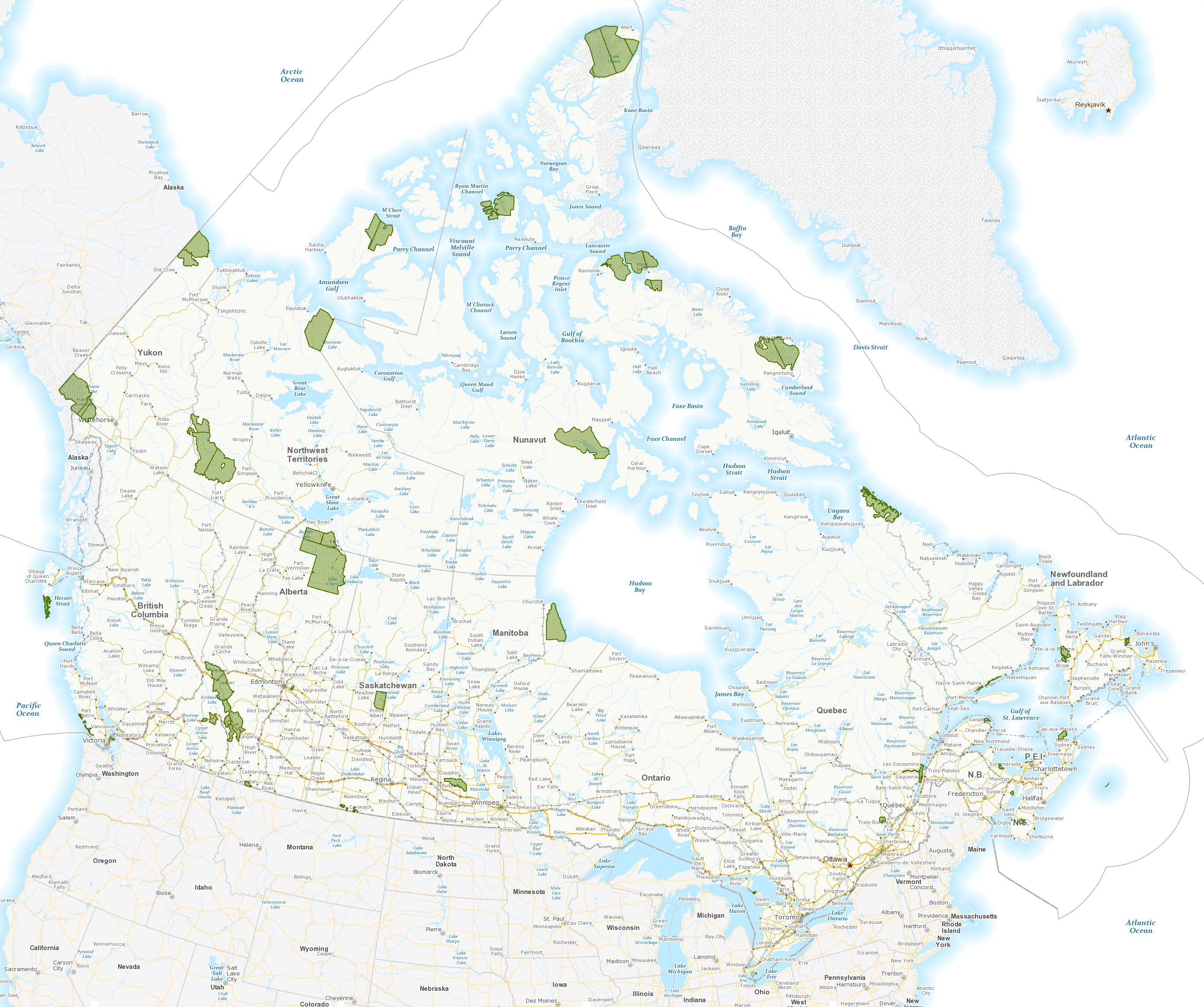
Canada's National Parks and National Reserves by provinces and territories

This is a list of protected areas of Nunavut in Canada.

== National parks ==
Name	Access point / community	Area	Coordinates	Image
Auyuittuq National Park	Pangnirtung / Qikiqtarjuaq	19,080 km^{2} (7,370 sq mi)	67°30′N 066°00′W	
Qausuittuq National Park	Resolute	11,000 km^{2} (4,200 sq mi)	72°07′27″N 100°01′52″W	
Quttinirpaaq National Park	Resolute	37,775 km^{2} (14,585 sq mi)	82°13′N 72°13′W	
Sirmilik National Park	Arctic Bay / Pond Inlet	22,200 km^{2} (8,600 sq mi)	72°50′N 080°35′W	
Ukkusiksalik National Park	Baker Lake / Chesterfield Inlet / Coral Harbour / Naujaat / Rankin Inlet	23,088 km^{2} (8,914 sq mi)	65°29′55″N 88°53′43″W	

== Territorial parks ==
=== Kitikmeot Region ===
Name	Community	Commons category	Picture	Coordinates
Kugluk/Bloody Falls Territorial Park	Kugluktuk	Kugluk/Bloody Falls Territorial Park		67°44′N 115°22′W
Ovayok Territorial Park	Cambridge Bay	Ovayok Territorial Park		69°10′N 104°43′W

=== Kivalliq Region ===
Name	Community	Commons category	Picture	Coordinates
Inuujaarvik Territorial Park	Baker Lake			64°19′N 96°05′W
Iqalugaarjuup Nunanga Territorial Park	Rankin Inlet	Iqalugaarjuup Nunanga Territorial Park		62°53′N 92°10′W

=== Qikiqtaaluk Region ===
Name	Community	Commons category	Picture	Coordinates
Agguttinni Territorial Park	Clyde River			
Katannilik Territorial Park	Kimmirut	Katannilik Territorial Park		62°54′N 69°51′W
Kingngaaluk Territorial Park	Sanikiluaq			
Malijuaq Territorial Park	Kinngait			64°14′N 76°37′W
Pisuktinu Tunngavik Territorial Park	Pangnirtung			66°09′N 65°41′W
Qaummaarviit Territorial Park	Iqaluit	Qaummaarviit Territorial Park		63°43′N 68°30′W
Qikiqtan Territorial Park (Kekerten)	Pangnirtung			65°42′N 65°49′W
Sylvia Grinnell Territorial Park (Iqaluit Kuunga)	Iqaluit	Sylvia Grinnell Territorial Park		63°46′N 69°39′W
Tamaarvik Territorial Park	Pond Inlet			72°42′N 77°57′W
Taqaiqsirvik Territorial Park	Kimmirut			62°52′N 69°54′W
Tupirvik Territorial Park	Resolute			74°45′N 95°03′W

== Migratory bird sanctuaries ==
Name	Location	Area		Picture	Coordinates
Name	Location	ha	acre	Picture	Coordinates
Ahiak Migratory Bird Sanctuary (Queen Maud Gulf)	Queen Maud Gulf / Cambridge Bay / Gjoa Haven / Umingmaktok	6,292,818	15,549,890		67°00′N 100°30′W
Akimiski Island Migratory Bird Sanctuary	Akimiski Island	353,421	873,320		52°02′N 81°15′W
Akpaqarvik Migratory Bird Sanctuary (Prince Leopold Island)	Prince Leopold Island / Resolute	30,399	75,120		74°02′N 90°00′W
Bylot Island Migratory Bird Sanctuary	Bylot Island / Pond Inlet	1,282,731	3,169,700		73°13′N 78°34′W
Ikkattuaq Migratory Bird Sanctuary (Harry Gibbons)	Southampton Island / Coral Harbour	143,811	355,360		63°45′N 85°40′W
Isulijarniq Migratory Bird Sanctuary (Dewey Soper)	Baffin Island / Kinngait	816,599	2,017,860		66°35′N 71°30′W
Kuugaarjuk Migratory Bird Sanctuary (McConnell River)	McConnell River / Arviat	36,803	90,940		60°50′N 94°20′W
Naujavaat (Seymour Island) Migratory Bird Sanctuary	Seymour Island / Resolute	5,302	13,100		76°48′N 101°16′W
Qaqsauqtuuq Migratory Bird Sanctuary (East Bay)	Southampton Island / Coral Harbour	112,826	278,800		64°00′N 82°00′W

== Other ==
Name	Type	Access point / community	Area	Coordinates	Image
Akpait National Wildlife Area (Reid Bay)	National Wildlife Area	Qikiqtarjuaq	774 km^{2} (299 sq mi)	66°56′N 061°46′W	
Arvia'juaq and Qikiqtaarjuk National Historic Site				61°08′N 93°59′W	
Boatswain Bay Migratory Bird Sanctuary	Bird sanctuary	Waskaganish, Quebec	179 km^{2} (69 sq mi)	51°50′N 078°52′W	
Bowman Bay Wildlife Sanctuary	Wildlife refuge	Cape Dorset	1,079 km^{2} (417 sq mi)	65°42′N 073°29′W	
Northwest Passage Trail				68°38′N 95°53′W	
Niginganiq National Wildlife Area (Isabella Bay). Specialized sanctuary for bowhead whales.	National Wildlife Area	Clyde River	3,362 km^{2} (1,298 sq mi)	69°35′N 68°00′W	
Nirjutiqavvik National Wildlife Area (Coburg Island National Wildlife Area)	National Wildlife Area	Grise Fiord	1,650 km^{2} (640 sq mi)	75°57′N 079°18′W	
Polar Bear Pass National Wildlife Area	National Wildlife Area	Resolute	2,675 km^{2} (1,033 sq mi)	75°42′N 098°51′W	
Qaqulluit National Wildlife Area (Cape Searle)	National Wildlife Area	Qikiqtarjuaq	398 km^{2} (154 sq mi)	67°14′N 062°28′W	
Thelon Wildlife Sanctuary	Wildlife refuge	Baker Lake	52,000 km^{2} (20,000 sq mi)	64°50′N 102°10′W	
Twin Islands Wildlife Sanctuary	Wildlife refuge	Chisasibi, Quebec	301 km^{2} (116 sq mi)	53°10′N 079°55′W	

== See also ==
- List of Canadian protected areas
