= Qaqulluit =

Island in Nunavut, Canada

- Location within Nunavut Location within Canada

Geography
- Location: Davis Strait
- Coordinates: 67°12′37″N 62°32′55″W
- Archipelago: Arctic Archipelago

Administration
- Canada
- Nunavut: Nunavut
- Region: Qikiqtaaluk

Demographics
- Population: Uninhabited

Qaqulluit (Inuktitut syllabics: ᖃᖁᓪᓗᐃᑦ formerly Qaqaluit Island (meaning: "northern fulmar") is one of eastern Baffin Island's small, offshore, uninhabited islands, located in the Arctic Archipelago in the Qikiqtaaluk Region, Nunavut. Along with Paallavvik and Aggijjat, it is situated off Cumberland Peninsula within Davis Strait's Merchants Bay.

== Geography ==
Its characteristics include coastal cliffs and rocky shores.

== Fauna ==
Harp seal, polar bear, and walrus frequent the area.

== Conservation ==
The newly created Qaqulluit National Wildlife Area extends beyond the island to also include the Reid Bay Important Bird Area on Baffin Island.

Located on the island's northeastern tip, Nuvuttiq is another a Canadian Important Bird Area, an International Biological Program site and a Key Terrestrial Bird Habitat site.
