= Broughton Island (Nunavut) =

Island in the Arctic Archipelago

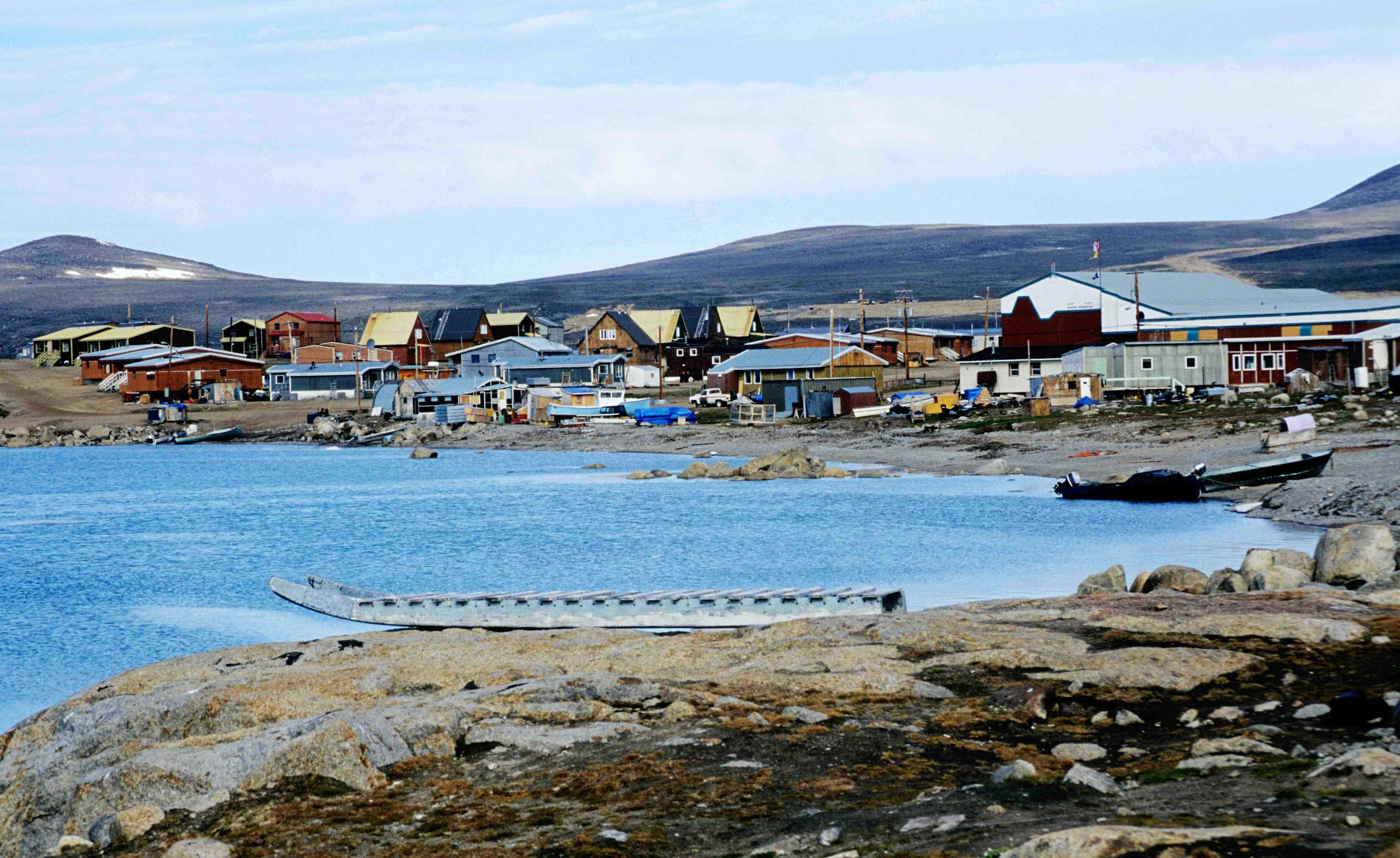
- Qikiqtarjuaq, 24 July 2001

- Location within Nunavut Location within Canada

Geography
- Location: Coast of the Cumberland Peninsula, Baffin Island
- Coordinates: 67°34′N 063°54′W
- Archipelago: Arctic Archipelago
- Area: 127.6 km^{2} (49.3 sq mi)

Administration
- Canada
- Territory: Nunavut
- Region: Qikiqtaaluk
- Largest settlement: Qikiqtarjuaq (pop. 593)

Demographics
- Population: 593 (2021)
- Ethnic groups: Inuit

Broughton Island is a 127.6 km^{2} (49.3 sq mi) island in the Arctic Archipelago.

== Geography ==
It is located above the Arctic Circle in the Davis Strait, off Baffin Island about 2 km (1.2 mi) west of the Cumberland Peninsula. To the east Baffin Bay, and the Baffin Mountains are located to the west, more specifically the Arctic Cordillera mountain range.

== Demographics ==
The only community on the island is Qikiqtarjuaq with a population of 593. It is one of only eleven islands, out of more than 36,000, in the Arctic Archipelago that are inhabited. The Inuit residents of Qikiqtarjuaq moved there in 1963 from a whaling station at Kivitoo about 50 km (31 mi) north.

Qikiqtarjuaq hosts an annual "Suicide Prevention Walk". Local participants would walk a total distance of 60 km (37 mi) across the tundra from Kivitoo. Today the walk is much shorter than the original two and a half days, but it is still meant to promote hope among the community.

The island was the home of FOX-5, a Distant Early Warning Line and now a North Warning System site.

There is also an access road that was built to Tisunaaq, also known as Ceetee Land to the Elders, and another road is in construction to Qikiqtarjuaqruluk, or Old Broughton, an abandoned settlement.

== Wildlife ==
The island is known for Arctic wildlife including ring seals, polar bears, bowhead whales, narwhals, and bird watching. The Qaqulluit National Wildlife Area is located about 55 km (34 mi) south east at 67°14′N 62°28′W. It serves as the northern access point for Auyuittuq National Park (see also Pangnirtung) and is approximately 2 hours by boat in the summer months, 2 - 2.5 hours by vehicle or snowmobile in winter months. All park visitors must register and book an orientation session prior to entry into the park, and non-Inuit who visit Auyuittuq must do so by hiring a local licensed operator.

== Gallery ==
Broughton Island and Qikiqtarjuaq
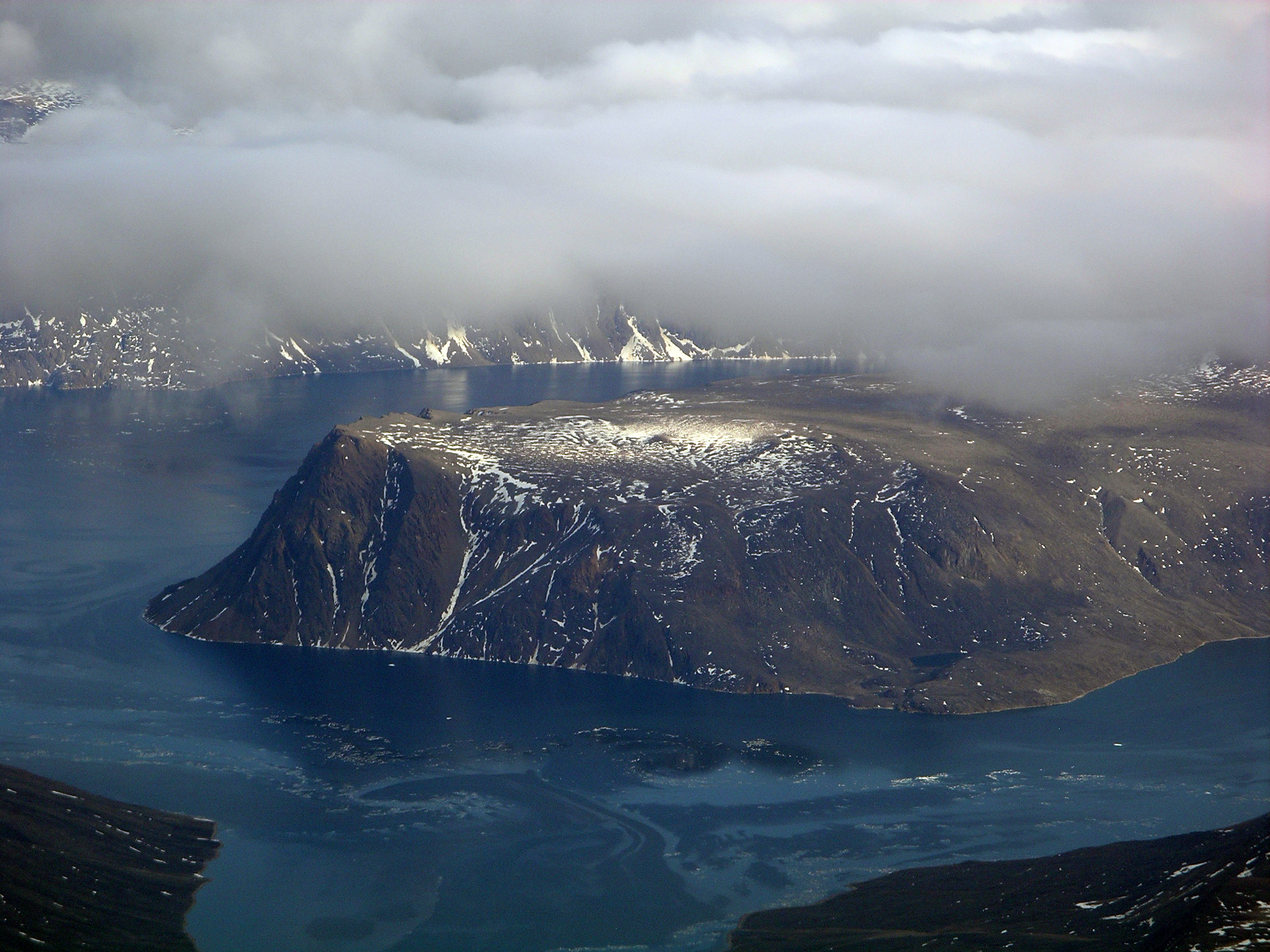
Some of the views around Qikiqtarjuaq (12 July 2011)

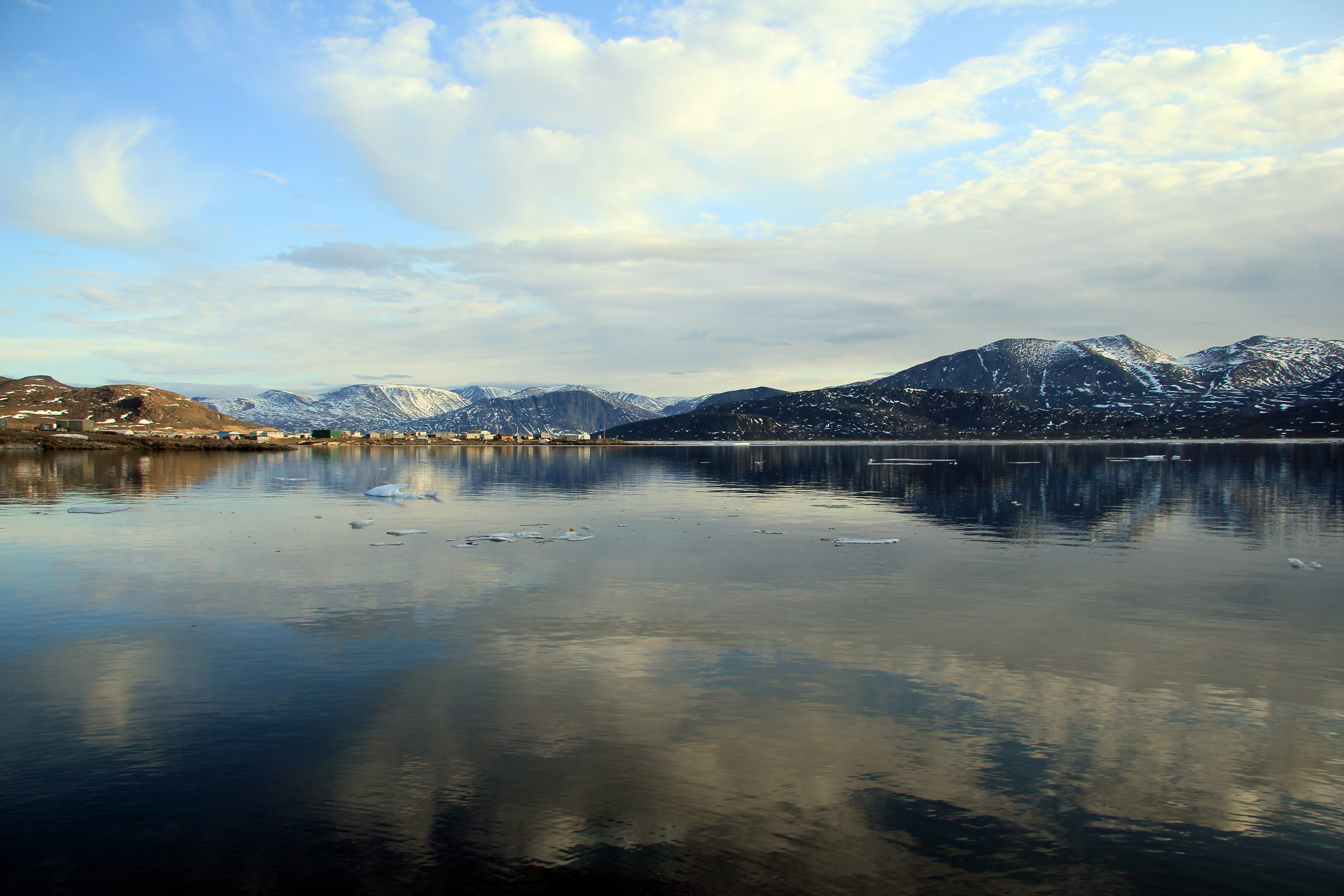
Summer in the Arctic at Broughton Island (12 July 2011)

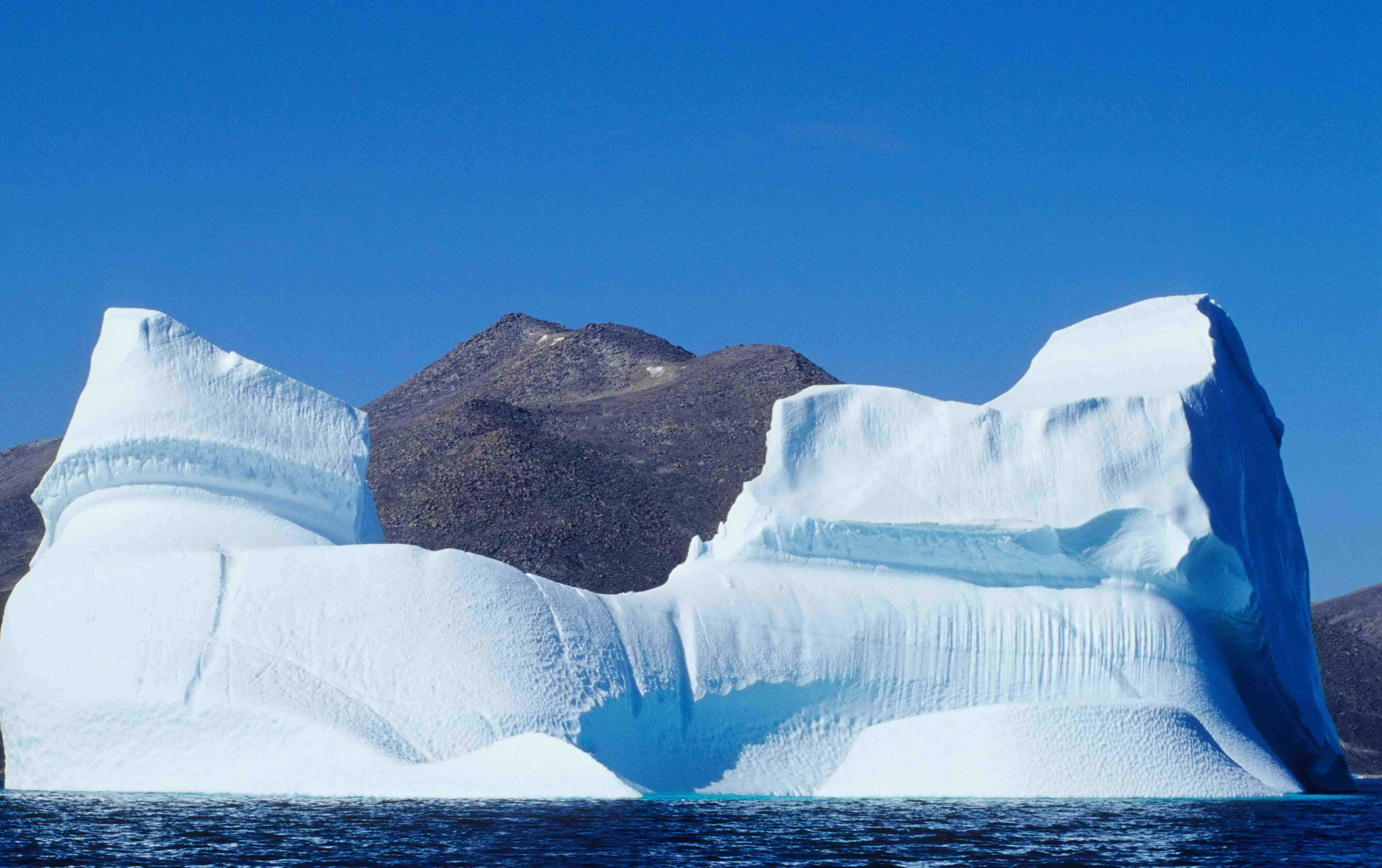
Iceberg near Qikiqtarjuaq (Davis Strait, 12 August 2000)

== Climate ==
Broughton Island has a tundra climate (ET), with the warmest month averaging below 6 °C (43 °F). Summers tend to be cool with chilly nights, while winters are long and cold. Early winter is the snowiest time of the year, with more than half of all year snowfall on average falling during this period.

Climate data for Qikiqtarjuaq (Qikiqtarjuaq Airport / AWOS) WMO ID: 71338; coordinates 67°32′45″N 64°01′53″W; elevation: 5.5 m (18 ft); 1991–2020 normals (Note: Climate data 1991–2020 is a composite recorded at Qikiqtarjuaq Climate (WMO ID: 71357; coordinates 67°32′51″N 64°02′00″W; elevation: 6.4 m (21 ft)), and Qikiqtarjuaq Airport (Climate ID: 2400577; coordinates 67°32′48″N 64°01′54″W; elevation: 5.5 m (18 ft)))
Month	Jan	Feb	Mar	Apr	May	Jun	Jul	Aug	Sep	Oct	Nov	Dec	Year
Record high humidex	−3.5	−5.9	1.7	6.1	9.0	17.9	23.8	21.5	16.6	11.3	4.7	6.2	23.8
Record high °C (°F)	−2.2 (28.0)	−3.0 (26.6)	2.2 (36.0)	6.8 (44.2)	9.2 (48.6)	17.4 (63.3)	23.8 (74.8)	24.0 (75.2)	15.6 (60.1)	11.5 (52.7)	6.8 (44.2)	6.9 (44.4)	24.0 (75.2)
Mean daily maximum °C (°F)	−22.1 (−7.8)	−23.7 (−10.7)	−19.9 (−3.8)	−11.3 (11.7)	−2.1 (28.2)	4.1 (39.4)	8.3 (46.9)	7.8 (46.0)	4.0 (39.2)	−1.0 (30.2)	−7.5 (18.5)	−16.3 (2.7)	−6.6 (20.1)
Daily mean °C (°F)	−26.6 (−15.9)	−28.1 (−18.6)	−24.6 (−12.3)	−16.6 (2.1)	−5.8 (21.6)	1.5 (34.7)	4.9 (40.8)	5.2 (41.4)	2.0 (35.6)	−3.9 (25.0)	−11.0 (12.2)	−20.5 (−4.9)	−10.3 (13.5)
Mean daily minimum °C (°F)	−31.0 (−23.8)	−32.5 (−26.5)	−29.4 (−20.9)	−21.7 (−7.1)	−9.4 (15.1)	−1.1 (30.0)	1.5 (34.7)	2.5 (36.5)	0.0 (32.0)	−6.7 (19.9)	−14.4 (6.1)	−24.5 (−12.1)	−13.9 (7.0)
Record low °C (°F)	−48.5 (−55.3)	−47.1 (−52.8)	−47.5 (−53.5)	−39.5 (−39.1)	−29.0 (−20.2)	−13.0 (8.6)	−4.0 (24.8)	−5.0 (23.0)	−11.5 (11.3)	−21.0 (−5.8)	−31.5 (−24.7)	−41.5 (−42.7)	−48.5 (−55.3)
Record low wind chill	−56.4	−55.1	−57.0	−45.4	−32.6	−12.9	−8.9	−7.2	−14.0	−22.8	−42.7	−51.6	−57.0
Average precipitation mm (inches)	6.8 (0.27)	6.8 (0.27)	5.7 (0.22)	16.0 (0.63)	31.8 (1.25)	18.6 (0.73)	26.8 (1.06)	26.1 (1.03)	32.9 (1.30)	46.1 (1.81)	37.1 (1.46)	7.3 (0.29)	262.0 (10.31)
Average rainfall mm (inches)	0.0 (0.0)	0.0 (0.0)	0.0 (0.0)	0.0 (0.0)	0.4 (0.02)	3.4 (0.13)	16.3 (0.64)	15.9 (0.63)	2.9 (0.11)	0.3 (0.01)	0.0 (0.0)	0.0 (0.0)	39.2 (1.54)
Average snowfall cm (inches)	6.8 (2.7)	6.8 (2.7)	5.7 (2.2)	16.0 (6.3)	31.4 (12.4)	15.2 (6.0)	10.5 (4.1)	10.2 (4.0)	30.0 (11.8)	45.8 (18.0)	37.1 (14.6)	7.3 (2.9)	222.8 (87.7)
Average extreme snow depth cm (inches)	48.0 (18.9)	51.0 (20.1)	56.0 (22.0)	60.0 (23.6)	53.0 (20.9)	7.0 (2.8)	0.0 (0.0)	0.0 (0.0)	1.0 (0.4)	14.0 (5.5)	28.0 (11.0)	43.0 (16.9)	30.0 (11.8)
Average precipitation days (≥ 0.2 mm)	4.0	3.5	3.2	6.2	9.1	5.8	7.7	8.3	9.5	13.7	9.5	4.3	84.7
Average rainy days (≥ 0.2 mm)	0.0	0.0	0.0	0.0	0.05	0.95	5.5	5.6	0.84	0.21	0.0	0.0	13.1
Average snowy days (≥ 0.2 cm)	4.0	3.5	3.2	6.2	9.1	4.9	2.9	3.5	8.6	13.6	9.5	4.3	73.2
Average relative humidity (%) (at 1500 LST)	71.2	70.8	69.8	75.2	82.3	85.2	82.5	84.2	79.2	78.1	76.7	75.0	77.5
Source: Environment and Climate Change Canada Canadian Climate Normals 1991–2020 (Precipitation, including precipitation days, from Broughton Island, Canadian Climate Normals 1971-2000 Station Data)
