= Boatswain Bay =

Bay in Nunavut, Canada

- Location within Nunavut
- Location: Eastward from James Bay
- Coordinates: 51°51′02″N 078°54′36″W
- Ocean/sea sources: Arctic Ocean
- Basin countries: Canada
- Surface area: 197 km^{2} (76 sq mi)
- Settlements: Uninhabited

Boatswain Bay (French: Baie Boatswain) is an uninhabited waterway in the Qikiqtaaluk Region of Nunavut, Canada. It extends eastward from James Bay into the headland, a part of Quebec.

== Geography ==
Characterized by salt marshes, brackish marshes, open sea, and inlet habitats, the bay stretches 197 km^{2} (76 sq mi), with an elevation ranging up to 5 m (16 ft) above sea level.

== Fauna ==
Due to the number of migratory birds the Boatswain Bay Migratory Bird Sanctuary was established in 1941. As a bird sanctuary it is a Canadian Important Bird Area (#NU097), a Biodiversity Reserve, and a Key Migratory Bird Terrestrial Habitat site.
