= Boatswain Bay Migratory Bird Sanctuary =

Migratory bird sanctuary in Quebec and Nunavut, Canada

- IUCN category Ia (strict nature reserve)
- Interactive map of Boatswain Bay Migratory Bird Sanctuary
- Location: James Bay, within Quebec and Nunavut, Canada
- Coordinates: 51°50′00″N 78°52′00″W
- Area: 16,289.4 ha (40,252 acres)
- Established: 1941
- Governing body: Landowners: Nunavut (water), Ministère des Richesses naturelles du Québec (land)

The Boatswain Bay Migratory Bird Sanctuary (variant: Baie Boatswain Migratory Bird Sanctuary) is a migratory bird sanctuary that extends between Nunavut and Quebec, Canada. It is located in Boatswain Bay an arm of James Bay, and the Quebec headland. It was established on 29 January 1941 and consists of 17,900 hectares It was established in 1941. It is classified Category IV by the International Union for Conservation of Nature.

The MBS spreads over 60 sq mi (160 km^{2}). Of the 16,289.4 hectares, the land surface, governed by Quebec, totals 9,553 hectares, while the marine surface, governed by Nunavut, totals 6,736.4 hectares.

== Other designations ==
Boatswain Bay is a Canadian Important Bird Area (#NU097); the MBS is situated within the IBA. The bay is also classified as a Biodiversity Reserve, and a Key Migratory Bird Terrestrial Habitat site.

== Notable species ==
The predominant bird species include:

- American black duck
- Atlantic brant
- Canada goose
- Lesser snow goose
- Yellow rail
- LeConte's sparrow
