= East Pen Island =

Island in Canada

- Location within Nunavut Location within Canada

Geography
- Location: Hudson Bay
- Coordinates: 56°45′N 088°40′W
- Archipelago: Arctic Archipelago
- Highest elevation: 10 m (30 ft)

Administration
- Canada
- Territory: Nunavut
- Region: Kivalliq

Demographics
- Population: Uninhabited

East Pen Island, sometimes referred to shortly as Pen Island, is one of several uninhabited Canadian arctic islands in Nunavut, Canada located within southwestern Hudson Bay. It is part of the Pen Islands, though West Pen Island is more properly termed a spit, rather than an island. East Pen Island is situated off the shore of Ontario, a few kilometers southeast of Manitoba. The closest community is Fort Severn, Ontario.

== Fauna ==
East Pen is classified as an IBA site, protecting Hudsonian godwits, red knots, black scoters, snow geese, and common eiders.
