= Ahiak Migratory Bird Sanctuary =

Migratory bird sanctuary in Nunavut, Canada

- Queen Maud Gulf Migratory Bird Sanctuary
- IUCN category Ib (wilderness area)
- Location within Nunavut Location within Canada
- Location: Nunavut, Canada
- Nearest city: Bathurst Inlet
- Coordinates: 67°00′N 100°30′W
- Area: 6,292,818 ha (15,549,890 acres)
- Established: 1961
- Governing body: Environment and Climate Change Canada

Ramsar Wetland
- Official name: Queen Maud Gulf
- Designated: 24 May 1982
- Reference no.: 246

The Ahiak Migratory Bird Sanctuary, formerly the Queen Maud Gulf Migratory Bird Sanctuary, is Canada's largest federally owned protected area, encompassing some 6,292,818 ha (15,549,890 acres) of the Arctic Circle coastline and includes 655,334 ha (1,619,370 acres) that are marine.

Under the terms of the Ramsar Convention, it was designated as a wetland of international importance in 1982. It is the world's second-largest Ramsar Site. The majority of the park is Arctic Lowlands and countless streams, ponds and shallow lakes. The land is mainly Arctic tundra and marshes.

In 1982, 450,000 geese, including the majority of the world's Ross's geese, nested in the sanctuary, one of the largest concentration of geese on Earth.

The protected area was established in 1961 under the Migratory Bird Sanctuary Regulations of the federal Migratory Birds Convention Act of 1917. It was named for Queen Maud of Norway.

== Wildlife ==
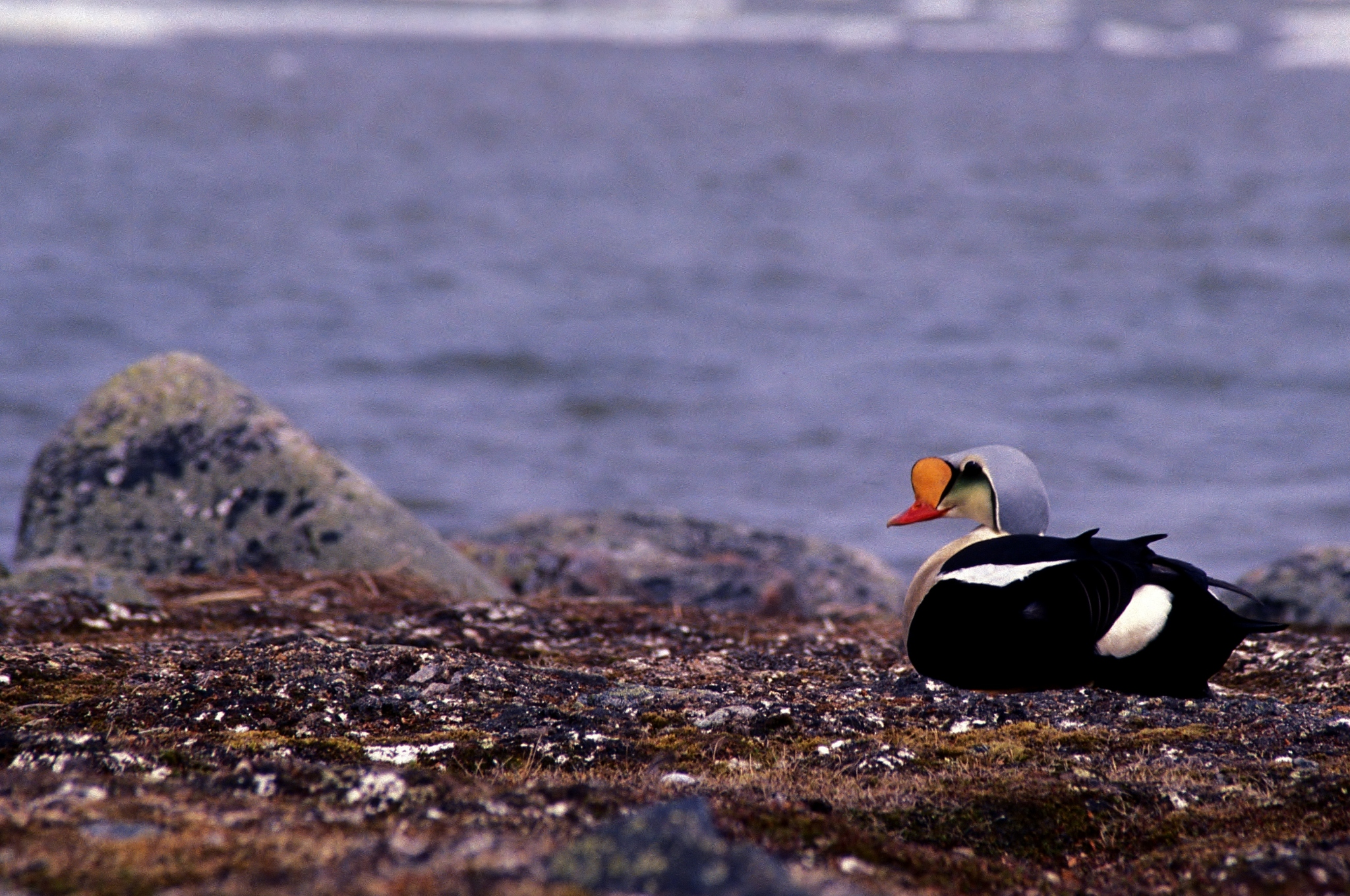
King eider on the sanctuary's flat tundra.

Over 2 million white geese nest within the sanctuary, including over 90% of the world's Ross's goose population and 8% of Canada's snow goose population. The geese arrive in late May to moult in lakes and rivers and remain until August or September. The sanctuary also holds smaller populations of Canada goose, greater white-fronted goose, brant, and tundra swan, as well as other migratory species of waterfowl and water birds.

The entirety of the sanctuary is used by barren-ground caribou. The Ahiak herds (estimated to be numbering around 71,000) spends its summers in the sanctuary, while the Beverly herd (numbering 103,000) gives birth to calves in the sanctuary. It also supports an estimated 6,000 muskoxen, including some rare "white muskoxen" which have been sighted in the sanctuary. Mammal populations of the sanctuary are controlled by large populations of Hudson Bay wolves, grizzly bears, red foxes, Arctic foxes and wolverines.

== See also ==
- List of Nunavut parks
- List of Ramsar wetlands of international importance
