= Akimiski Island =

Island in southern Hudson Bay

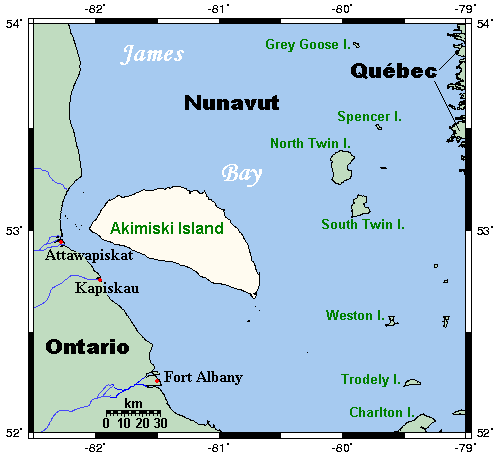
- Closeup of Akimiski Island

- Location within Nunavut Location within Canada

Geography
- Location: Nunavut
- Coordinates: 53°00′30″N 081°16′30″W
- Archipelago: Arctic Archipelago
- Area: 3,112.89 km^{2} (1,201.89 sq mi) (2026)
- Area rank: 29th in Canada & 161st worldwide
- Highest elevation: 34 m (112 ft)

Administration
- Canada
- Territory: Nunavut
- Region: Qikiqtaaluk

Demographics
- Population: Uninhabited

Akimiski Island is the largest island in James Bay (a southeasterly extension of Hudson Bay), Canada, which is part of the Qikiqtaaluk Region of the territory of Nunavut. It has an area of 3,112.89 km^{2} (1,201.89 sq mi), making it the 161st largest island in the world, and Canada's 29th largest island. Akimiski Island is 19 km (12 mi) from the province of Ontario. From the western side of the island, the Ontario coastline is visible. The island's name is Swampy Cree for "land across the water".

== Geography ==
The island is part of the traditional territories of the Attawapiskat First Nation, but has no year-round human inhabitants. The surface of Akimiski is flat and slopes gradually to the north. Most of the vegetation that covers the island consists of lichen, moss, sedges, and dwarf black spruce. The island is a coastal wetland that includes mudflats, tidal marshes, and tidal mudflats. Freshwater streams that flow into southwestern James Bay carry sediments and abundant nutrients that help to sustain the productive waterfowl habitat around Akimiski Island. The Akimiski Island Group includes Akimiski, Gasket, and Gullery islands; Albert Shoal; and the Akimiski Strait Isles.

== Toponymy ==
Akimiski island has few named geographical regions. Notable regions include:

- Cape Duncan, an area on the southeast corner of the island. It falls under the protection of the Akimiski Island Migratory Bird Sanctuary
- Houston Point, a cape on the northeastern coast of Akimiski Island
Akimiski Island
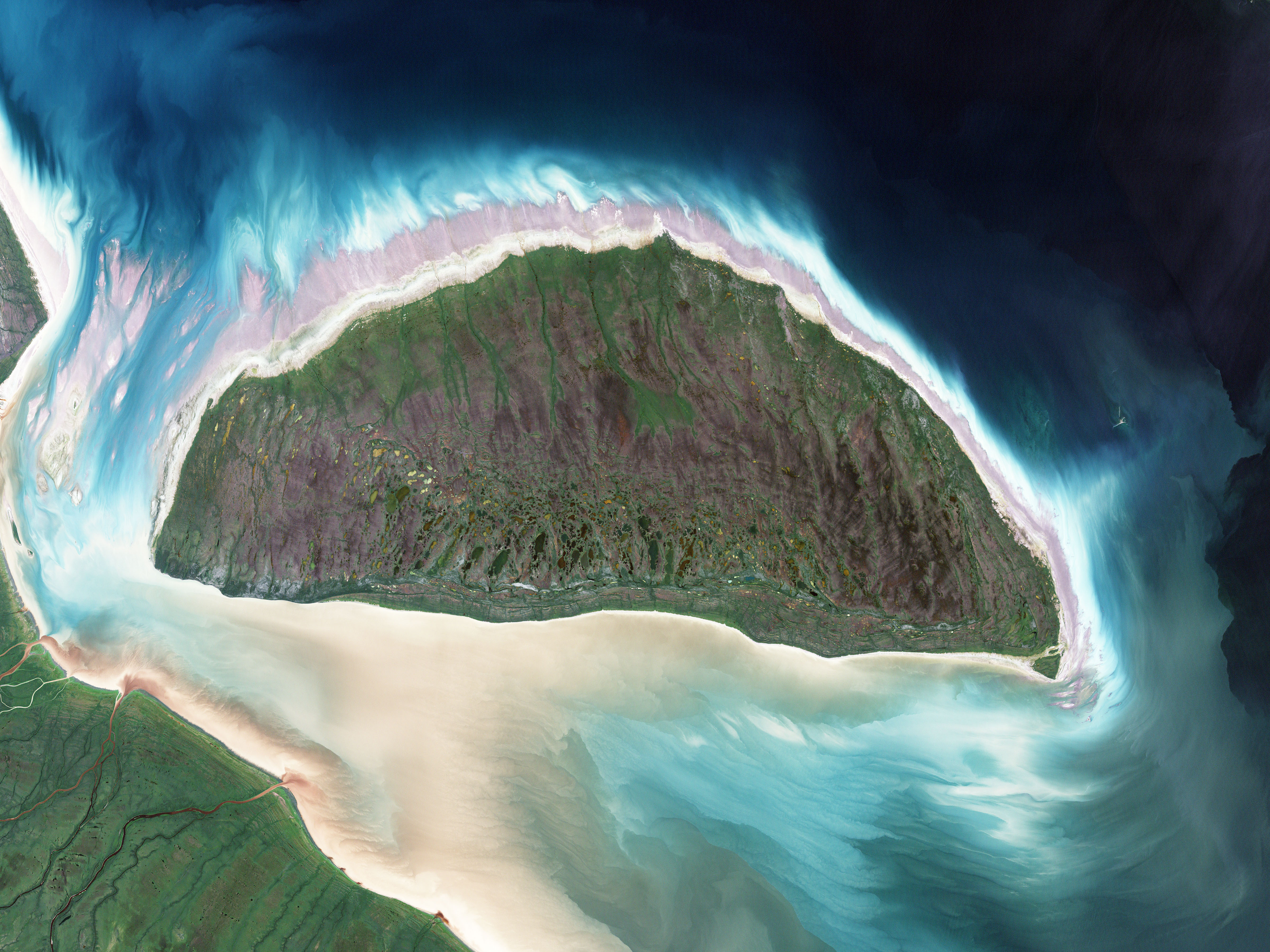
Landsat image of Akimiski Island

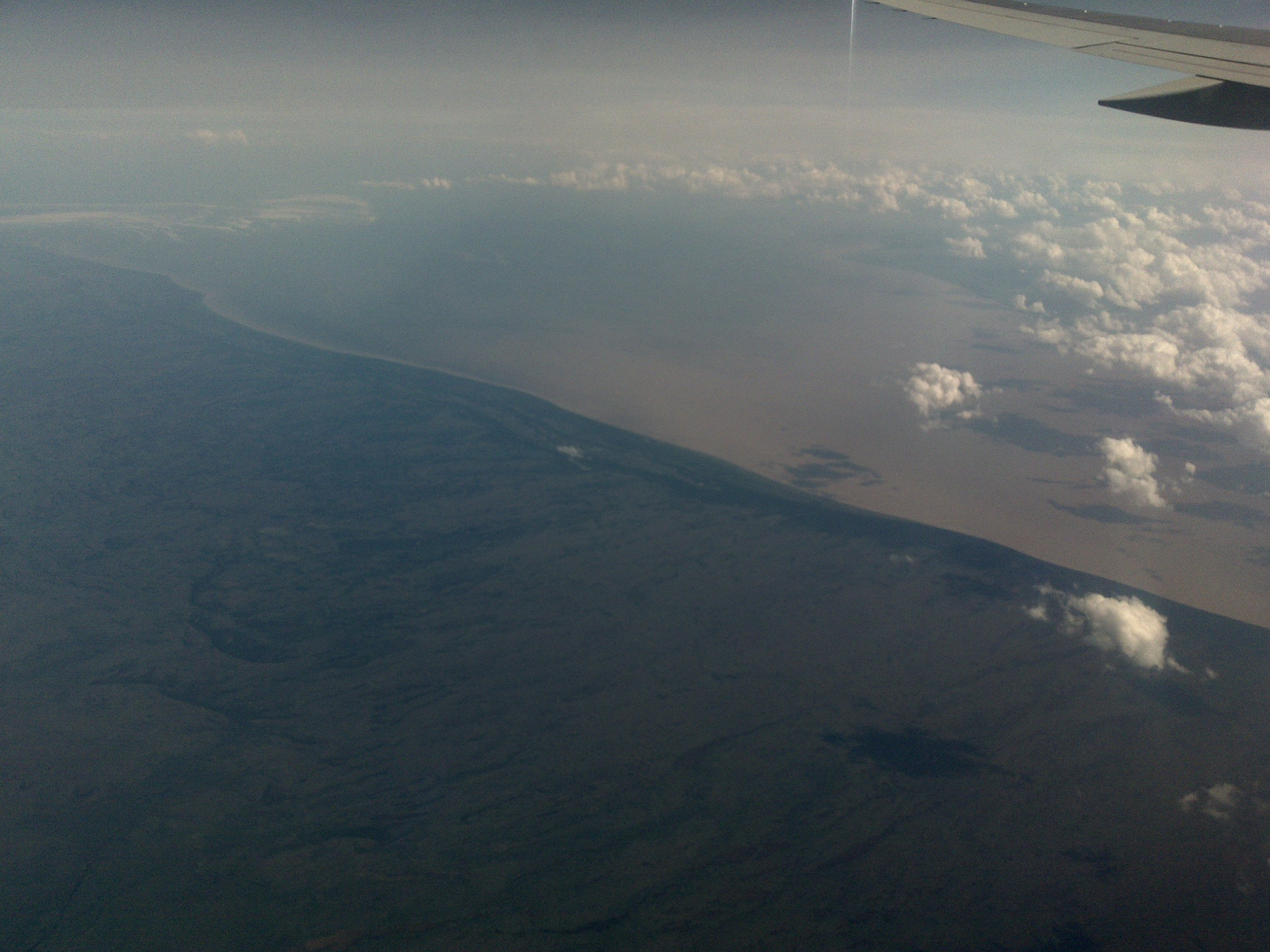
Photo of western coast, viewed from north towards south, in mid-July

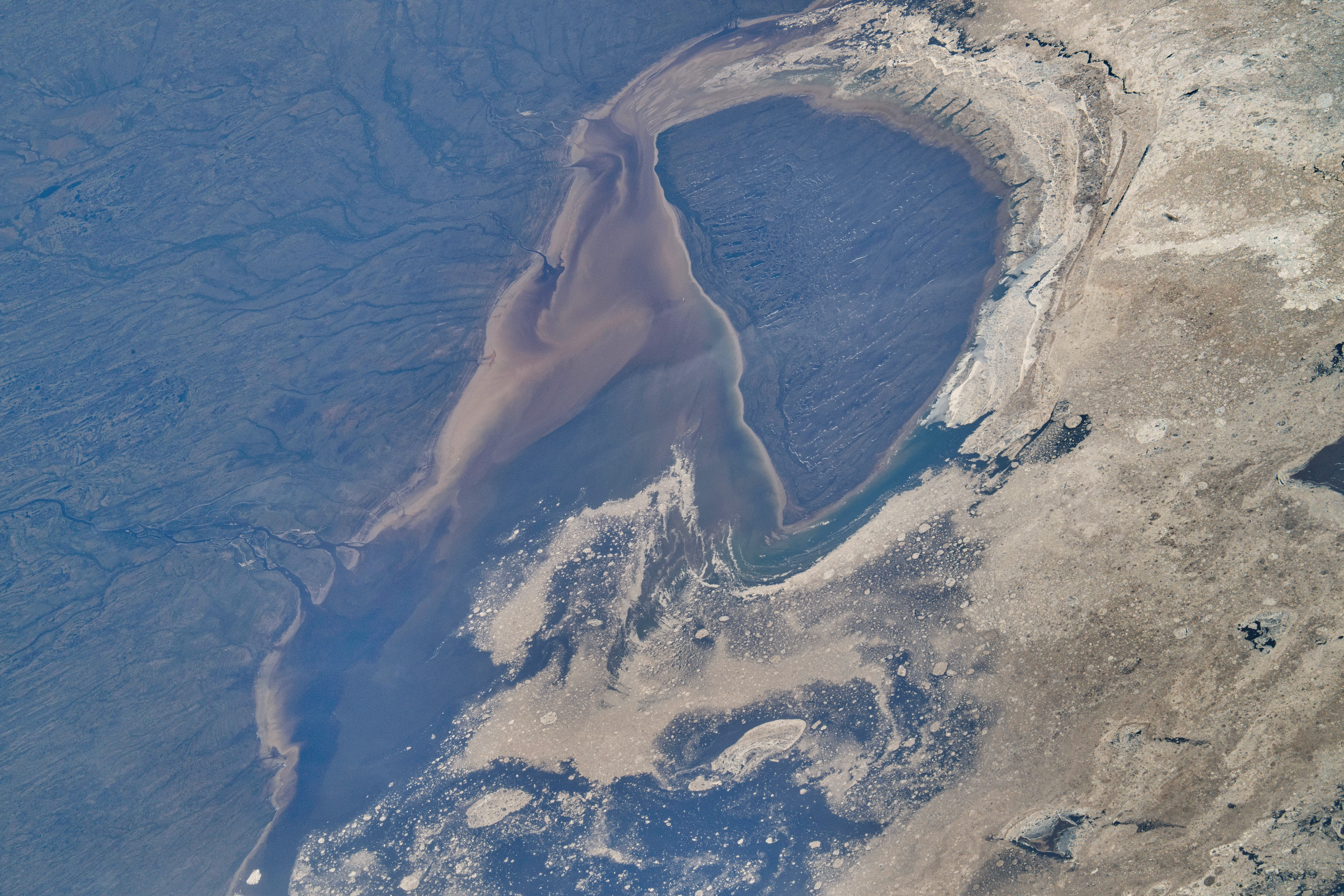

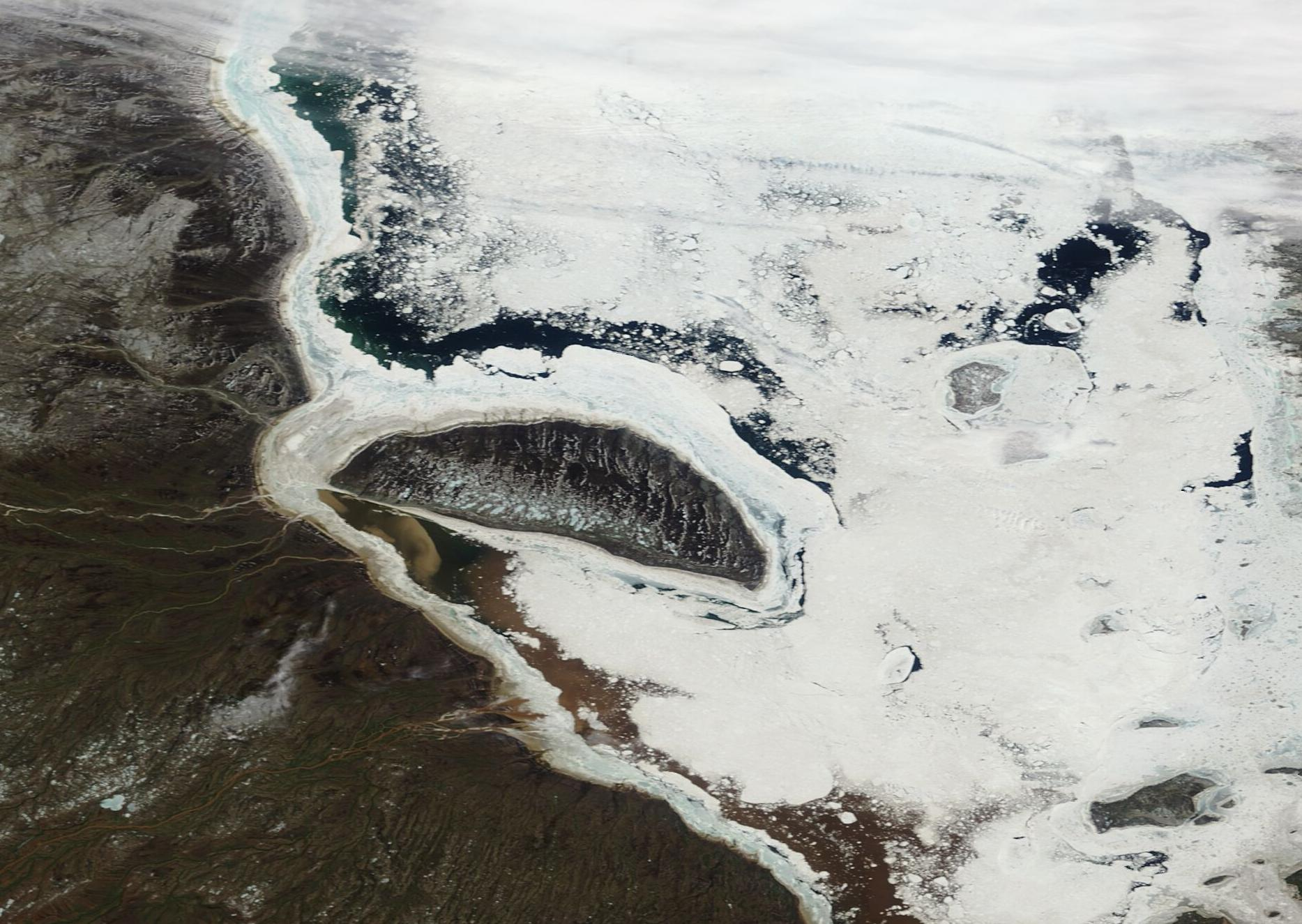
Thawing around Akimiski Island

== Climate ==
- Mean annual temperature: 2.5 °C (36.5 °F)
- Average rainfall: 450 mm (17.72 in)
- Average snowfall: 25 cm (9.84 in)

Climate data for Akimiski Island
Month	Jan	Feb	Mar	Apr	May	Jun	Jul	Aug	Sep	Oct	Nov	Dec	Year
Mean daily maximum °C (°F)	−14 (7)	−12 (10)	−6 (21)	1 (34)	10 (50)	17 (63)	19 (66)	19 (66)	13 (55)	6 (43)	−1 (30)	−9 (16)	4 (38)
Mean daily minimum °C (°F)	−23 (−9)	−22 (−8)	−16 (3)	−7 (19)	−1 (30)	3 (37)	6 (43)	8 (46)	5 (41)	1 (34)	−6 (21)	−17 (1)	−6 (22)
Average precipitation mm (inches)	23 (0.9)	18 (0.7)	30 (1.2)	35 (1.4)	44 (1.7)	57 (2.2)	58 (2.3)	56 (2.2)	55 (2.2)	60 (2.4)	45 (1.8)	27 (1.1)	508 (20.1)

== Conservation ==
Akimiski Island is the site of the Akimiski Island Migratory Bird Sanctuary, a Canadian Important Bird Area, site #NU036 (53°10′12″N 081°19′48″W). Its eastern portion is also a federal Migratory Bird Sanctuary, and much of the coastline is a Key Migratory Bird Terrestrial Habitat site.

== Fauna ==
The coastal waters and wetlands of Akimiski Island (and James Bay in general) are important feeding grounds for many varieties of migratory birds. Notable species include:

- Atlantic brant
- Canada goose
- Lesser snow goose
- Marbled godwit
- Semipalmated sandpiper

Because James Bay and Hudson Bay are funnel-shaped, migrating birds from the Arctic concentrate in this area. During fall migration, an abundance of birds with both adults and young are present. In the springtime, the birds tend to reside in the southern areas of James Bay until the northern section thaws. Among mammals, ringed seals, polar bears, and beluga whales can be found in the area.
