= Akimiski Island Migratory Bird Sanctuary =

Migratory bird sanctuary in Canada

- IUCN category Ib (wilderness area)
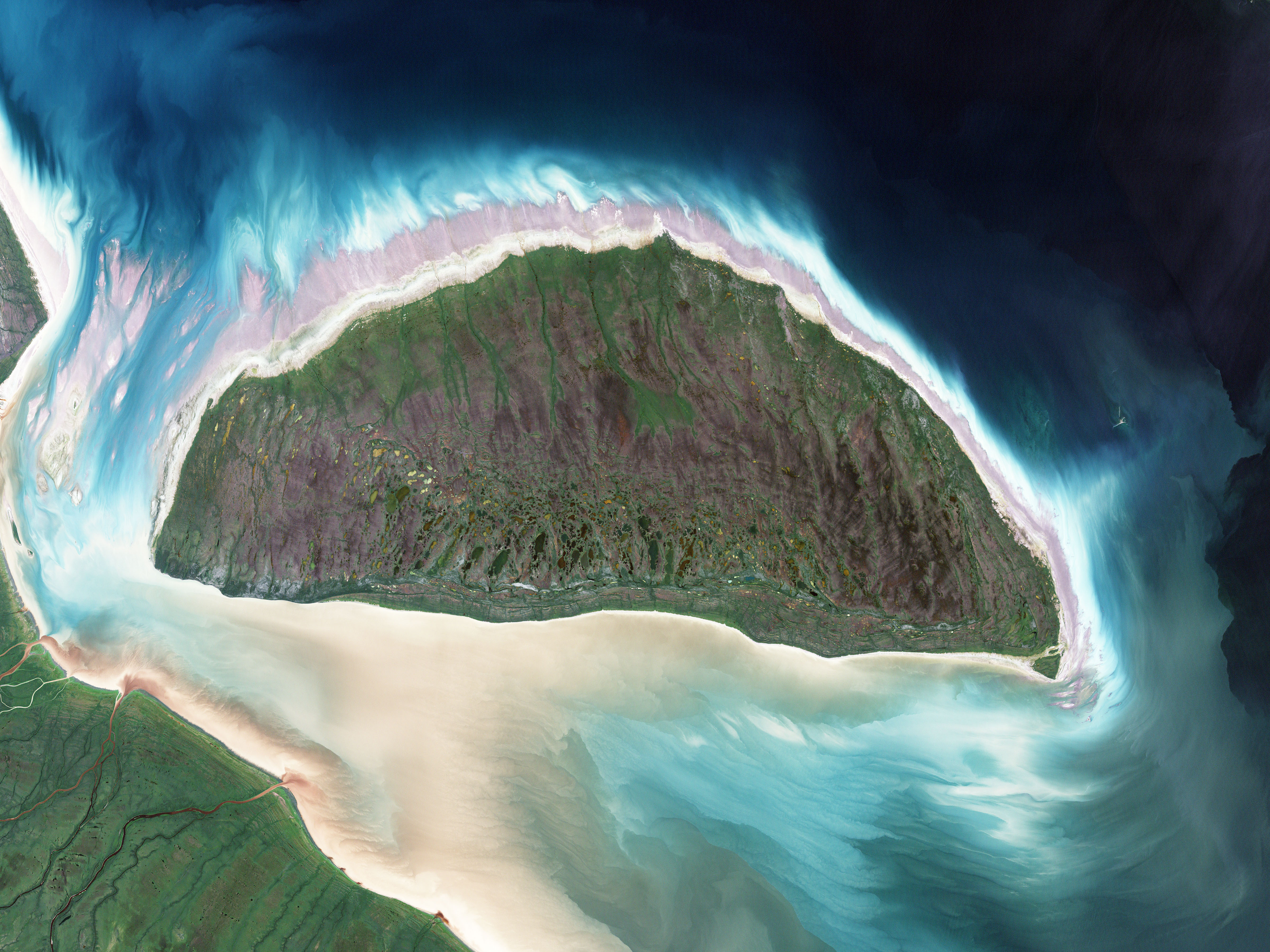
- Landsat image of Akimiski Island
- Interactive map of Akimiski Island Migratory Bird Sanctuary
- Location: James Bay, Qikiqtaaluk, Nunavut, Canada
- Coordinates: 52°57′32″N 81°06′34″W
- Area: 3,367 km^{2} (1,300 sq mi)
- Established: 1941
- Governing body: Canadian Wildlife Service

The Akimiski Island Migratory Bird Sanctuary is a migratory bird sanctuary in Qikiqtaaluk, Nunavut, Canada. It is located on Akimiski Island within James Bay. The sanctuary, established by the Canadian government on 1 January 1941, has federal conservation status. Taking up the eastern two-thirds of the island, it is 3,367 km^{2} (1,300 sq mi) in overall size, including a 1,664 km^{2} (642 sq mi) marine area. It includes marine, intertidal, and subtidal components, and is rated Category Ib by the International Union for Conservation of Nature.

The coastal waters and wetlands are important feeding grounds for several varieties of migratory waterfowl and shorebirds. These include Atlantic brant, Canada goose, Caspian tern, Hudsonian godwit, lesser snow goose, red knot, and semipalmated plover.

Among mammalians, ringed seals, polar bears, and beluga whales can be found in the area.

== Other designations ==
In addition to the migratory bird sanctuary designation, this area is an Important Bird Area, site #NU036. Most of the coastline has been designated as a key terrestrial habitat for migratory birds by the Canadian Wildlife Service.
