= Arctic Archipelago =

Canadian islands in the Arctic Ocean

Arctic Archipelago Archipel arctique canadien (Canadian French)
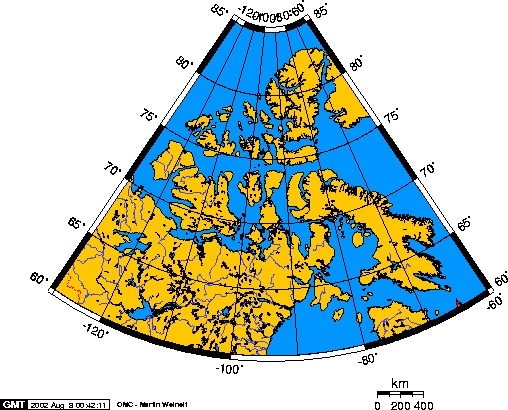
- Polar projection map of the Arctic Archipelago

Geography
- Location: Northern Canada
- Coordinates: 75°N 90°W
- Total islands: 36,563
- Major islands: Baffin Island, Victoria Island, Ellesmere Island
- Area: 1,407,770 km^{2} (543,540 sq mi)

Administration
- Canada
- Territories and province: Nunavut; Northwest Territories; Yukon; Newfoundland and Labrador
- Largest settlement: Iqaluit, Nunavut (pop. 7,429)

Demographics
- Population: 23,073 (2021)
- Pop. density: 0.0098/km^{2} (0.0254/sq mi)

The Arctic Archipelago, also known as the Canadian Arctic Archipelago, is an archipelago lying to the north of the Canadian continental mainland, excluding Greenland (an autonomous territory of the Danish Realm, which is, by itself, much larger than the combined area of the archipelago), and Iceland (an independent country).

Situated in the northern extremity of North America and covering about 1,424,500 km^{2} (550,000 sq mi), this group of 36,563 islands, surrounded by the Arctic Ocean, comprises much of Northern Canada, predominantly Nunavut and the Northwest Territories. The archipelago is showing some effects of climate change, with some computer estimates determining that melting there will contribute 3.5 cm (1.4 in) to the rise in sea levels by 2100.

== History ==
Around 2500 BCE, the Paleo-Eskimos arrived to the archipelago from the Canadian mainland, the first humans to do so. Between 1000 and 1500 CE, they were replaced by the Thule people, who are the ancestors of today's Inuit.

British claims on the islands, the British Arctic Territories, were based on the explorations in the 1570s by Martin Frobisher. Canadian sovereignty was originally (1870–80) only over island portions that drained into Foxe Basin, Hudson Bay and Hudson Strait. Canadian sovereignty over the islands was established by 1880 when Britain transferred them to Canada. The District of Franklin—established in 1895—comprised almost all of the archipelago. The district was dissolved upon the creation of Nunavut in 1999. Canada claims all the waterways of the Northwest Passage as Canadian Internal Waters; however, most maritime countries view these as international waters. Disagreement over the passages' status has raised Canadian concerns about environmental enforcement, national security, and general sovereignty. East of Ellesmere Island, in the Nares Strait, lies Hans Island, ownership of which is now shared between Canada and Denmark, after a decades-long dispute.

== Geography ==
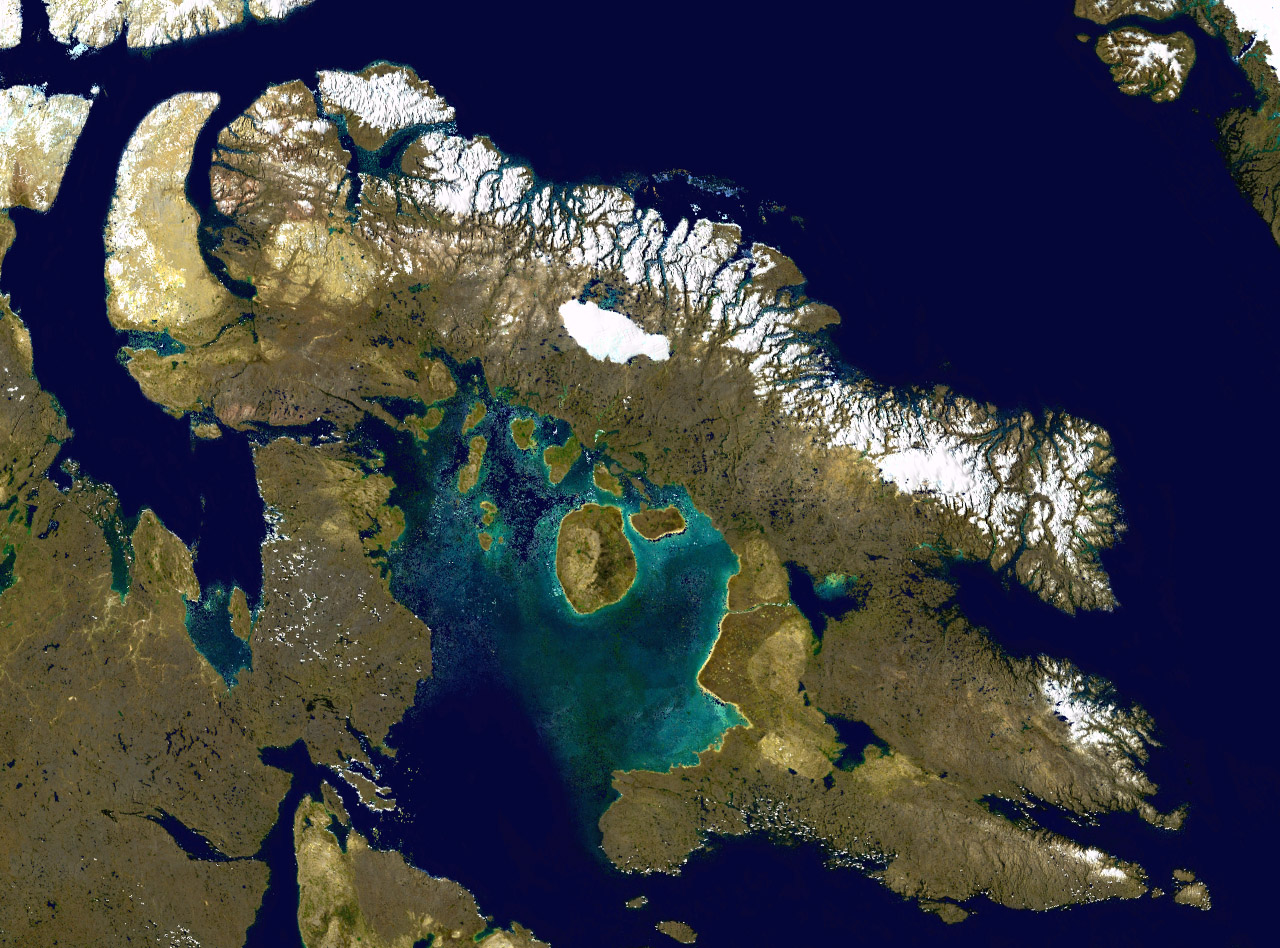
Satellite image of Baffin Island, the largest island by total area of the Arctic Archipelago

The archipelago extends some 2,400 km (1,500 mi) longitudinally and 1,900 km (1,200 mi) from the mainland to Cape Columbia, the northernmost point on Ellesmere Island. It is bounded on the west by the Beaufort Sea; on the northwest by the Arctic Ocean; on the east by Greenland, Baffin Bay and Davis Strait; and on the south by Hudson Bay and the Canadian mainland. The various islands are separated from each other and the continental mainland by a series of waterways collectively known as the Northwest Passage. Two large peninsulas, Boothia and Melville, extend northward from the mainland. The northernmost cluster of islands, including Ellesmere Island, is known as the Queen Elizabeth Islands and was formerly the Parry Islands.

The archipelago consists of 36,563 islands, of which 94 are classified as major islands, being larger than 130 km^{2} (50 sq mi), and cover a total area of 1,400,000 km^{2} (540,000 sq mi).

As of 2026, there are 20 islands in the Canadian Arctic over 5,000 km^{2} (1,900 sq mi). They are listed in order of descending area below. There are a further 19 islands greater than 1,000 km (620 mi) but under 5,000 km^{2} (1,900 sq mi) in Arctic Canada. (Note: All areas from the United States Geological Survey, Esri, and the United Nations Environment Programme - World Conservation Monitoring Centre unless indicated otherwise) As of 2021 the total population of all islands in the Arctic was 23,073.

Rank	Canada rank	World rank	Name (group)	Area (2026)		Territory	Pop (2021)	Notes	Ref	Coordinates
Rank	Canada rank	World rank	Name (group)	(km^{2})	(sq mi)	Territory	Pop (2021)	Notes	Ref	Coordinates
1	1	5	Baffin Island	507,204.95	195,832.93	NU	13,039	Largest in Canada, second in North America, and fifth in the world. Population does not include Kinngait (1,396) and Qikiqtarjuaq (593). Both of which do not lie on Baffin Island proper		68°N 70°W
2	2	8	Victoria Island	219,191.31	84,630.24	NT, NU	2,168	Contains the world's largest island within an island within an island.		70°25′N 107°45′W
3	3	10	Ellesmere Island (Queen Elizabeth Islands)	197,790.33	76,367.27	NU	144	Canada's northernmost island. Population includes Grise Fiord, Alert and Eureka.		79°50′N 78°00′W
4	5	24	Banks Island	70,191.02	27,100.90	NT	104	Robert McClure's ship, HMS Investigator was found at Mercy Bay in 2010. The ship had been lost during the McClure Arctic expedition. The summer home to hundreds of thousands of migratory birds who nest at Banks Island Migratory Bird Sanctuary No. 1 and Banks Island Migratory Bird Sanctuary No. 2.		72°45′02″N 121°30′10″W
5	6	27	Devon Island (Queen Elizabeth Islands)	55,535.39	21,442.33	NU	0	The largest uninhabited island in the world		75°15′N 088°00′W
6	7	32	Southampton Island	43,069.35	16,629.17	NU	1,035	The only area in Nunavut, that does not use daylight saving time.		64°20′N 084°40′W
7	8	33	Melville Island (Queen Elizabeth Islands)	42,330.26	16,343.80	NT, NU	0	One of two major breeding grounds for the brant geese. DNA analysis and field observations suggest that these birds may be distinct from other brant stocks. The most northerly report of a grizzly bear sighting occurred here in 2003.		75°30′02″N 111°30′09″W
8	9	34	Axel Heiberg Island (Queen Elizabeth Islands)	42,276.97	16,323.23	NU	0	Location of the McGill Arctic Research Station that was established in 1960. Known for its unusual fossil forests, which date from the Eocene period.		79°45′N 091°00′W
9	10	40	Prince of Wales Island	33,307.98	12,860.28	NU	0	The CBC series North of North is set in the fictional town of Ice Cove, which is situated on the island.		72°40′N 99°00′W
10	12	46	Somerset Island	24,754.51	9,557.77	NU	0	Site of Fort Ross, Nunavut, last trading post established by the Hudson's Bay Company.		73°15′N 93°30′W
11	13	54	Bathurst Island (Queen Elizabeth Islands)	16,050.61	6,197.18	NU	0	Site of Brooman Point Village, a Dorset, Paleo-Eskimo and Thule village, and Qausuittuq National Park, and the Nanuit Itillinga National Wildlife Area.		75°45′N 100°00′W
12	14	55	Prince Patrick Island (Queen Elizabeth Islands)	15,792.19	6,097.40	NT, NU	0	Home of the now abandoned Mould Bay Weather Station, part of the Joint Arctic Weather Station system between Canada and the United States opened in 1948. (Note: Listed as Elleg Ringens)		76°45′02″N 119°30′12″W
13	15	59	King William Island	13,174.63	5,086.75	NU	1,349	Sir John Franklin’s two ships, HMS Erebus and HMS Terror, were found in what is now the Wrecks of HMS Erebus and HMS Terror National Historic Site.		69°10′N 97°25′W
14	16	67	Ellef Ringnes Island (Sverdrup Islands; Queen Elizabeth Islands)	11,350.45	4,382.43	NU	0	Isachsen, opened in 1948, formerly staffed weather station, but now an Automated Surface Observing System		78°30′N 102°15′W
15	17	69	Bylot Island	11,057.96	4,269.50	NU	0	Home to Sirmilik National Park and Bylot Island Migratory Bird Sanctuary		73°13′N 78°34′W
16	19	78	Prince Charles Island	9,665.87	3,732.01	NU	0	Inuit visited the island to hunt caribou		67°47′N 76°12′W
17	21	96	Cornwallis Island (Queen Elizabeth Islands)	7,070.11	2,729.78	NU	183	Resolute, the only community, was established in 1953 by forced migration known as the High Arctic relocation.		75°08′N 95°00′W
18	24	106	Coats Island	5,708.64	2,204.12	NU	0	The last home of the Sadlermiut.		62°30′N 083°00′W
19	25	112	Amund Ringnes Island (Sverdrup Islands; Queen Elizabeth Islands)	5,289.51	2,042.29	NU	0			78°20′N 96°25′W
20	26	116	Mackenzie King Island (Queen Elizabeth Islands)	5,056.27	1,952.24	NT, NU	0			78°02′N 109°50′W

After Greenland, the archipelago is the world's largest high-Arctic land area. The climate of the islands is Arctic, and the terrain consists of tundra except in mountainous regions. Most of the islands are uninhabited; human settlement is extremely thin and scattered, being mainly coastal Inuit settlements on the southern islands.

== Map with links to islands ==
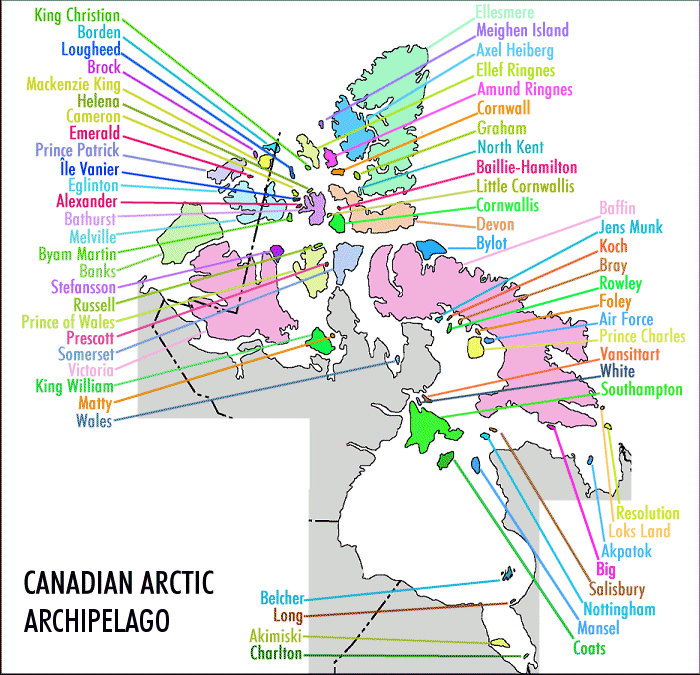
Reference map of Canadian Arctic Archipelago

- King Christian^{map 1}
- Borden^{map 2}
- Lougheed^{map 3}
- Brock^{map 4}
- Mackenzie King^{map 5}
- Helena^{map 6}
- Cameron^{map 7}
- Emerald^{map 8}
- Prince Patrick^{map 9}
- Île Vanier^{map 10}
- Eglinton^{map 11}
- Alexander^{map 12}
- Bathurst^{map 13}
- Melville^{map 14}
- Byam Martin^{map 15}
- Banks^{map 16}
- Stefansson^{map 17}
- Russell^{map 18}
- Prince of Wales^{map 19}
- Prescott^{map 20}
- Somerset^{map 21}
- Victoria^{map 22}
- King William^{map 23}
- Matty^{map 24}
- Wales^{map 25}
- Belcher^{map 26}
- Long^{map 27}
- Akimiski^{map 28}
- Charlton^{map 29}
- Ellesmere^{map 30}
- Meighen^{map 31}
- Axel Heiberg^{map 32}
- Ellef Ringnes^{map 33}
- Amund Ringnes^{map 34}
- Cornwall^{map 35}
- Graham^{map 36}
- North Kent^{map 37}
- Baillie-Hamilton^{map 38}
- Little Cornwallis^{map 39}
- Cornwallis^{map 40} (Note: Population: 183)
- Devon^{map 41}
- Bylot^{map 42}
- Baffin^{map 43}
- Kapuiviit^{map 44} (Note: Formerly Jens Munk Island)
- Koch^{map 45}
- Bray^{map 46}
- Rowley^{map 47}
- Foley^{map 48}
- Air Force^{map 49}
- Prince Charles^{map 50}
- Nagjuttuuq^{map 51} (Note: Formerly Vansittart Island)
- Qikiqtaaluk (Foxe Basin)^{map 52} (Note: Formerly White Island)
- Southampton^{map 53}
- Resolution^{map 54}
- Loks^{map 55}
- Akpatok^{map 56}
- Qikiqtarjuaq (Hudson Strait)^{map 57} (Note: Formerly Big Island)
- Salisbury^{map 58}
- Nottingham^{map 59}
- Mansel^{map 60}
- Coats^{map 61}

Islands not on map

- Beechey^{map 62}
- Broughton^{map 63} (Note: Population: 593)
- Cape Chidley^{map 64}
- Dorset^{map 65} (Note: Population: 1,396)
- Duke of York^{map 66}
- East Pen^{map 67}
- Flaherty^{map 68} (Note: Population: 1,010)
- Haig-Thomas^{map 69}
- Hans^{map 70}
- Herschel^{map 71}
- Igloolik^{map 72} (Note: Population: 2,049)
- Killiniq^{map 73}
- Ottawa^{map 74}
- Prince Leopold^{map 75}
- Qikiqtaryuaq^{map 76} (Note: Formerly Jenny Lind Island)
- Skraeling^{map 77}
- Trodely^{map 78}
- Umingmalik^{map 79} (Note: Formerly Gateshead Island)
- Weston^{map 80}

== Communities ==
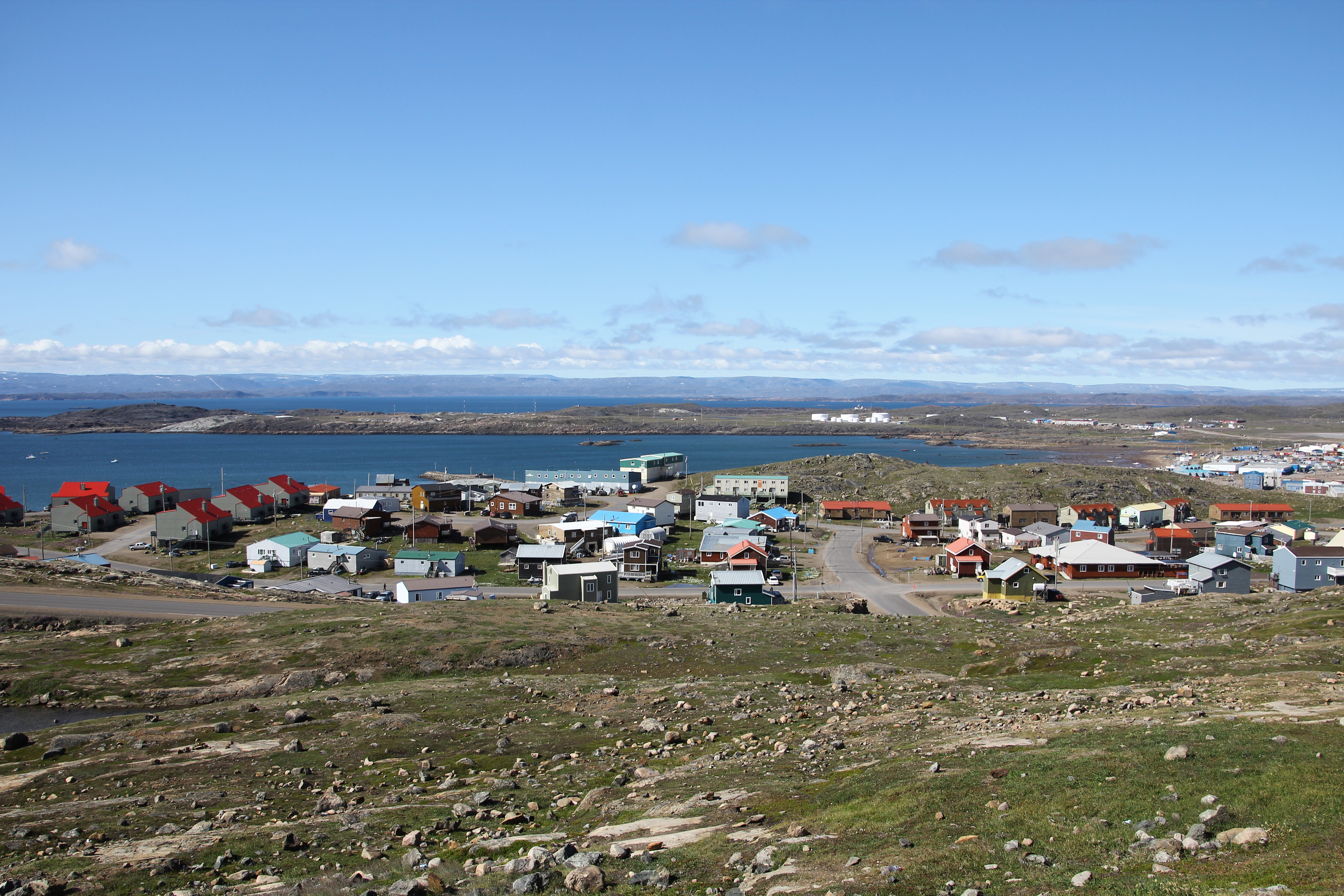
Iqaluit

Community	Island	Region, territory	Population
Arctic Bay	Baffin Island	Qikiqtaaluk, NU	944
Clyde River	Baffin Island	Qikiqtaaluk, NU	1,181
Iqaluit	Baffin Island	Qikiqtaaluk, NU	7,429
Kimmirut	Baffin Island	Qikiqtaaluk, NU	426
Pangnirtung	Baffin Island	Qikiqtaaluk, NU	1,504
Pond Inlet	Baffin Island	Qikiqtaaluk, NU	1,555
Sachs Harbour	Banks Island	Inuvik, NT	104
Qikiqtarjuaq	Broughton Island	Qikiqtaaluk, NU	593
Resolute	Cornwallis Island	Qikiqtaaluk, NU	183
Kinngait	Dorset Island	Qikiqtaaluk, NU	1,396
Grise Fiord	Ellesmere Island	Qikiqtaaluk, NU	144
Sanikiluaq	Flaherty Island	Qikiqtaaluk, NU	1,010
Igloolik	Igloolik Island	Qikiqtaaluk, NU	2,049
Gjoa Haven	King William Island	Kitikmeot, NU	1,349
Coral Harbour	Southampton Island	Kivalliq, NU	1,038
Cambridge Bay	Victoria Island	Kitikmeot, NU	1,760
Ulukhaktok	Victoria Island	Inuvik, NT	408
		Total	23,073

== Populated islands ==
Of the more than 36,000 islands, only 11 are populated. Baffin Island, the largest, also has the largest population of 13,309. The population accounts for 67.37 per cent of the 19,355 people in the Qikiqtaaluk Region, 56.51 per cent of the population of the Arctic Archipelago, and 35.38 per cent of the population of Nunavut.

Island	Population	Area (km2)	Area (sq mi)	Density (km2)	Density (sq mi)
Baffin Island	13,039	507,451	315,315	0.026	0.067
Banks Island	104	70,028	43,513	0.001	0.004
Broughton Island	593	127.6	79.3	4.647	12.037
Cornwallis Island	183	6,995	4,346	0.026	0.068
Dorset Island	1,396	21	8	174.500	67.375
Ellesmere Island	144	196,236	121,935	0.001	0.002
Flaherty Island	1,010	1,585	985	0.637	1.650
Igloolik Island	2,049	114.5	71.1	17.895	46.348
King William Island	1,349	13,111	8,147	0.103	0.266
Southampton Island	1,038	41,214	25,609	0.103	0.266
Victoria Island	2,168	217,291	135,018	0.010	0.026

== Mapping ==
- ^map 1King Christian, 77°45′N 102°00′W
- ^map 2Borden, 78°33′N 111°10′W
- ^map 3Lougheed, 77°24′N 105°15′W
- ^map 4Brock, 77°51′N 114°27′W
- ^map 5Mackenzie King 77°43′N 111°57′W
- ^map 6Helena, 76°40′N 101°00′W
- ^map 7Cameron, 77°48′N 101°51′W
- ^map 8Emerald Isle, 76°48′N 114°07′W
- ^map 9Prince Patrick, 76°45′N 119°30′W
- ^map 10Île Vanier, 76°10′N 103°15′W
- ^map 11Eglinton, 75°46′N 118°27′W
- ^map 12Alexander, 75°52′N 102°37′W
- ^map 13Bathurst, 75°46′N 099°47′W
- ^map 14Melville, 75°30′N 111°30′W
- ^map 15Byam Martin, 75°12′N 104°17′W
- ^map 16Banks, 73°00′N 121°30′W
- ^map 17Stefansson, 73°30′N 105°30′W
- ^map 18Russell, 74°00′N 098°25′W
- ^map 19Prince of Wales, 72°36′N 098°32′W
- ^map 20Prescott, 73°03′N 096°49′W
- ^map 21Somerset, 73°15′N 093°30′W
- ^map 22Victoria, 71°00′N 110°00′W
- ^map 23King William, 68°58′N 097°14′W
- ^map 24Matty, 69°28′N 095°40′W
- ^map 25Wales, 68°01′N 086°40′W
- ^map 26Belcher, 56°20′N 079°30′W
- ^map 27Long, 54°52′N 079°25′W
- ^map 28Akimiski, 53°00′N 081°20′W
- ^map 29Charlton, 52°00′N 079°26′W
- ^map 30Ellesmere, 79°49′N 078°00′W
- ^map 31Meighen, 79°59′N 099°30′W
- ^map 32Axel Heiberg, 79°26′N 090°46′W
- ^map 33Ellef Ringnes, 78°37′N 101°56′W
- ^map 34Amund Ringnes, 78°19′N 096°25′W
- ^map 35Cornwall, 77°37′N 094°52′W
- ^map 36Graham, 77°26′N 090°30′W
- ^map 37North Kent, 76°40′N 090°15′W
- ^map 38Baillie-Hamilton, 75°53′N 094°35′W
- ^map 39Little Cornwallis, 75°30′N 096°30′W
- ^map 40Cornwallis, 75°05′N 095°00′W
- ^map 41Devon, 75°15′N 088°00′W
- ^map 42Bylot, 73°13′N 078°34′W
- ^map 43Baffin, 69°00′N 072°00′W
- ^map 44Jens Munk, 69°40′N 079°40′W
- ^map 45Koch, 69°35′N 078°20′W
- ^map 46Bray, 69°20′N 077°00′W
- ^map 47Rowley, 69°05′N 078°52′W
- ^map 48Foley, 68°30′N 075°00′W
- ^map 49Air Force, 67°58′N 074°05′W
- ^map 50Prince Charles, 67°45′N 076°00′W
- ^map 51Vansittart, 65°50′N 084°00′W
- ^map 52White, 65°46′N 084°53′W
- ^map 53Southampton, 64°30′N 084°30′W
- ^map 54Resolution, 61°35′N 065°00′W
- ^map 55Loks Land, 62°26′N 064°38′W
- ^map 56Akpatok, 60°25′N 068°08′W
- ^map 57Big, 62°43′N 070°43′W
- ^map 58Salisbury, 63°35′N 077°00′W
- ^map 59Nottingham, 63°17′N 077°55′W
- ^map 60Mansel, 62°00′N 079°50′W
- ^map 61Coats, 62°35′N 082°45′W
- ^map 62Beechey, 74°43′N 091°51′W
- ^map 63Broughton, 67°34′N 063°54′W
- ^map 64Cape Chidley, 60°25′45″N 64°27′50″W
- ^map 65Dorset, 64°12′N 76°32′W
- ^map 66Duke of York, 68°15′N 112°30′W
- ^map 67East Pen, 56°45′N 088°40′W
- ^map 68Flaherty, 56°14′N 079°17′W
- ^map 69Haig-Thomas, 78°15′N 094°30′W
- ^map 70Hans, 80°49′N 066°27′W
- ^map 71Herschel, 69°35′N 139°04′W
- ^map 72Igloolik, 69°23′N 081°40′W
- ^map 73Killiniq, 60°22′N 064°37′W
- ^map 74Ottawa, 59°34′N 080°16′W
- ^map 75Prince Leopold, 74°01′N 090°04′W
- ^map 76Jenny Lind, 68°43′N 101°58′W
- ^map 77Skraeling, 78°55′N 075°40′W
- ^map 78Trodely, 52°14′N 079°26′W
- ^map 79Gateshead, 70°35′N 100°25′W
- ^map 80Weston, 52°32′N 079°35′W

== See also ==
- Last Ice Area
- List of islands of Canada
- Geography of Canada
