= Qikiqtarjuaq Airport =

Airport in Nunavut, Canada

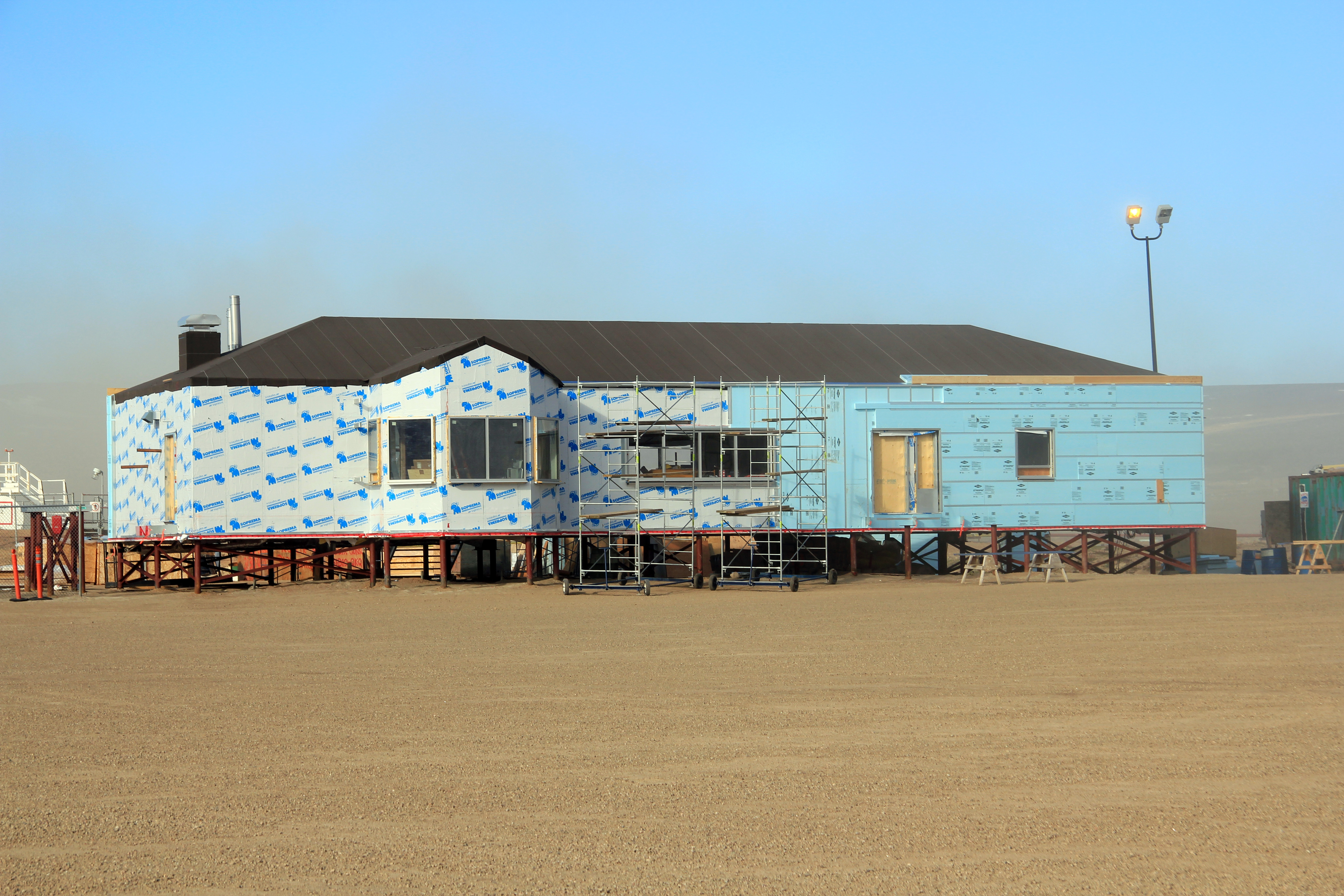
- Airport terminal under construction (2011)
- IATA: YVM; ICAO: CYVM; WMO: 71338

Summary
- Airport type: Public
- Operator: Government of Nunavut
- Location: Qikiqtarjuaq, Nunavut
- Time zone: EST (UTC−05:00)
  - Summer (DST): EDT (UTC−04:00)
- Elevation AMSL: 18 ft / 5 m
- Coordinates: 67°32′48″N 64°01′54″W

Map
- Location in Nunavut CYVM (Canada)

Runways
Direction	Length		Surface
Direction	ft	m	Surface
03/21	3,803	1,159	Gravel

Statistics (2010)
- Aircraft movements: 1,039
- Sources: Canada Flight Supplement; Environment Canada; Movements from Statistics Canada

Qikiqtarjuaq Airport (IATA: YVM, ICAO: CYVM) is located at Qikiqtarjuaq, Nunavut, Canada, and is operated by the government of Nunavut.

This airport is a popular stop for pilots ferrying turboprop aircraft between Canada and Europe. It is considerably closer to Greenland (Kangerlussuaq Airport, 767 km [477 mi]) than is Iqaluit Airport (2,912 km [1,809 mi]). Jet fuel is available from the airport fuel supplier. Avgas may be available from the town council, but this needs to be confirmed in advance.

One instrument approach is available, an NDB or GNSS circling approach. Approach minimums are higher than average (2,000 ft (610 m) MSL, 1,982 ft (604 m) AGL) due to high terrain in the area. The runway is listed as gravel-surfaced, but is in fact a mixture of very firmly packed fine sand and gravel that has a surface texture similar to asphalt. A large overnight parking area is available, but crew must bring their own tie-down anchors. An airport advisory service, Qikiqtarjuaq Airport Radio, a Community Airport Radio Station (CARS), provides assistance to pilots during normal business hours, and provides weather observation services. An automatic weather observation service (AWOS) operates when Qikiqtarjuaq Radio is unattended. The fuel supplier at the airport can assist with all ground handling arrangements, including transportation, parking, de-icing, and accommodations.

Qikiqtarjuaq is the destination of the eponymous episode of Cabin Pressure, a BBC radio sit-com set in a one-aircraft airline.

== Airlines and destinations ==
Airlines	Destinations
Canadian North	Iqaluit, Pangnirtung
