= Reid Bay =

Bay in Nunavut, Canada

- Location within Nunavut
- Location: Western Davis Strait
- Coordinates: 66°57′N 62°02′W
- Ocean/sea sources: Arctic Ocean
- Basin countries: Canada
- Surface area: 5 km^{2} (1.9 sq mi)
- Settlements: Uninhabited

Reid Bay is an Arctic waterway in the Qikiqtaaluk Region, Nunavut, Canada. It is located in Davis Strait off Baffin Island's Cumberland Sound.

== Geography ==
The habitat is characterized by open sea, inlets, coastal marine features, coastal cliffs, rocky marine shores, scree, and boulders. Its coastal elevation rises up to 800 m (2,600 ft) above sea level.

== Fauna ==
The uninhabited bay area is a Canadian Important Bird Area (NU072), and International Biological Program site (Region 9, Site 7–9). Notable bird species include: black-legged kittiwake, colonial water birds / seabirds, glaucous gull, Iceland gull, northern fulmar, and thick-billed murre.

The former Reid Bay Key Migratory Bird Terrestrial Habitat site has been renamed Akpait National Wildlife Area (66°53′42″N 61°45′18″W), coinciding with its location at Akapit Fiord.
