= Qikiqtarjuaq =

Qikiqtarjuaq ᕿᑭᖅᑕᕐᔪᐊᖅ
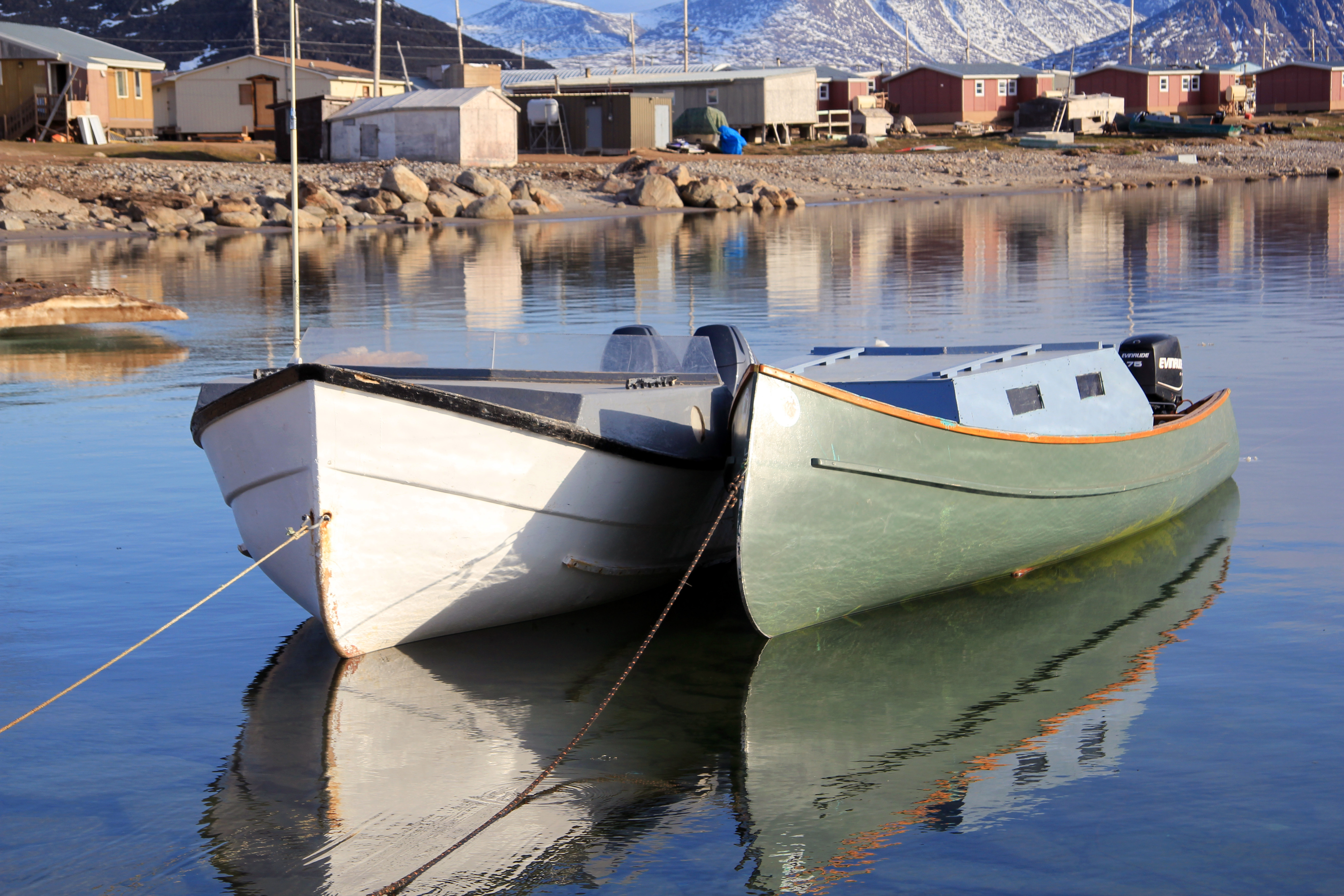
- Qikiqtarjuaq in 2011

- Location within Nunavut Location within Canada
- Coordinates: 67°33′17″N 064°01′41″W
- Country: Canada
- Territory: Nunavut
- Region: Qikiqtaaluk
- Electoral district: Uqqummiut

Government
  - Type: Hamlet Council
  - Mayor: Jonah Audlakiak
  - MLAs: Gordon Kautuk

Area (2021)
  - Total: 130.8 km^{2} (50.5 sq mi)
- Elevation: 6 m (20 ft)

Population (2024)
  - Total: 593
  - Density: 4.5/km^{2} (12/sq mi)
- Time zone: UTC−05:00 (EST)
  - Summer (DST): UTC−04:00 (EDT)
- Canadian Postal code: X0A 0B0
- Area code: 867

Qikiqtarjuaq (Inuktitut pronunciation: [qikiqtaʁjuˈaq] 'big island'; formerly known as Broughton Island until November 1998 /ˈbrɔːtən/,) is a community located on Broughton Island in the Qikiqtaaluk Region of Nunavut, Canada. The island is known for Arctic wildlife (ringed seals, polar bears, bowhead whales, narwhals), and bird watching at the Qaqulluit National Wildlife Area (qaqulluit is the Inuktitut word for northern fulmar). The community serves as the northern access point for Auyuittuq National Park with Pangnirtung as the southern access point.

Qikiqtarjuaq hosts an annual Suicide Prevention Walk. Local participants would walk a total distance of 60 km (37 mi) across the tundra from Kivitoo, an old whaling station. Today the walk is much shorter than the original two and a half days, but it is still meant to promote hope among the community.

The community hosts a two-week celebration over the Christmas and New Year period every year. Visitors are warmly welcomed and encouraged to join the festivities and games.

Near Qikiqtarjuaq was the home of FOX-5, a Distant Early Warning Line and now a North Warning System site.

In July 2011, Qikiqtarjuaq was featured in the BBC Radio 4 comedy series Cabin Pressure.

== Geography ==
Qikiqtarjuaq is situated above the Arctic Circle and off eastern Baffin Island. Both Davis Strait and Baffin Bay run to the east, and the Baffin Mountains are located to the west, more specifically, the Arctic Cordillera mountain range. It is also one of the Nunavut communities closest to Greenland.

== History ==
Inuit has been using the area around Qikiqtarjuaq for generations to follow and hunt wildlife for food. Inuit made first contact with European whalers in July 1824. These contacts continued steadily until 1840s. By mid-19th century, the casual contacts turned into annual routines as whalers regularly anchored around Nuvuttiq (about 75 km southeast of Qikiqtarjuaq) and sheltering around Kivitoo (about 50 km northeast of Qikiqtarjuaq) late in the season. Qikiqtarjuaq residents adopted European goods and technologies into their daily life through whalers and traders, though these contacts also introduced new diseases into the Qikiqtarjuaq population. Between 1926 and 1955, there was minimal contact with the outside world because it had no trading post, no resident missionary and rarely visited by medical staff. RCMP sent a dog sled annual winter patrol to the area. Even Canadian government and Hudson's Bay Company's annual supply ships sailed past Qikiqtarjuaq without stopping.

When the area was selected as a DEW Line station, the Canadian government begin providing more services to Inuit in the community. Many Inuit moved to the area to search for employment opportunities at and around the DEW Line site. Fifteen Inuit were employed during construction of the station and they brought their immediate families and relatives with them to the community. Occasional conflicts broke out between Inuit and the American personnel in charged of constructing the DEW Line station. Additional conflicts arose when Royal Canadian Mounted Police (RCMP) raised concerns about Inuit loitering near the station even though RCMP recognized the area as a regular hunting ground and the station needed workers. Many Inuit also came to the DEW Line area out of curiosity. They also assumed that the station staff would share their foodstuffs as previous contacts with European whalers did. About 170 Inuit lived in Qikiqtarjuaq in 1958.

In 1961, Hudson Bay Company began constructing a store alongside a government school. Prefabricated houses also arrived in the same year, though in very low numbers. Most residents continue to live in tents. Kivitoo residents were coerced into moving to Qikiqtarjuaq in early 1960s for administrative efficiency. Sled dog population was decimated after disease spread to the settlement. RCMP also conducted sled dog slaughtering to force Inuit to stay in the settlement. The community began switching from using sled dogs to snowmobiles for hunting. An Anglican church was built in 1964 and a nursing station was established in 1967. The population swelled to 250 people by 1967, which included a dozen non-Inuit teachers, an administrator and a Hudson's Bay Company clerk. The government opened a caring and handicraft co-operative to provide women with their first source of formal cash income. By 1970, almost all Inuit in the area settled near FOX-5 DEW Line station. Community centre and freezer opened in 1974. Within the 1970s, many full-time hunters turned to regular wage jobs in the settlement. The lifestyle of its residents changed from subsidence economy with fur and skin trading to absolute dependence from outside sources for food, supplies and money.

== Demographics ==
Federal census population history of Qikiqtarjuaq
| Year | Pop. | ±% |
|---|---|---|
| 1976 | 354 | — |
| 1981 | 378 | +6.8% |
| 1986 | 439 | +16.1% |
| 1991 | 461 | +5.0% |
| 1996 | 488 | +5.9% |
| 2001 | 519 | +6.4% |
| 2006 | 473 | −8.9% |
| 2011 | 520 | +9.9% |
| 2016 | 598 | +15.0% |
| 2021 | 593 | −0.8% |
Source: Statistics Canada

In the 2021 Canadian census conducted by Statistics Canada, Qikiqtarjuaq had a population of 593 living in 164 of its 193 total private dwellings, a change of −0.8% from its 2016 population of 598. With a land area of 130.8 km^{2} (50.5 sq mi), it had a population density of 4.5/km^{2} (11.7/sq mi) in 2021.

== Services ==
It is served by Qikiqtarjuaq Airport, IATA: YVM, ICAO: CYVM.

There are two grocery stores: the Co-Op and the Northern Store (with a Canada Post kiosk). There are no restaurants or banks. Various accommodations are available. A health centre and Royal Canadian Mounted Police (RCMP) detachment are present as well. The health centre is composed of two nurses, an X-ray technician, a community health coordinator, a mental health worker, and administrative staff.

The community has a hamlet building where municipal affairs are conducted, with a large community hall and meeting room. There is one school for K-12 students called Inuksuit School, and attached to the building is a small campus for Nunavut Arctic College. The Piqalujaujaq Visitors Centre shares a building with the Auyuittuq National Park office. Access to Auyuittuq National Park north entrance is approximately two hours by boat in the summer months, two - two and a half hours by vehicle or snowmobile in winter months. All park visitors must register and book an orientation session prior to entry into the park, and non-Inuit who visit Auyuittuq must do so by hiring a local licensed operator.

Qikiqtarjuaq is a popular stop for pilots who fly smaller aircraft to and from Europe. The airport has a 3,803 by 100 ft (1,159 by 30 m) gravel runway that is maintained. Qikiqtarjuaq is considerably closer to Kangerlussuaq, Greenland than Iqaluit (CYFB). The instrument approach minima for the non-directional beacon (NDB) approach at CYVM is relatively high (2,000 feet barometric, 1,982 AGL) due to high terrain surrounding the airport. An airport advisory service, Qikiqtarjuaq Airport Radio, a Community Airport Radio Station (CARS), provides assistance to pilots during normal business hours and provides weather observation services. An automatic weather observation service (AWOS) operates when Qikiqtarjuaq Radio is unattended.

There is also an access road that was built to Tisunaaq, also known as Ceetee Land to the Elders, and another road is in construction to Qikiqtarjuaqruluk, or Old Broughton, an abandoned settlement. Kivitoo, an old whaling station, is located 90 km (56 mi) to the north and is currently abandoned.

== Broadband communications ==
The community has been served by the Qiniq network since 2005. Qiniq is a fixed wireless service to homes and businesses, connecting to the outside world via a satellite backbone. The Qiniq network is designed and operated by SSi Canada. In 2017, the network was upgraded to 4G LTE technology and 2G-GSM for mobile voice. In 2020, Bell Mobility established a data tower and, as of April 2026, provides high-speed mobile and internet connectivity within the community.

== Climate ==
Qikiqtarjuaq has a tundra climate (ET), with the warmest month averaging below 6 °C (43 °F). Summers tend to be cool with chilly nights, while winters are cold. Meteorological autumn (1 September to 30 November) is the snowiest time of the year, with just over half (50.6%) of the average annual snowfall occurring during this period.

Climate data for Qikiqtarjuaq (Qikiqtarjuaq Airport / AWOS) WMO ID: 71338; coordinates 67°32′45″N 64°01′53″W; elevation: 5.5 m (18 ft); 1991–2020 normals (Note: Climate data 1991–2020 is a composite recorded at Qikiqtarjuaq Climate (WMO ID: 71357; coordinates 67°32′51″N 64°02′00″W; elevation: 6.4 m (21 ft)), and Qikiqtarjuaq Airport (Climate ID: 2400577; coordinates 67°32′48″N 64°01′54″W; elevation: 5.5 m (18 ft))), extremes 1994–present
| Month | Jan | Feb | Mar | Apr | May | Jun | Jul | Aug | Sep | Oct | Nov | Dec | Year |
|---|---|---|---|---|---|---|---|---|---|---|---|---|---|
| Record high humidex | −3.5 | −5.9 | 1.7 | 6.1 | 9.0 | 17.9 | 23.8 | 21.5 | 16.6 | 11.3 | 4.7 | 6.2 | 23.8 |
| Record high °C (°F) | −2.2 (28.0) | −3.0 (26.6) | 2.2 (36.0) | 6.8 (44.2) | 9.2 (48.6) | 17.4 (63.3) | 23.8 (74.8) | 24.0 (75.2) | 15.6 (60.1) | 11.5 (52.7) | 6.8 (44.2) | 6.9 (44.4) | 24.0 (75.2) |
| Mean daily maximum °C (°F) | −22.1 (−7.8) | −23.7 (−10.7) | −19.9 (−3.8) | −11.3 (11.7) | −2.1 (28.2) | 4.1 (39.4) | 8.3 (46.9) | 7.8 (46.0) | 4.0 (39.2) | −1.0 (30.2) | −7.5 (18.5) | −16.3 (2.7) | −6.6 (20.1) |
| Daily mean °C (°F) | −26.6 (−15.9) | −28.1 (−18.6) | −24.6 (−12.3) | −16.6 (2.1) | −5.8 (21.6) | 1.5 (34.7) | 4.9 (40.8) | 5.2 (41.4) | 2.0 (35.6) | −3.9 (25.0) | −11.0 (12.2) | −20.5 (−4.9) | −10.3 (13.5) |
| Mean daily minimum °C (°F) | −31.0 (−23.8) | −32.5 (−26.5) | −29.4 (−20.9) | −21.7 (−7.1) | −9.4 (15.1) | −1.1 (30.0) | 1.5 (34.7) | 2.5 (36.5) | 0.0 (32.0) | −6.7 (19.9) | −14.4 (6.1) | −24.5 (−12.1) | −13.9 (7.0) |
| Record low °C (°F) | −48.5 (−55.3) | −47.1 (−52.8) | −47.5 (−53.5) | −39.5 (−39.1) | −29.0 (−20.2) | −13.0 (8.6) | −4.0 (24.8) | −5.0 (23.0) | −11.5 (11.3) | −21.0 (−5.8) | −31.5 (−24.7) | −41.5 (−42.7) | −48.5 (−55.3) |
| Record low wind chill | −56.4 | −55.1 | −57.0 | −45.4 | −32.6 | −12.9 | −8.9 | −7.2 | −14.0 | −22.8 | −42.7 | −51.6 | −57.0 |
| Average precipitation mm (inches) | 6.8 (0.27) | 6.8 (0.27) | 5.7 (0.22) | 16.0 (0.63) | 31.8 (1.25) | 18.6 (0.73) | 26.8 (1.06) | 26.1 (1.03) | 32.9 (1.30) | 46.1 (1.81) | 37.1 (1.46) | 7.3 (0.29) | 262.0 (10.31) |
| Average rainfall mm (inches) | 0.0 (0.0) | 0.0 (0.0) | 0.0 (0.0) | 0.0 (0.0) | 0.4 (0.02) | 3.4 (0.13) | 16.3 (0.64) | 15.9 (0.63) | 2.9 (0.11) | 0.3 (0.01) | 0.0 (0.0) | 0.0 (0.0) | 39.2 (1.54) |
| Average snowfall cm (inches) | 6.8 (2.7) | 6.8 (2.7) | 5.7 (2.2) | 16.0 (6.3) | 31.4 (12.4) | 15.2 (6.0) | 10.5 (4.1) | 10.2 (4.0) | 30.0 (11.8) | 45.8 (18.0) | 37.1 (14.6) | 7.3 (2.9) | 222.8 (87.7) |
| Average extreme snow depth cm (inches) | 48.0 (18.9) | 51.0 (20.1) | 56.0 (22.0) | 60.0 (23.6) | 53.0 (20.9) | 7.0 (2.8) | 0.0 (0.0) | 0.0 (0.0) | 1.0 (0.4) | 14.0 (5.5) | 28.0 (11.0) | 43.0 (16.9) | 30.0 (11.8) |
| Average precipitation days (≥ 0.2 mm) | 4.0 | 3.5 | 3.2 | 6.2 | 9.1 | 5.8 | 7.7 | 8.3 | 9.5 | 13.7 | 9.5 | 4.3 | 84.7 |
| Average rainy days (≥ 0.2 mm) | 0.0 | 0.0 | 0.0 | 0.0 | 0.05 | 0.95 | 5.5 | 5.6 | 0.84 | 0.21 | 0.0 | 0.0 | 13.1 |
| Average snowy days (≥ 0.2 cm) | 4.0 | 3.5 | 3.2 | 6.2 | 9.1 | 4.9 | 2.9 | 3.5 | 8.6 | 13.6 | 9.5 | 4.3 | 73.2 |
| Average relative humidity (%) (at 1500 LST) | 71.2 | 70.8 | 69.8 | 75.2 | 82.3 | 85.2 | 82.5 | 84.2 | 79.2 | 78.1 | 76.7 | 75.0 | 77.5 |
Source: Environment and Climate Change Canada Canadian Climate Normals 1991–2020 (Precipitation, including precipitation days, from Broughton Island, Canadian Climate Normals 1971-2000 Station Data)

== Around Qikiqtarjuaq ==
Around Qikiqtarjuaq
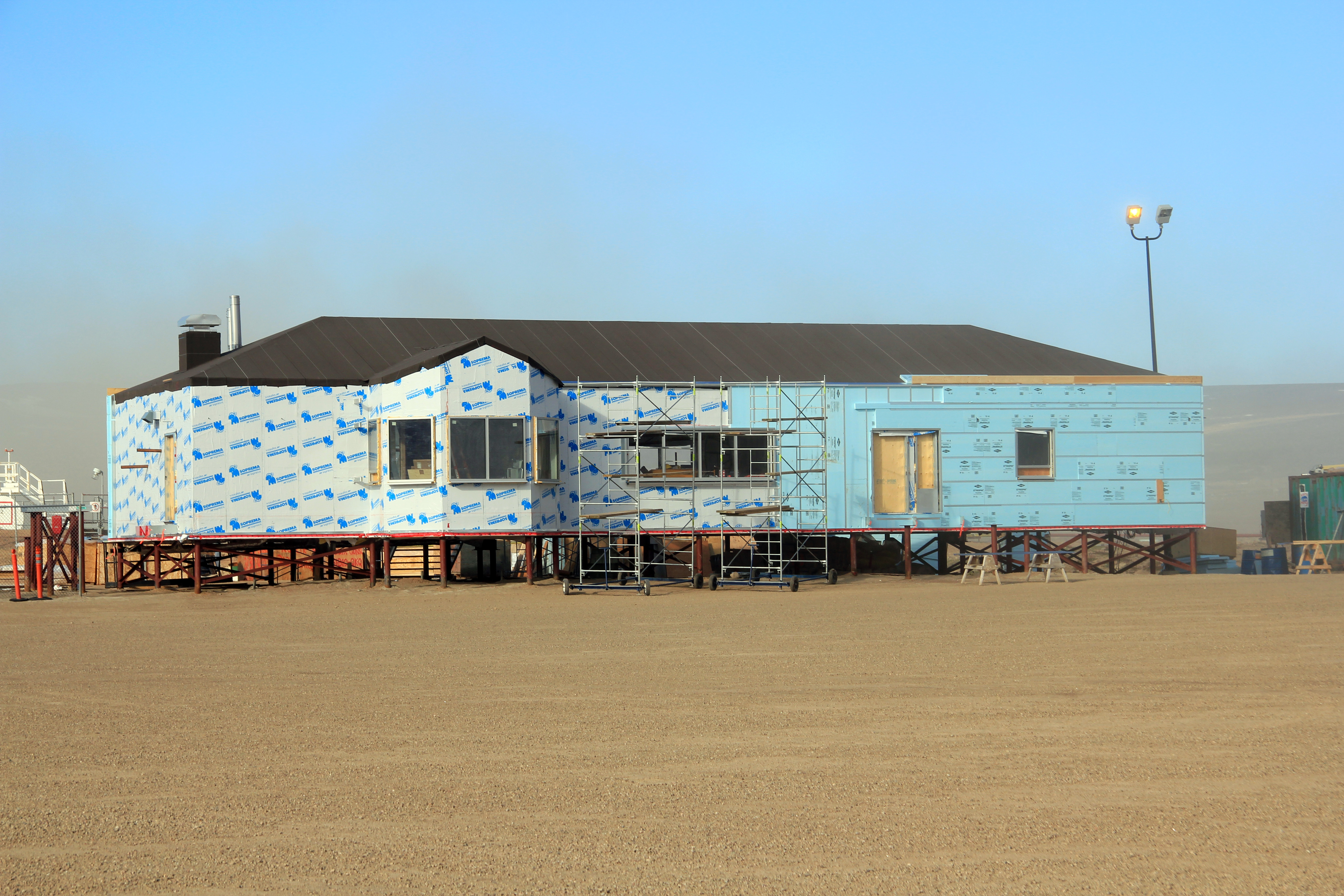
Airport terminal building

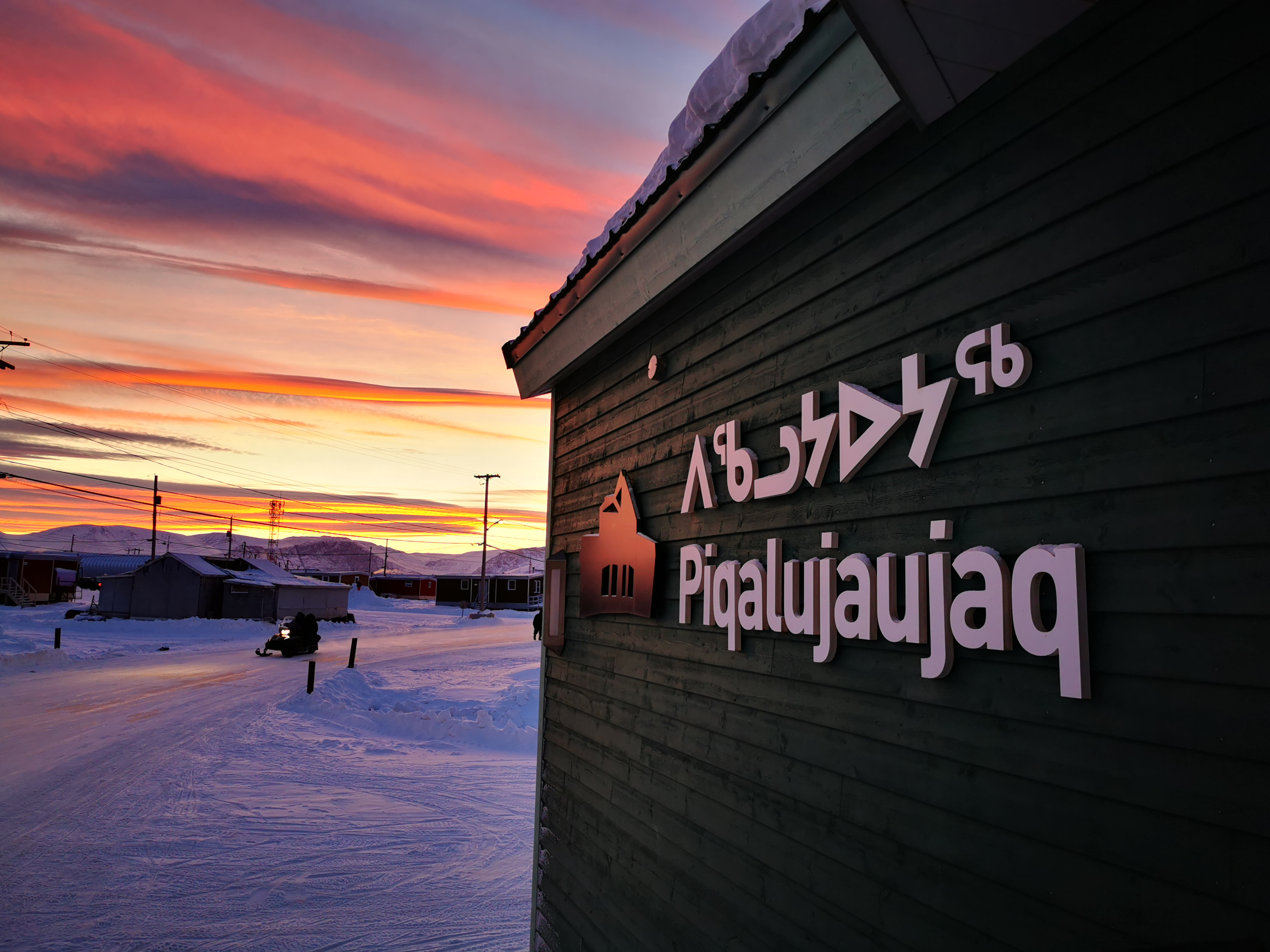
Piqaluaujaq Visitors Centre

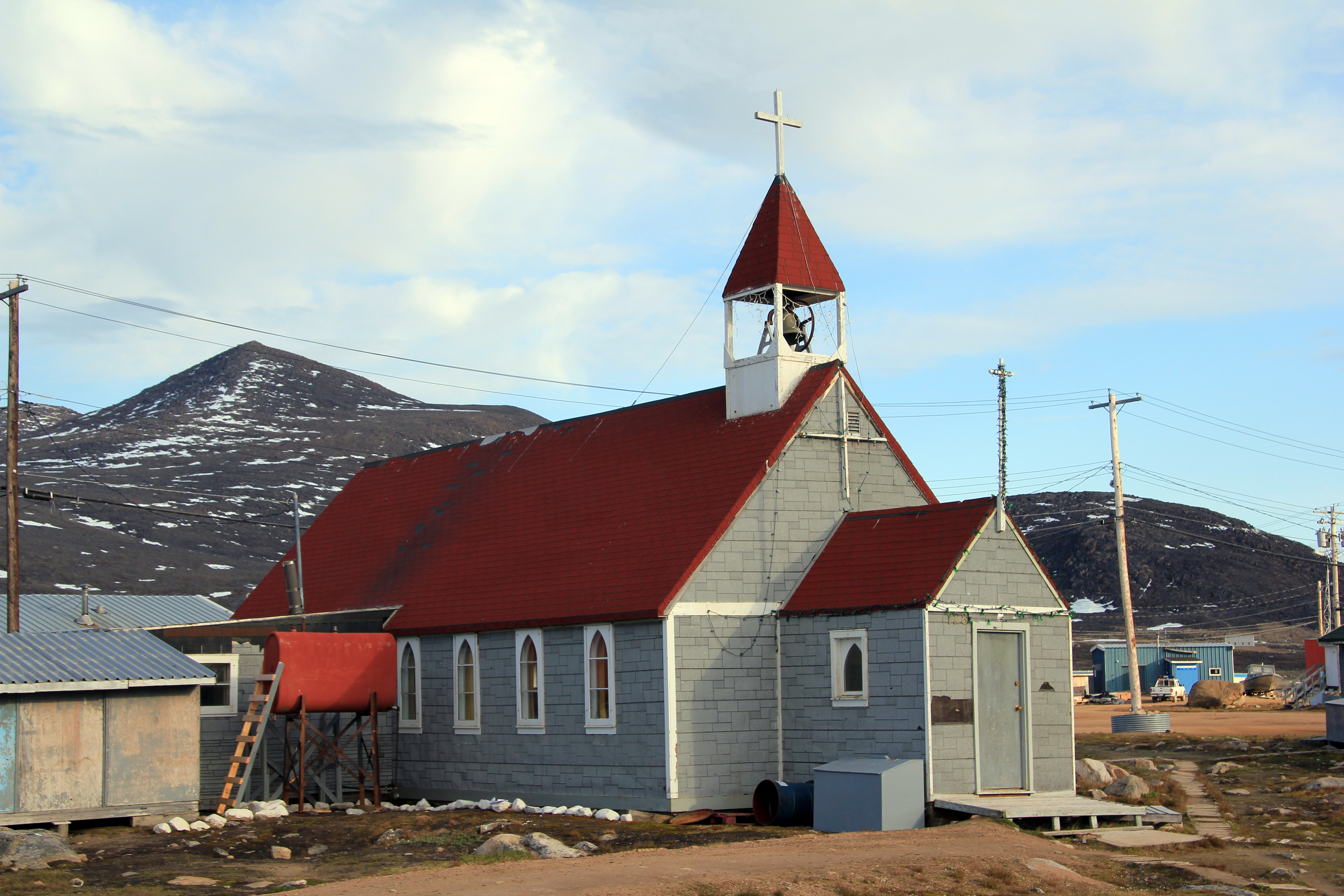
St. Michael and all Angels Church

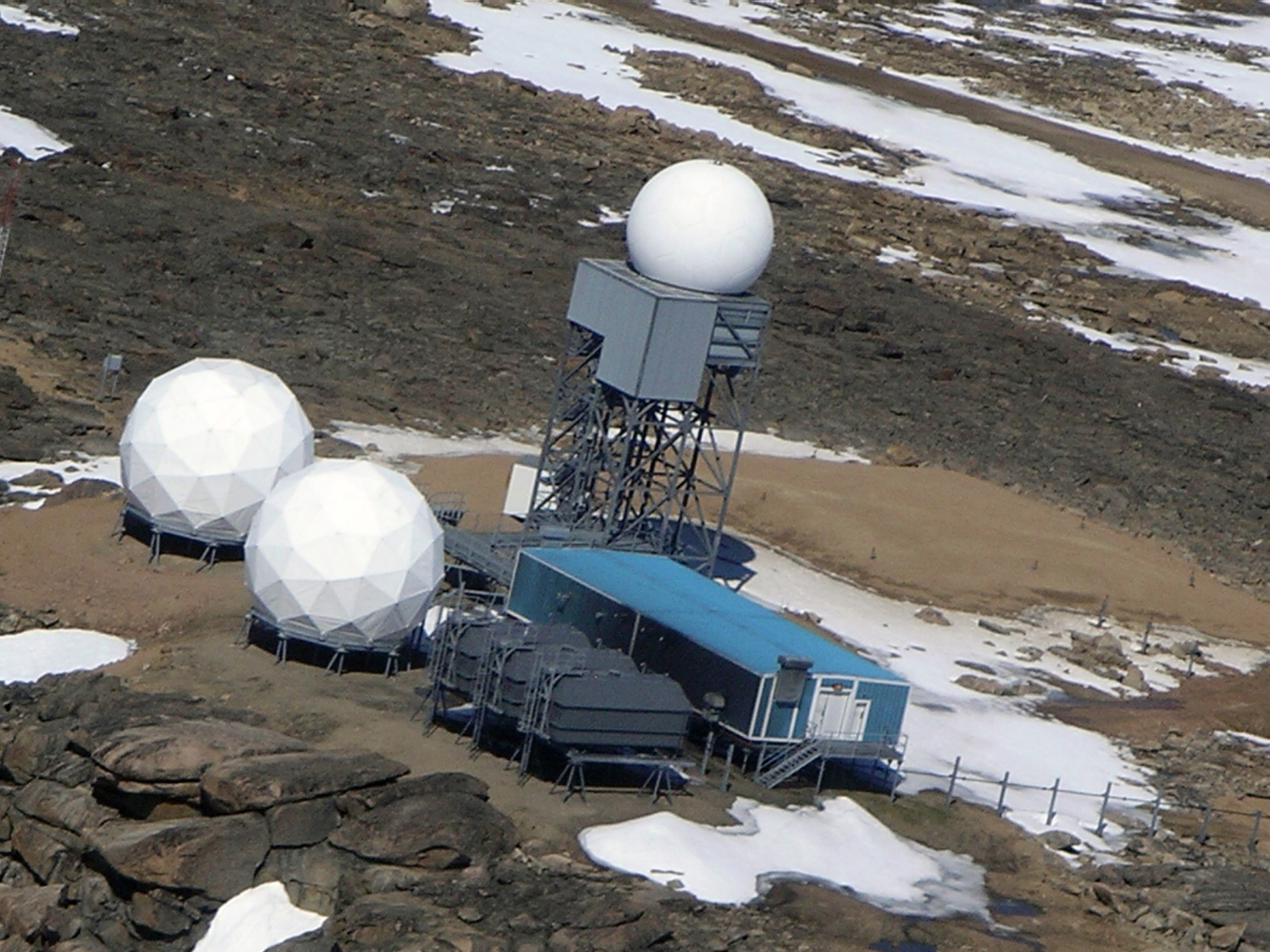
Fox 5 North Warning Site

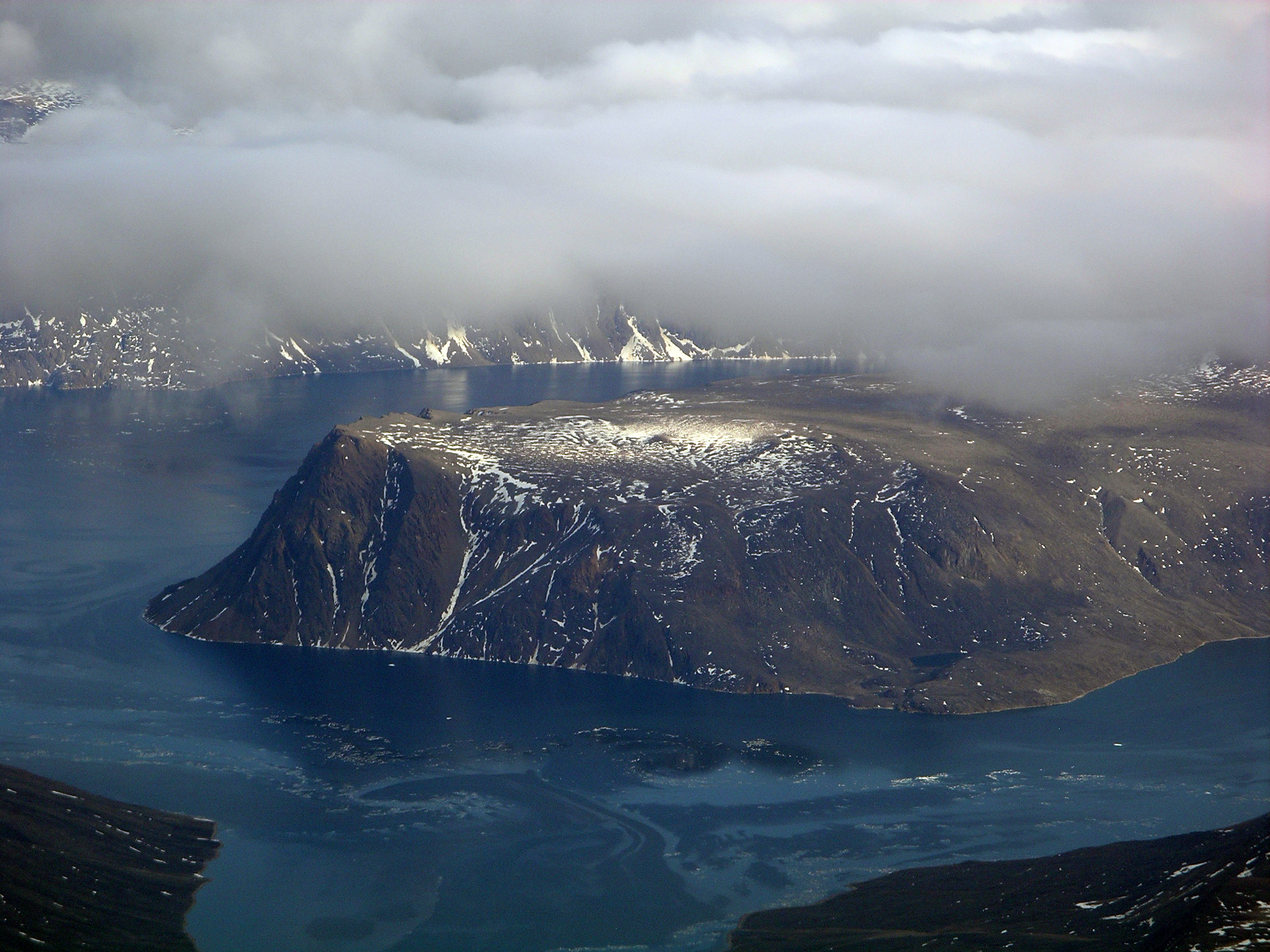
Mountains near Qikiqtarjuaq

== See also ==
- List of municipalities in Nunavut
