= Kivitoo =

Abandoned settlement in Nunavut, Canada

- Abandoned settlement
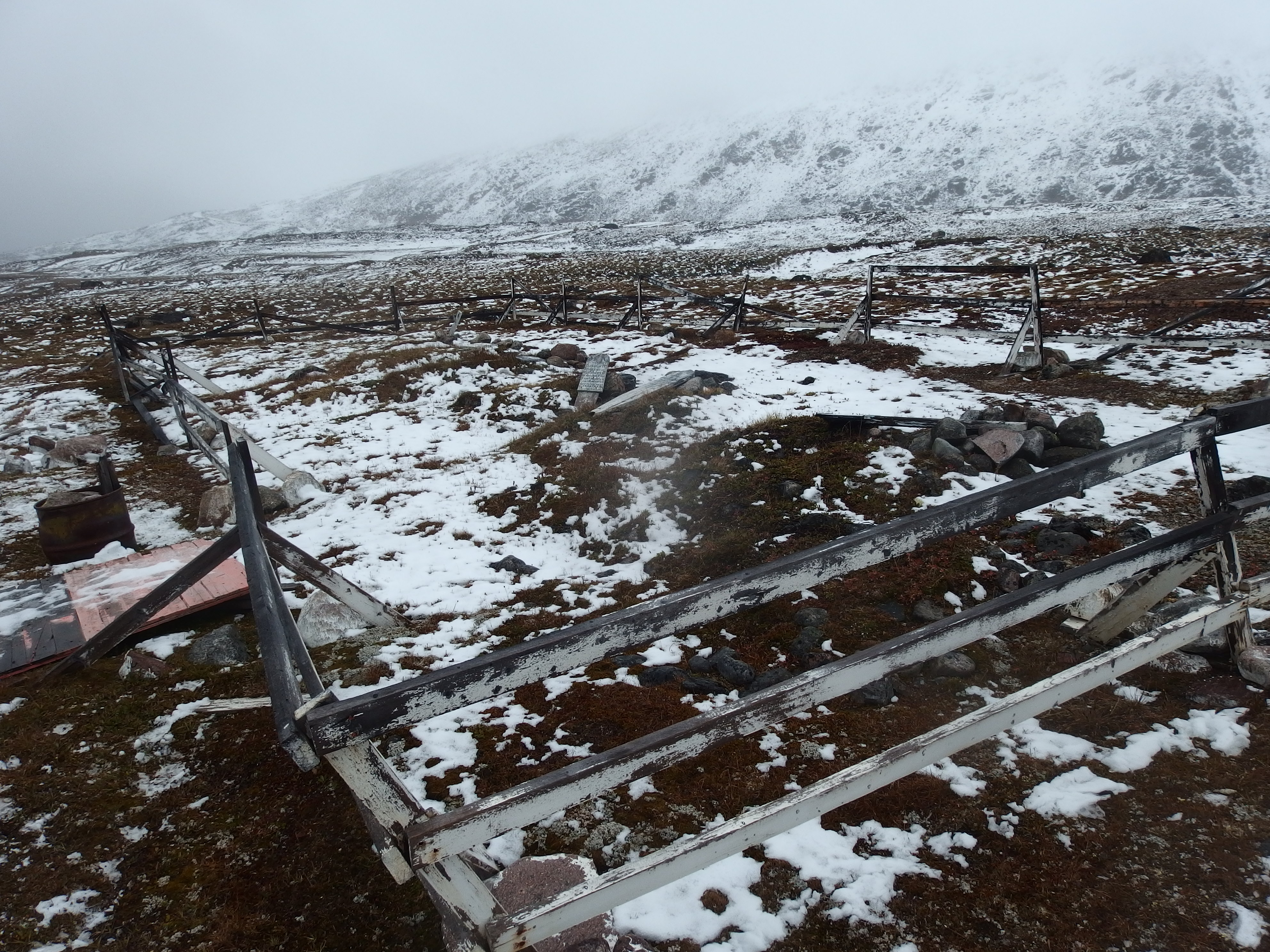
- Small cemetery in Kivitoo

- Location within Nunavut
- Coordinates: 67°56′N 64°52′W
- Country: Canada
- Territory: Nunavut
- Region: Qikiqtaaluk
- Highest elevation: 313 m (1,027 ft)

Population (2006)
  - Total: 0
- Time zone: UTC-5
  - Summer (DST): UTC-4 (EDT)

Kivitoo is an abandoned Inuit community and a former whaling station on the northeast shore of Baffin Island in Nunavut, Canada. Kivitoo's Inuit families moved to Qikiqtarjuaq, approximately 50 km (31 mi) to the south, in 1963. Kivitoo Memorial Park remains at the southern shore of the hamlet.

== History ==
In mid-19th century, European whalers regularly sheltered around Kivitoo late in the season. English and Scottish whalers refer Kivitoo as Hooper Harbour or Yakkie Fiord.

In the early 20th century, the Sabellum Trading Company established a post at Kivitoo to service the whalers who would anchor there to flense carcasses. At least one prominent Inuk from Kivitoo, Nowyakbik, travelled to England for pleasure and to advise Sabellum on consumer items as potential trade goods. The post was abandoned in 1926.

Kivitoo (qivittu) (FOX-D) is also a former Distant Early Warning Line and is currently a North Warning System site. Because of a nearby small coastal plain, a short airstrip was built during early operation of FOX-D.

The residents of Kivitoo were coerced to evacuate to Qikiqtarjuaq in 1963, purportedly for their safety, after three residents of the community were killed in a collapse of the ice under their igloos. However, the town was never resettled afterward, as the remaining structures in the community had been demolished by authorities by the time residents tried to return.

The evacuation and destruction of Kivitoo is the subject of Zacharias Kunuk's 2018 documentary film Kivitoo: What They Thought of Us.
