= Nuvuttiq =

Headland located on Qaqulluit, Nunavut, Canada

Nuvuttiq ᓄᕗᑦᑎᖅ (Inuktitut) Cape Searle
- Cape
- Coordinates: 67°13′49″N 062°27′37″WNuvuttiq at Natural Resources Canada
- Location: Qaqulluit, Nunavut
- Offshore water bodies: Davis Strait

Area
  - Total: 2 km^{2} (0.77 sq mi)
- Elevation: 450 m (1,480 ft)
- Topo map: NTS 16M1 Block Island

Nuvuttiq (ᓄᕗᑦᑎᖅ) formerly Cape Searle is an uninhabited headland located on Qaqulluit's northeastern tip, in the Qikiqtaaluk Region of Nunavut, Canada.

It was named by Arctic explorer John Ross on September 17, 1818 in honour of John Clark Searle, Esq., then Chairman of the Victualling Board.

== Geography ==
The habitat is characterized by coastal cliffs and rocky marine shores. It is 2 km^{2} (0.77 sq mi) in size, with an elevation rising up to 450 m (1,480 ft) above sea level.

== Fauna ==
Cape Searle is home to the largest northern fulmar colony in Canada.

== Conservation ==
It is a Canadian Important Bird Area (#NU003), an International Biological Program site and a Key Terrestrial Bird Habitat site.
