= Key Habitat Site =

Canadian Wildlife Service habitat designation

A Key Habitat Site is a Canadian Wildlife Service designation for an area that supports at least 1% of the country's population of any migratory bird species, or subspecies, at any time. There may be overlap with areas designated as migratory bird sanctuary or National Wildlife Area.
