= List of glaciers in Canada =

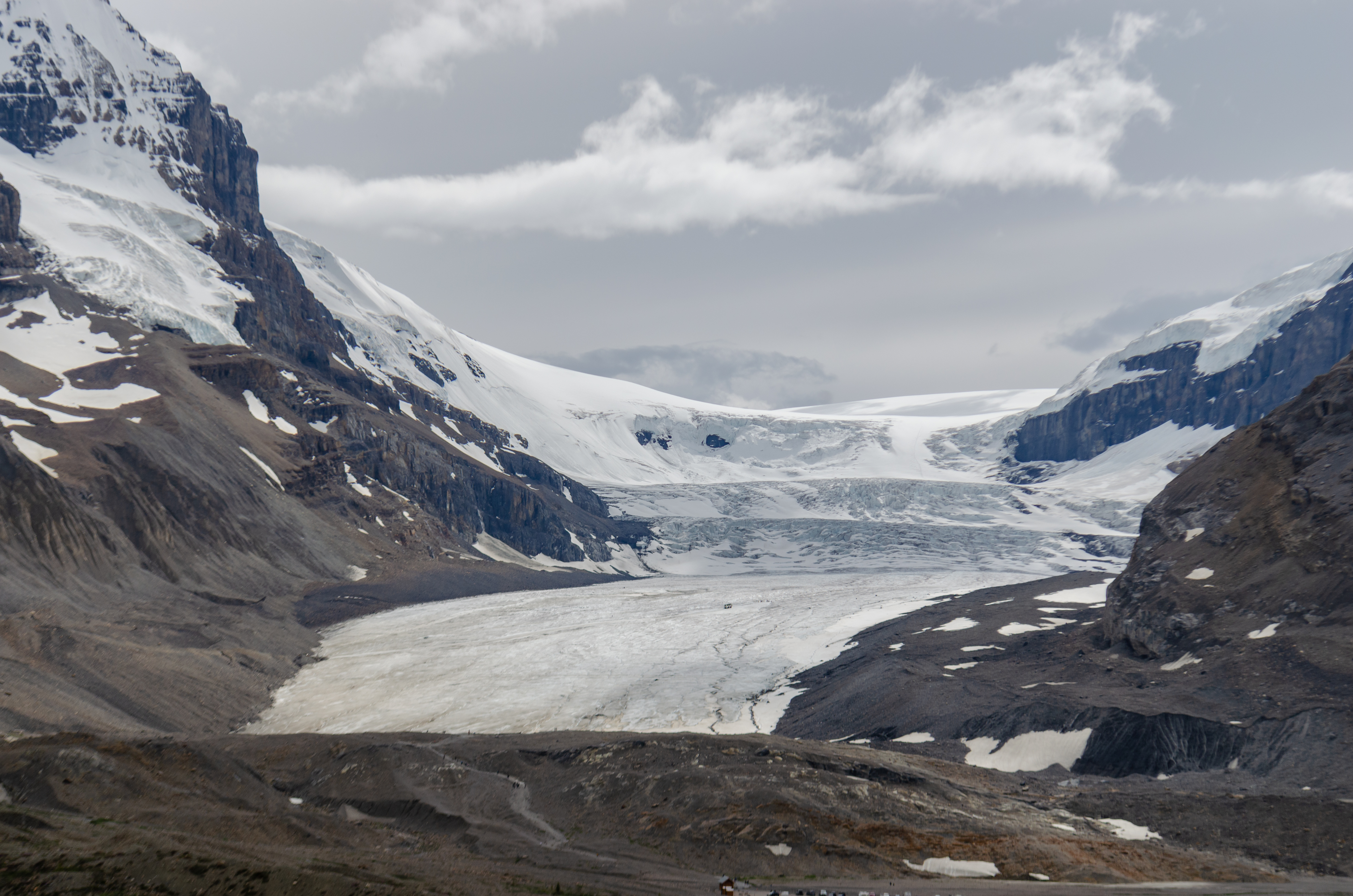
Athabasca Glacier, Jasper National Park, Alberta.

A comprehensive list of glaciers in Canada began with glacial surveys by the Water Survey of Canada (WSC) from 1945 to 1980, including an inventory begun for the International Geophysical Year (1957–58) and contributions to the World Glacier Inventory (WGI, now part of the World Glacier Monitoring Service) for the International Hydrological Decade (1965–1974).

In mainland Canada, glaciers are grouped by the WSC basin system. In the Arctic Archipelago, where the majority of glaciers are unnamed, glaciers are grouped by island with the WSC basin identifier augmented by Scott Polar Research Institute catalogue numbers.

Published in the Glacier Atlas of Canada, the inventory identified 575 glaciers on Bylot Island and 1111 on Axel Heiberg Island.

The following is a list of notable glaciers in Canada.

== List of glaciers ==
=== Saint Elias Mountains ===
- Donjek Glacier
- Hubbard Glacier
- Logan Glacier

=== Coast Mountains ===
==== Boundary Ranges ====
- Juneau Icefield
  - Llewellyn Glacier
- Hang Ten Icefield
- Stikine Icecap
  - Great Glacier
- Andrei Icefield
  - Andrei Glacier
  - Choquette Glacier
  - Hoodoo Glacier
  - Johnson Glacier
  - Porcupine Glacier
  - Twin Glacier
- Salmon Glacier
- Cambria Icefield

==== Pacific Ranges ====
- Monarch Icefield
- Ha-Iltzuk Icefield
  - Klinaklini Glacier
  - Silverthrone Glacier
- Waddington Massif-Pantheon Range-Whitemantle Range
  - Waddington Glacier
  - Tiedemann Glacier
  - Scimitar Glacier
  - Parallel Glacier
  - Franklin Glacier
  - Bell Glacier (Canada)
  - Cannonade Glacier
  - Remote Glacier
  - Shadow Glacier
  - Fan Glacier
  - Geddes Glacier
  - Chaos Glacier
  - Radiant Glacier
  - Cataract Glacier
  - Isolation Glacier
  - Shiverick Glacier
  - Malemute Glacier
  - Sunrise Glacier
  - Tellot Glacier
  - Smoking Cannon Glacier
  - Jambeau Glacier
  - Chanterelle Glacier
  - Yataghan Glacier
  - Jubilee Glacier
  - Chasm Glacier
  - Lemolo Glacier
  - Marvel Glacier
  - Splinter Glacier
  - Dauntless Glacier
  - Cascade Glacier
  - Whitemantle Glacier
- Homathko Icefield
- Lillooet Icecap
  - Lord Glacier
  - Tchaikazan Glacier
  - Stanley Smith Glacier
  - Frank Smith Glacier
  - Bridge Glacier
  - Lillooet Glacier
  - Necwtinoaz Glacier
  - Magaera Glacier
  - Qwilqen Glacier
  - Stalhalam Glacier
- Compton Névé
  - Ring Glacier
- Pemberton Icefield
  - Overseer Icefield
- Ipsoot Icefield
- Powder Mountain Icefield
- Rainbow Glacier
- Plateau Icefield

===== Garibaldi Ranges =====
- Armchair Glacier
- Wedge Glacier
- Spearhead Glacier
- Blackcomb Glacier
- Overlord Glacier
- Spearhead Glacier
- Garibaldi Névé
- Mamquam Icefield
- Misty Icefield
- Stave Glacier
- Snowcap Icefield

===== Lillooet Ranges =====
- Joffre Glacier

===== Cayoosh Range =====
- Place Glacier

=== Vancouver Island Ranges ===
- Aureole Icefield
- Comox Glacier

=== Columbia Mountains ===
==== Purcell Mountains ====
- Bugaboo Glacier
- Commander Glacier
- Durrand Glacier
- Farnham Glacier
- Jumbo Glacier
  - Jumbo Glacier, British Columbia, a resort in the area.
- Macbeth Icefield
- Conrad Icefield

==== Selkirk Mountains ====
- Caribou Glacier
- Kokanee Glacier
- Illecillewaet Névé
  - Illecillewaet Glacier
- Albert Icefield
- Clachnacudainn Icefield
- Gyr Icefield
- Primrose Icefield
- Bonney Névé
- Deville Névé
- Duncan Névé
- Goldstream Névé
- Sonata Névé
- Van Horne Névé
- Woodbury Glacier

==== Monashee Mountains ====
- Serpentine Névé

==== Cariboo Mountains ====
- Braithwaite Icefield

=== Interior Mountains ===
==== Hazelton Mountains ====
- Silvertip Icefield

==== Stikine Plateau ====
- Idiji Glacier – Mount Edziza Provincial Park
- Tenchen Glacier – Mount Edziza Provincial Park
- Tencho Glacier – Mount Edziza Provincial Park
- Tennaya Glacier – Mount Edziza Provincial Park

=== Canadian Rockies (BC/AB) ===
- Angel Glacier – Jasper National Park, Alberta
- Athabasca Glacier – Jasper National Park, Alberta
- Berg Glacier – Mount Robson Provincial Park, British Columbia
- Bonnet Icefield
- Bow Glacier – Banff National Park, Alberta
- Campbell Icefield
- Chaba Icefield
- Clemenceau Icefield
- Columbia Icefield
- Crowfoot Glacier – Banff National Park, Alberta
- Daly Glacier – Yoho National Park, British Columbia
- Dome Glacier – Jasper National Park, Alberta
- Drummond Icefield
- Emerald Glacier – Yoho National Park, British Columbia
- Freshfield Icefield
- Hooker Icefield
- Lloyd George Icefield
- Lyell Icefield
- Mons Icefield
- Mount Brown Icefield
- Hector Glacier – Banff National Park, Alberta
- Peyto Glacier – Banff National Park, Alberta
- Ram Glacier – Banff National Park, Alberta
- Reef Icefield
- Robson Glacier – Mount Robson Provincial Park, British Columbia
- Saskatchewan Glacier – Banff National Park, Alberta
- Vulture Glacier – Banff National Park, Alberta
- Wapta Icefield – Banff National Park, Alberta
- Waputik Icefield – Banff National Park, Alberta
- Washmanwapta Icefield
- Yoho Glacier – Yoho National Park, British Columbia

=== Arctic Archipelago ===
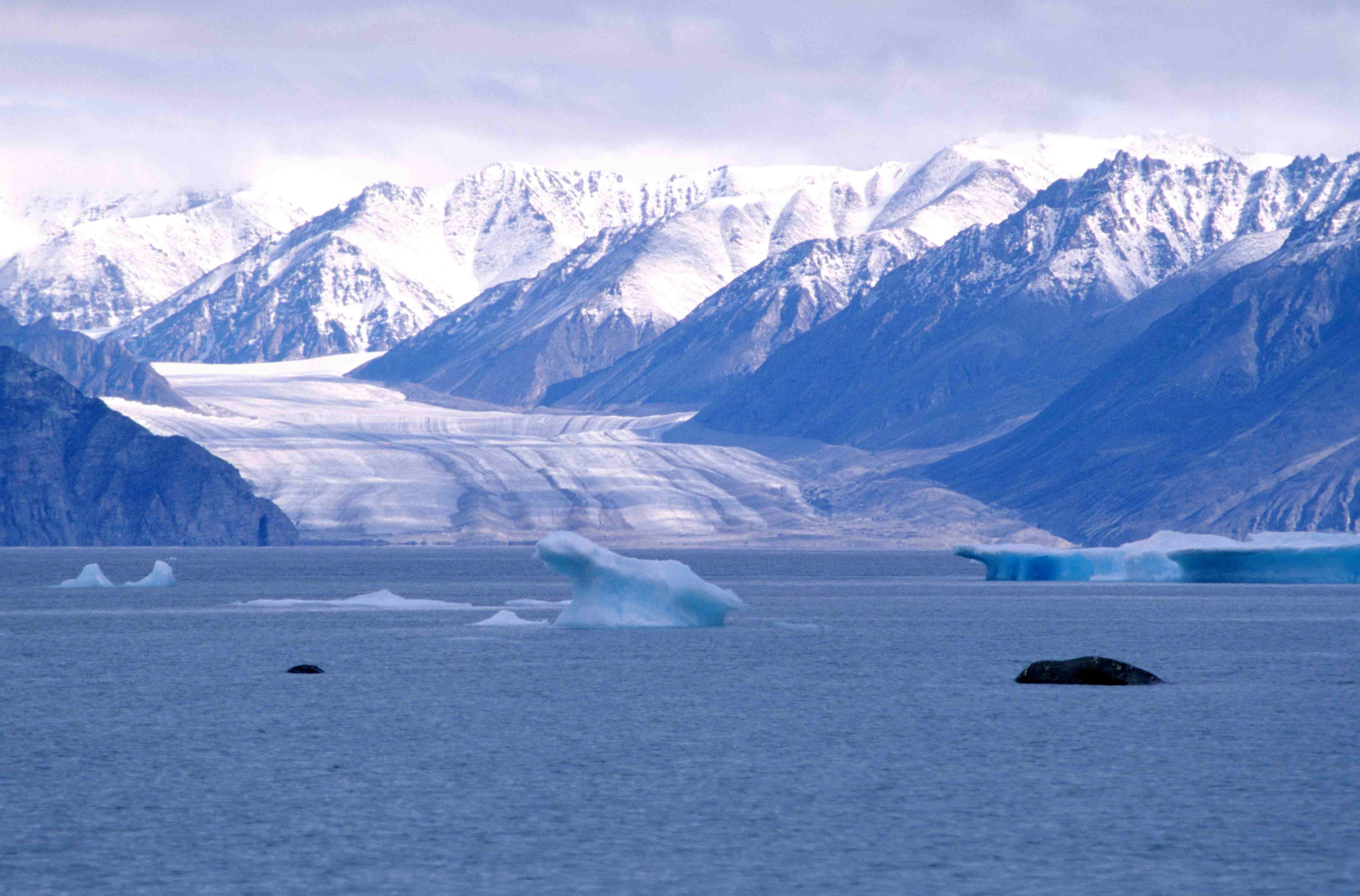
Kaparoqtalik Glacier, Sirmilik National Park, Nunavut

==== Axel Heiberg Island ====
- Müller Icecap
- White Glacier

==== Baffin Island ====
- Barnes Ice Cap
- Coronation Glacier
- Jimi Maasi Glacier
- Keyhole Glacier
- Kiitarayuk Glacier
- Macculloch Glacier
- Nuuksuq Glacier
- Oliver Glacier
- Penny Ice Cap
- Utinatuk Glacier
- West Pioneer Glacier

==== Bylot Island ====
- Aktineq Glacier (B17)
- Kaparoqtalik Glacier (A17)
- Sermilik Glacier (B37)

==== Devon Island ====
- Devon Ice Cap

==== Ellesmere Island ====
- Ad Astra Ice Cap
- Agassiz Ice Cap
- Benedict Glacier
- Chapman Glacier
- Disraeli Glacier
- Eugenie Glacier
- Grant Ice Cap
- Parrish Glacier
- Sven Hedin Glacier
- Turnabout Glacier

==== Melville Island ====
- Melville South Icecap

=== Quebec-Labrador Peninsula (QC/NL) ===
==== Torngat Mountains ====
- Caubvick Glacier

== See also ==
- List of glaciers
