= Sirngmikuluk =

Glacier in the Qikiqtaaluk Region, Nunavut, Canada

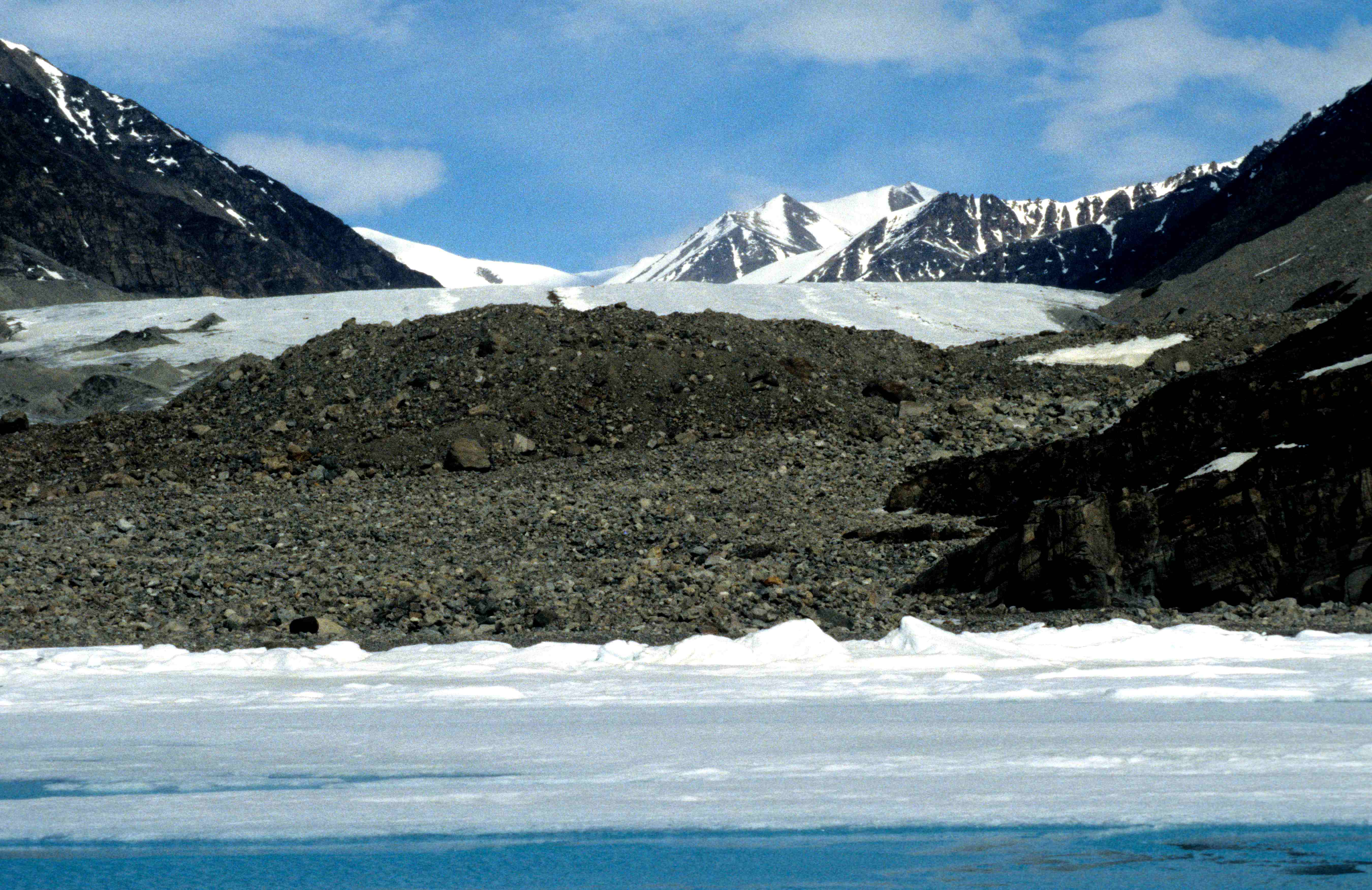
- Sirngmikuluk in the southern Byam Martin Mountains

- Location within Nunavut
- Type: Glacier
- Location: Nunavut, Canada
- Coordinates: 72°54′20″N 077°21′00″W

Sirngmikuluk (Inuktitut syllabics: ᓯᕐᖕᒥᑯᓗᒃ) formerly Narsarsuk Glacier is a glacier in the southeastern Byam Martin Mountains of Bylot Island, Nunavut, Canada.

== See also ==
- List of glaciers in Canada
