= Kilutea River =

Coordinates: 73°16′30″N 81°11′30″W

The Kilutea River is a glacier-fed watercourse on Baffin Island's Borden Peninsula, approximately 20 kilometres (12 mi) long. It flows east and empties into Navy Board Inlet.
