= Magda Plateau =

Plateau in Nunavut, Canada

Coordinates: 72.301°N 82.832°W

The Magda Plateau is an uninhabited plain in Qikiqtaaluk, Nunavut, Canada. It is located in the southern area of Baffin Island's the Borden Peninsula. The plateau's river valleys traverse over scarps and flat-topped hills. Though part of the peninsula is within Sirmilik National Park, the plateau is outside of its boundaries, to the southwest.

The plateau is characterized as being of clay with components of gravel, gneiss pebbles, alluvial deposits. It is bordered on its northern end by steep mountains with the highest elevation approximately 1,300 ft (400 m). Flora includes Eriophorum.
