= Kaparoqtalik Glacier =

Glacier in Nunavut, Canada

Coordinates: 72°55′08″N 77°40′30″W

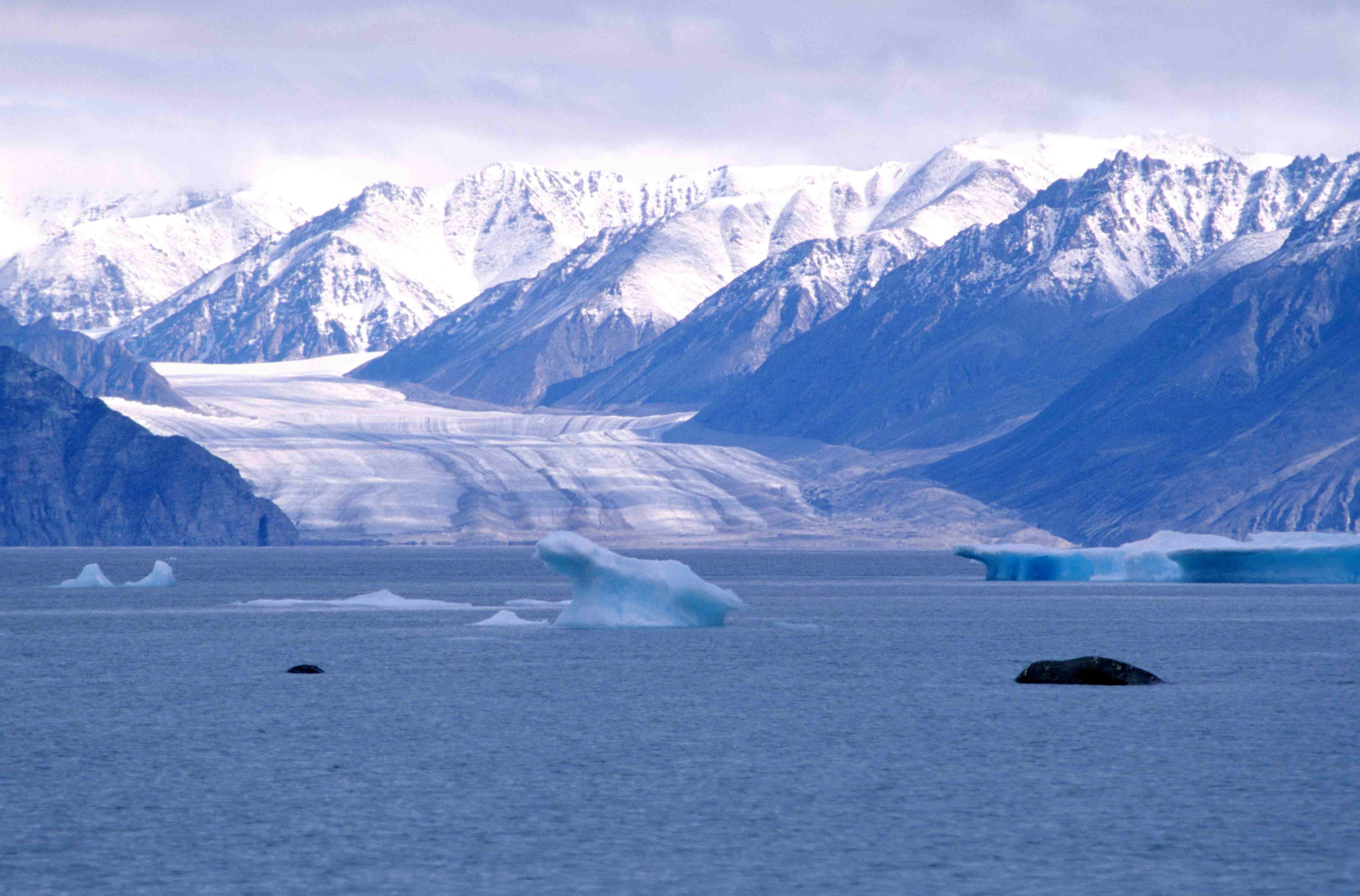
Kaparoqtalik Glacier in the southern Byam Martin Mountains

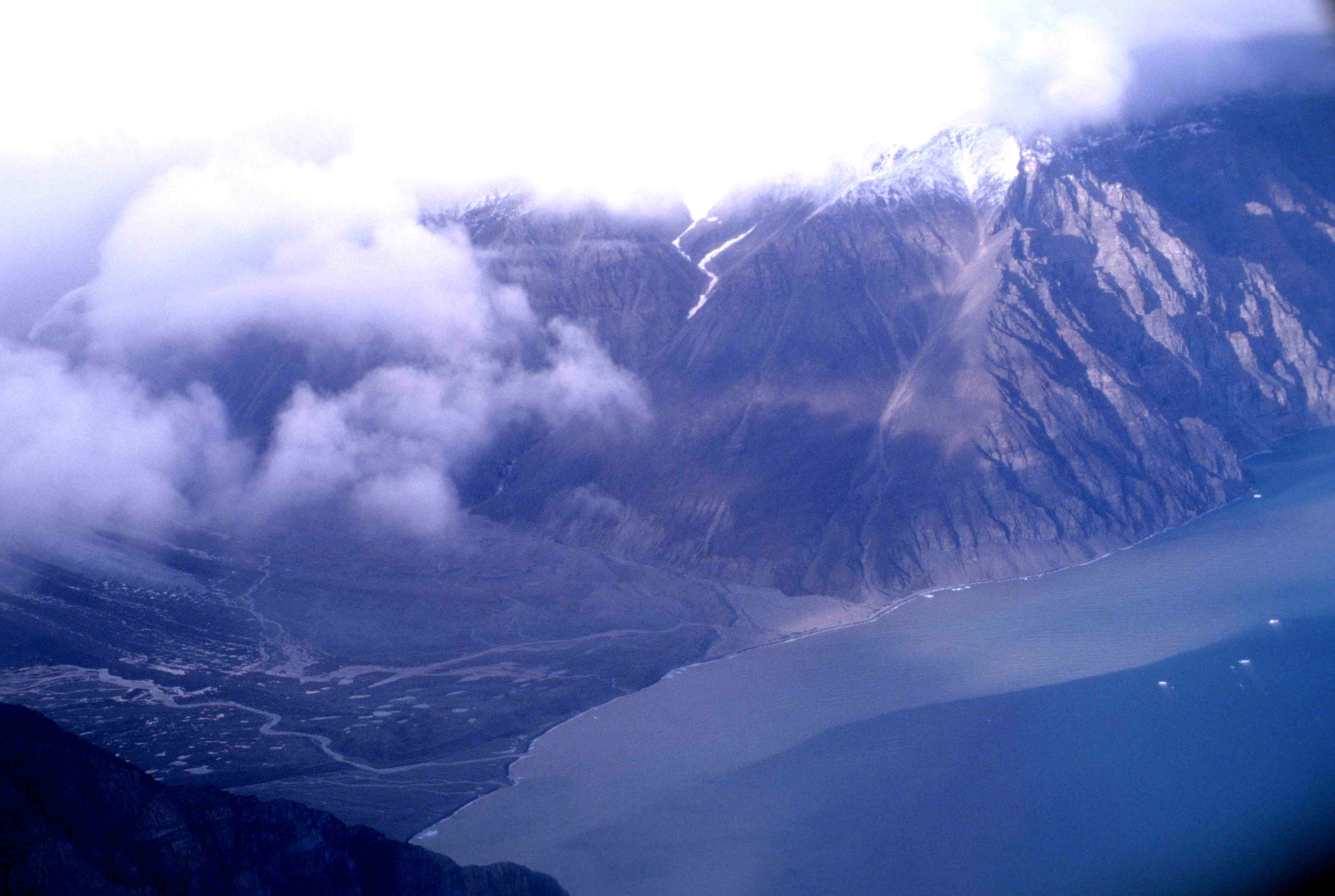
Tip of the tongue of Kaparoqtalik Glacier

Kaparoqtalik Glacier is a glacier located in the southern coast of the Byam Martin Mountains on Bylot Island, Nunavut, Canada. It lies in Sirmilik National Park.

== See also ==
- List of glaciers in Canada
