= Eugénie (disambiguation) =

Eugénie is the French version of the female given name Eugenia.

Eugénie or Eugenie may also refer to:

- Eugénie (1793 ship), a French privateer
- Eugenie (play), by Pierre Augustin Caron de Beaumarchais
- Eugénie Archipelago, in the Peter the Great Gulf of the Sea of Japan
- Eugenie Glacier, on Ellesmere Island, Nunavut, Canada

== See also ==
- Eugénie-les-Bains, a commune in Aquitaine in south-western France
