= Keyway =

Keyway may refer to:

- A part of a keyed joint used to connect a rotating machine element to a shaft; see key (engineering)
- A keyhole, a hole or aperture (as in a door or lock) for receiving a key; see lock and key

== See also ==
- Keyhole (disambiguation)
