= Sermilik Glacier =

Glacier in Nunavut, Canada

Coordinates: 72°54′43″N 078°11′42″W

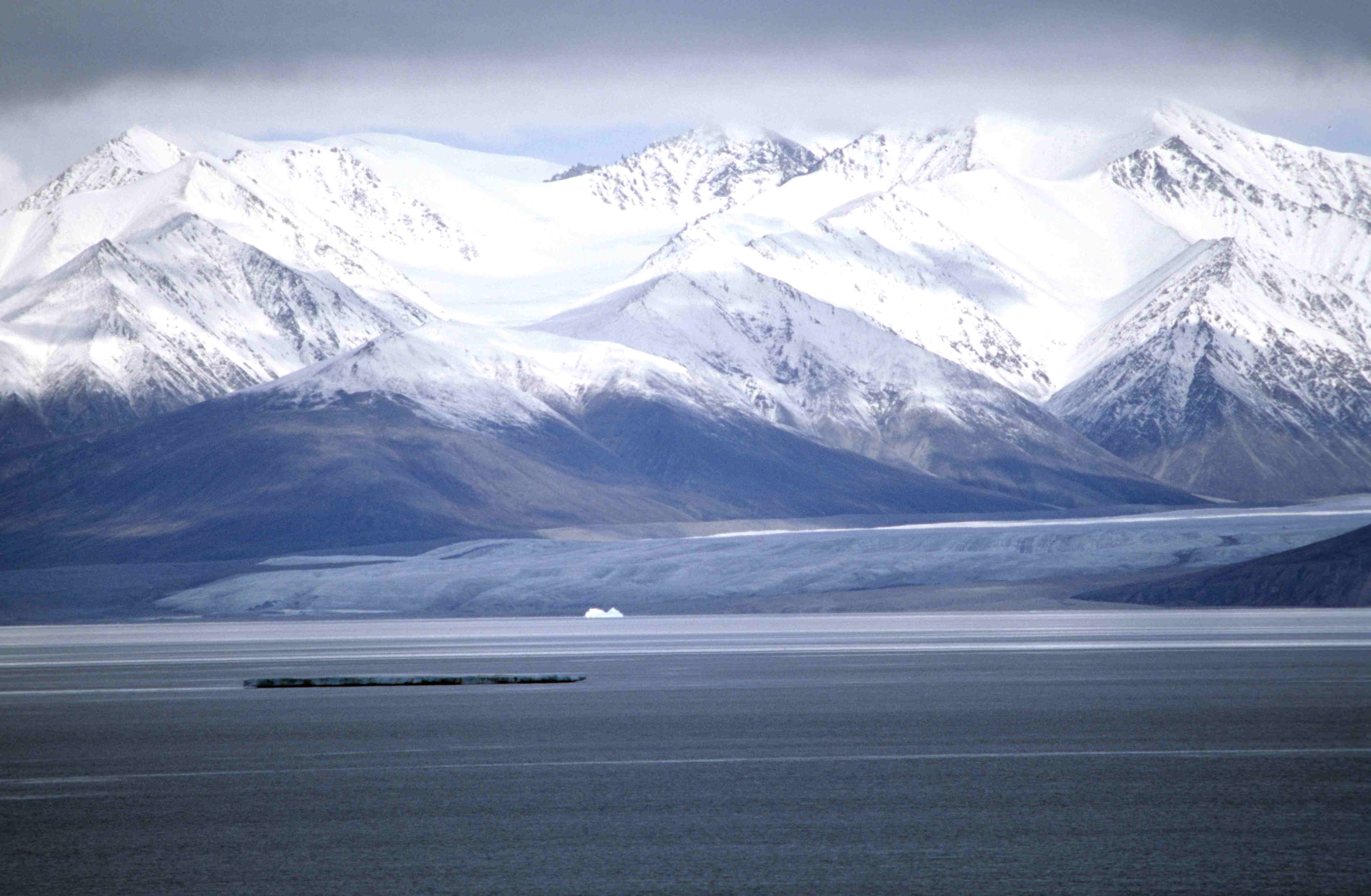
Sirmilik Glacier

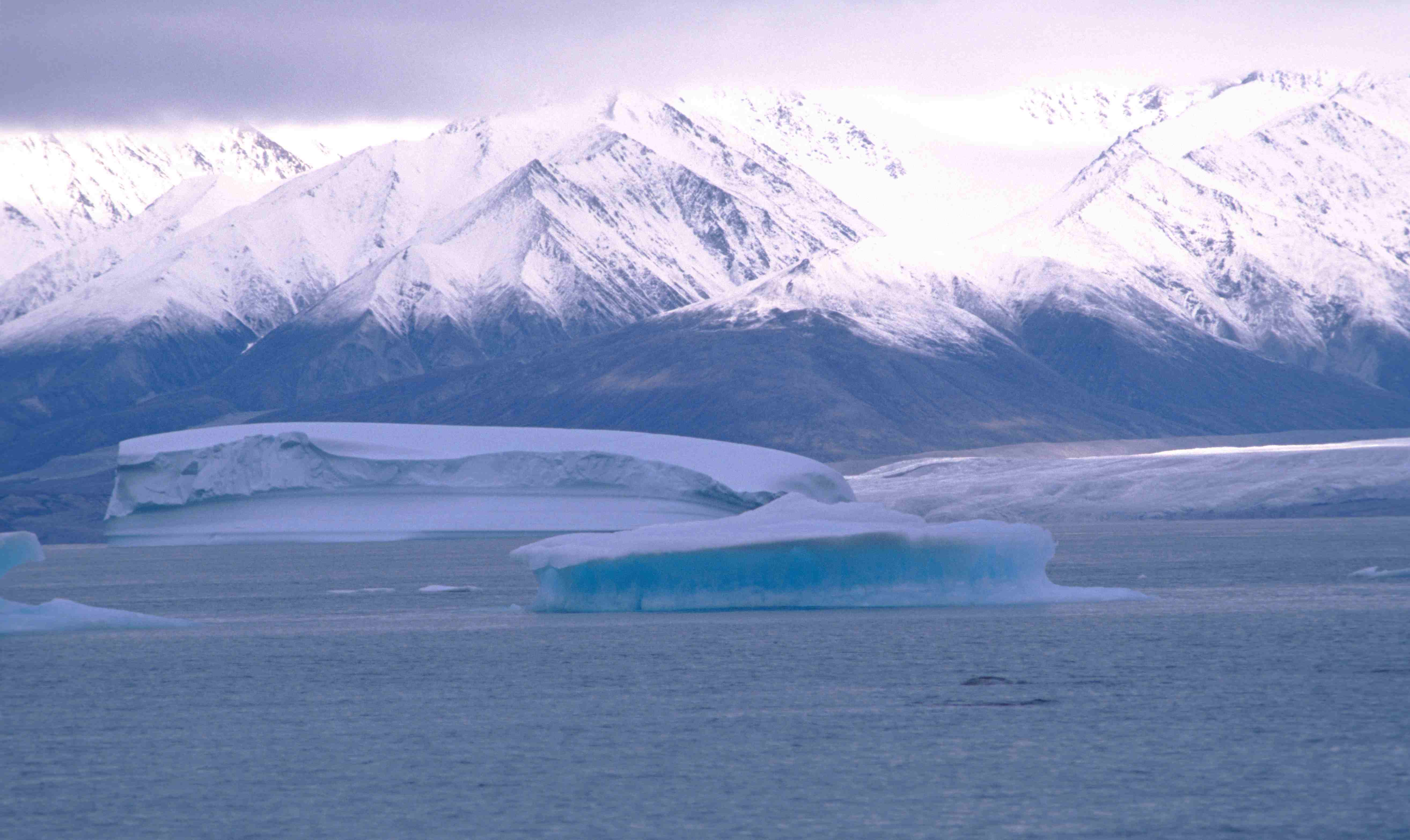
Sirmilik Glacier

Sermilik Glacier is a glacier located in the southern Byam Martin Mountains of Bylot Island, Nunavut, Canada. It lies in Sirmilik National Park.

== See also ==
- List of glaciers in Canada
