= Conger Range =

Mountain range in Nunavut, Canada

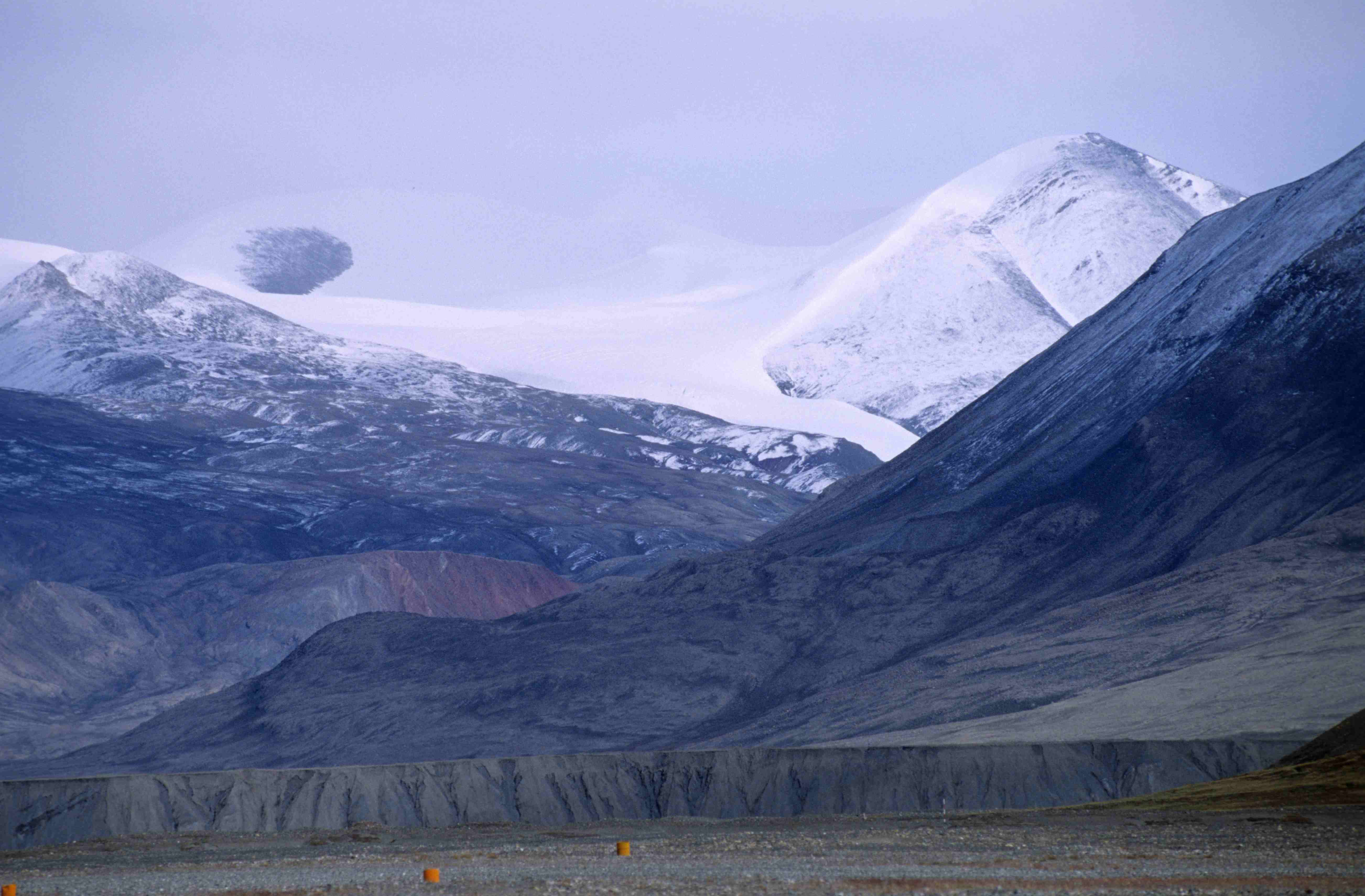
- The Conger Range and Ad Astra Ice Cap

Highest point
- Peak: Mount Biederbick
- Elevation: 1,542 m (5,059 ft)
- Coordinates: 81°33′00.0″N 74°28′01.2″W

Geography
- Location within Nunavut
- Country: Canada
- Region: Nunavut
- Parent range: Arctic Cordillera

The Conger Range, also called the Conger Mountains, is a mountain range in Quttinirpaaq National Park on Ellesmere Island, Nunavut, Canada, beginning about 16 km (10 mi) west of Mount Osborne. It is part of the Arctic Cordillera which is a vast dissected mountain system extending from Ellesmere Island to the northernmost tip of Labrador and northeastern Quebec. The Conger Range is a structural extension of the Garfield Range and continues into the highlands north of the head of Hare Fiord. The overall extent of the range is about 180 km (112 mi). Most of its peaks are ice-covered, although nearly all of the southern slopes are ice-free. Many of the valleys between the peaks are filled with glacial tongues spilling out to the south from the Grand Land Ice Cap. Its highest point is Mount Biederbick at 1,542 m (5,059 ft).

The Conger Range was named by American Polar explorer Adolphus Greely, who sighted them during a dog sledding exploration to the interior of northern Ellesmere Island in 1882.
