= Princess Marie Bay =

Bay in Nunavut, Canada

- Location within Nunavut
- Location: Nares Strait
- Coordinates: 79°20′N 076°00′W
- Ocean/sea sources: Arctic Ocean
- Basin countries: Canada
- Settlements: Uninhabited

Princess Marie Bay is an Arctic waterway in the Qikiqtaaluk Region, Nunavut, Canada. It is located in Nares Strait by eastern Ellesmere Island, and marks the southwestern edge of Cook Peninsula. It is also south of the Sven Hedin Glacier.

== Fauna ==
Its lowland habitat is characterized by wet sedge meadows.

== Exploration ==
Robert Peary's 1898 exploration included this bay.
