= Sven Hedin Glacier =

Glacier in Nunavut, Canada

Coordinates: 79°29′44″N 077°30′15″W

Sven Hedin Glacier is a glacier north of Princess Marie Bay on central Ellesmere Island, Nunavut, Canada. The glacier has the name of Sven Hedin. The Oxford University Ellesmere Land expedition visited the glacier in the year 1935. The Glacier appeared to be advancing in 1935.

== See also ==
- List of glaciers in Canada
