= Keyhole (disambiguation) =

A keyhole is an aperture for receiving a key.

Keyhole may also refer to:

- The Keyhole, a 1933 American film directed by Michael Curtiz
- Keyhole (film), 2011, by Canadian director Guy Maddin
- Keyhole (roller coaster element)
- Keyhole, Inc., a data visualization company acquired by Google
- Keyhole (comics), an alternative comic published in the 1990s
- Keyhole surgery
- Keyhole cichlid, a fish from the genus Cleithracara
- Keyhole button closure, a button, usually found on the back of a woman's blouse
- Keyhole Falls, a waterfall in British Columbia, Canada
- Keyhole Glacier, on Baffin Island, Nunavut, Canada
- A type of cockpit on a kayak or sea kayak
- "Keyhole", a short story by Murray Leinster
- Keyhole race, a speed-based equestrian sporting event

== Space and astronomy ==
- Gravitational keyhole, a region of a large body's orbit that could cause a small body to collide with it
- Keyhole, a region of the sky toward which a telescope cannot point (as in the keyhole problem)
- Keyhole Nebula, another name for the Carina Nebula
- Key Hole (KH), a series of imaging satellites
- The KH-11 KENNEN reconnaissance satellite, codenamed Key Hole
