= Borden Peninsula =

Peninsula in Nunavut, Canada

Coordinates: 72°59′59″N 083°00′00″W

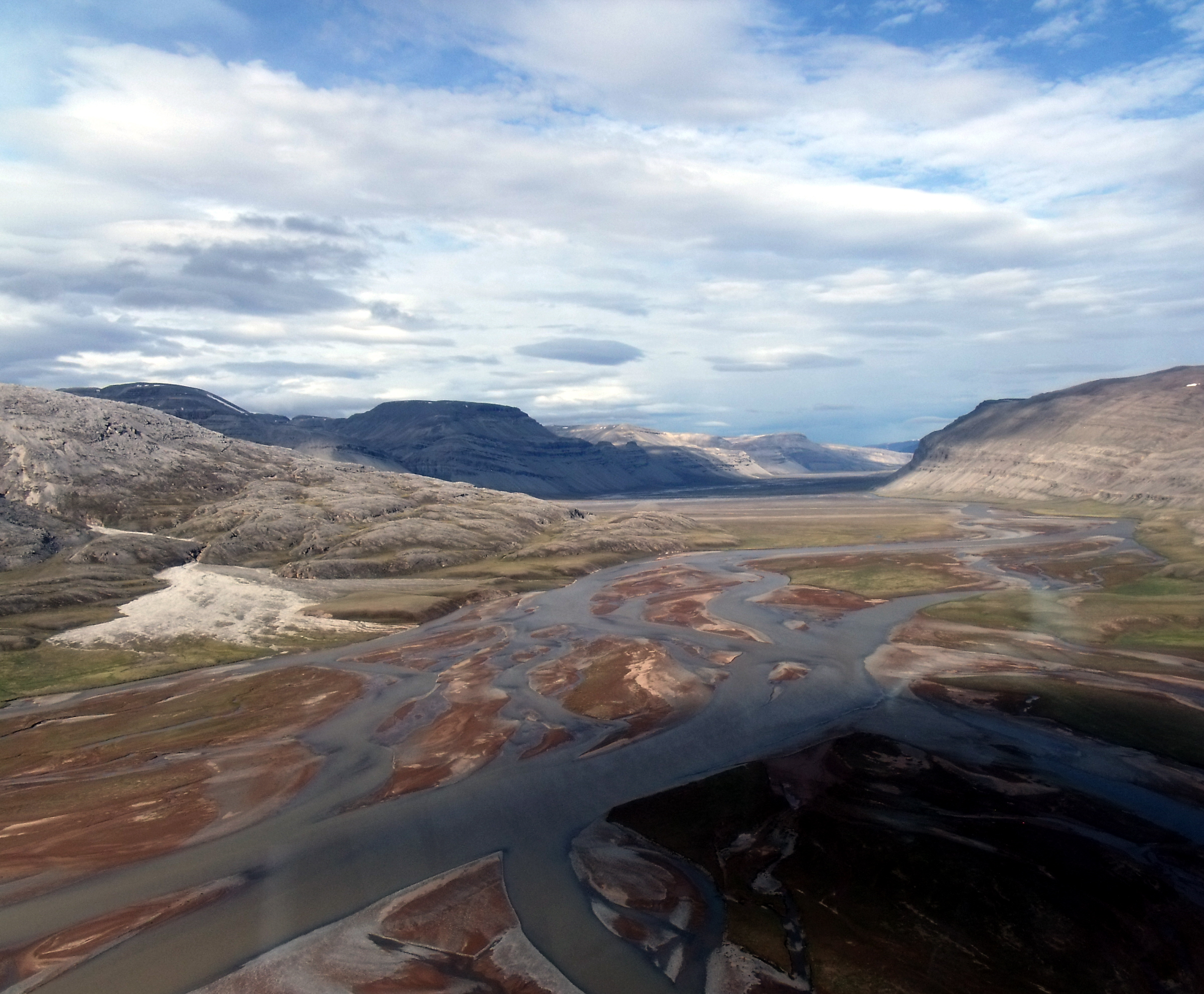
Mid-Borden Peninsula. Erosion of Proterozoic redbeds throws iron stain into Mala River sediments.

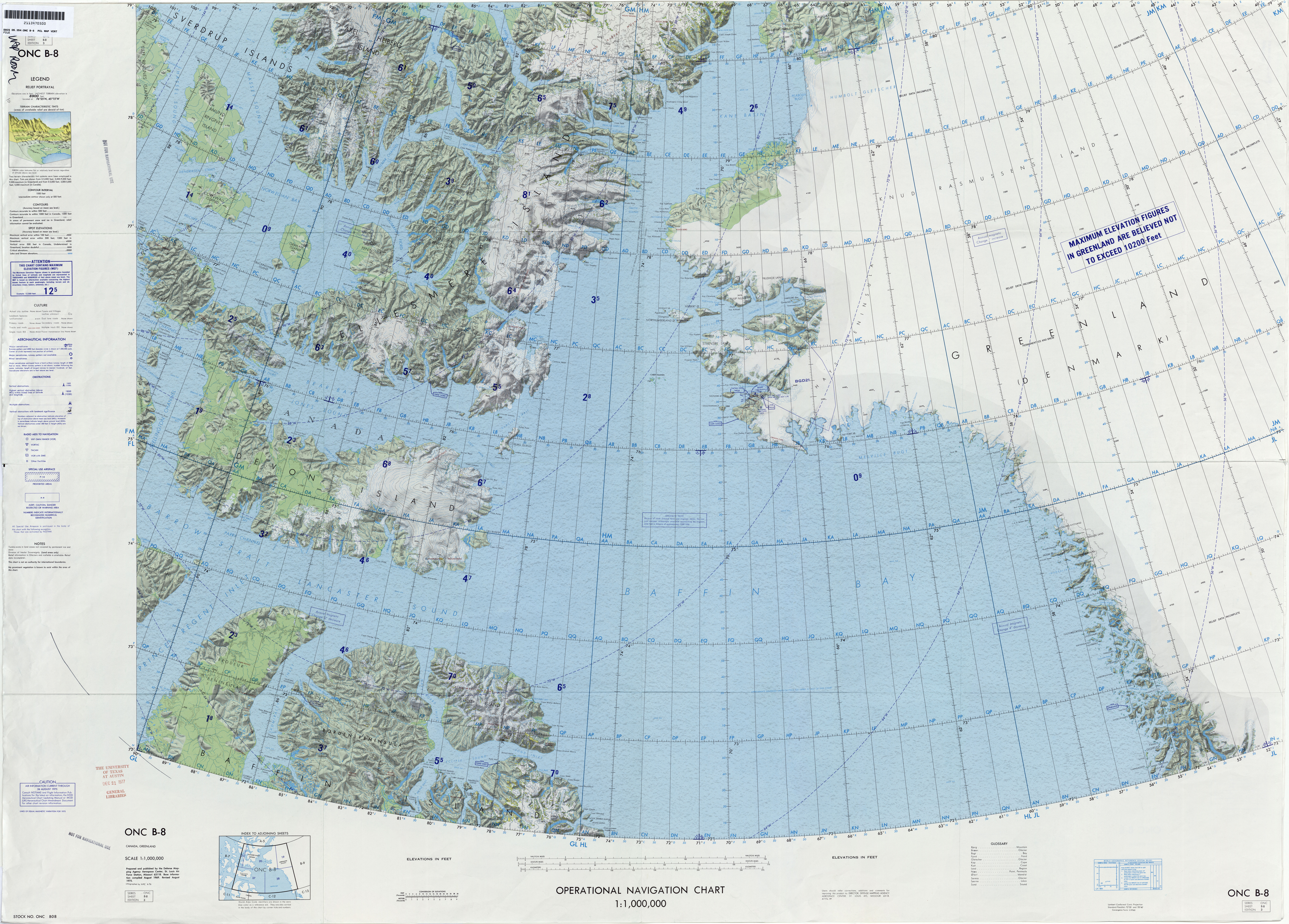
ONC map sheet showing Borden Peninsula

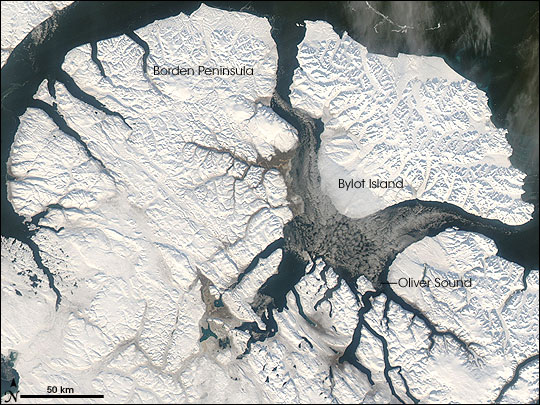
NASA image

Borden Peninsula

The Borden Peninsula is a peninsula on northern Baffin Island, in Nunavut, Canada. It lies some 80 km south of Devon Island (Cape Warrender), from which it is separated by Lancaster Sound. Northeastern Borden Peninsula is home to Sirmilik National Park.

== Geography ==
Borden Peninsula extends north for 225 km (140 mi). It is 64 km (40 mi) - 169 km (105 mi) wide.

The northern area, including the Hartz Mountains, are composed of flat, dissected rock rising to over 914 m (2,999 ft) above sea level. The Magda Plateau is to the south where river valleys occupy the land, dividing scarps and flat-topped hills. 10 to 35 km wide Admiralty Inlet forms a western border, west of which is Brodeur Peninsula. 8 to 20 km wide Navy Board Inlet forms a border to the east, separating the peninsula from Bylot Island. Navy Board Inlet's coastal cliffs rise to 457 m (1,499 ft).

== Population ==
The Inuit community of Arctic Bay is on the western coast.

== Industry ==
The peninsula has seen mining activity for decades, especially for diamonds.
