= Cook Peninsula =

Peninsula in Nunavut, Canada

Coordinates: 79°25′N 077°00′W

The Cook Peninsula is located on the eastern coast of Ellesmere Island, a part of the Qikiqtaaluk Region of the Canadian territory of Nunavut. North of Princess Marie Bay, it stretches eastward into Nares Strait. The peninsula is approximately 64 square kilometres (25 sq mi) in size, and has two lowland areas frequented by muskox.
