= Mount Biederbick =

Mountain in Nunavut, Canada

- Location within Nunavut

Highest point
- Elevation: approx. 1,542 m (5,059 ft)
- Coordinates: 81°33′N 74°28′W

Geography
- Location: Ellesmere Island, Nunavut, Canada
- Parent range: Conger Range
- Topo map: NTS 340D10 Ekblaw Lake

Mount Biederbick is the highest mountain of the Conger Range on Ellesmere Island, Nunavut, Canada. It lies in Quttinirpaaq National Park.
