= Mamquam Icefield =

Ice field in British Columbia, Canada

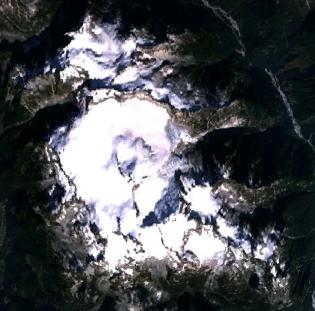
Satellite image of the Mamquam Icefield

The Mamquam Icefield is an icefield in southwestern British Columbia, Canada, located at the headwaters of Skookum Creek. It lies at the southern end of Garibaldi Provincial Park and is one of the southernmost icefields in the Pacific Ranges of the Coast Mountains. The highest summit of the icefield is Mamquam Mountain, located at its southern end with an elevation of 2,588 m (8,491 ft).

== See also ==
- List of glaciers in Canada
- Mamquam River
