= Ad Astra Ice Cap =

Ice cap in Nunavut, Canada

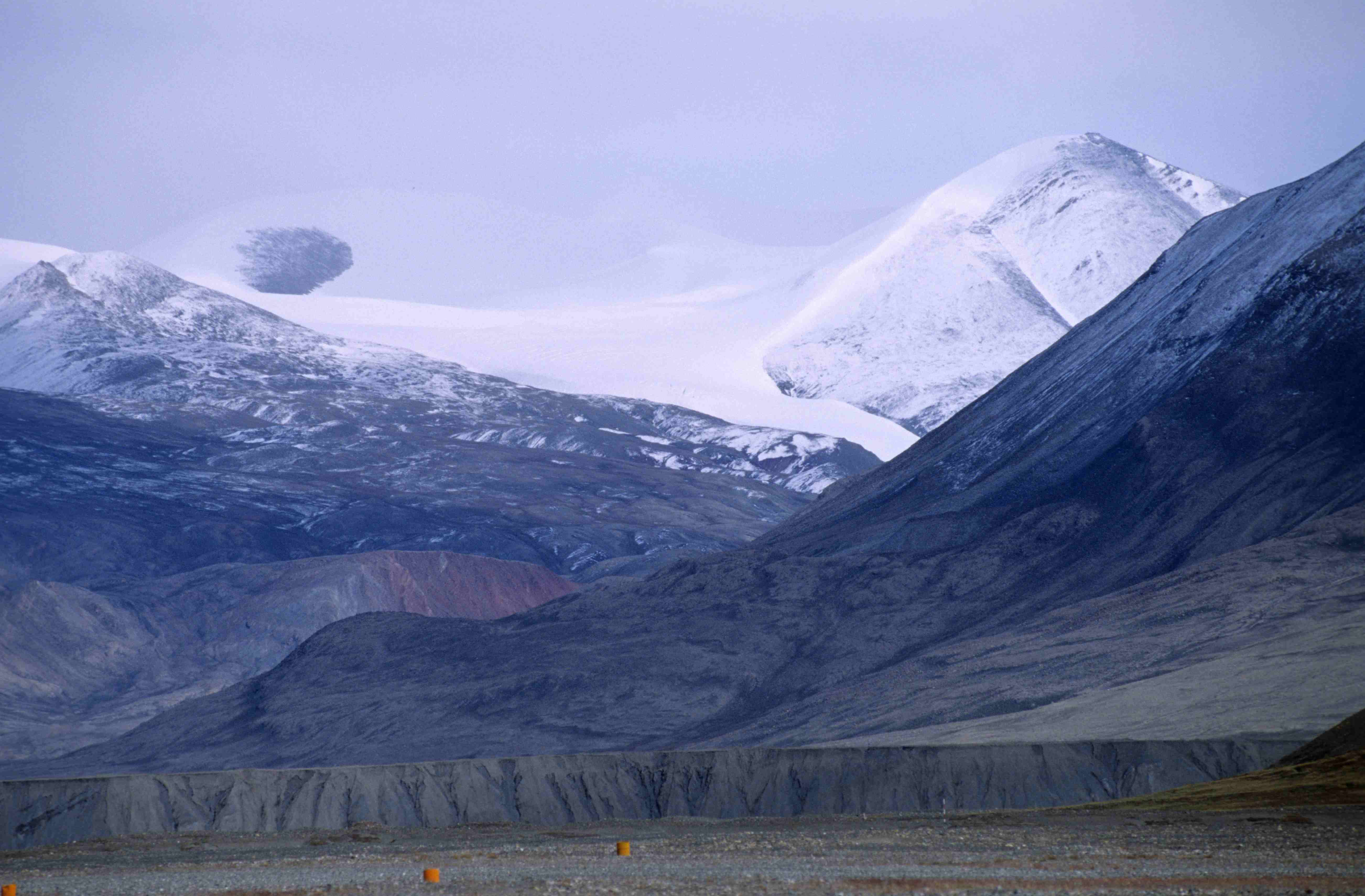
- The Conger Range and Ad Astra Ice Cap

- Location within Nunavut
- Type: Ice cap
- Location: Nunavut, Canada
- Coordinates: 81°35′N 76°17′W
- Status: Retreating

The Ad Astra Ice Cap is an ice cap in Ellesmere Island, Nunavut, Canada. It is located in the Conger Range, north of the head of Tanquary Fiord.

The Ad Astra ice cap has a maximum elevation of 1,676 m (5,499 ft). Mummified wood was found in a valley at the base of the ice cap.

== See also ==
- List of glaciers in Canada
