= Nuuksuq Glacier =

Glacier in Canada

Coordinates: 69°23′35″N 068°25′41″W

Nuuksuq Glacier is a glacier located on the central coast of Baffin Island, Nunavut, Canada.

== See also ==
- List of glaciers
