= Utinatuk Glacier =

Glacier in Nunavut, Canada

Coordinates: 70°20′53″N 070°56′02″W

Utinatuk Glacier is a glacier located on the central coast of Baffin Island, Nunavut, Canada.

== See also ==
- List of glaciers
