= Chaos Glacier (Waddington Range) =

Glacier in the Waddington Range, Canada

- Location within British Columbia
- Interactive map of Chaos Glacier
- Location: Waddington Range
- Coordinates: 51°25′N 125°15′W
- Length: approximately 4 km
- Terminus: tributary of Scimitar Glacier

Chaos Glacier is part of the Waddington Range in the southern British Columbia Coast Mountains in Canada, located at 51°25′25″N 125°15′5″W. It flows to the north from Mount Tiedemann for approximately four kilometers before joining the larger Scimitar Glacier. The name was officially adopted in 1978 from field sketches of the area by mountaineer Don Munday. The area's steep terrain makes this an excellent example of a continuous ice fall.
