= Sirmilik National Park =

National park in Nunavut, Canada

- Parc national Sirmilik
- IUCN category II (national park)
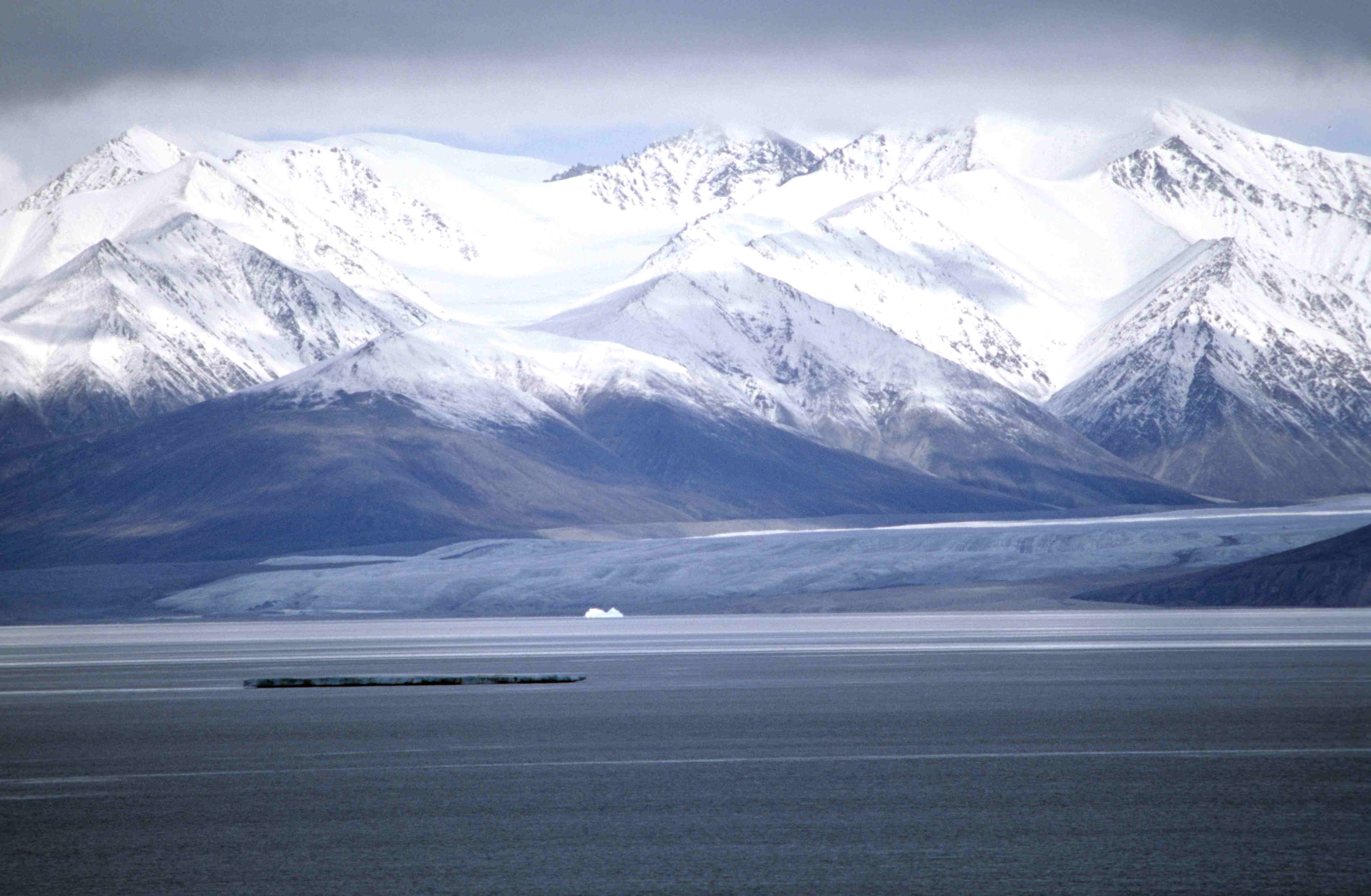
- Sermilik Glacier

- Location within Canada Location within Nunavut
- Interactive map of Sirmilik National Park
- Location: Nunavut, Canada
- Nearest city: Pond Inlet
- Coordinates: 72°59′26″N 81°08′14″W
- Area: 22,200 km^{2} (8,600 sq mi)
- Established: 2001
- Visitors: 6 (in 2022–23)
- Governing body: Parks Canada
- Website: www.pc.gc.ca/en/pn-np/nu/sirmilik

Sirmilik National Park (/ˈsɜːrməlɪk/; Inuktitut: "the place of glaciers") is a national park located in the Qikiqtaaluk Region, Nunavut, Canada, established in 1999. Situated within the Arctic Cordillera, the park is composed of three areas: most of Bylot Island with the exception of a few areas that are Inuit-owned lands, Kangiqłuruluk, and Baffin Island's Borden Peninsula. Much of the park is bordered by water.

Geographically, it is representative of the Northern Eastern Arctic Lowlands Natural Region as well as parts of the Lancaster Sound Marine Region.

== Etymology ==
In Inuktitut, the Inuit language of the area, traditionally spoken across the Eastern Arctic Sirmilik means "place of glaciers", as it represents Bylot Island's plethora of glaciers and ice caps. As Canadian Arctic Inuktitut-speakers referred to northern Baffin Island as Sirmilik, the name of the geographic region became the name of the national park.

== History ==
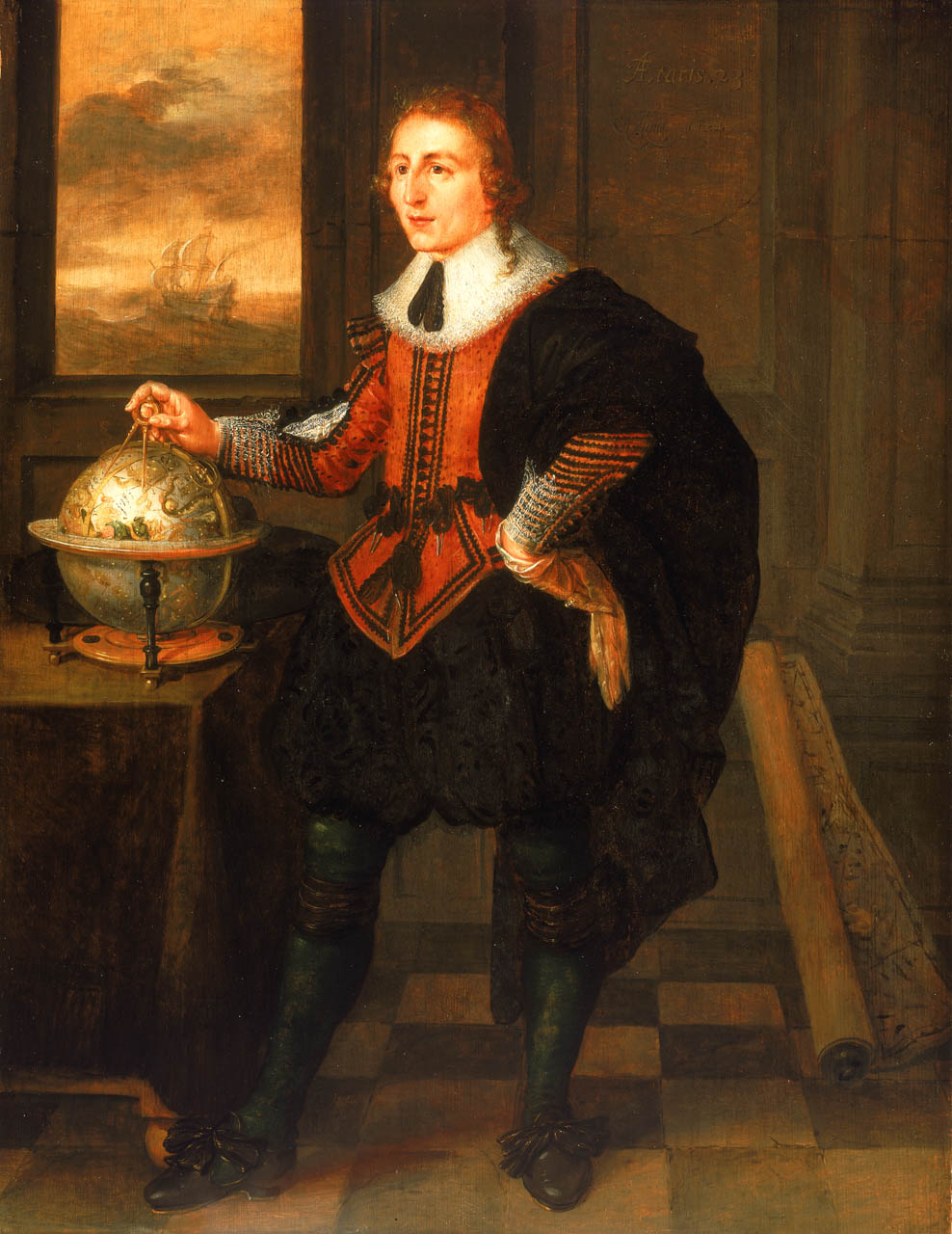
William Baffin who gave his name to Baffin Island and several of the features inside the park

Extensive archaeological exploration of the park area has indicated that the area has been inhabited by humans for thousands of years. The earliest known are predecessors, such as the Paleo-Eskimos, of the modern-day Inuit.

The area was explored by European whalers and by explorers in their search for the Northwest Passage. In the 1610s, the area was surveyed by British explorers William Baffin and Robert Bylot. They named several features of the area including Lancaster Sound and Bylot Island in 1616. It was 200 years before the next official attempt to find the passage through this area. The expedition by the British explorer John Ross in 1818 confirmed the accuracy of Baffin's charts, but ended when he saw what he believed were mountains blocking the end of Lancaster Sound. The area was later thoroughly explored during an extensive aerial mapping program of Northern Canada by the Canadian Government which took from the 1930s until the late 1950s to complete.

The park was first established as a bird sanctuary in 1965 and monitored by the Canadian Wildlife Service because of its seabird colonies. The area officially became a national park in 2001. Today, the area is inhabited by Inuit who continue to hunt and fish as their ancestors did.

The park was the subject of a short film in 2011's National Parks Project, directed by Zacharias Kunuk and scored by Andrew Whiteman, Dean Stone and Tanya Tagaq.

== Geography and climate ==
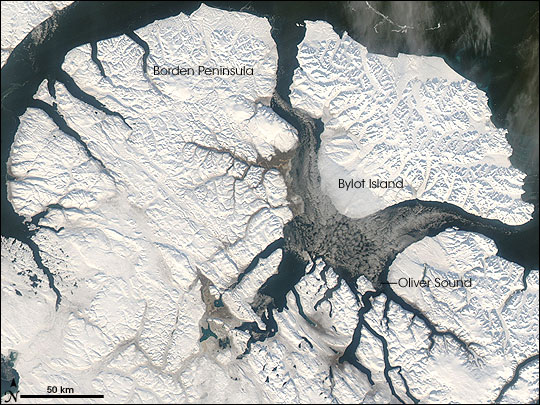
NASA image of the park with the three areas labelled

The park consists of three separate land and marine components. These are Kangiqłuruluk (Oliver Sound), located to the south of Pond Inlet, characterised by a long narrow fjord flanked by towering cliffs and glaciers, the plateau and river valleys of the Borden Peninsula and Baillarge Bay, and finally Bylot Island, characterised by its rough terrain with mountains, coastal lowlands, glaciers, and ice fields. Hoodoos are unique eroded formations on Bylot Island and the Borden Peninsula. Evidence shows that the area was scoured by the Laurentide ice sheet, a massive sheet of ice that covered hundreds of thousands of square miles at least 20,000 years ago.

The Borden Peninsula extends north for 225 km (140 mi) and is 64 km (40 mi) – 169 km (105 mi) wide. The northern area, including the Hartz Mountains, are composed of flat, dissected rock rising to over 914 m (2,999 ft) above sea level. Admiralty Inlet forms a western border, with Elwin Inlet also to the west, while Navy Board Inlet forms a border to the east, separating the peninsula from Bylot Island. Navy Board Inlet's coastal cliffs rise to 457 m (1,499 ft).

Bylot Island lies off the northern end of Baffin Island and with an area of 11,067 km^{2} (4,273 sq mi), it is ranked 70th largest island in the world and Canada's 17th largest island. It is also one of the largest uninhabited islands in the world. While there are no permanent settlements on this island in the Arctic Archipelago, Inuit from Pond Inlet and elsewhere regularly travel to Bylot Island. An Inuit seasonal hunting camp is located southwest of Niaqunnguut (Cape Graham Moore). The Byam Martin Mountains extend from east to west across Bylot Island and are an extension of the Baffin Mountains which in turn form part of the Arctic Cordillera mountain system. The highest mountain in the range is Angilaaq Mountain, 1,951 m (6,401 ft), located near the island's centre. The Byam Martin Mountains are made up of Archean-Aphebian igneous crystalline rock and Proterozoic metasedimentary and metamorphic rock, such as gneiss. Sharp peaks and ridges, divided by deep glacier-filled valleys are typical features in the range and has been extensively modified by glacial erosion. Extensive glaciers dot the island including the Kaparoqtalik Glacier. Vertical cliffs along the coastline are made up of Precambrian dolomite. The island's north shore faces Lancaster Sound, a polar bear maternity den area, also noted for its high concentrations of marine wildlife. To the northeast of the park is Baffin Bay and to the south lies Pond Inlet and Eclipse Sound.

In the north of Baffin Island, there is a polar maritime climate which means long, cold winters and short, cool summers. The spring does not end until mid-June and the warmest period is late July and early August, with average maximum temperatures of 10 °C (50 °F). The coldest month is January as the average maximum temperatures of about −30 °C (−22 °F). Rainfall is relatively abundant, contributing to the flora seen in the park.

== Fauna and flora ==
Fauna

Beluga whales, Arctic foxes, seals, Arctic hares, walruses, and caribou are found in this park. Bylot Island is a migratory area for narwhals. Sirmilik is one of eight Canadian national parks that contains polar bears. Arctic wolves roam and inhabit this park.

A major seabird colony is located in the area of Baillarge Bay. Seabird colonies are also located on Bylot Island which have a large colony and nesting area of greater snow geese. More than seventy species of birds have been recorded here, of which about forty are known to breed. The park is known to be an important bird sanctuary. In 1965, Bylot Island enclosed within the park was also declared as a "Migratory Bird Sanctuary" in view of the large number of migratory birds in the area. A record 100,000 birds are reported to pass the park during summer months every year, and the large geese population of the island is known to constitute the most abundant herbivores of the island. On some of Bylot Island's rugged cliffs within the park, thousands of nesting birds can be found including 300,000 thick-billed murre and 80,000 black-legged kittiwake.

Flora

The wetlands of the park (10% of the area) have abundant vegetation of water sedge (Carex aquatilis), white cottongrass (Eriophorum scheuchzeri) and tall cottongrass (Eriophorum angustifolium). Other types of grass include the Fisher’s tundragrass (Dupontia fisheri), the polar grass (Arctagrostis latifolia) and semaphore grass (Pleuropogon sabinei). In addition, several species of brown moss have been recorded. In the Arctic environment of the southern part of the island 360 species of plants have been documented, which are considered to have rare quality and productivity.

Vegetation in the upland (on hill slopes and terraces) which constitute 90% of southern drier areas of the park consist of forbs, such as Arctic heather (Cassiope tetragona), mountain avens (Dryas integrifolia), Arctic poppy (Oreomecon radicata) and mountain sorrel (Oxyria digyna), grasses, such as polar grass (Arctagrostis latifolia), northern foxtail (Alopecurus alpinus), bluegrass (Poa arctica) and northern wood rush (Luzula confusa) and shrubs, such as Arctic willow (Salix arctica) and northern bilberry (Vaccinium uliginosum).

== Gallery ==
Sirmilik National Park
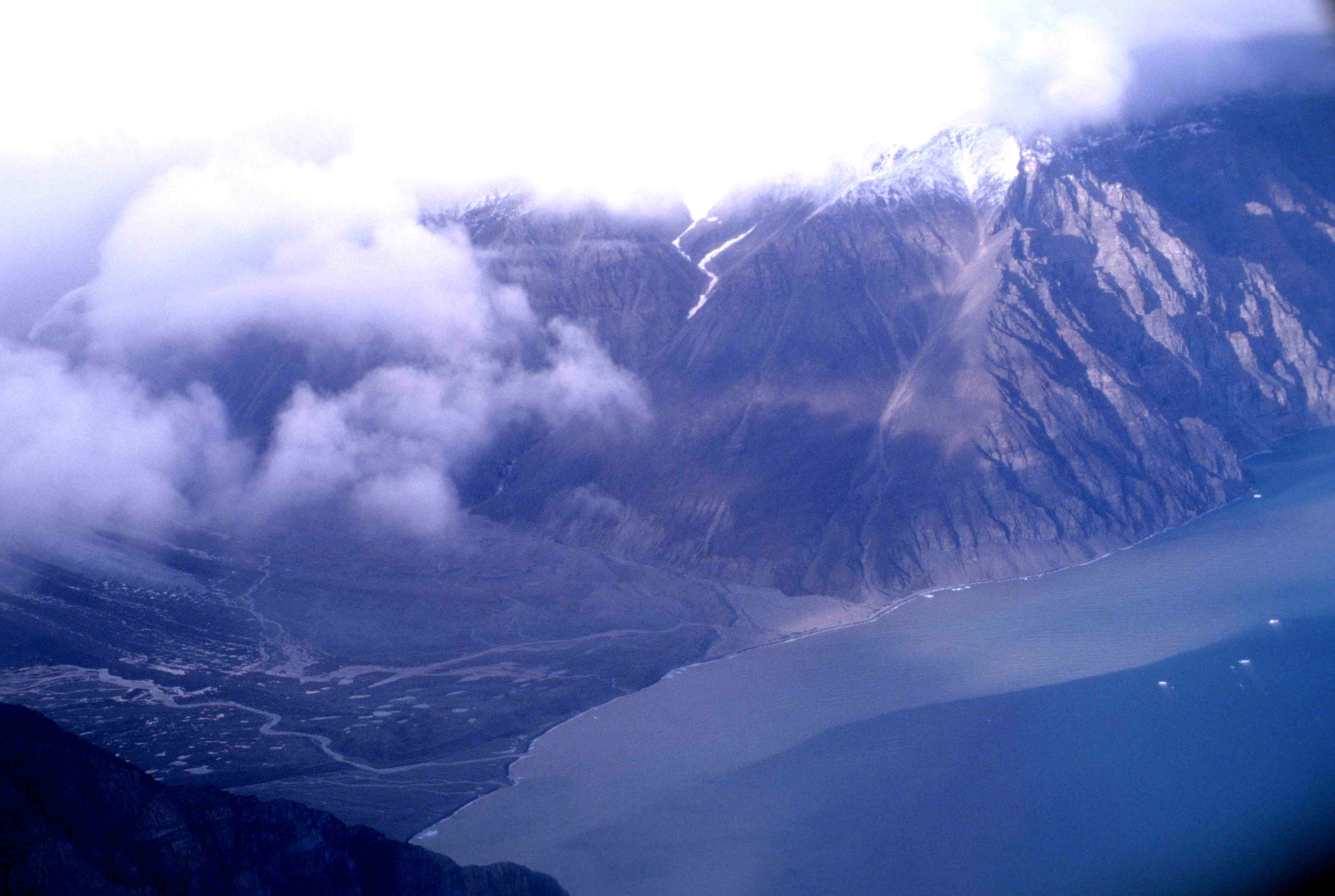
Bylot Island

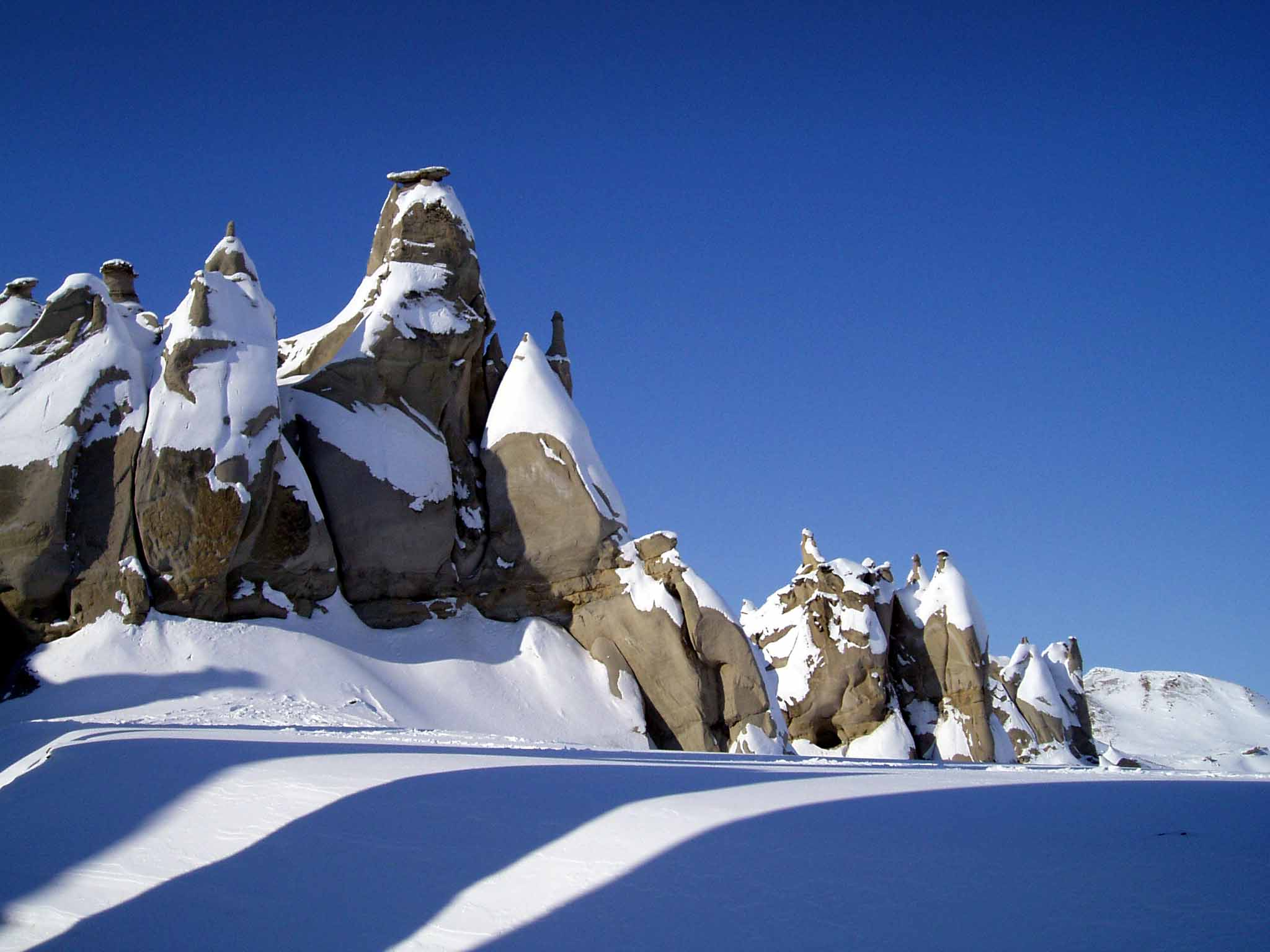
Hoodoos on Bylot Island north of Pond Inlet

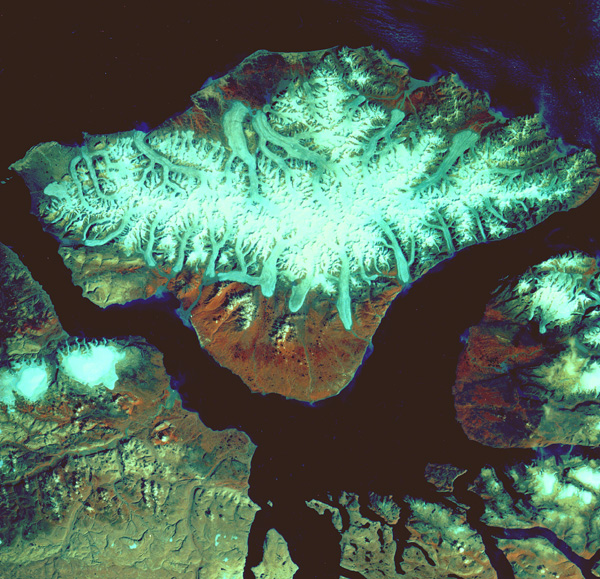
NASA image of Bylot Island

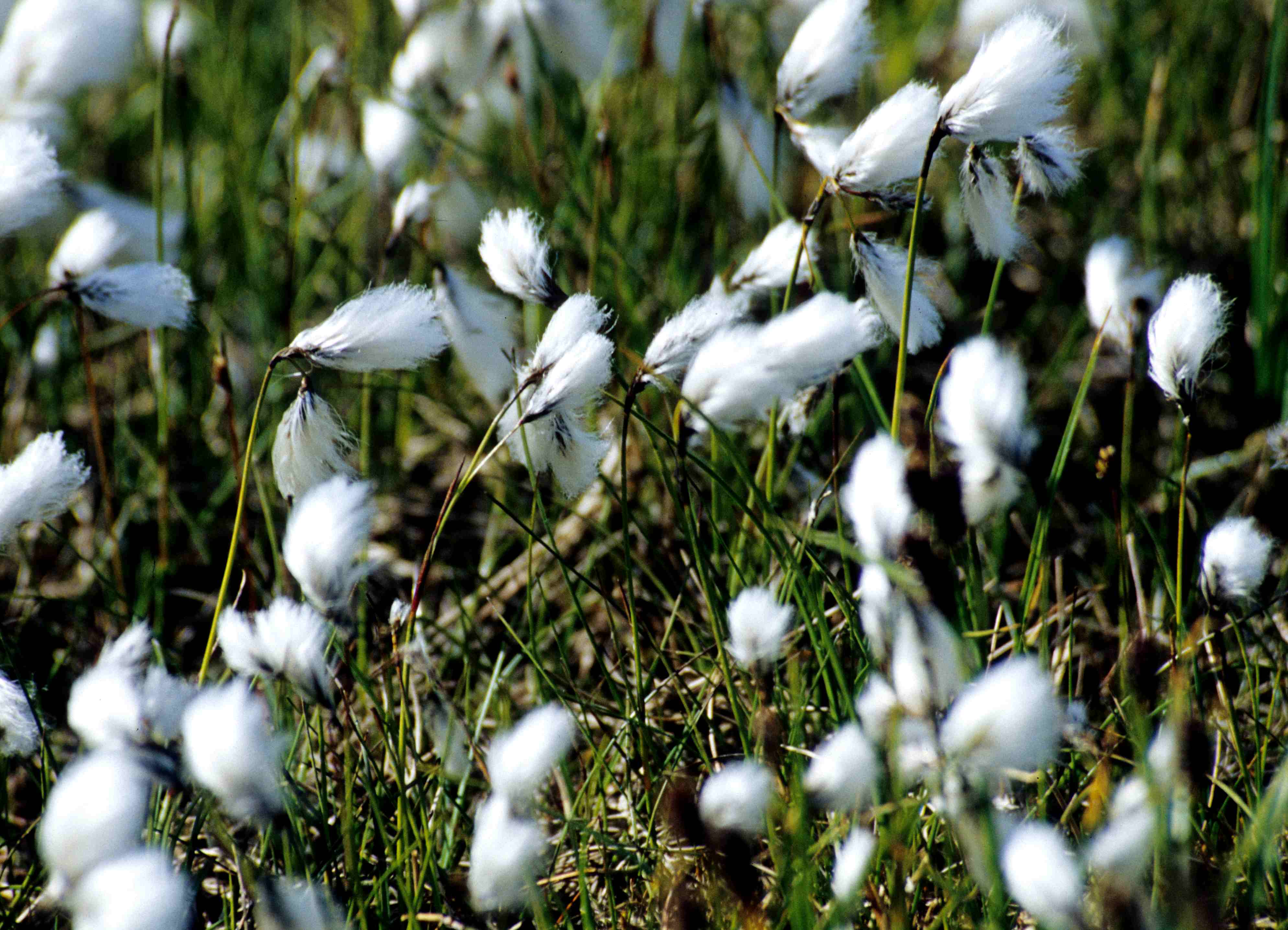
Eriophorum angustifolium

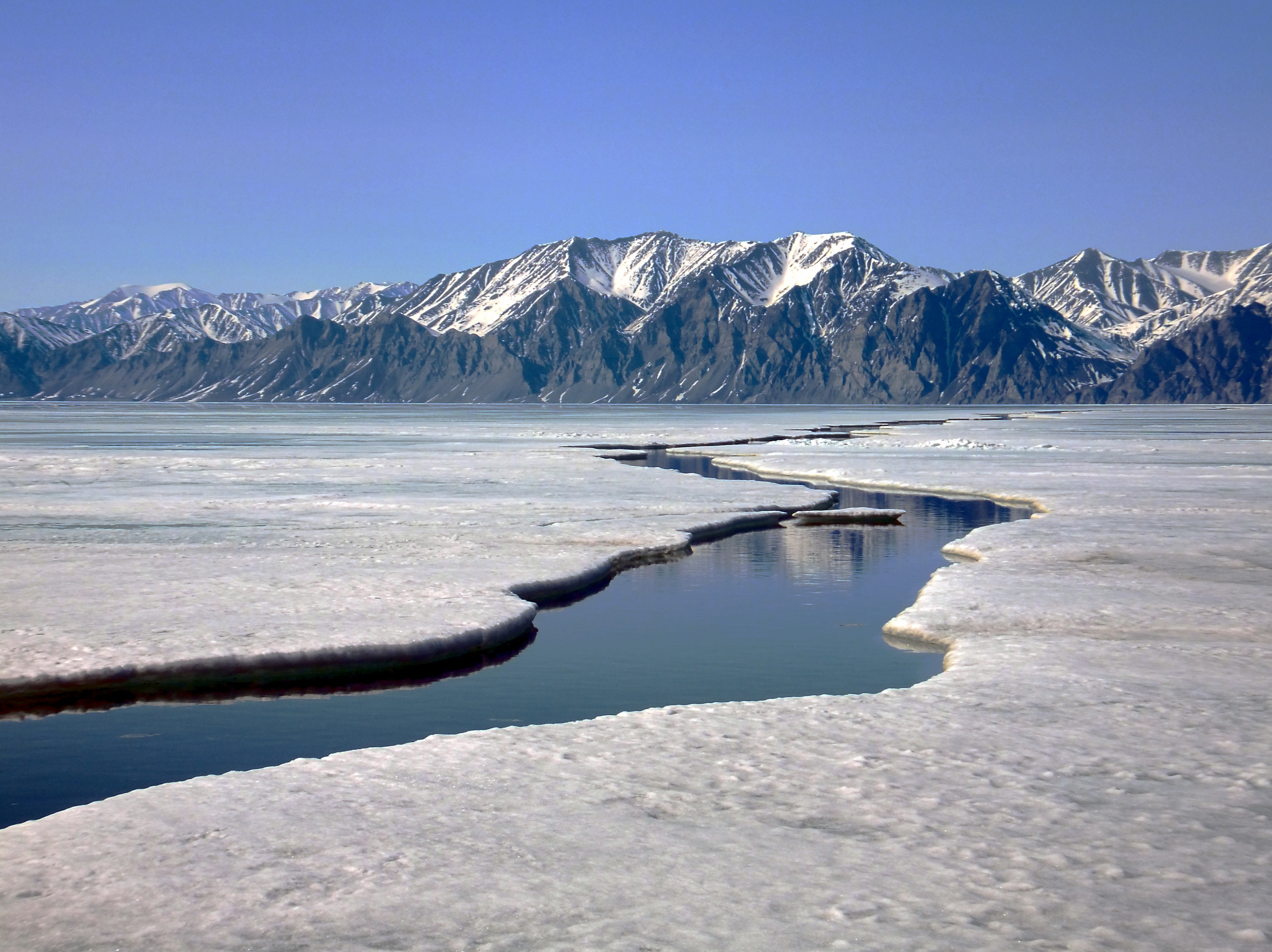
Bylot Island

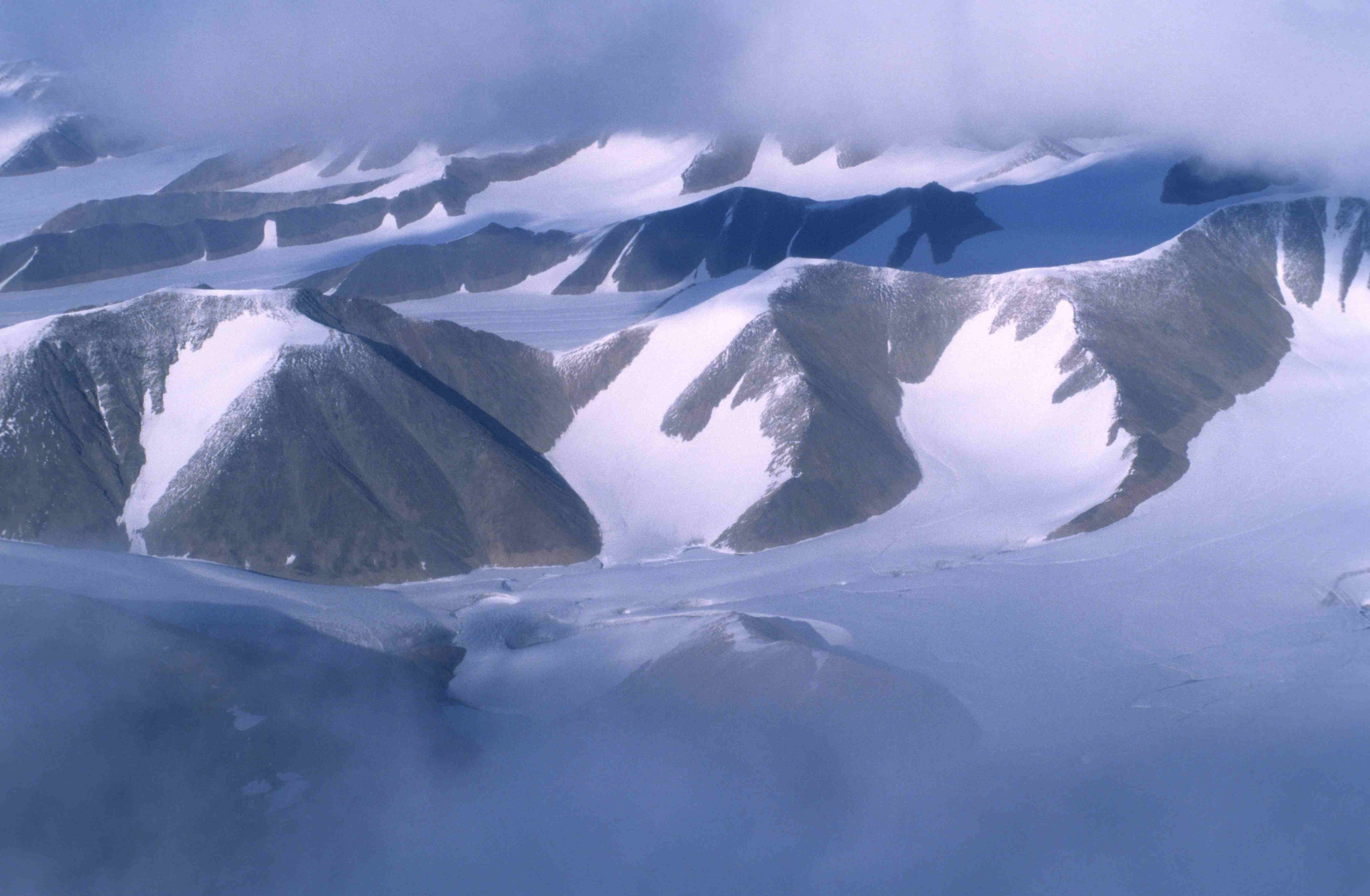
Byam Martin Mountains

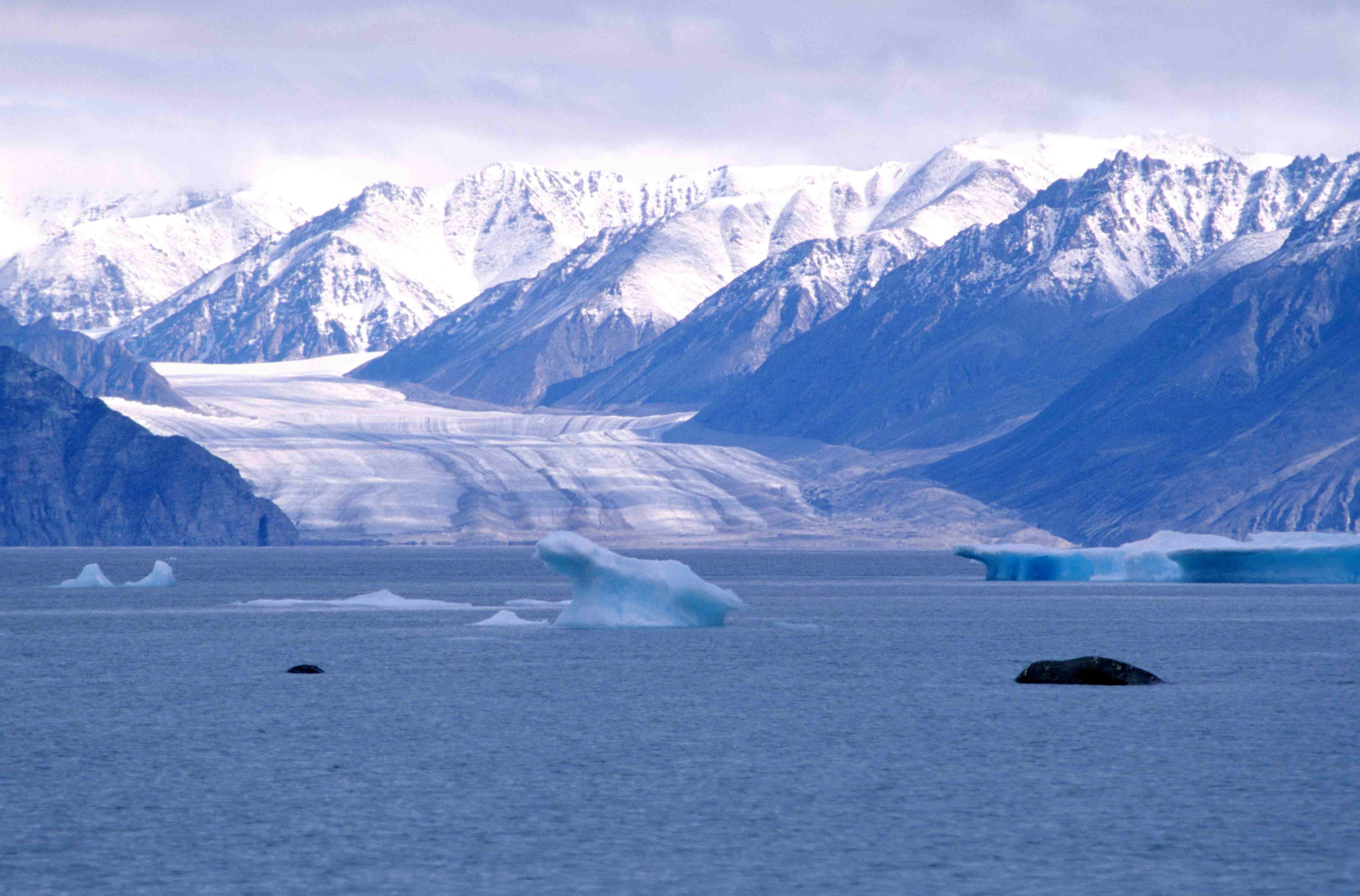
Kaparoqtalik Glacier

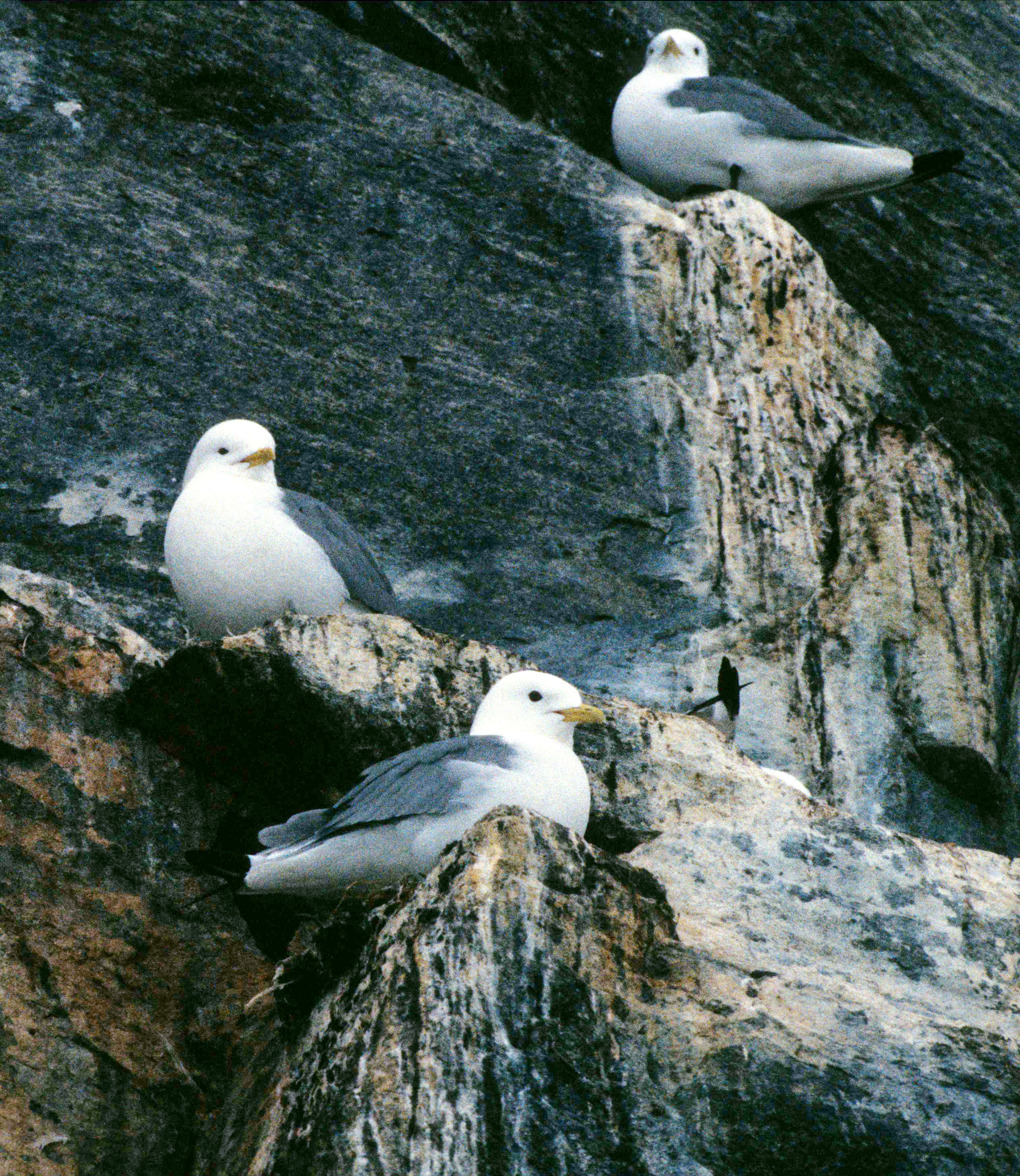
Kittiwakes on the cliffs of Niaqunnguut (Cape Graham Moore)

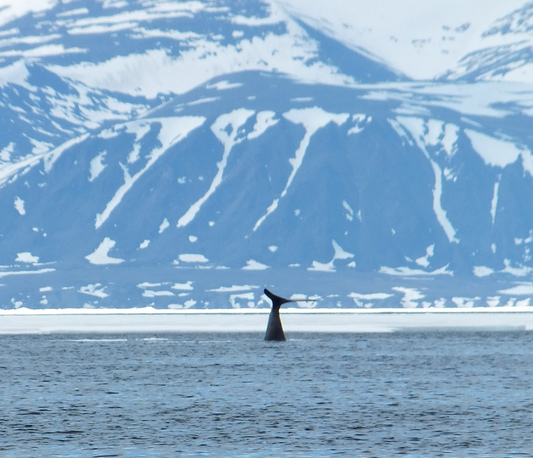
Bowhead whale tail-slaps in a distance

== See also ==
- List of national parks of Canada
- List of protected areas of Nunavut
