= Jimi Maasi Glacier =

Glacier in Nunavut, Canada

Coordinates: 72°27′40″N 076°03′47″W

Jimi Maasi Glacier is a glacier in northeastern Baffin Island, Nunavut, Canada.

== See also ==
- List of glaciers
