= Kiitarayuk Glacier =

Glacier in Nunavut, Canada

Coordinates: 69°27′14″N 68°40′41″W

Kiitarayuk Glacier is a glacier located on the central coast of the Baffin Mountains on northeastern Baffin Island, Nunavut, Canada.

== See also ==
- List of glaciers
