= Parallel Glacier =

Glacier in British Columbia, Canada

- Location within British Columbia
- Location: Waddington Range
- Coordinates: 51°27′N 125°17′W

Parallel Glacier is part of the Waddington Range in the southern British Columbia Coast Mountains. It is a small alpine glacier on the north side of Umbra Ridge (51°27'05''N, 125°17'35''W). It extends to the northeast from Mount Geddes toward Pocket Valley.
