= Macculloch Glacier =

Glacier in Nunavut, Canada

Coordinates: 72°21′28″N 075°42′18″W

Macculloch Glacier is a glacier located in the northeastern coast of the Baffin Mountains on Baffin Island, Nunavut, Canada.

== See also ==
- List of glaciers
