= West Pioneer Glacier =

Glacier in Nunavut, Canada

Coordinates: 70°26′54″N 070°50′09″W

West Pioneer Glacier is a glacier located on the central coast of Baffin Island, Nunavut, Canada.
