= Angilaaq Mountain =

Mountain in Nunavut, Canada

- Location within Nunavut

Highest point
- Elevation: 1,951 m (6,401 ft)
- Prominence: 1,951 m (6,401 ft)
- Listing: Canada most prominent peak 45th; Canada most isolated peaks 41st
- Coordinates: 73°13′42″N 78°37′15″W

Geography
- Location: Bylot Island, Nunavut, Canada
- Parent range: Byam Martin Mountains
- Topo map: NTS 38C3 Mount Mitima

Angilaaq Mountain is a mountain in Qikiqtaaluk Region, Nunavut, Canada. It is located 62 km (39 mi) north of Pond Inlet. It is the highest mountain on Bylot Island and lies in the Byam Martin Mountains, which is a northern extension of the Baffin Mountains.

== See also ==
- List of Ultras of North America
