= Hartz Mountains (Nunavut) =

Mountain range on Baffin Island, Canada

Highest point
- Coordinates: 73°30′0″N 83°0′0″W

Geography
- Country: Canada
- Region: Nunavut
- Parent range: Arctic Cordillera

The Hartz Mountains are a mountain range on Baffin Island, Nunavut, Canada. It is located in Sirmilik National Park which is Baffin Island's northernmost national park. It makes up part of the Arctic Cordillera mountain system.

== See also ==
- List of mountain ranges
