= Hang Ten Icefield =

Glacier in British Columbia, Canada

Coordinates: 58°52′30″N 133°43′00″W

The Hang Ten Icefield is a glacier located in the province of British Columbia in Canada. The icefield is mountainous to the west, but becomes more hilly as one approaches the east. The highest point in the icefield is Devils Paw. The area around the Hang Ten Icefield is extremely sparsely populated, with the population averaging under two people per square kilometre. There are also no communities in the vicinity. The icefield is a part of the Boreal Climate Zone. The area surrounding the icefield is permanently covered with snow.
