= Radiant Glacier =

Glacier in British Columbia, Canada

- Location within British Columbia
- Location: Waddington Range
- Coordinates: 51°26′N 125°13′W
- Length: approximately 5 km
- Terminus: tributary of Scimitar Glacier

Radiant Glacier is part of the Waddington Range in the southern Coast Mountains of British Columbia, Canada. It flows to the northeast from Mount Tiedemann for approximately 5 km (3.1 mi) before joining the larger Scimitar Glacier.
