= Parrish Glacier =

Glacier in Nunavut, Canada

Coordinates: 79°37′26″N 077°09′02″W

Parrish Glacier is a glacier on central Ellesmere Island, Nunavut, Canada.
