= Keyhole Glacier =

Glacier in Nunavut, Canada

Coordinates: 69°24′32″N 68°52′55″W

Keyhole Glacier is a glacier located in the central Baffin Mountains of northeastern Baffin Island, Nunavut, Canada.

== See also ==
- List of glaciers
