= Eugenie Glacier =

Glacier in Nunavut, Canada

Coordinates: 79°51′N 74°9′W

Eugenie Glacier is a glacier on central Ellesmere Island, Nunavut, Canada. It rises to approximately 364 m (1,194 ft) above sea level.

== See also ==
- List of glaciers
