= Byam Martin Mountains =

Mountain range in Nunavut, Canada

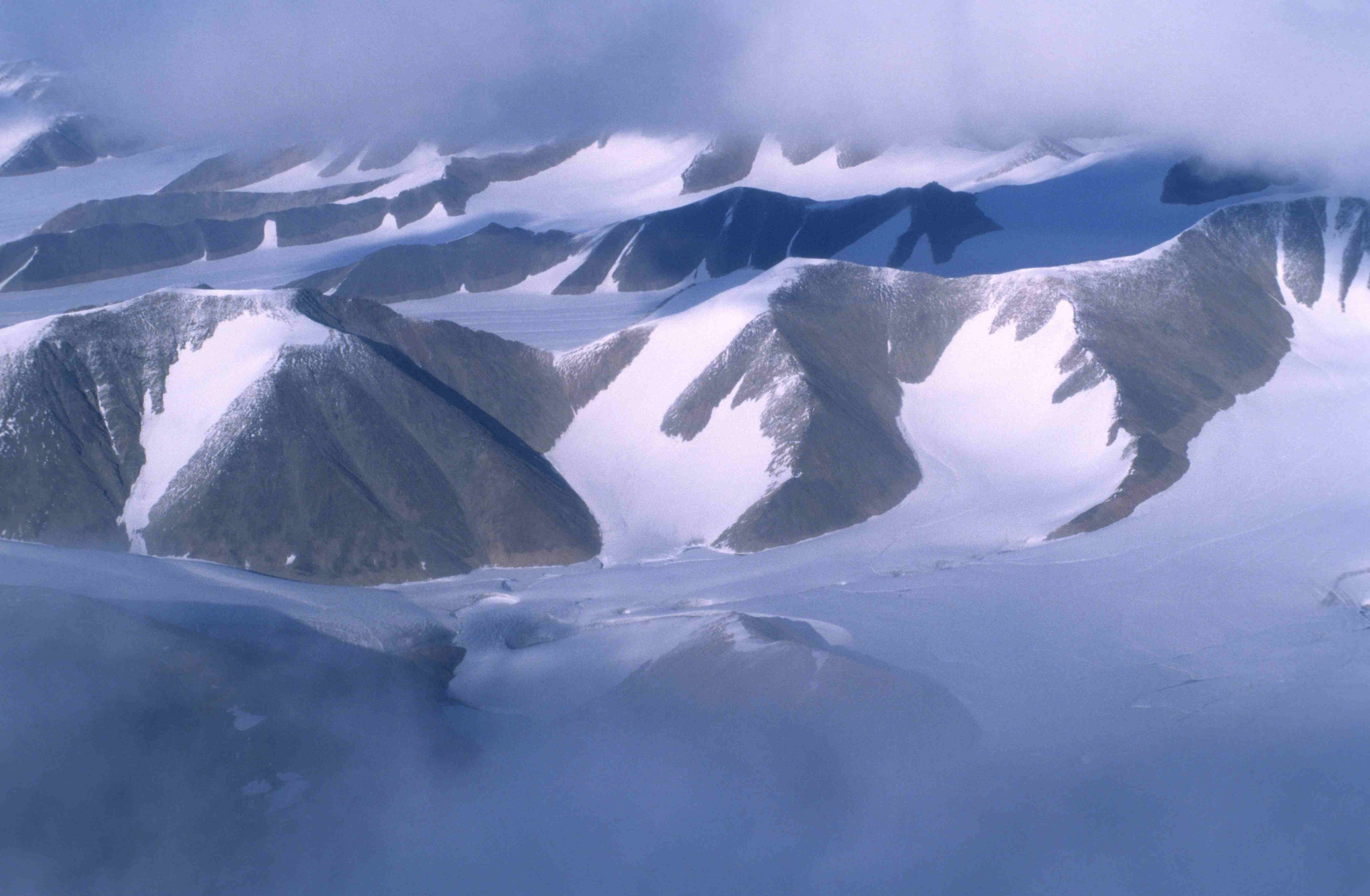
- Byam Martin Mountains

Highest point
- Peak: Angilaaq Mountain
- Elevation: 1,951 m (6,401 ft)
- Coordinates: 73°13′41.9″N 78°37′14.9″W

Geography
- Location within Nunavut
- Country: Canada
- Region: Nunavut
- Parent range: Baffin Mountains

The Byam Martin Mountains (/ˌbaɪəm ˈmɑːrtɪn/ BY-əm MAR-tin) are a rugged mountain range extending the length of Bylot Island, Nunavut, Canada. It is one of the most northern ranges in the world and is an extension of the Baffin Mountains, which in turn form part of the Arctic Cordillera mountain system. The highest mountain in the range is Angilaaq Mountain at 1,951 m (6,401 ft), located near the island's center. Sharp peaks and ridges, divided by deep glacier-filled valleys, are typical features in the range and has been extensively modified by glacial erosion. The Byam Martin Mountains have not been conducive to habitation. While there are no permanent settlements in the Byam Martin Mountains, Inuit from Pond Inlet and elsewhere regularly travel to the range.

The Byam Martin Mountains are made up of Archean-Aphebian igneous crystalline rock and Proterozoic metasedimentary and metamorphic rock, such as gneiss.

== History ==
The first known expedition to the Byam Martin Mountains was by Pat Baird in 1939. He traversed Bylot Island from the Aktineq Glacier to Bathurst Bay on the east coast and returned down the Sermilik Glacier. On 7 June 1939 he climbed an unnamed, 6,000-foot mountain at coordinates 73° 06.7' N 78° 30.5' W. Mount Thule, at 1,711 m (5,614 ft), was climbed in 1954 by American Ben Ferris, a member of the Harvard Mountaineering Club. In 1963, British explorer Bill Tilman sailed his boat to the north coast and traversed the island from north to south, but did not climb any of the larger peaks. Laurie Dexter, an Anglican minister and Arctic resident, explored and climbed peaks on the southern coast. In 1974, Dr. George Van Brunt Cochran climbed an unnamed peak west of the Narsarsuk Glacier on the south coast. In 1977, a Canadian expedition led by Rob Kelly and four others, traversed the island from northwest to southeast. They climbed 20 peaks, including Pat Baird's unnamed peak on 27 July 1977. In June 1981, another Canadian expedition led by Jack DeBruyn with three other members of the Grant MacEwan Mountain Club from Edmonton, Alberta, traversed the island from northwest to south. They climbed 15 peaks, with 14 first ascents, and also Pat Baird's unnamed peak on 3 July 1981. In 1984, another Canadian expedition led by Mike Schmidt and others traversed the island from north to southeast, climbing 28 peaks, with 16 first ascents.

== Gallery ==
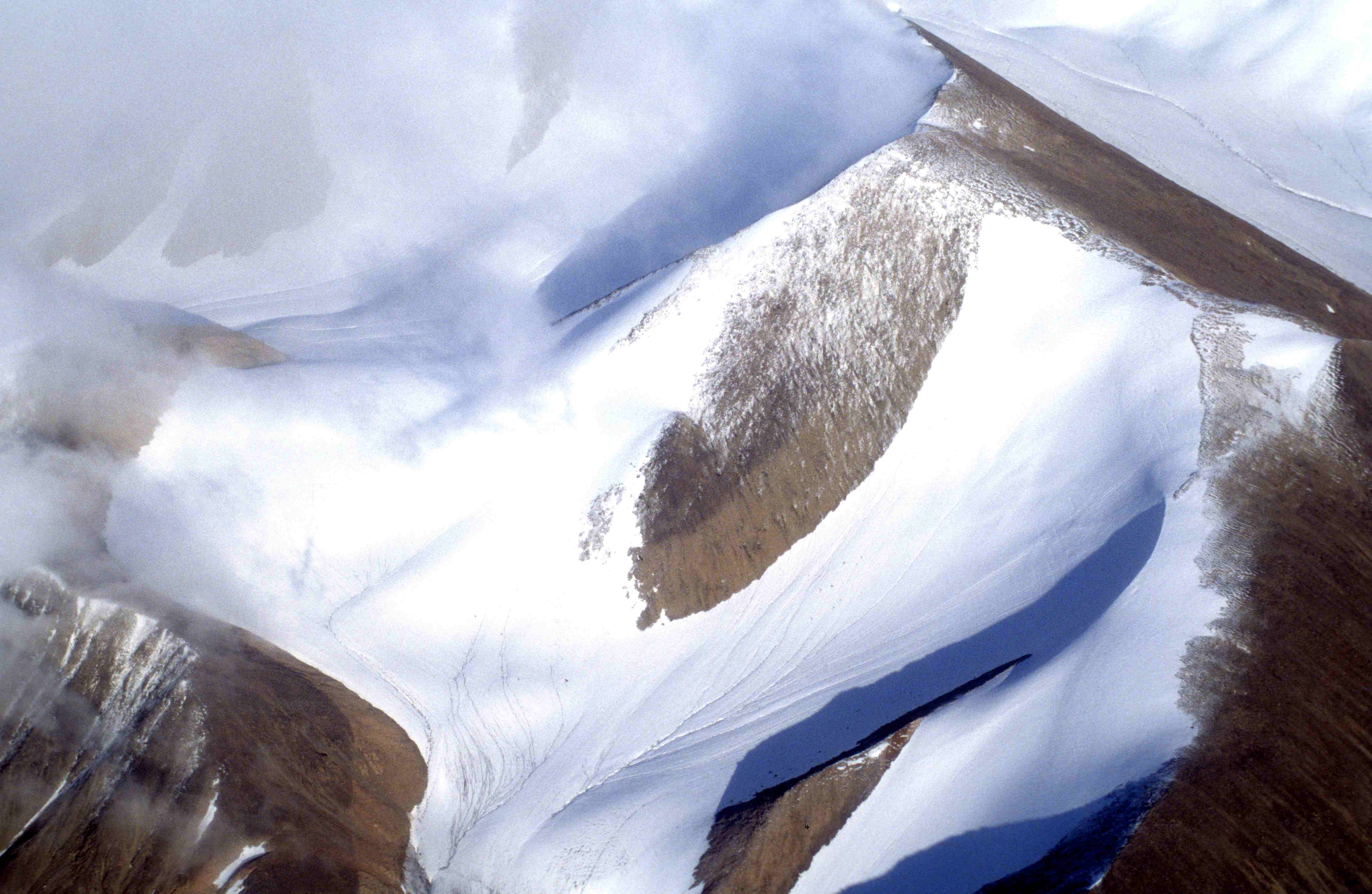
Byam Martin Mountains

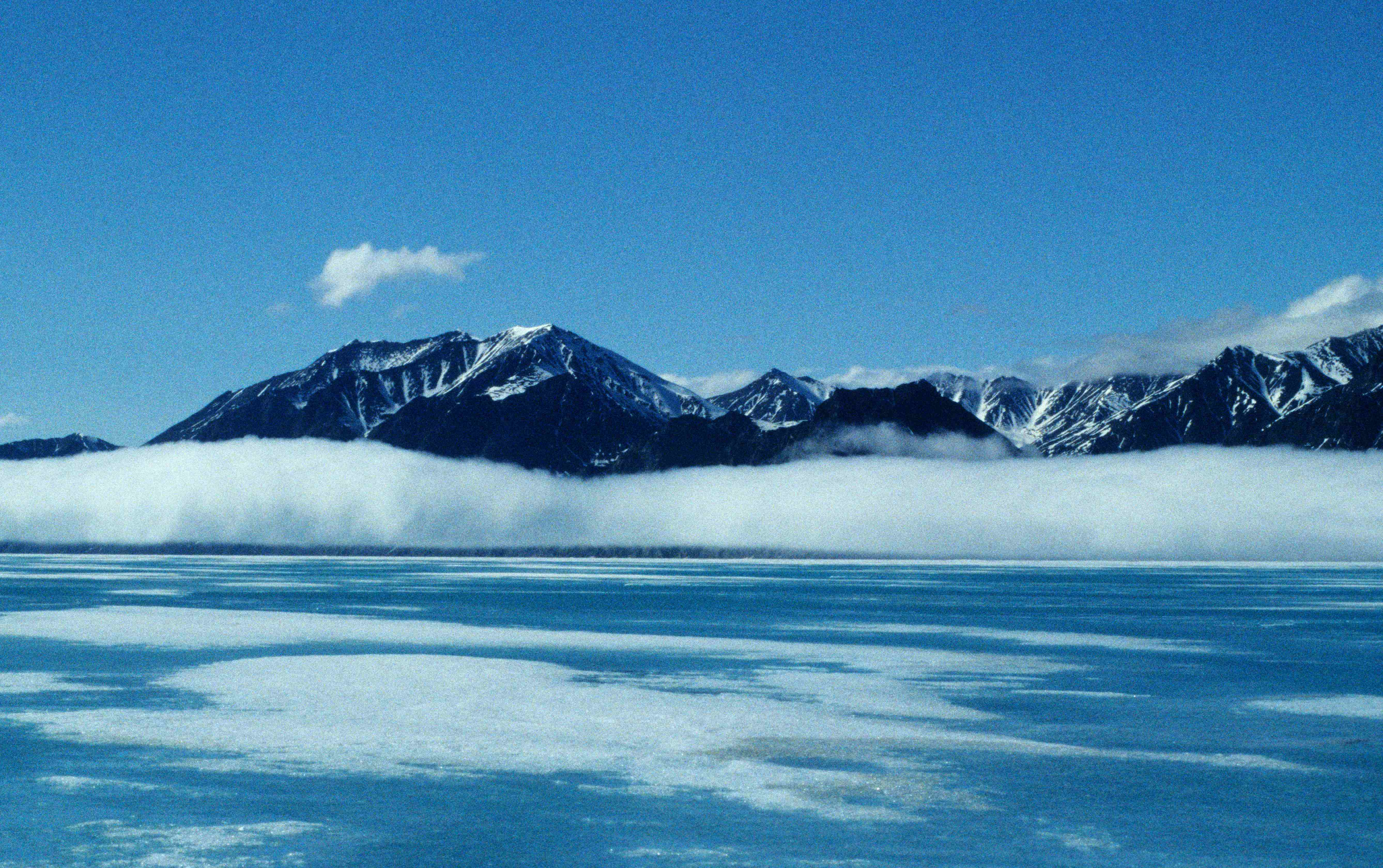
Byam Martin Mountains viewed from the foggy sea

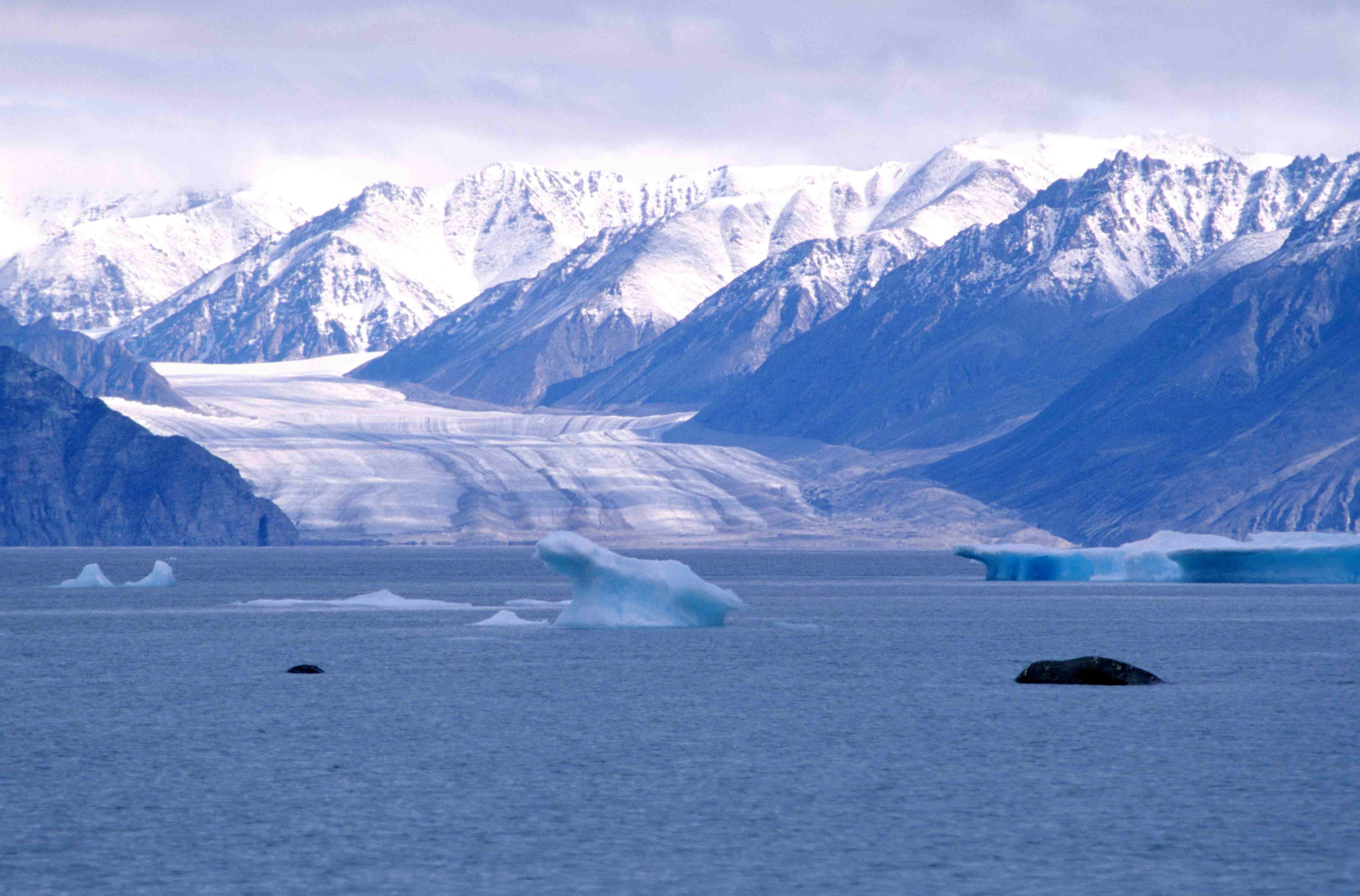
Kaparoqtalik Glacier in the southern Byam Martin Mountains

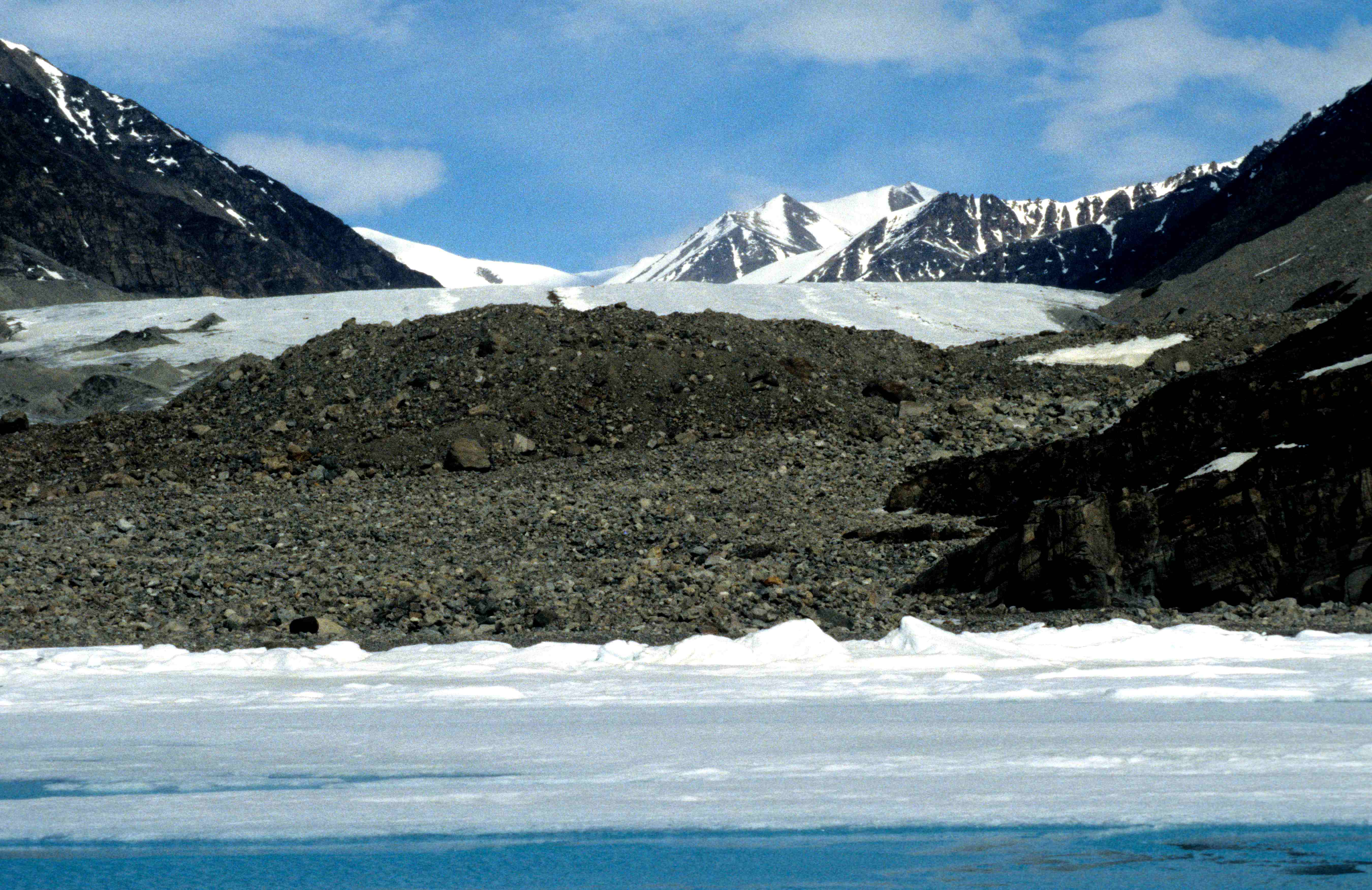
Nararsuk Glacier in the southern Byam Martin Mountains

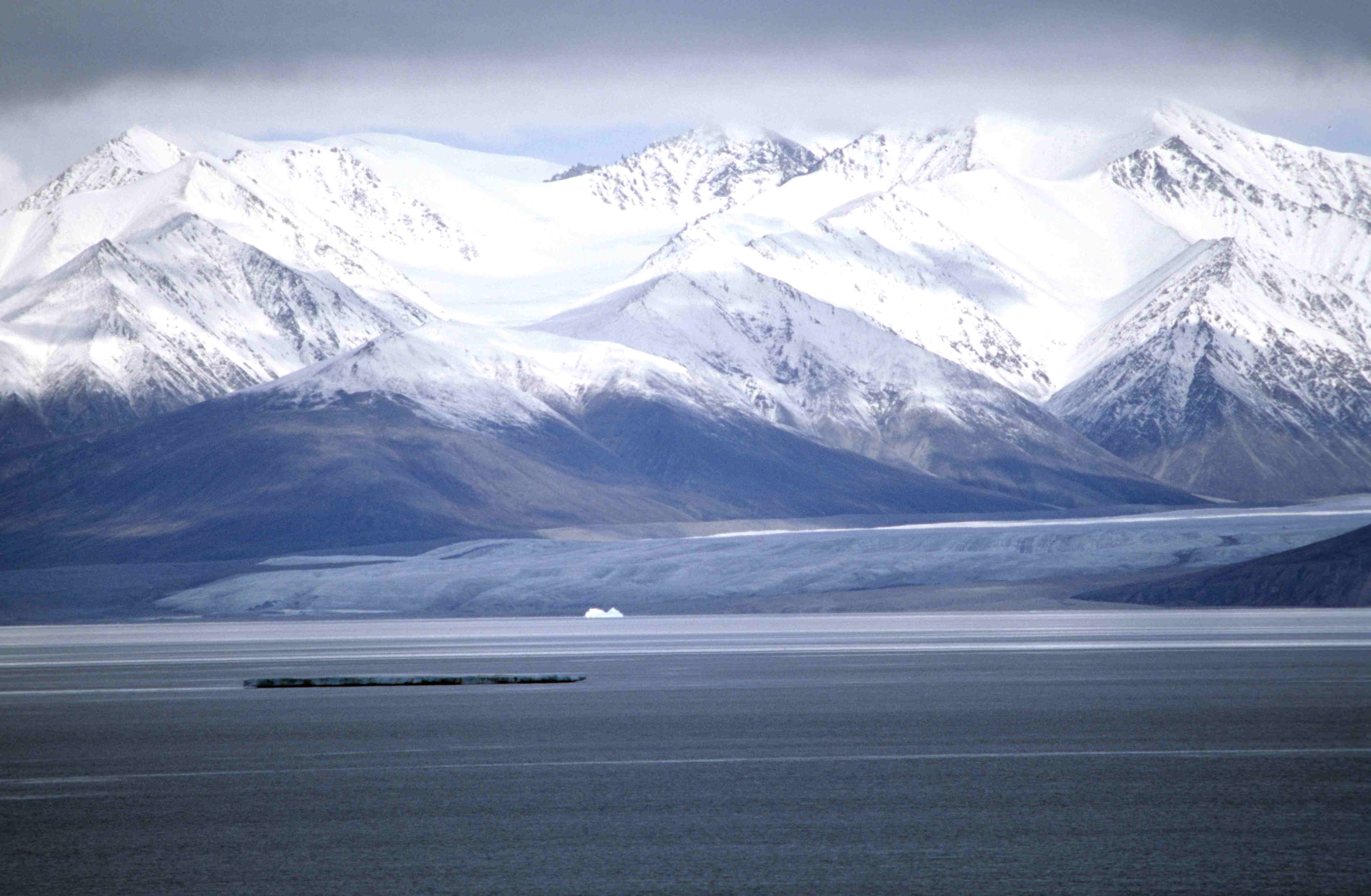
Girmilik Glacier in the southern Byam Martin Mountains

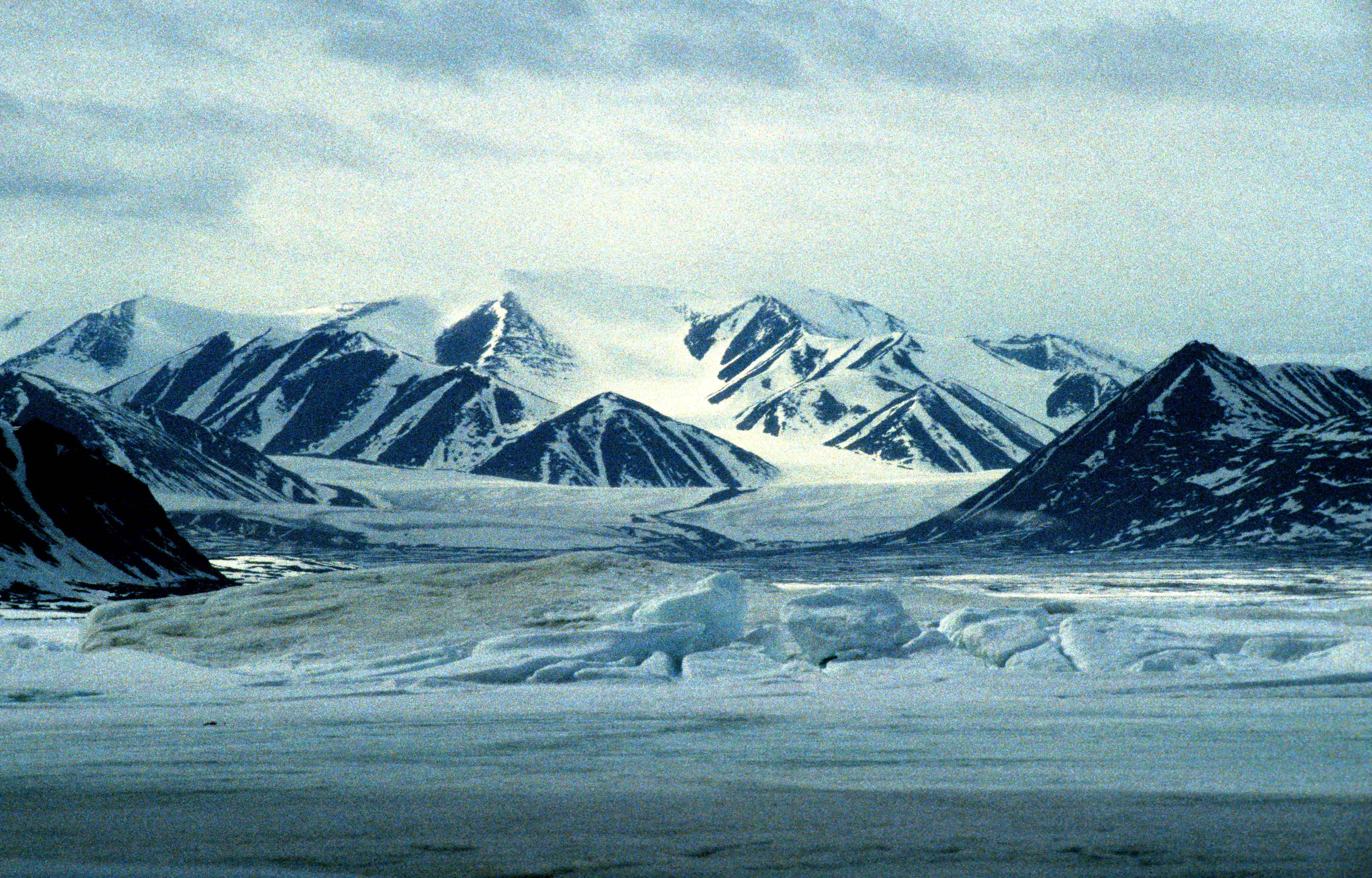
Unnamed glacier in the eastern Byam Martin Mountains

== See also ==
- Sirmilik National Park, which includes most of Bylot Island
