= 99.9 FM =

FM radio frequency

The following radio stations broadcast on FM frequency 99.9 MHz:

== Argentina ==
- La 100 in Buenos Aires
- Estación del Sur in Rosario, Santa Fe
- León FM in Rosario, Santa Fe
- X99 in Bahía Blanca, Buenos Aires
- 99.9 in Mar del Plata, Buenos Aires
- Ciudad in San Genaro, Santa Fe
- Omega in Gualeguaychú, Entre Ríos
- Mágica in Barranqueras, Chaco
- Cooperativa in Anisacate, Córdoba
- Yguazú in Puerto Iguazú, Misiones
- LVQ in Necochea, Buenos Aires
- Like in Sampacho, Córdoba
- Agua in Tandil, Buenos Aires
- LRH 318 Don Orione in Sáenz Peña, Chaco
- Olivos in Mendoza
- Pop in San Nicolás de los Arroyos, Buenos Aires
- Maximo in Santa Rosa, La Pampa
- Calden in Bernasconi, La Pampa
- Latina in Lamadrid, Buenos Aires
- 100 Federal in Federal, Entre Rïos
- Top in Arroyito, Córdoba
- Rio in Romang, Santa Fe
- UNPA in Río Gallegos, Santa Cruz

== Australia ==
- 2PNN in Goulburn, New South Wales
- BayFm 99.9 in Byron Bay, New South Wales
- Rhema FM in Port Macquarie, New South Wales
- 2SWR in Sydney, New South Wales
- Radio TAB in Rockhampton, Queensland
- 5MBS in Adelaide, South Australia
- 3WIZ in Melbourne, Victoria
- 3TFM in Sale, Victoria
- VoiceFM in Ballaarat, Victoria

== Brazil ==
- FM 99,9 (ZYC 410) in Fortaleza, Ceará

== Canada (Channel 260) ==
- CBCS-FM in Sudbury, Ontario
- CBF-FM-17 in Lac-Édouard, Quebec
- CBF-FM-18 in Parent Quebec
- CBK-FM-5 in North Battleford, Saskatchewan
- CBMA-FM in Rouyn, Quebec
- CBR-FM-1 in Red Deer, Alberta
- CBU-FM-7 in Chilliwack, British Columbia
- CBWC-FM in Moose Lake, Manitoba
- CBWG-FM in Gillam, Manitoba
- CBWN-FM in God's Lake Narrows, Manitoba
- CHJX-FM in London, Ontario
- CFGX-FM in Sarnia, Ontario
- CFNM-FM in Nemaska, Quebec
- CFVM-FM in Amqui, Quebec
- CFWM-FM in Winnipeg, Manitoba
- CHEF-FM in Matagami, Quebec
- CHOY-FM in Moncton, New Brunswick
- CHPQ-FM in Parksville, British Columbia
- CHSU-FM in Kelowna, British Columbia
- CHTC-FM in Tsiigehtchic, Northwest Territories
- CHTN-FM-1 in Elmira, Prince Edward Island
- CJGM-FM in Gananoque, Ontario
- CJIJ-FM in Sydney, Nova Scotia
- CJMG-FM-2 in Oliver, British Columbia
- CJRG-FM-6 in Petite-Vallee, Quebec
- CJRI-FM-2 in St. Stephen, New Brunswick
- CJUK-FM in Thunder Bay, Ontario
- CJWC-FM-1 in Tofino, British Columbia
- CKFM-FM in Toronto, Ontario
- CKIQ-FM in Iqaluit, Nunavut
- CKIQ-FM-2 in Rankin Inlet, Nunavut
- CKJJ-FM-2 in Brockville, Ontario
- CKOK-FM in Nain, Newfoundland and Labrador
- CKQB-FM-1 in Pembroke, Ontario
- CKSB-4-FM in Flin Flon, Manitoba
- CKSB-5-FM in Thompson, Manitoba
- VF2100 in Fort St. James, British Columbia
- VF2156 in Poste Laverendrye, Quebec
- VF2415 in Fraser Lake, British Columbia
- VF2508 in Golden, British Columbia
- VOAR-10-FM in Port-aux-Basques, Newfoundland and Labrador

== China ==
- GRT News Radio LPFM in Doumen, Zhuhai

== Germany ==
- Radio Ramasuri in Weiden, Bavaria
- Radio Alpenwelle south of Munich

== Guatemala (Channel 80) ==
- Radio Punto in Escuintla
- Galaxia La Picosa in Quetzaltenango, Retalhuleu,, Mazatenango, Zacapa, Chiquimula
- La Ley FM in Tacaná, San Marcos

== Indonesia ==
- Z99.9 FM in Jakarta

== Malaysia ==
- 988 FM in Johor Bahru, Johor and Singapore
- Asyik FM in Damak, Pahang

== Mexico ==
- XHCJX-FM in Bahía de Banderas, Nayarit
- XHCTC-FM in Ciudad Cuauhtémoc, Chihuahua
- XHEBCS-FM in La Paz, Baja California Sur
- XHELA-FM in Candela, Coahuila
- XHEMZ-FM in Emiliano Zapata, Tabasco
- XHEPX-FM in El Vigía, Oaxaca
- XHETOR-FM in Torreón-Matamoros, Coahuila
- XHEV-FM in Izucar de Matamoros, Puebla
- XHKB-FM in Guadalajara, Jalisco
- XHNNO-FM in Naco, Sonora
- XHSCDP-FM in Tacoaleche, Guadalupe Municipality, Zacatecas
- XHSCHP-FM in Tarímbaro, Michoacán
- XHSG-FM in Piedras Negras, Coahuila
- XHSIL-FM in Siltepec, Chiapas
- XHSO-FM in León, Guanajuato
- XHTE-FM in Tehuacán, Puebla

== Philippines ==
- DYCU in Puerto Princesa City
- DZWR in Baguio City
- DZGV in Batangas City
- DWEB in Nabua, Camarines Sur
- DYFJ in Bacolod City
- DYRG in Guindulman, Bohol
- DXMR-FM in Cagayan de Oro City

== South Korea ==
- OBS Radio in Seoul Metropolitan Area

== Taiwan ==
- Kiss Radio Taiwan in Kaohsiung

== United Kingdom ==
- Greatest Hits Radio Norfolk & North Suffolk in Norwich

== United States (Channel 260) ==
- KAHG-LP in Hood River, Oregon
- KAQQ-LP in Alliance, Nebraska
- KAUS in Austin, Minnesota
- KBAT in Monahans, Texas
- KBDP-LP in Bridgeport, Nebraska
- KBFL-FM in Fair Grove, Missouri
- KBOZ-FM in Bozeman, Montana
- KCIV in Mount Bullion, California
- KCML in Saint Joseph, Minnesota
- KCWN in New Sharon, Iowa
- KDUB-LP in Watsonville, California
- KDVP-LP in Denton, Texas
- KEKB in Fruita, Colorado
- KESZ in Phoenix, Arizona
- KFAV in Warrenton, Missouri
- KFMJ in Ketchikan, Alaska
- KGHO-LP in Hoquiam, Washington
- KGOR in Omaha, Nebraska
- KGPQ in Monticello, Arkansas
- KHIH in Liberty, Texas
- KHQR-LP in Harlingen, Texas
- KIRK (FM) in Macon, Missouri
- KISW in Seattle, Washington
- KJKS in Kahului, Hawaii
- KKPL in Cheyenne, Wyoming
- KKTC in Angel Fire, New Mexico
- KLKV in Hunt, Texas
- KLMB in Klein, Montana
- KLUR in Wichita Falls, Texas
- KMGG-LP in Albuquerque, New Mexico
- KMKR-LP in Tucson, Arizona
- KMOO in Mineola, Texas
- KMXA in Minot, North Dakota
- KNJC-LP in Houston, Texas
- KOLA in San Bernardino, California
- KONY in Saint George, Utah
- KPHT-LP in Laytonville, California
- KPVO in Fountain Green, Utah
- KRCX in Marysville, California
- KRKT in Albany, Oregon
- KRVT-LP in Rancho Viejo, Texas
- KSAB in Robstown, Texas
- KSEP-LP in Brookings, Oregon
- KSGS-LP in Rio Grande City, Texas
- KSKG in Salina, Kansas
- KTCS in Fort Smith, Arkansas
- KTDY in Lafayette, Louisiana
- KTEZ in Zwolle, Louisiana
- KTOH in Kalaheo, Hawaii
- KTQM-FM in Clovis, New Mexico
- KTRO-LP in Espanola, New Mexico
- KTSM in El Paso, Texas
- KTXM in Hallettsville, Texas
- KTYD in Santa Barbara, California
- KUAA-LP in Salt Lake City, Utah
- KUPR-LP in Placitas, New Mexico
- KUPY in Sugar City, Idaho
- KVBN-LP in Enid, Oklahoma
- KVOX in Moorhead, Minnesota
- KVUU in Pueblo, Colorado
- KWCK-FM in Searcy, Arkansas
- KWKR in Leoti, Kansas
- KWMG-LP in White City, Oregon
- KWRG-LP in Wrangell, Alaska
- KXLY in Spokane, Washington
- KXRW-LP in Vancouver, Washington
- KXTC in Thoreau, New Mexico
- KYBS-LP in Balch Springs, Texas
- KYMZ in Somerton, Arizona
- KZDX in Burley, Idaho
- KZMA in Naylor, Missouri
- KZOA-LP in Mission, Texas
- WACO in Waco, Texas
- WBTZ in Plattsburgh, New York
- WCHD in Kettering, Ohio
- WCMC in Creedmoor, North Carolina
- WEHF-LP in Bennettsville, South Carolina
- WEZN in Bridgeport, Connecticut
- WFEL-LP in Antioch, Illinois
- WFRE in Frederick, Maryland
- WGNE in Middleburg, Florida
- WGNW in Cornell, Wisconsin
- WHAK-FM in Rogers City, Michigan
- WHCH in Custer, Michigan
- WHDX in Waves, North Carolina
- WHHB in Holliston, Massachusetts
- WHHS in Havertown, Pennsylvania
- WIII (FM) in Cortland, New York
- WIME-LP in Orlando, Florida
- WIOA in San Juan, Puerto Rico
- WIZU-LP in Newark, Delaware
- WJRQ-LP in Poinciana, Florida
- WJVL in Janesville, Wisconsin
- WKIS in Boca Raton, Florida
- WKKO in Toledo, Ohio
- WKMY in Athol, Massachusetts
- WKSF in Old Fort, North Carolina
- WKXB in Boiling Spring Lakes, North Carolina
- WMTC in Vancleve, Kentucky
- WMXC in Mobile, Alabama
- WNNG-FM in Unadilla, Georgia
- WODE in Easton, Pennsylvania
- WOGJ-LP in Orlando, Florida
- WOOP-LP in Cleveland, Tennessee
- WOOZ in Harrisburg, Illinois
- WPKA-LP in Apopka, Florida
- WQBR (FM) in Avis, Pennsylvania
- WQEB-LP in Winchester, Massachusetts
- WQNR in Tallassee, Alabama
- WQRC in Barnstable, Massachusetts
- WRJL in Eva, Alabama
- WSAU-FM in Rudolph, Wisconsin
- WSMS in Artesia, Mississippi
- WSNT in Sandersville, Georgia
- WTGP-LP in Pikeville, Tennessee
- WTHI in Terre Haute, Indiana
- WTHT in Auburn, Maine
- WTUZ in Uhrichsville, Ohio
- WUCC in Williston, South Carolina
- WUCP-LP in Farragut, Tennessee
- WUSZ in Virginia, Minnesota
- WVAF in Charleston, West Virginia
- WVLC in Mannsville, Kentucky
- WWCT in Bartonville, Illinois
- WWFG in Ocean City, Maryland
- WXJB in Homosassa, Florida
- WXKC in Erie, Pennsylvania
- WXJB in Brooksville, Florida
- WXMZ in Hartford, Kentucky
- WXTY in Lafayette, Florida
- WYHI in Park Forest, Illinois
- WYML-LP in Ingleside, Illinois
- WYTZ-FM in Benton Harbor, Michigan
- WZAL-LP in Alabaster, Alabama
- WZBB in Stanleytown, Virginia
- WZJM-LP in Freeburg, Illinois
- WZNC-LP in Bethlehem, New Hampshire

== Vietnam ==
- VOH 99.9, in Ho Chi Minh city
