= WQBR =

WQBR can refer to:

- WQBR (FM), an FM radio station licensed to Avis, Pennsylvania
- WQBR (AM), a campus radio station at Eastern Michigan University
