= WFEL =

WFEL may refer to:

- WFEL (formerly Williams Fairey Engineering Limited), the British subsidiary of armoured vehicle manufacturers KNDS, descended from Fairey Aviation Company
- WFEL-LP, a radio station
