= KDUB =

KDUB may refer to:

- KDUB-LP, a low-power radio station (99.9 FM) licensed to serve Watsonville, California, United States
- KNSY, a radio station (89.7 FM) licensed to serve Dubuque, Iowa, United States, which held the call sign KDUB from 2004 to 2012
- KFXB-TV, a television station (channel 40) licensed to serve Dubuque, Iowa, which used the call signs KDUB or KDUB-TV until August 1995
