= CKGC-FM =

Radio station in Iqaluit, Nunavut, Canada

- Iqaluit, Nunavut; Canada
- Broadcast area: Iqaluit and Apex, Iqaluit
- Frequency: 103.5 MHz
- Branding: 103.5 Capital FM

Programming
- Format: 80s hits
- Affiliations: The Canadian Press

Ownership
- Owner: Northern Lights Entertainment, Inc.

History
- First air date: March 25, 2011
- Call sign meaning: CKIQ-FM

Technical information
- Class: A1
- Power: 205 watts
- HAAT: −41 metres (−135 ft)
- Transmitter coordinates: 63°44′57.12″N 68°31′18.84″W

Links
- Webcast: CKGC-FM Webstream
- Website: CKGC-FM Online

CKGC-FM is an 80s Hits formatted broadcast radio station. The station is licensed to Iqaluit, Nunavut and serves Iqaluit and Apex in Nunavut. CKGC-FM is owned and operated by Northern Lights Entertainment, Inc.

== History ==
On February 1, 2010, the Canadian Radio-television and Telecommunications Commission (CRTC) approved an application by Northern Lights Entertainment Inc. to operate a new English-language FM radio station in Iqaluit at 103.5 MHz (channel 278A) with an effective radiated power of 415 watts (non-directional antenna with an effective height of the antenna above average terrain of -37.8 metres).

The station signed on the air on March 25, 2011.
