= KYMZ =

Radio station in Somerton, Arizona, United States

- Somerton, Arizona; United States
- Broadcast area: Yuma, Arizona; San Luis Río Colorado, Sonora
- Frequency: 99.9 MHz
- Branding: KYMZ 99.9 FM

Programming
- Language: Spanish
- Format: community

Ownership
- Owner: Campesinos Sin Fronteras

Technical information
- Licensing authority: FCC
- Facility ID: 184678
- Class: C3
- ERP: 25,000 watts
- HAAT: 56 meters (184 ft)
- Transmitter coordinates: 32°38′31″N 114°33′34″W

Links
- Public license information: Public file; LMS
- Website: www.kymz.org

KYMZ (99.9 FM) is a radio station licensed to serve Somerton, Arizona, United States, serving the Yuma, Arizona area as well as communities in San Luis Río Colorado, Sonora, Mexico. The station is owned by Campesinos Sin Fronteras and targeted at Hispanics and especially farmworkers in the region.

== History ==
KYMZ received a construction permit in 2015. Campesinos Sin Fronteras worked for nearly three years to obtain the $500,000 needed to build KYMZ and get it on air. Concerns over an agreement to remove antennas from a Somerton water tower clouded CSF's efforts to put its antenna on the tower In November 2017, with the construction permit deadline months away, CSF held a gala dinner to raise funds to build KYMZ. Two months later, the group began surveying residents on both sides of the border about potential programs.
