= Nunavut Public Library Services =

Library system in Nunavut, Canada

- Type: Public Library Services in Qikiqtani, Kivalliq, and Kitikmeot in Nunavut
- Branches: 10

Collection
- Items collected: books, e-books, music, cds, periodicals, maps, genealogical archives, business directories, local history,

Other information
- Website: Nunavut Public Library Services website

Nunavut Public Library Services (NPLS) is the public library system serving the citizens of the Canadian territory of Nunavut. The libraries which comprise Nunavut Public Library Services exist in the three administrative regions: Qikiqtaaluk, Kivalliq, and Kitikmeot.

== Services ==
- Information and reference services
- Access to full text databases
- Community information
- Internet access
- Reader's advisory services
- Programs for children, youth and adults

== Collection ==
The libraries which comprise the Nunavut Public Library Services offer traditional print materials such as books and periodicals, as well as computer-based electronic resources, educational and commercially-produced films DVD, and sound recordings.

As many public libraries do, NPLS has its catalogue records created out-of-house. Their catalogue records are created in MARC (Machine Readable Cataloguing) by the Library Services Centre of Kitchener, Ontario. Once the items arrive at the headquarters in Baker Lake their catalogue records are imported into the online catalogue, and mailed to the libraries for circulation.

The collection of the Nunavut Public Library Services is available to search online. Searches can choose from basic keyword searching to advanced searches.

== Community services and programming ==
The Nunavut Public Library Services serves its community by providing traditional and innovative information services. The libraries lend resources, create community programming, offering periodical resources, and hosting educational programs.

An example of community-based programming is the After-School Homework Club at the May Hakongak Community Library located in Kiilinik High School in Cambridge Bay. Run entirely by volunteers, the Club offers children the opportunity to work on school and art projects guided by high school students. The program began as a response to the community's need for affordable after school care. However, according to one study, this program has become much more: it not only improves literacy rates among Inuit youth, it extends the tradition of Ilippallianginnarniq, the Inuit approach to intergenerational learning.

The commitment to traditional communication techniques is also seen in the library's creation of the May Hakongak Community Library Reading Tent. The tent, painted by local artists and volunteers, was to serve as a site similar to those elders would recognize as a gathering place. The tent is used to promote storytelling and reading, and is also used during community events.

The May Hakongak branch also facilitated the creation of an oral history centre where visitors can listen to community members recount their experiences. The interviews were conducted, transcribed, edited and translated by community members of all ages, making this an intergenerational project. Once the project was finished, and the centre created, the library saw its circulation rate rise from an average of 300 borrowed resources per month to over 1000. Some of these interviews, available in Inuinnaqtun and in English translation, are stored as mp3’s, and are accessible over the internet via the Library’s website.

The Iqaluit Centennial Library offers a variety of programs that focus on literacy. Working with groups such as the Nunavut Literacy Council and the City of Iqaluit, the library offers a summer camp for reading, and a story time event. The Library encourages public service by offering high school students the chance to earn graduation credits in exchange for library work.

The Donald Suluk Library frequently serves as a resource to students in Arviat. One recent example is the support it provided to students at Levi Angmak Iliniarvialaaq Elementary School, assisting with a unique student-created website. The Arviat Iglu Web Site features igloo-building demonstrations and a collection of elder oral history interviews conducted by the students. The project incorporated many priorities of the community: in addition to emphasizing and honouring traditional skills, the children were also learning how to work with new technologies.

Many of the Nunavut Public Services Libraries serve as Community Access Program (CAP) sites. The CAP program, funded by the Territorial government, aims to provide Canadians with free access to the internet. In addition to providing the computers, libraries assist patrons with learning the skills for navigating the web, and retrieving good information from it. This program is particularly important for ensuring that adults in the communities can continue to engage in lifelong learning. There is evidence that by bringing the computers into libraries, other resources are accessed; in 2001, the Iqaluit Centennial library noted that an increase in patrons for the computers increased the circulation numbers as well.

== Funding ==
The Nunavut Public Library Services receives its primary funding from the Department of Culture and Heritage, but it also has created relationships with a number of private and public organizations, who fund important projects.

== Branches ==
The libraries which comprise Nunavut Public Library Services exist in three communities: Qikiqtani, Kivalliq, and Kitikmeot.

=== Qikiqtani ===
- Clyde River Community Library in Clyde River
- Iqaluit Centennial Library in Iqaluit
- Qimiruvik Library in Pangnirtung
- Rebecca P. Idlout Library in Pond Inlet

=== Kivalliq ===
- Donald Suluk Library in Arviat
- John Ayaruaq Library in Rankin Inlet

=== Kitikmeot ===
- May Hakongak Community Library in Cambridge Bay
- Kugluktuk Community Library in Kugluktuk

== Administrative structure and history ==
Nunavut was established as a Canadian territory in 1999 when it separated from the Northwest Territories (NWT). The Nunavut Public Library Services operate as part of the Division of Heritage in the Nunavut Department of Culture and Heritage.

In May 2006, the NPLS opened its new headquarters in the Kivalliq region community of Baker Lake.

== Community profile ==
Nunavut is the largest and newest Canadian territory; Nunavut means “Our Land” in Inuktitut, the Inuit language. Inuit make up 85.4% of the population of Nunavut; the rest of the citizens are of European descent.

Of the 36,991,981 inhabitants which comprise the communities of Canada, only 36,858 live in Nunavut; this population is spread over the territory’s 1,836,993.78 km^{2} (709,267.26 sq mi) The land and its location are a factor in Nunavut’s low population density; in fact, Nunavut is one of the least populated areas on earth. The area comprises two parts: a mainland in the Canadian Shield and the islands in the Arctic Archipelago; the majority of the land lies within the Arctic Circle, above 66°30’ north latitude, with the northernmost being Grise Fiord at 78°.

With snow and ice covering much of the area throughout the year, there is no farming, and the construction of railways and highways to connect the cities and settlements is impossible. Major supplies, including food and fuel, are brought in by air or sea. The geography has also imposed limitations on the creation of traditional communication infrastructures, such as cables and wires for phone and internet connections. Add to this the fact that there are four official languages spoken—Inuktitut, Inuinnaqtun, English and French—communication of information in this population can be a challenge.

Despite the isolation and dispersion of the population, modern technology has increased the ability of Nunavut residents to interact and receive information from the rest of North America. Until recently, Nunavut relied on expensive satellite technology for internet communication. In 2005, cheaper broadband services were established in some areas by the non-profit Nunavut Broadband Development Corporation; there is a plan in place to connect most communities to broadband communication in the next few years.

However, traditional barriers to information access still exist. There is no university in Nunavut (although post-secondary education is available at Nunavut Arctic College), and the rate of high school graduation is exceptionally low. There is a 20% unemployment rate, and the federal government provides 100% of the operating costs for the territory’s public and civic services.

These challenges provide the Nunavut Public Library Services with an important role to play in acting as a centre for information and resource for learning. As the local branches demonstrate, they do this creatively and in conjunction with other territorial and private institutions.
