= XHTE-FM =

Radio station in Tehuacán, Puebla, Mexico

- Tehuacán, Puebla; Mexico
- Frequency: 99.9 MHz
- Branding: Stereo Luz

Programming
- Format: Pop

Ownership
- Owner: López Cárdenas family; (Digital 99.9 Radiodifusores, S.A. de C.V.)

History
- First air date: March 16, 1980
- Call sign meaning: TEhuacán

Technical information
- ERP: 10 kW
- Transmitter coordinates: 18°28′20.8″N 97°23′35.0″W

Links
- Website: www.stereoluztehuacan.com

XHTE-FM is a radio station on 99.9 FM in Tehuacán, Puebla, Mexico.

== History ==
XHTE received its concession on February 1, 1980, but signed March 18 a month later also the first FM in Tehuacán. It was owned by Ángel López Meza. Control was consolidated in the López Cárdenas family operating as Digital 99.9 Radiodifusores in 2010.

Long known as Stereo Luz, the station changed names and formats to become Ke Buena in May 2021. This was dropped after 10 months in March 2022.
