= Archaeology of Nunavut =

Overview of archaeology in Nunavut, Canada

Canada welcomed its most recent territory, Nunavut, on April 1, 1999, after it separated from the Northwest Territories. With Nunavut's separation from the Northwest Territories came a need for new regulations regarding cultural history. Nunavut has the unique experience of having a large Aboriginal community that creates strong cultural ties within the legislation.

== Aboriginal Ties ==
The Aboriginal ties within Nunavut are clear without knowing the territory; one just needs to view the flag. "The colors, blue and gold symbolize the riches of the land, sea and sky. Red is a reference to Canada. The inuksuk symbolizes stone monuments which guide people on the land and mark sacred and other special places." The North Star is also featured on the flag symbolizing the leadership of elders in the community. These are clear markers that there is a strong relationship between archaeology and the Aboriginal community, therefore creating relevance with the government's cultural and archaeological practices. There are several environmental and archaeological policies and programs that are run by both Inuit and government members.

The Government of Nunavut lists Archaeology and Paleontology under the department of Culture and Heritage. Once again there is evidence of the close ties between elders and archaeology and therefore culture. This branch was established to provide leadership within the Government of Nunavut in the implementation and development of services, policies, and programs that are aimed to strengthen the culture, language, heritage and physical activity of Nunavut. The Nunavut Archaeology Program administers the archaeology and paleontology permitting process and work on the development of policies, technical standards and guidelines.

Nunavut Tunngavik Incorporated (NTI) ensures that promises made under the Nunavut Land Claims Agreement (NCLA) are carried out. One of the main NCLA concerns are that the Inuit exchanged their Aboriginal title to all their traditional land in the Nunavut Settlement Area for the rights and benefits. Rights and benefits are focused on land, wildlife, and water, as these are very important aspects to the Inuit way of life. NTI coordinates and manages Inuit responsibilities set out in the NCLA and makes sure that all federal and territorial governments fulfill their obligations such as help with travel between communities, the care of elders, and help with education.

There is also the Inuit Qauijimajatuqangt Katimajiit, which is a prestigious group of wise and talented Inuit who are responsible for advising the government on making programs and services more culturally relevant. The people selected for the group are appointed from outside the Government of Nunavut.

One of the ongoing projects is the recovery of artifacts from HMS Terror and HMS Erebus wrecks from Franklin's lost expedition. A smaller scale project is the Oral History Project which claims "Recording and documenting the traditional knowledge and history of Elders is a priority" and help retain the Inuit Language.
