= Rede Aleluia Fortaleza =

FM 99,9 (ZYC 410)
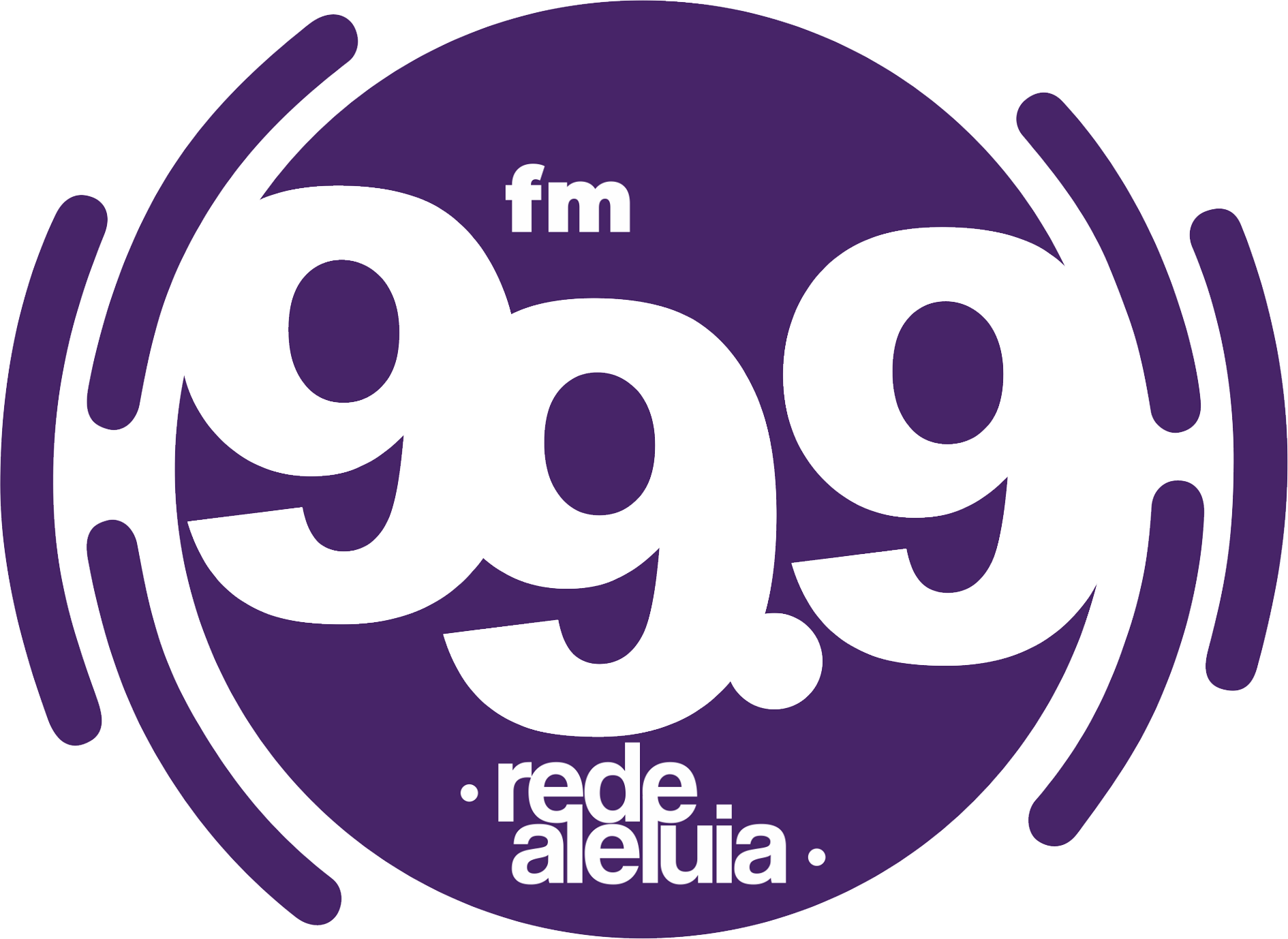

Fortaleza, Ceará; Brazil
- Frequency: 99.9 MHz

Programming
- Language: Portuguese
- Format: Evangelism; Christian music
- Affiliations: Rede Aleluia

Ownership
- Owner: Rádio Record de Fortaleza FM Ltda.
- Operator: Universal Church of the Kingdom of God
- Sister stations: Rádio Uirapuru

History
- First air date: February 12, 1986
- Former names: Dragão do Mar FM; 99 FM; Transamérica FM Fortaleza; Record FM

Technical information
- Licensing authority: ANATEL
- Class: A1
- ERP: 107.41 kW

Links
- Public license information: Profile

FM 99,9 (ZYC 410), also known as Rede Aleluia Fortaleza, is a Brazilian radio station licensed to Fortaleza, Ceará, serving the respective metropolitan area. The station is controlled by the Universal Church of the Kingdom of God, which broadcasts Rede Aleluia programming. It began operating in 1986 as Dragão do Mar FM and was sold to the Pague Menos pharmacy chain (managed by the Grupo de Comunicação O Povo) in the 1990s. Acquired in 1995 by the church, the radio station is now jointly controlled with Rádio Uirapuru.

== History ==
Rádio Dragão do Mar FM went on the air on February 12, 1986 on the frequency 99.9 MHz and had music programming for young audiences (CHR), similar to what was already being done by FM do Povo and Verdes Mares FM. To escape the competition, it quickly adopted a popular programming format, which was still unheard of on FM radio in Fortaleza. With this programming, the radio station achieved audience leadership. At the end of the 1980s, the radio station fell into decline due to low commercial returns and administrative dismantling. In the same period, it was renamed 99 FM. In 1994, the station was sold to the Pague Menos pharmacy chain, with management being taken over by Grupo de Comunicação O Povo, which at that time affiliated the station with the Transamérica FM network.

In mid-1995, the frequency ended its affiliation with Transamérica, changed its name back to 99 FM and was sold again, being acquired by the Universal Church of the Kingdom of God. The church's acquisition saw it operate in conjunction with Rádio Uirapuru, in the Joaquim Távora neighborhood, both of which were transmitters of the Rede Aleluia. As a gospel station, the radio station's highlights were the programs Greyce e Você and Momento do Presidiário and it appeared at times among the ten most listened to radio stations in Fortaleza.

== Bibliography ==
- Canalito, Jorge; Leme, Paulinho (2007). "Dragão do Mar FM 99,9 MHz "Quebrando Tabus"". Rádio FM: Em Fortaleza é outra história. Fortaleza, Ceará: Premius Editora. p. 145. ISBN 9788590732907.
- Azevedo, Miguel Ângelo de (2007). "Datas e fatos para a história do Ceará - 1986" (PDF). Revista do Instituto do Ceará (journal article). Fortaleza: 20.
- Lopes, Djane Nogueira (1997). O uso da comunicação como elemento de conquista da Igreja Universal: O caso da Rádio Record de Fortaleza (Monograph). Fortaleza: Federal University of Ceará. p. 71.
