= XHEPX-FM =

Radio station in Puerto Ángel, Oaxaca

Puerto Ángel, Oaxaca; Mexico
- Frequency: 99.9 FM
- Branding: La Voz del Ángel

Programming
- Format: News/talk

Ownership
- Owner: Radio Solución, S.A. de C.V.

History
- First air date: November 26, 1977 (concession)

Technical information
- ERP: 25 kW
- Transmitter coordinates: 15°43′02.5″N 96°28′23.7″W

Links
- Webcast: Listen live
- Website: lavozdelangel.com.mx

XHEPX-FM is a radio station on 99.9 FM in El Vigía, Oaxaca, serving Puerto Ángel. It is known as La Voz del Ángel.

== History ==
XEPX-AM 1340 received its concession on November 26, 1977. It was owned by Julio Jalil Tame and broadcast with 500 watts. By 1997, XEPX had moved to 650 kHz with 5,000 watts, and in 2011, it was authorized to move to FM.
