= XHSIL-FM =

Radio Chiapas station in Siltepec, Chiapas, Mexico

- Siltepec, Chiapas, Mexico; Mexico
- Frequency: 99.9 FM
- Branding: Radio Siltepec, La Señal de la Sierra

Ownership
- Owner: Sistema Chiapaneco de Radio, Televisión y Cinematografía

History
- First air date: February 22, 2017 (concession award)
- Call sign meaning: SILtepec

Technical information
- Class: C1
- Transmitter coordinates: 15°25′34.1″N 92°20′28.5″W

Links
- Website: radiotvycine.chiapas.gob.mx

XHSIL-FM is a radio station on 99.9 FM in Siltepec, Chiapas in Mexico. It is part of the state-owned Radio Chiapas state network.

== Radio Siltepec, La Señal de la Sierra ==
Prior to the establishment of a properly licensed radio station, the Chiapas state network established a pirate station in Siltepec, known as Radio Siltepec, La Señal de la Sierra. This station signed on August 2, 2012, on 102.5 MHz and was officially acknowledged by the state network for years despite not holding a concession.

== History with concession ==
On February 22, 2017, the IFT awarded a public concession for the Chiapas state network to build a properly licensed station in Siltepec, with callsign XHSIL-FM and broadcasting on a frequency of 99.9 MHz.
