= Nunavut =

Territory of Canada

Nunavut ᓄᓇᕗᑦ (Inuktitut syllabics)
- Territory
- Flag Coat of arms
- Motto(s): ᓄᓇᕗᑦ ᓴᙱᓂᕗᑦ (Nunavut Sannginivut) "Our land, our strength" "Notre terre, notre force"
- Coordinates: 67°21′N 90°54′W
- Country: Canada
- Before confederation: Districts of Franklin, Keewatin, Mackenzie
- Confederation: April 1, 1999; 27 years ago (13th)
- Capital (and largest city): Iqaluit

Government
  - Type: Parliamentary system with consensus government
  - Commissioner: Eva Aariak
  - Premier: John Main
- Legislature: Legislative Assembly of Nunavut
- Federal representation: Parliament of Canada
- House seats: 1 of 343 (0.3%)
- Senate seats: 1 of 105 (1%)

Area (2021 – land, 2020 – water)
  - Total: 2,093,190 km^{2} (808,190 sq mi)
  - Land: 1,836,993.78 km^{2} (709,267.26 sq mi)
  - Water: 160,930 km^{2} (62,140 sq mi) 7.7%
  - Rank: 1st
- 21% of Canada

Population (2021)
  - Total: 36,858
  - Estimate (Q3 2026): 43,091
  - Rank: 13th
  - Density: 0.02/km^{2} (0.052/sq mi)
- Demonym(s): Nunavummiut; Nunavummiuq (sing.)
- Official languages: Inuit (Inuktitut and Inuinnaqtun); English; French

GDP
  - Rank: 11th
  - Total (2024): C$5.668 billion
  - Per capita: C$136,875 (1st)

HDI
  - HDI (2023): 0.834—Very high (13th)
- Time zones: UTC−07:00 (MST)
  - Summer (DST): UTC−06:00 (MDT)
- UTC−06:00 (CST)
  - Summer (DST): UTC−05:00 (CDT)
- Southampton Island (Coral Harbour): UTC−05:00 (EST)
- UTC−04:00 (EST)
  - Summer (DST): UTC−04:00 (EDT)
- Canadian postal abbr.: NU
- Postal code prefix: X0A, X0B, X0C
- ISO 3166 code: CA-NU
- Flower: Purple saxifrage
- Tree: n/a
- Bird: Rock ptarmigan
- Website: gov.nu.ca
- Rankings include all provinces and territories

Nunavut (Note: /ˈnʊnəvuːt/, NUUN-ə-voot: French: [nunavut, nynavyt], Canadian French: [nunavʊt, nynavʏt]; Inuktitut: ᓄᓇᕗᑦ [nunavut], lit. 'our land') is the largest and northernmost territory of Canada. It was separated from the Northwest Territories in 1999, via the Nunavut Act and the Nunavut Land Claims Agreement Act, which provided this territory to the Inuit for self-government. The boundaries were drawn in 1993. The creation of Nunavut resulted in the first major change to Canada's political map in half a century since the province of Newfoundland, known as Newfoundland and Labrador since 2001, was admitted in 1949.

Nunavut comprises a major portion of Northern Canada and most of the Arctic Archipelago. Its vast territory makes it the fifth-largest country subdivision in the world. Nunavut's capital and Canada's smallest capital by population, Iqaluit, formerly "Frobisher Bay", on Baffin Island in the east, was chosen by the 1995 Nunavut capital plebiscite. Other major communities include the regional centres of Rankin Inlet and Cambridge Bay.

Nunavut includes Ellesmere Island in the far north, the eastern and southern portions of Victoria Island in the west, and all islands in Hudson Bay, James Bay and Ungava Bay, including the western portion of Killiniq Island in the southeast and Akimiski Island far to the south of the rest of the territory. Nunavut is Canada's only geopolitical region that is not connected to the rest of North America via the Pan-American Highway.

Nunavut is the least densely populated major country sub-division in the world, not considering Antarctica, being even less densely populated than Greenland. With a population of 36,858 as of the 2021 Canadian census, up from 35,944 in 2016, consisting mostly of Inuit, and a land mass almost as large as Mexico, Nunavut's land area of 1,836,993.78 km^{2} (709,267.26 sq mi) has a population density of 0.022/km^{2} (0.056/sq mi).

Alert, Nunavut, is the world's northernmost continuously inhabited place. Eureka, a weather station on Ellesmere Island, has the lowest average annual temperature of any Canadian weather station.

== History ==
=== Early history ===
The region which is now mainland Nunavut was first populated approximately 4,500 years ago by the Pre-Dorset, a diverse Paleo-Eskimo culture that migrated eastward from the Bering Strait region.

The Pre-Dorset culture was succeeded by the Dorset culture about 2,800 years ago. Anthropologists and historians believe that the Dorset culture developed from the Pre-Dorset.

Helluland, which Norse explorers described visiting in their Sagas of Icelanders, has been associated with Nunavut's Baffin Island. Claims of contact between the Dorset and Norse are controversial.

The Thule people, ancestors of the modern Inuit, began migrating from Alaska in the 11th century into the Northwest Territories and Nunavut. By 1300, the geographic extent of Thule settlement included most of modern Nunavut.

The migration of the Thule people coincides with the decline of the Dorset. Thule people genetically and culturally completely replaced Dorset some time after 1300.

A map showing Thule migration and Dorset decline

=== European exploration ===
The earliest written historical account of the area is dated to 1576, an account by English explorer Martin Frobisher. While leading an expedition to find the Northwest Passage, Frobisher thought he had discovered gold ore around the body of water now known as Frobisher Bay on the coast of Baffin Island. The ore turned out to be worthless, but Frobisher made the first recorded European contact with the Inuit. Other explorers in search of the elusive Northwest Passage followed in the 17th century, including Henry Hudson, William Baffin and Robert Bylot.

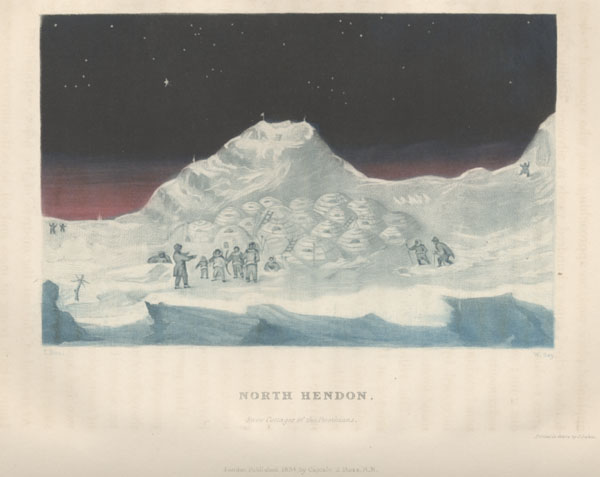
A depiction of an Inuit settlement on Boothia Peninsula in the 1830s, during John Ross' second expedition to find the Northwest Passage

=== 20th and 21st centuries ===
Cornwallis and Ellesmere Islands featured in the history of the Cold War in the 1950s. Concerned about the area's strategic geopolitical position, the federal government, as part of the High Arctic relocation, relocated Inuit from Nunavik (northern Quebec) to Resolute and Grise Fiord. In the unfamiliar and hostile conditions, they faced starvation but were forced to stay. Forty years later, the Royal Commission on Aboriginal Peoples issued a 1994 report titled The High Arctic Relocation: A Report on the 1953–55 Relocation. The government paid compensation to those affected and their descendants. On August 18, 2010, in Inukjuak, the Honourable John Duncan, PC, MP, previously Minister of Indian Affairs and Northern Development and Federal Interlocutor for Métis and Non-Status Indians, formally apologized on behalf of the Government of Canada for the High Arctic relocation.

Discussions on dividing the Northwest Territories along ethnic lines began in the 1950s, and legislation to achieve this was introduced in 1963. After its failure, a federal commission recommended against such a measure.

In the 1970s, activism increased among the Inuit, First Nations, and Innu peoples for recognition of their forced assimilation. In 1976, as part of the land claims negotiations between the Inuit Tapiriit Kanatami (then called the "Inuit Tapirisat of Canada") and the federal government, the parties discussed division of the Northwest Territories to provide a separate territory for the Inuit. On April 14, 1982, a plebiscite on division was held throughout the Northwest Territories. A majority of the residents voted in favour and the federal government gave a conditional agreement seven months later.

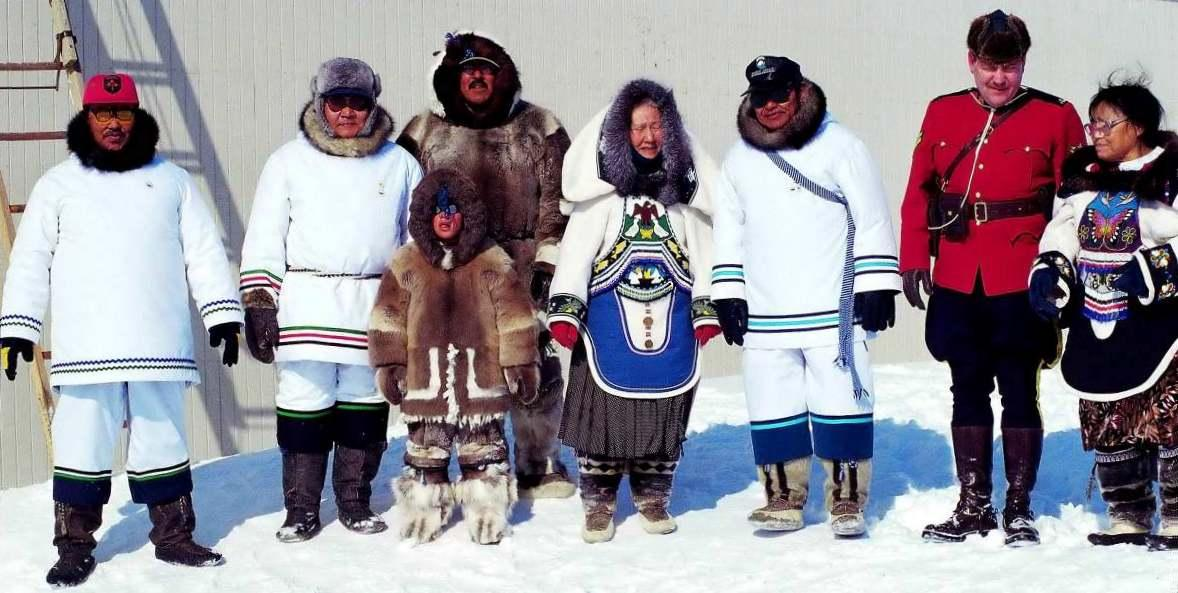
A ceremony commemorating the establishment of Nunavut, April 1999

The land claims agreement was completed in September 1992 and ratified by nearly 85% of the voters in Nunavut in a referendum. On July 9, 1993, the Nunavut Land Claims Agreement Act and the Nunavut Act were passed by the Canadian Parliament. The transition to establish Nunavut Territory was completed on April 1, 1999. On January 18, 2024, the federal and territorial governments signed the Nunavut Lands and Resources Devolution Agreement; it gives the government of Nunavut control over the territory's land and resources.

In 2020, Nunavut imposed strict travel regulations in order to prevent an outbreak of the COVID-19 pandemic. The government barred entry to almost all non-residents. On November 6, 2020, Nunavut confirmed its first case in Sanikiluaq, having previously been the only place in North America to have had no cases of COVID-19.

== Geography ==
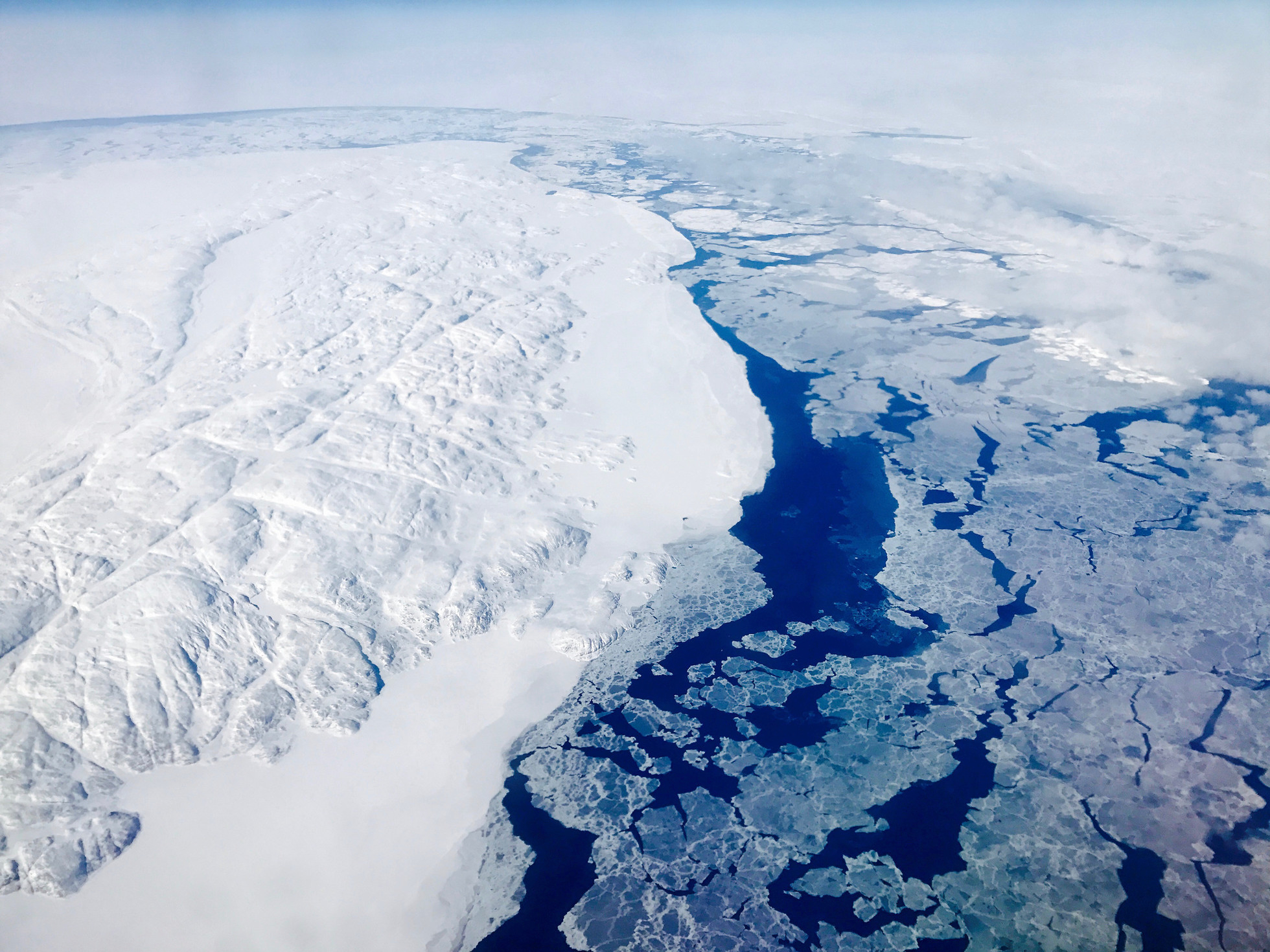
An aerial photo of Nunavut near the Roes Welcome Sound, April 2017

Nunavut covers 1,836,993.78 km^{2} (709,267.26 sq mi) of land and 160,930 km^{2} (62,137 sq mi) of water in Northern Canada. The territory includes a substantial part of the mainland, most of the Arctic Archipelago, and the waters and islands of Hudson Bay, James Bay, and Ungava Bay; this includes the distant Belcher Islands and Akimiski Island, which were part of the Northwest Territories from which Nunavut was separated. This makes it the fifth-largest subnational entity or administrative division in the world. If Nunavut were a country, it would rank 15th in area.

Nunavut has long land borders with the Northwest Territories on the mainland and a few Arctic islands, and with Manitoba to the south of the Nunavut mainland; it also meets Saskatchewan to the southwest at a quadripoint, and has a short land border with Newfoundland and Labrador on Killiniq Island. It has very small land borders with Ontario and Quebec via exclaves on the James Bay coast. The boundary with the Northwest Territories roughly approximates the tree line in Canada.

Nunavut shares maritime borders with the provinces of Quebec, Ontario, and Manitoba. These run along the shoreline of those provinces to include the entirety of the involved bays under Nunavut jurisdiction, rather than the usual arrangement of running through the middle of a body of water. With Greenland, a constituent country of the Danish Realm, it shares a primarily maritime international border that includes a short land border on Hans Island.

Nunavut's highest point is Barbeau Peak (2,616 m [8,583 ft]) on Ellesmere Island. The population density is 0.022/km^{2} (0.056/sq mi), one of the lowest in the world. By comparison, Greenland has approximately the same area and nearly twice the population.

=== Climate ===
Köppen climate types in Nunavut

Nunavut has a polar climate in most regions, owing to its high latitude and lower continental summertime influence than areas to the west. In more southerly continental areas, very cold subarctic climates can be found, due to July being slightly milder than the required 10 °C (50 °F).

Average daily maximum and minimum temperatures for selected locations in Nunavut
City	July (°C)		July (°F)		January (°C)		January (°F)	
	High	Low	High	Low	High	Low	High	Low
Alert	6	1	43	33	−29	−36	−20	−33
Baker Lake	17	6	63	43	−28	−35	−18	−31
Cambridge Bay	13	5	55	41	−29	−35	−19	−32
Eureka	9	3	49	37	−33	−40	−27	−40
Iqaluit	12	4	54	39	−23	−31	−9	−24
Kugluktuk	16	6	60	43	−23	−31	−10	−25
Rankin Inlet	15	6	59	43	−27	−34	−17	−30

Climate data for Iqaluit (Iqaluit Airport) WMO ID: 71909; coordinates 63°45′N 68°33′W; elevation: 33.5 m (110 ft); 1991–2020 normals, extremes 1946–present
Month	Jan	Feb	Mar	Apr	May	Jun	Jul	Aug	Sep	Oct	Nov	Dec	Year
Record high humidex	3.3	5.2	4.3	6.8	13.3	21.7	27.8	27.6	18.8	8.6	4.8	3.4	27.8
Record high °C (°F)	3.9 (39.0)	5.7 (42.3)	4.2 (39.6)	7.2 (45.0)	13.3 (55.9)	22.7 (72.9)	26.8 (80.2)	25.5 (77.9)	18.4 (65.1)	9.1 (48.4)	5.6 (42.1)	3.8 (38.8)	26.8 (80.2)
Mean daily maximum °C (°F)	−22.0 (−7.6)	−22.9 (−9.2)	−17.6 (0.3)	−8.9 (16.0)	−0.3 (31.5)	7.0 (44.6)	12.0 (53.6)	11.1 (52.0)	5.6 (42.1)	−0.5 (31.1)	−7.5 (18.5)	−14.7 (5.5)	−4.9 (23.2)
Daily mean °C (°F)	−26.0 (−14.8)	−27.0 (−16.6)	−22.4 (−8.3)	−13.5 (7.7)	−3.2 (26.2)	3.9 (39.0)	8.1 (46.6)	7.5 (45.5)	2.9 (37.2)	−3.2 (26.2)	−11.1 (12.0)	−18.9 (−2.0)	−8.6 (16.5)
Mean daily minimum °C (°F)	−29.9 (−21.8)	−31.0 (−23.8)	−27.2 (−17.0)	−18.1 (−0.6)	−6.1 (21.0)	0.7 (33.3)	4.2 (39.6)	3.8 (38.8)	0.2 (32.4)	−5.8 (21.6)	−14.7 (5.5)	−23.0 (−9.4)	−12.2 (10.0)
Record low °C (°F)	−45.0 (−49.0)	−49.0 (−56.2)	−44.7 (−48.5)	−34.2 (−29.6)	−26.1 (−15.0)	−10.2 (13.6)	−2.8 (27.0)	−2.5 (27.5)	−12.8 (9.0)	−27.1 (−16.8)	−36.2 (−33.2)	−43.4 (−46.1)	−49.0 (−56.2)
Record low wind chill	−65.5	−66.4	−62.1	−53.1	−36.0	−18.8	−7.2	−8.6	−18.6	−42.9	−56.8	−60.1	−66.4
Average precipitation mm (inches)	16.3 (0.64)	14.0 (0.55)	21.4 (0.84)	22.7 (0.89)	21.0 (0.83)	48.7 (1.92)	39.8 (1.57)	61.7 (2.43)	50.8 (2.00)	30.2 (1.19)	18.5 (0.73)	16.2 (0.64)	361.2 (14.22)
Average rainfall mm (inches)	0.4 (0.02)	0.1 (0.00)	0.0 (0.0)	0.0 (0.0)	3.3 (0.13)	46.1 (1.81)	44.4 (1.75)	65.5 (2.58)	43.9 (1.73)	12.3 (0.48)	0.7 (0.03)	0.0 (0.0)	216.6 (8.53)
Average snowfall cm (inches)	19.4 (7.6)	15.1 (5.9)	20.6 (8.1)	23.8 (9.4)	23.0 (9.1)	3.8 (1.5)	0.0 (0.0)	0.1 (0.0)	8.5 (3.3)	21.1 (8.3)	25.9 (10.2)	28.8 (11.3)	190.0 (74.8)
Average precipitation days (≥ 0.2 mm)	12.1	10.7	12.4	12.8	10.6	12.3	12.4	14.3	15.7	13.2	12.5	12.8	151.5
Average rainy days (≥ 0.2 mm)	0.06	0.06	0.06	0.06	1.7	10.7	13.1	14.8	13.2	3.8	0.24	0.0	57.7
Average snowy days (≥ 0.2 cm)	10.1	8.8	8.7	9.6	8.7	2.1	0.06	0.12	3.7	9.8	11.9	12.7	86.3
Average relative humidity (%) (at 1500 LST)	68.1	67.6	68.9	74.6	77.3	74.6	72.9	73.5	75.2	78.7	78.4	74.3	73.7
Mean monthly sunshine hours	32.4	94.0	172.2	216.5	180.5	200.2	236.8	156.8	87.9	51.4	35.6	12.6	1,476.8
Percentage possible sunshine	18.5	39.0	47.4	48.2	31.9	32.5	39.3	31.0	22.4	16.8	17.7	8.9	29.5
Average ultraviolet index	0	0	1	2	4	4	4	3	2	1	0	0	2
Source: Environment and Climate Change Canada (sunshine 1981–2010 from ECCC) (ultraviolet index from Weather Atlas)

== Demography ==
Visible minority and Indigenous identity (2021):
1. Inuit (84.3%)
2. Non-Indigenous (10.6%)
3. Visible minority (3.60%)
4. First Nations (0.50%)
5. Métis (0.30%)
6. Other Indigenous responses (0.60%)

Nunavut had a population of 36,858 in the 2021 census. In 2021, 30,865 people identified as Inuit (84.3% of the total population), 180 as First Nations (0.5%), 120 as Métis (0.3%), 230 with multiple or other Indigenous responses (0.6%), and 5,210 as non-Indigenous (14.2%).

Most populous communities
Municipality	2021	2016	2011	Change 2011–2021	Refs.
Iqaluit	7,429	7,740	6,699	10.9%	
Rankin Inlet	2,975	2,842	2,557	16.2%	
Arviat	2,864	2,657	2,060	39.0%	
Baker Lake	2,061	2,069	1,728	19.3%	
Igloolik	2,049	1,744	1,538	33.2%	
Cambridge Bay	1,760	1,766	1,452	21.2%	
Pond Inlet	1,555	1,617	1,315	18.3%	
Pangnirtung	1,504	1,481	1,325	13.5%	
Kinngait	1,396	1,441	1,363	2.4%	
Kugluktuk	1,382	1,491	1,302	6.1%	

The population growth rate of Nunavut has been well above the Canadian average for several decades, mostly due to birth rates significantly higher than the Canadian average—a trend that continues. Between 2011 and 2016, Nunavut had the highest population growth rate of any Canadian province or territory, at a rate of 12.7%. The second-highest was Alberta, with a growth rate of 11.6%. Between 2016 and 2021, the population growth increased by 2.5% (the third lowest), a decrease of 10.2 percentiles from the previous census.

=== Language ===
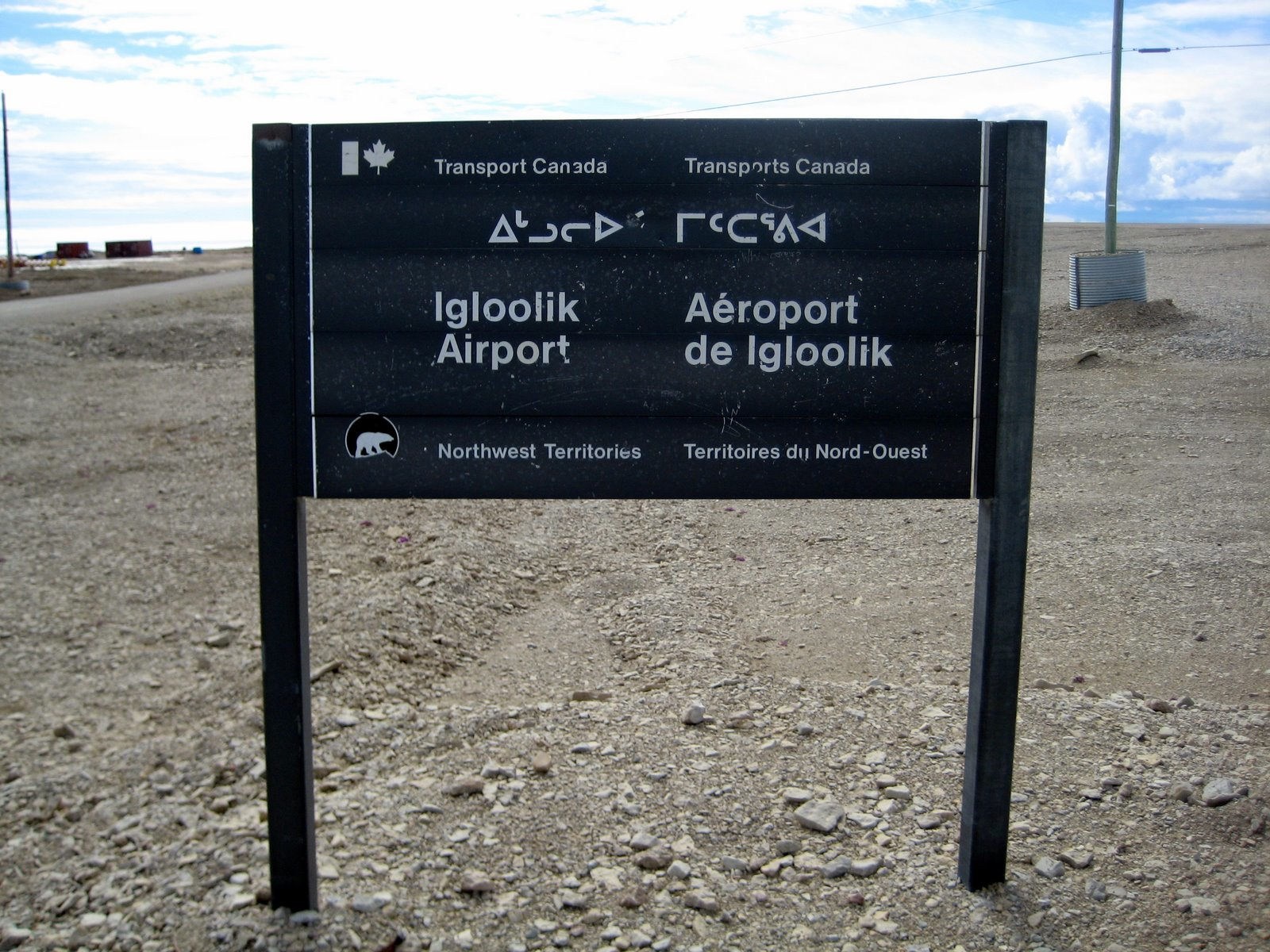
An entrance sign to Igloolik Airport, with text in Inuktitut, English, and French. (Note: "Northwest Territories" is written at the bottom, as the sign predates the creation of Nunavut.)

Official languages are the Inuit language (Inuktitut and Inuinnaqtun), known as Inuktut, English, and French.

In his 2000 commissioned report (Aajiiqatigiingniq Language of Instruction Research Paper) to the Nunavut Department of Education, Ian Martin of York University said that a "long-term threat to Inuit languages from English is found everywhere, and current school language policies and practices on language are contributing to that threat" if Nunavut schools follow the Northwest Territories model. He provided a 20-year language plan to create a "fully functional bilingual society, in Inuktitut and English" by 2020.

The plan provided different models, including:

- "Qulliq Model", for most Nunavut communities, with Inuktitut to be the main language of instruction.
- "Inuinnaqtun Immersion Model", for language reclamation and immersion to revitalize Inuinnaqtun as a living language.
- "Mixed Population Model", mainly for Iqaluit (possibly for Rankin Inlet), where the population is 40% Qallunaat, or non-Inuit, and may have different requirements.

Of the 34,960 responses to the census question concerning "mother tongue" in the 2016 census, the most commonly reported languages in Nunavut were:

Mother tongue
Rank	Language	Number of respondents	Percentage
1	Inuktitut	22,070	63.1%
2	English	11,020	31.5%
3	French	595	1.7%
4	Inuinnaqtun	495	1.4%

At the time of the census, only English and French were counted as official languages. Figures shown are for single-language responses and the percentage of total single-language responses.

In the 2016 census, it was reported that 2,045 people (5.8%) living in Nunavut did not know either of the official languages of Canada (English or French). The 2016 census also reported that of the 30,135 Inuit in Nunavut, 90.7% could speak either Inuktitut or Inuinnaqtun.

=== Religion ===
In the 2021 census, Christianity (mainly Anglicanism) constituted 73.5% of Nunavut's population, down from 86% in the 2011 Census. The percentage of population which is non-religious has grown from 13% in 2011 to 24.9% in 2021 Census. About 1.6% of the population reported another religious affiliation including Aboriginal spirituality, Hinduism, Islam, Buddhism, and others.

== Economy ==
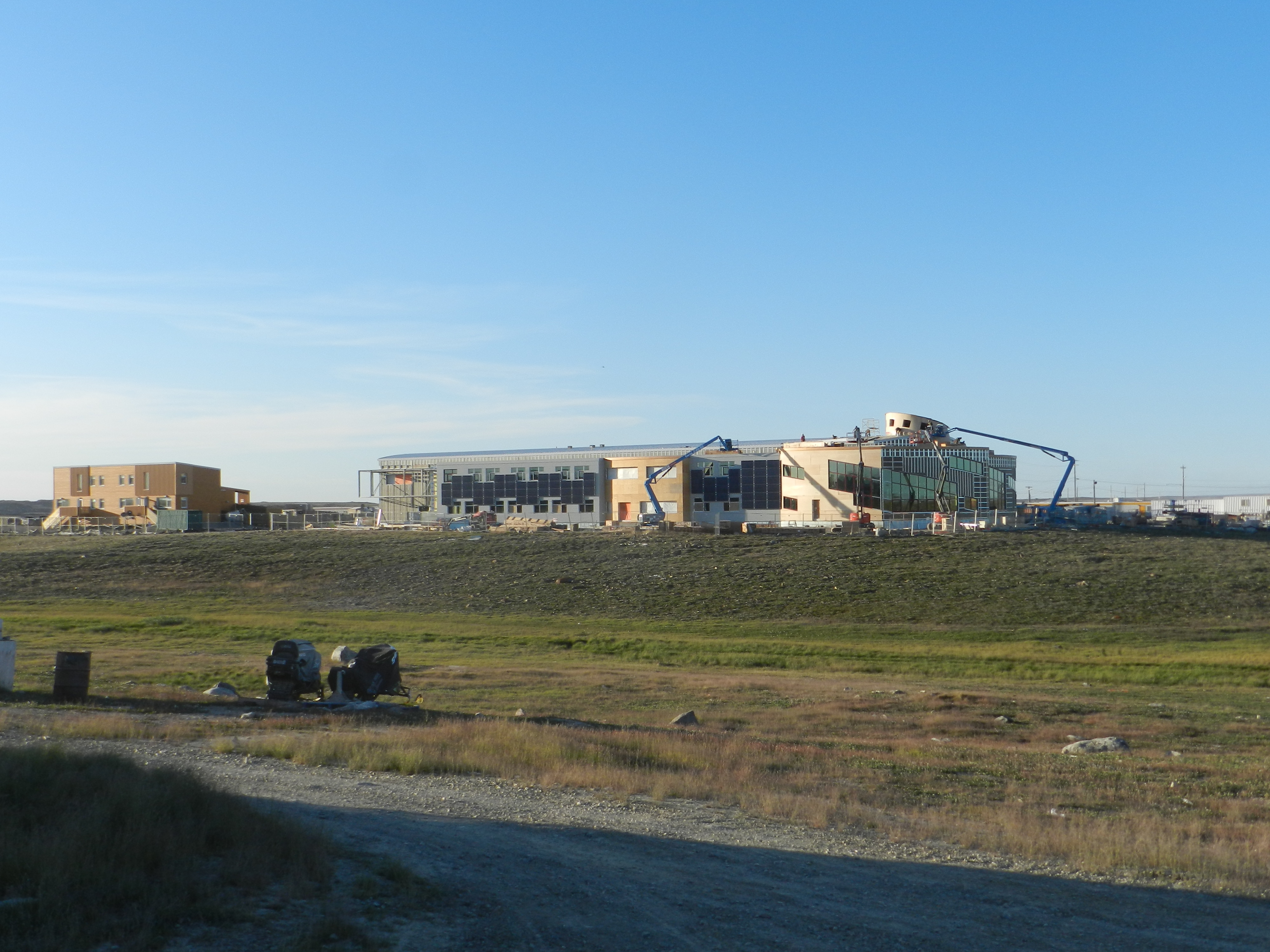
CHARS is one of several Arctic research stations in Nunavut.

The economy of Nunavut is driven by the Inuit and Territorial Government, mining, oil, gas, and mineral exploration, arts, crafts, hunting, fishing, whaling, tourism, transportation, housing development, military, research, and education. One college operates in Nunavut, the Nunavut Arctic College, and several Arctic research stations are located within the territory. The new Canadian High Arctic Research Station CHARS is planning for Cambridge Bay and high north Alert Bay Station.

Iqaluit hosts the annual Nunavut Mining Symposium every April, a trade show that showcases the many economic activities ongoing in Nunavut.

Baffinland Iron Mines Corporation, the operator of the Mary River Mine, is the territory's largest private sector employer with more than 2,600 workers, and accounted for 23 per cent of Nunavut's economic activity in 2019.

=== Mining ===
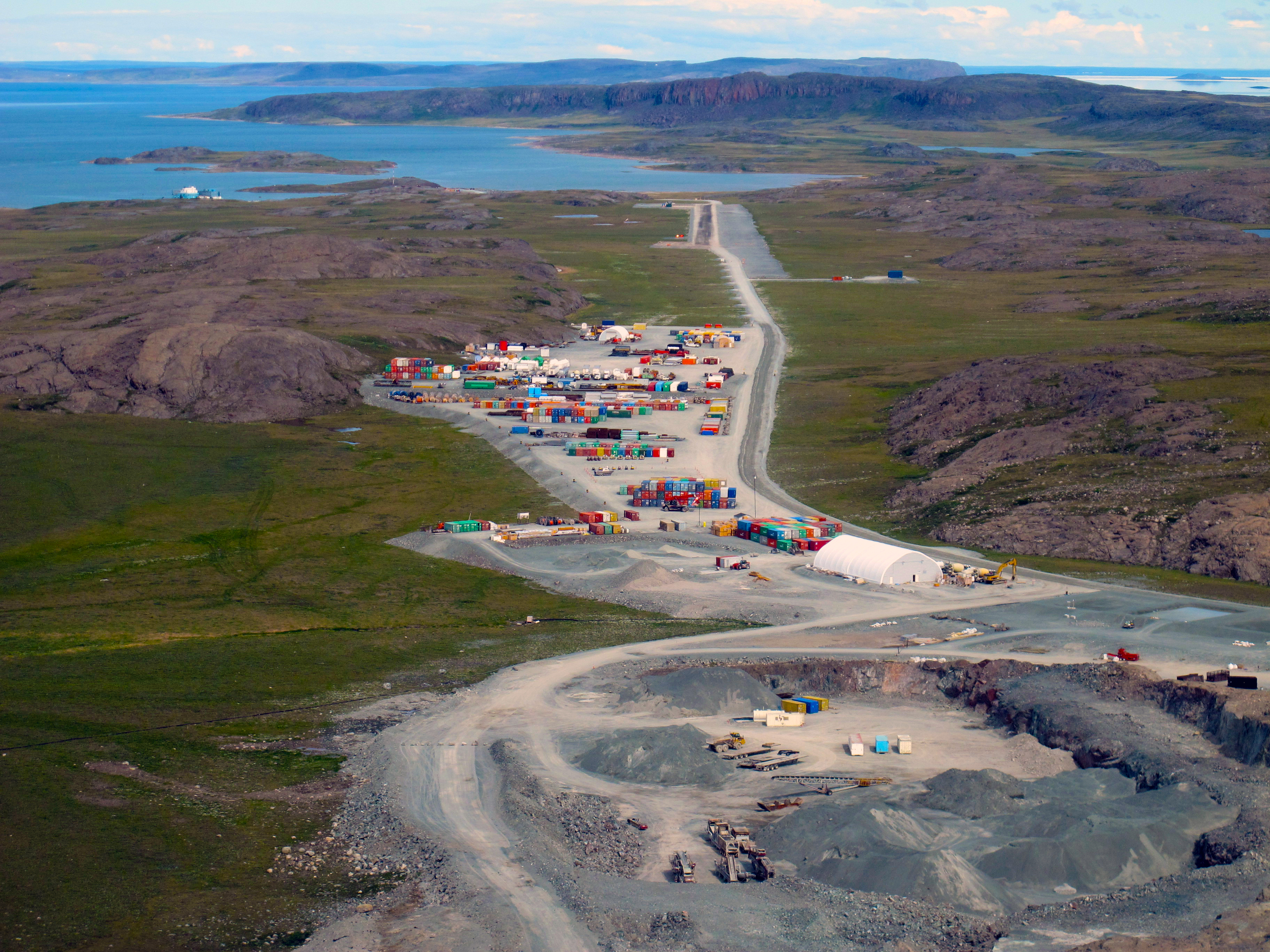
The Hope Bay gold mine is one of three major mines in the territory.

There are three major mines in operation in Nunavut. Agnico-Eagle Mines Ltd – Meadowbank Division. Meadowbank Gold Mine is an open pit gold mine with an estimated mine life 2010–2020 and employs around 680 people.

The second mine in production is the Mary River Iron Ore mine on northern Baffin Island, operated by Baffinland Iron Mines, which produces high-grade iron ore for direct export.

The most recent mine to open is Doris North or the Hope Bay Mine operated near Hope Bay Aerodrome by TMAC Resource Ltd. This new high grade gold mine is the first in a series of potential mines in gold occurrences all along the Hope Bay greenstone belt.

==== Mining projects ====
Name	Company	In the region of	Material
Amaruq and Meliadine Gold Projects	Agnico-Eagle	Rankin Inlet	Gold
Back River Project	B2Gold	Bathurst Inlet	Gold
Izok Corridor Project	MMG Resources Inc.	Kugluktuk	Gold, Copper, Silver, Zinc
Hackett River	Glencore	Kugluktuk	Copper, Lead, Silver, Zinc
Chidliak	De Beers Canada	Iqaluit / Pangnirtung	Diamonds
Committee Bay, Three Bluffs Gold Project	Fury Gold Mines	Naujaat	Gold
Kiggavik	Areva Resources	Baker Lake	Uranium
Roche Bay	Advanced Exploration	Hall Beach	Iron Ore
Ulu, Lupin	Blue Star Gold, Elgin Mining Ltd.	Contwoyto Lake – connected to Yellowknife with an ice road	Gold
Storm Copper Property	Aston Bay Holdings	Taloyoak	Copper

==== Historic mines ====
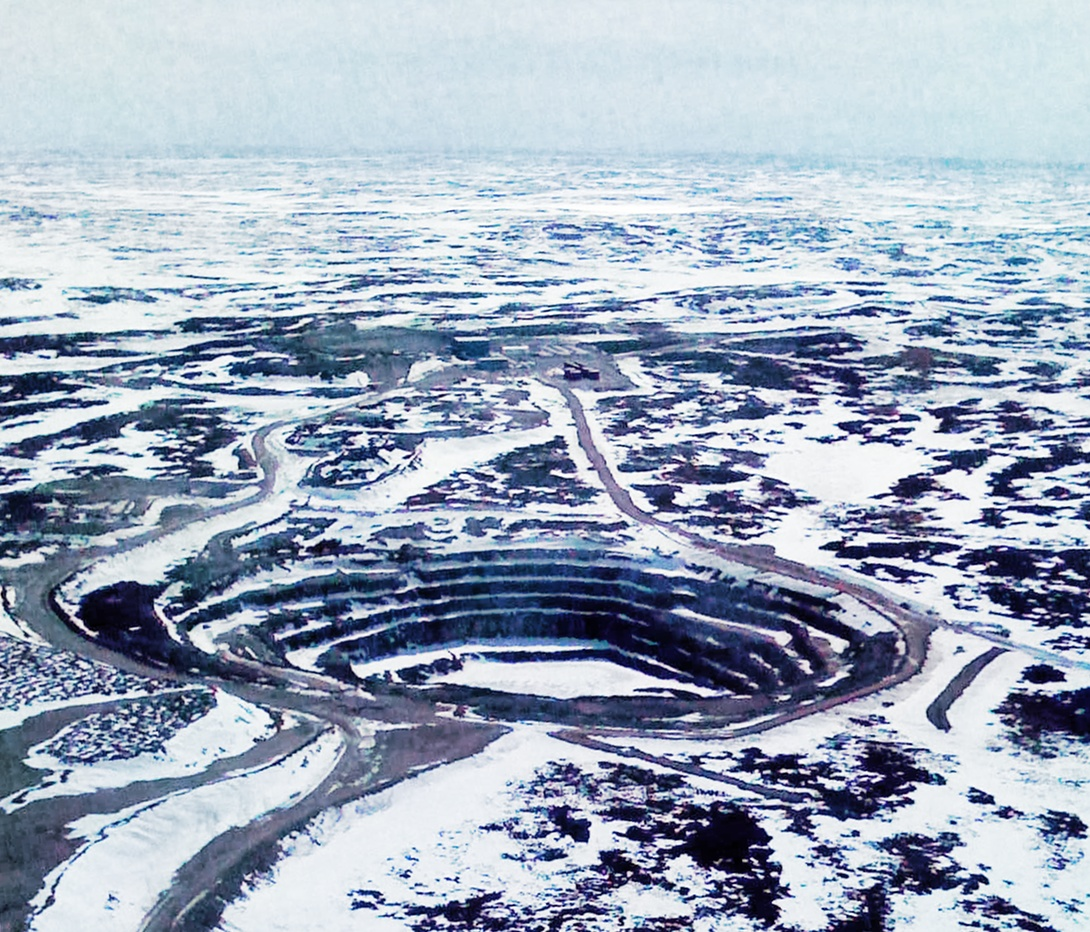
The Jericho Diamond Mine is a dormant mine in Nunavut, that operated from 2006 to 2008.

- Lupin Mine 1982–2005, gold, current owner Elgin Mining Ltd (located near the Northwest Territories boundary near Contwoyto Lake)
- Polaris Mine 1982–2002, lead and zinc (located on Little Cornwallis Island, not far from Resolute)
- Nanisivik Mine 1976–2002, lead and zinc, prior owner Breakwater Resources Ltd (near Arctic Bay) at Nanisivik
- Rankin Nickel Mine 1957–1962, nickel, copper and platinum group metals
- Jericho Diamond Mine 2006–2008, diamond (located 400 km (250 mi), northeast of Yellowknife) 2012 produced diamonds from existing stockpile. No new mining; closed.
- Doris North Gold Mine Newmont Mining approx 3 km (1.9 mi) underground drifting/mining, none milled or processed. Newmont closed the mine and sold it to TMAC Resources in 2013. TMAC has now reached commercial production in 2017.

=== Energy ===
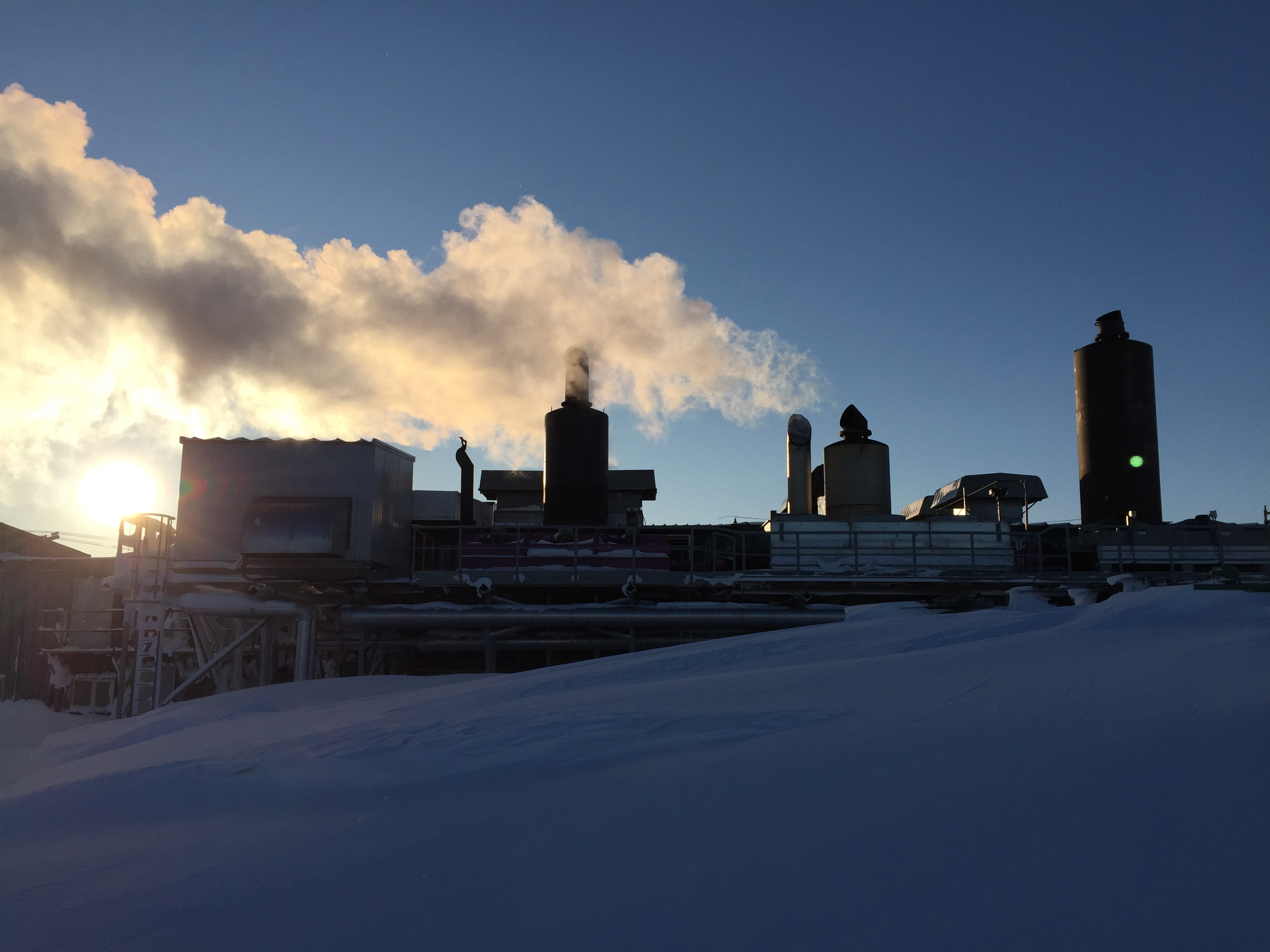
A power station powered by diesel fuel in Rankin Inlet

Nunavut's people rely primarily on diesel fuel to run generators and heat homes, with fossil fuel shipments from southern Canada by plane or boat because there are few to no roads or rail links to the region. There is a government effort to use more renewable energy sources, which is generally supported by the community.

This support comes from Nunavut feeling the effects of global warming. Former Nunavut Premier Eva Aariak said in 2011, "Climate change is very much upon us. It is affecting our hunters, the animals, the thinning of the ice is a big concern, as well as erosion from permafrost melting." The region is warming about twice as fast as the global average, according to the UN's Intergovernmental Panel on Climate Change.

=== Transportation ===
Northern Transportation Company Limited, owned by Norterra, a holding company that was, until April 1, 2014, jointly owned by the Inuvialuit of the Northwest Territories and the Inuit of Nunavut.

=== Tourism ===
In the second half of 2018, travellers visited Nunavut 134,000 times and spent $436 million. Two-thirds of those visits were by Nunavummiut (residents of Nunavut) travelling within the territory. The remaining came from outside other provinces or territories in Canada, or from abroad and spent $219 million. Travellers from Ontario make up the largest portion of visitors from outside the territory. The majority of visitors from outside of Nunavut are business travellers; in the second half of 2018 only 14% of visitors were in the territory for leisure. Tourism recreation in Nunavut include activities like dog sledding, snowmobiling, cultural festivals, hiking, arctic wildlife safaris and sea kayaking.

== Culture ==
=== Media ===
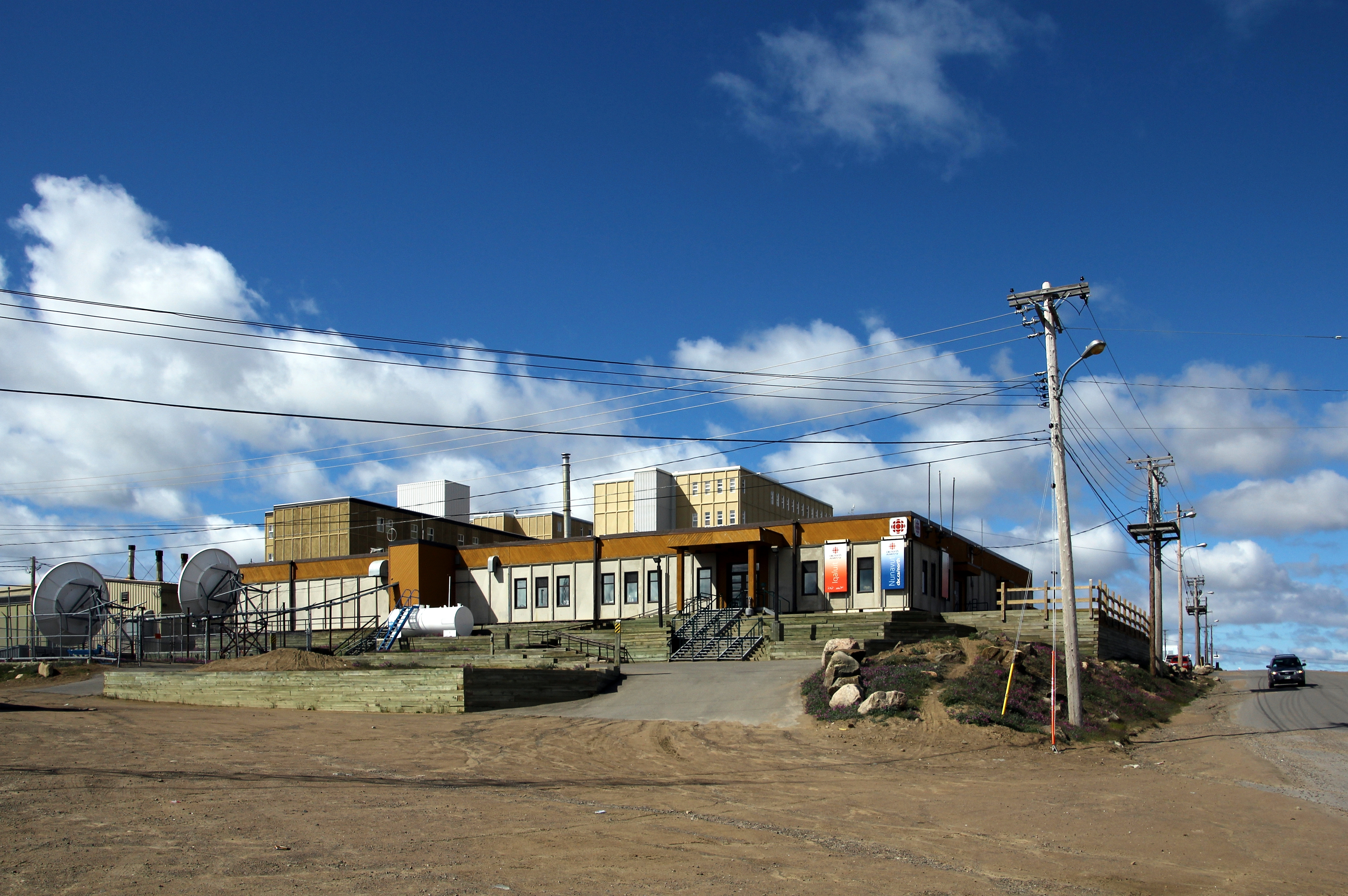
The former regional network centre for CBC North in Iqaluit

The Inuit Broadcasting Corporation is based in Nunavut. The Canadian Broadcasting Corporation (CBC) serves Nunavut through a radio and television production centre in Iqaluit, and a bureau in Rankin Inlet. Iqaluit is served by private commercial radio stations CKIQ-FM and CKGC-FM, both owned by Northern Lights Entertainment Inc. (CKIQ-FM had a rebroadcaster in Rankin Inlet that was discontinued in 2009.)

=== Periodicals ===
Nunavut is served by two regional weekly newspapers, Nunatsiaq News published by Nortext, and Nunavut News/North, published by Northern News Services, who also publish the multi-territory regional Kivalliq News.

==== Film ====
The film production company Isuma is based in Igloolik. Co-founded by Zacharias Kunuk and Norman Cohn in 1990, the company produced the 1999 feature Atanarjuat: The Fast Runner, winner of the Caméra d'Or for Best First Feature Film at the 2001 Cannes Film Festival. It was the first feature film written, directed, and acted entirely in Inuktitut.

The National Film Board (NFB) has released Animation from Cape Dorset (1973), a "collection assembles the first animated films to be made by Inuit artists at the NFB. Featured is work by Solomonie Pootoogook, Timmun Alariaq, Mathew Joanasie, and Itee Pootoogook Pilaloosie—all participants in the Kinngait (formerly Cape Dorset) Film Animation Workshop on Baffin Island."

In November 2006, the National Film Board of Canada (NFB) and the Inuit Broadcasting Corporation announced the start of the Nunavut Animation Lab, offering animation training to Nunavut artists at workshops in Iqaluit, Cape Dorset and Pangnirtung. Films from the Nunavut Animation Lab include Alethea Arnaquq-Baril's 2010 digital animation short Lumaajuuq, winner of the Best Aboriginal Award at the Golden Sheaf Awards and named Best Canadian Short Drama at the imagineNATIVE Film + Media Arts Festival.

In November 2011, the Government of Nunavut and the NFB jointly announced the launch of a DVD and online collection entitled Unikkausivut (Inuktitut: Sharing Our Stories), which will make over 100 NFB films by and about Inuit available in Inuktitut, Inuinnaqtun and other Inuit languages, as well as English and French. The Government of Nunavut is distributing Unikkausivut to every school in the territory.

=== Music ===
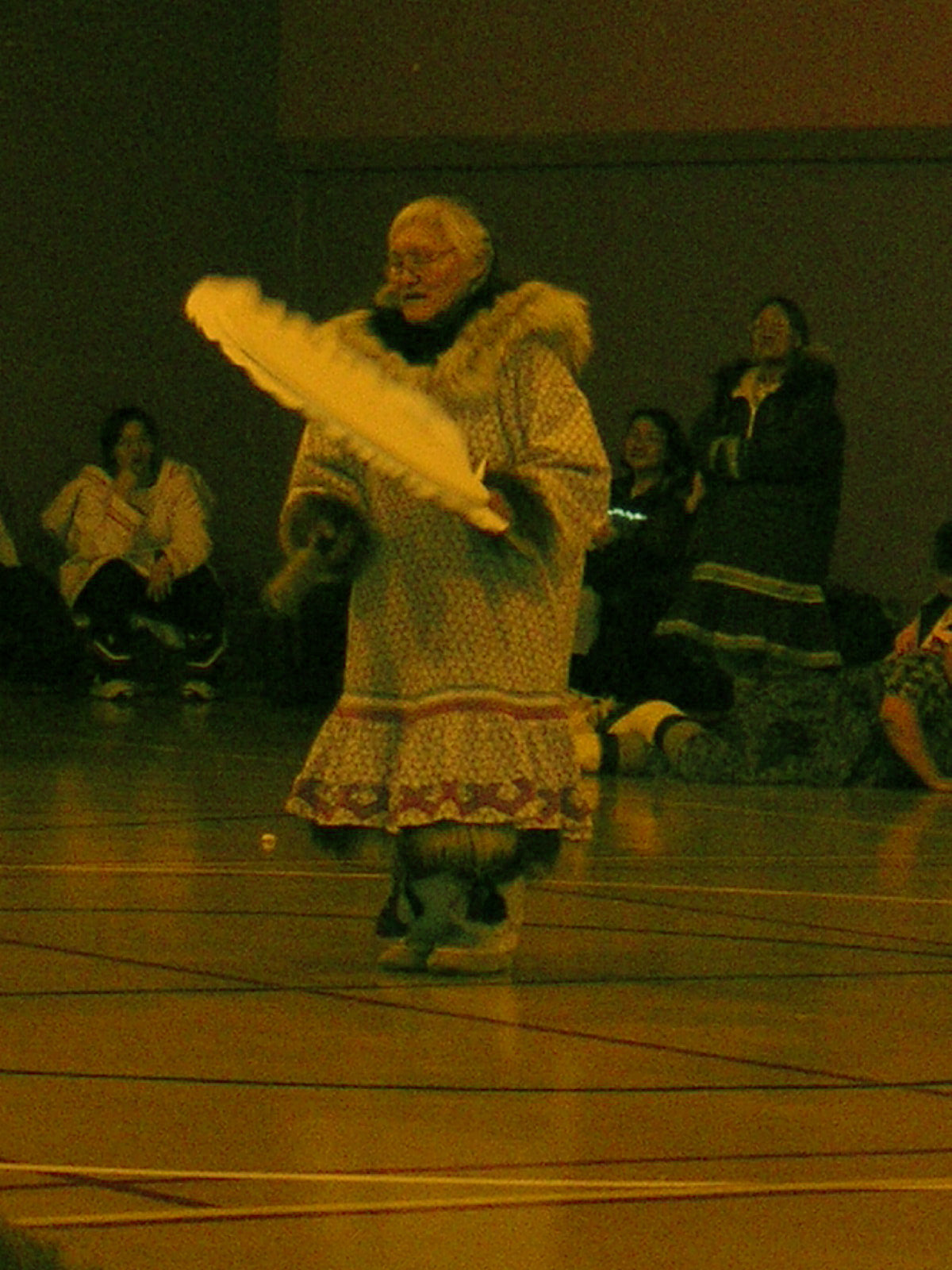
An Inuit drum dancer performing at Gjoa Haven

The music of Nunavut includes Inuit throat singing and drum-led dancing, along with country music, bluegrass, fiddling, square dancing and the button accordion from Austria.

=== Performing arts ===
Artcirq is a collective of Inuit circus performers based in Igloolik. The group has performed around the world, including at the 2010 Olympic Winter Games in Vancouver, British Columbia.

=== Sport ===
Nunavut competes at the Arctic Winter Games. Iqaluit co-hosted the 2002 edition in partnership with Nuuk, Greenland which were the first jointly hosted Arctic Winter Games. The Arctic Winter Games Arena was built to host hockey and speed skating events.

Hockey Nunavut was founded in 1999 and competes in the Maritime-Hockey North Junior C Championship.

== Government and politics ==
The commissioner of Nunavut is appointed by the Governor-in-Council, consisting of the governor general of Canada and the federal Cabinet. As in the other territories, the commissioner's role is symbolic and is analogous to that of a lieutenant-governor. While the commissioner is not a representative of the Canadian monarch, a role roughly analogous to representing the Crown has accrued to the position.

Nunavut elects a single member of the House of Commons of Canada. This makes Nunavut the second largest electoral district in the world by area after Greenland. Lori Idlout has been representing Nunavut district since the 2021 election. Originally elected from the New Democratic Party (NDP), she left the NDP and became a member of the Liberal Party in 2026.

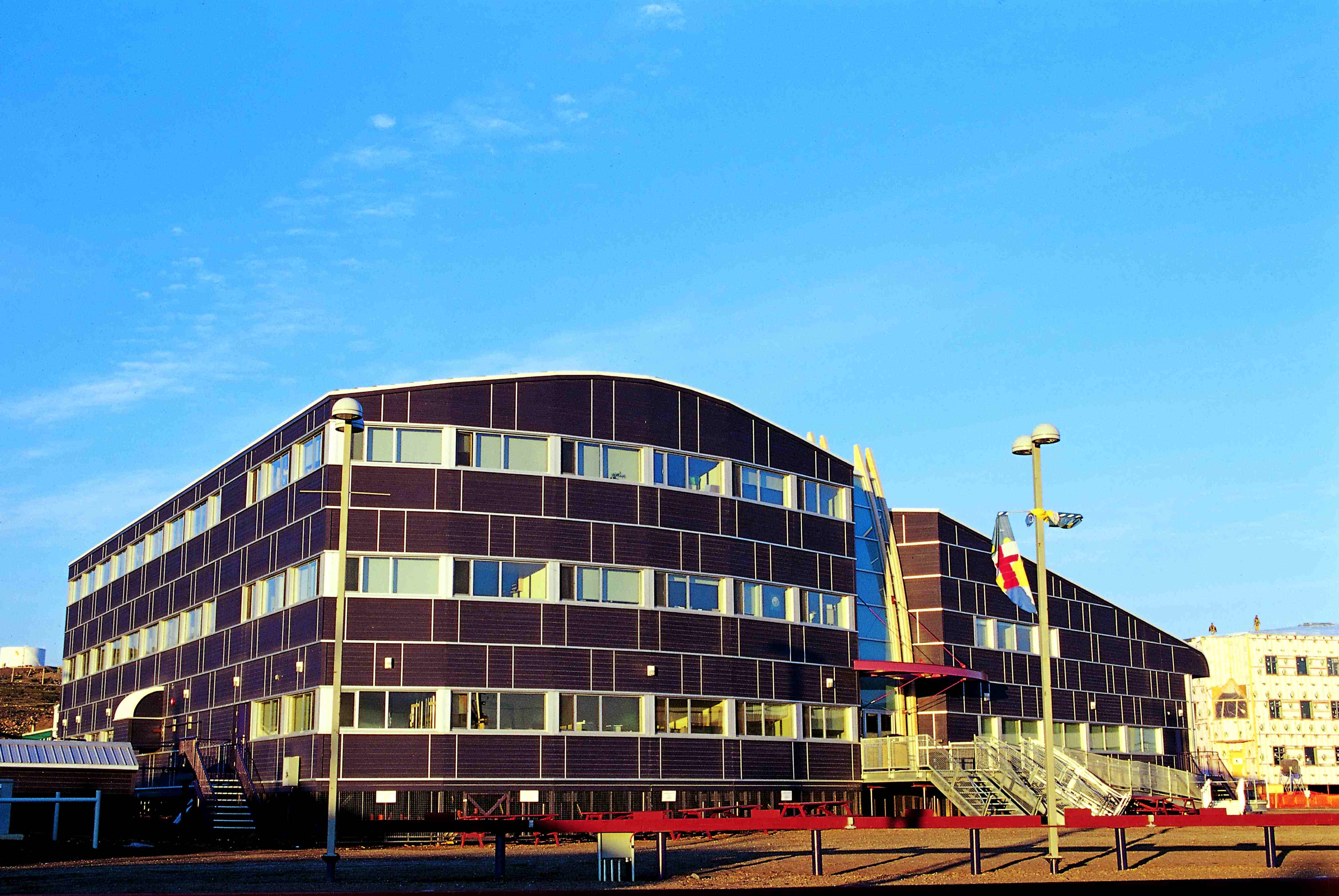
The Legislative Building of Nunavut in Iqaluit. The building is home to the territory's legislative assembly.

The members of the unicameral Legislative Assembly of Nunavut are elected individually; there are no parties and the legislature is consensus-based. The head of government, the premier of Nunavut, is elected by and from the members of the legislative assembly. The executive council, which includes the premier and eight ministers, is also elected by the Legislative Assembly from among the Assembly members. On June 14, 2018, Joe Savikataaq was elected as the premier, after his predecessor Paul Quassa lost a non-confidence motion. Former premier Paul Okalik set up an advisory council of eleven elders, whose function it is to help incorporate "Inuit Qaujimajatuqangit" (Inuit culture and traditional knowledge, often referred to in English as "IQ") into the territory's political and governmental decisions.

Due to the territory's small population and the fact that there are only a few hundred voters in each electoral district, the possibility of two election candidates finishing in an exact tie is significantly higher than in any Canadian province. This has actually happened twice in the five elections to date, with exact ties in Akulliq in the 2008 Nunavut general election and in Rankin Inlet South in the 2013 Nunavut general election. In such an event, Nunavut's practice is to schedule a follow-up by-election rather than choosing the winning candidate by an arbitrary method. The territory has also had numerous instances where MLAs were directly acclaimed to office as the only person to register their candidacy by the deadline, and one instance where a follow-up by-election had to be held due to no candidates registering for the regular election in their district at all.

Owing to Nunavut's vast size, the stated goal of the territorial government has been to decentralize governance beyond the region's capital. Three regions—Kitikmeot, Kivalliq and Qikiqtaaluk (formerly Baffin)—are the basis for more localized administration, although they lack autonomous governments of their own.

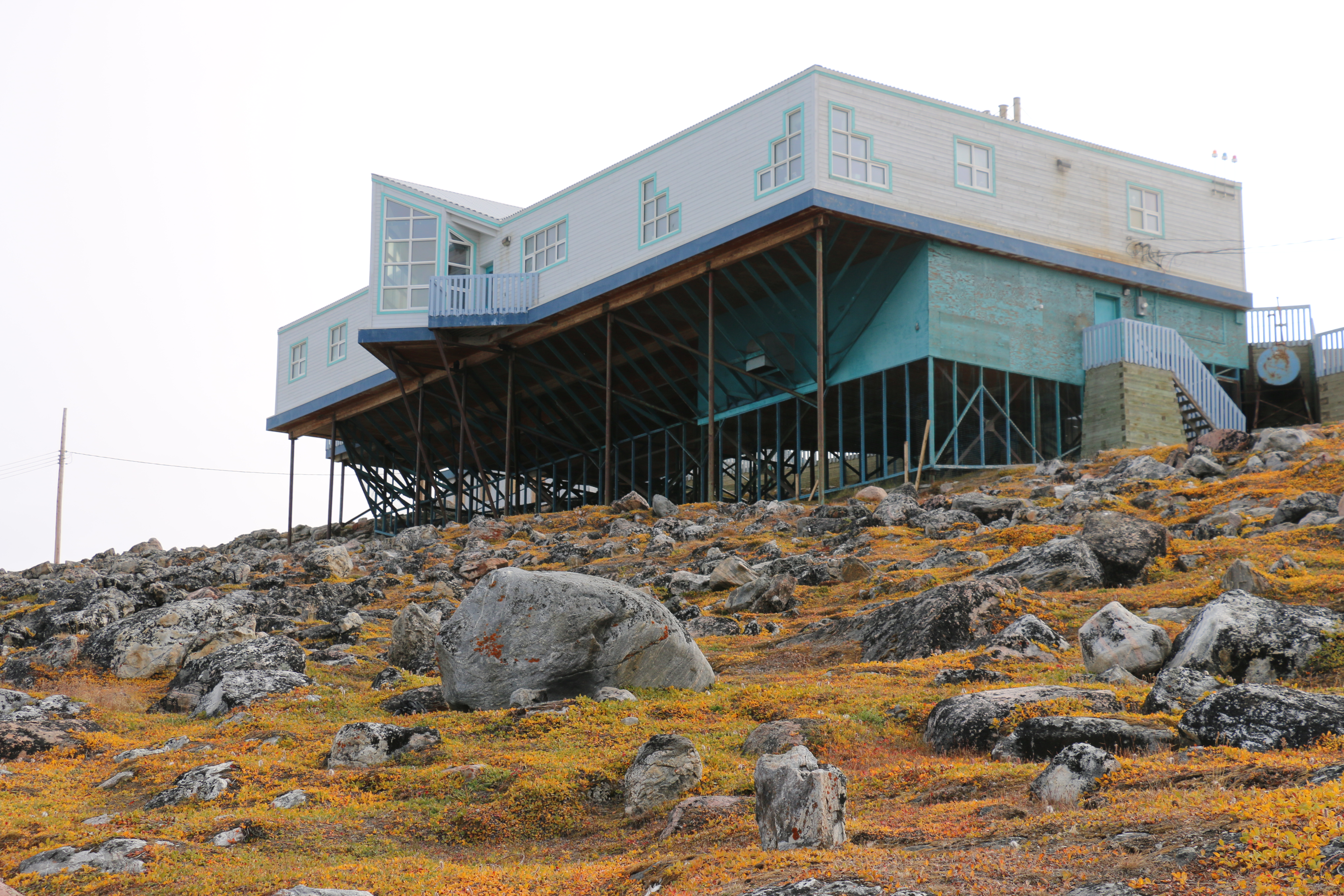
The Nattinnak Centre in Pond Inlet includes a branch of the Nunavut Public Library Services.

Qiniq, a satellite network company, provides broadband Internet access to 25 communities in Nunavut. There is a lack of competition in regards to internet service providers operating in Nunavut and demand for reliable internet exceeds capacity. The Nunavut Public Library Services, the public library system serving the territory, also provides various information services to the territory.

In September 2012, Premier Aariak welcomed Prince Edward and Sophie, Countess of Wessex, to Nunavut as part of the events marking the Diamond Jubilee of Queen Elizabeth II, Queen of Canada.

=== Administrative regions ===
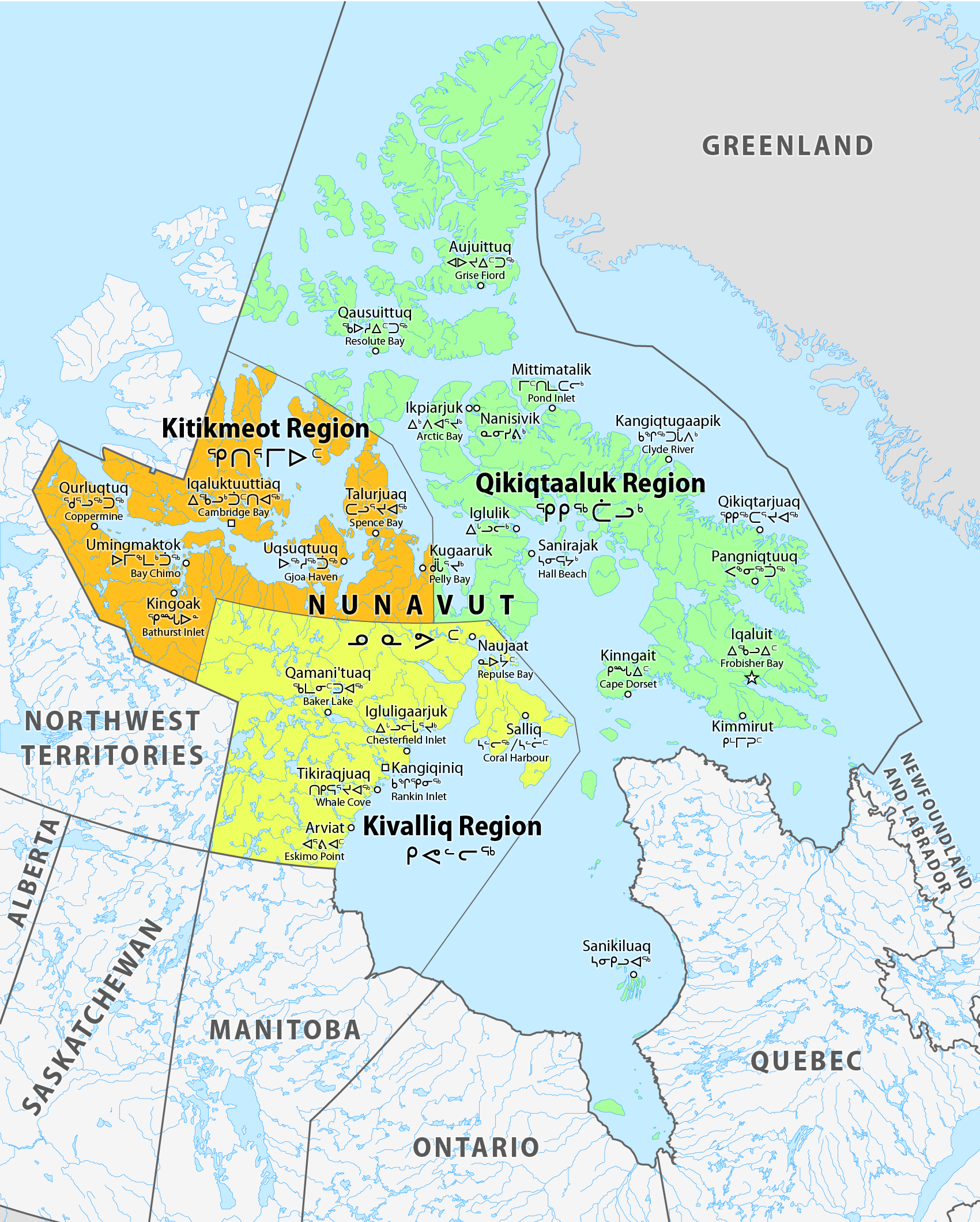
Administrative regions of Nunavut

Nunavut is divided into three administrative regions, the Kitikmeot Region, the Kivalliq Region, and the Qikiqtaaluk Region.

=== Licence plates ===
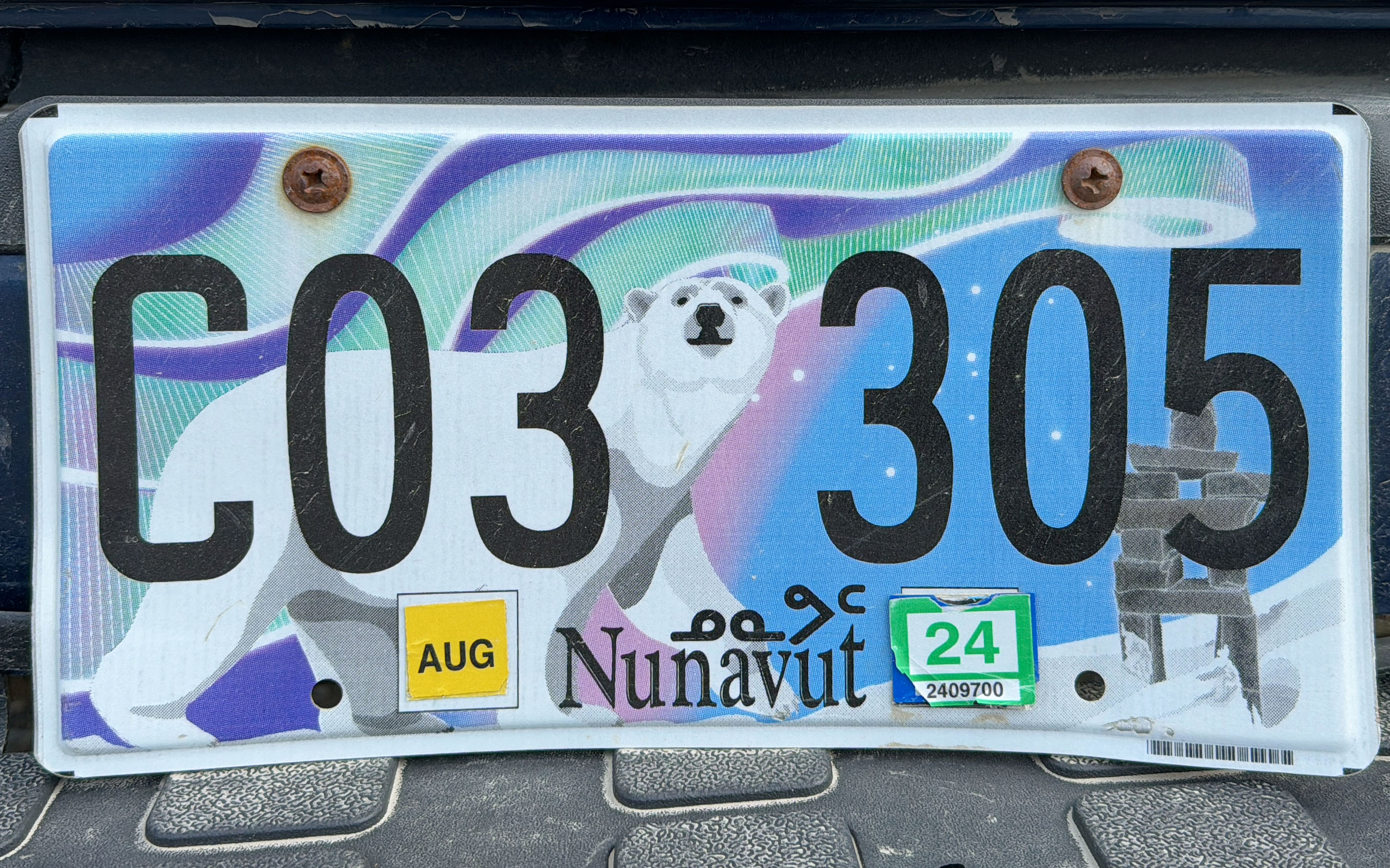
Nunavut’s license plate

The first design for Nunavut's licence plate was originally created for the Northwest Territories in the 1970s. The plate has long been famous worldwide for its unique design in the shape of a polar bear.

Nunavut was licensed by the NWT to use the same licence plate design in 1999 when it became a separate territory, but adopted its own plate design in March 2012 for launch in August 2012—a rectangle that prominently features the northern lights, a polar bear and an inuksuk.

=== Symbols ===
The flag and the coat of arms of Nunavut were designed by Andrew Qappik from Pangnirtung.

=== Territorial dispute ===
A long-simmering dispute between Canada and the U.S. involves the issue of Canadian sovereignty over the Northwest Passage.

=== Alcohol and tobacco ===
Due to prohibition laws influenced by local and traditional beliefs, Nunavut has a highly regulated alcohol market. The territory is the last outpost of prohibition in Canada, and it is often easier to obtain firearms than alcohol. Alcohol remains prohibited in six communities across the territory: Arivat, Coral Harbour, Gjoa Haven, Kugaaruk, Pangnirtung and Sanikiluaq.

Although every community in Nunavut has slightly differing regulations, as a whole it is still very restrictive. Seven communities have complete bans against alcohol and another 14 have orders being restricted by local committees. Due to these laws, a lucrative bootlegging market has appeared in which people mark up the prices of bottles by extraordinary amounts. The RCMP estimate Nunavut's bootleg liquor market rakes in some $10 million a year.

Despite the restrictions, alcohol's availability leads to widespread alcohol-related crime. One estimation states that some 95% of police calls are alcohol-related. Alcohol is also believed to be a contributing factor to the territory's high rates of violence, suicide, and homicide. A special task force created in 2010 to study and address the territory's increasing alcohol-related problems recommended the government ease alcohol restrictions. With prohibition shown to be highly ineffective historically, some believe these laws contribute to the territory's widespread social ills. Others are skeptical about the effectiveness of liquor sale liberalization and want to ban it completely. In 2014, Nunavut's government moved toward more legalization. In 2017, the first liquor store in 38 years opened in Iqaluit.

Nunavut has the highest smoking rate in all of Canada. More than half of its adult population smoke cigarettes, with both men and women smoking regularly. In 2016, some 90% of pregnant women were smokers.

== See also ==
- Archaeology of Nunavut
- List of communities in Nunavut
- List of municipalities in Nunavut
- Symbols of Nunavut
- Nunatsiavut
- Nunavik
