= WYML-LP =

Community radio station in Ingleside, Illinois, United States

- Ingleside, Illinois; United States
- Frequency: 99.9 MHz
- Branding: 99.9 WYML

Programming
- Format: Multiple (Community)

Ownership
- Owner: Local Community Broadcasting, Inc.

History
- First air date: January 2016

Technical information
- Licensing authority: FCC
- Facility ID: 195052
- Class: L1
- ERP: 0.1 kW
- HAAT: −3.64 m (−11.9 ft)
- Transmitter coordinates: 42°17′4.6″N 88°15′42.8″W

Links
- Public license information: LMS
- Website: wyml.us

WYML-LP is a low power community radio station, headquartered in Ingleside, Illinois and transmitting from Prairie Grove, Illinois. The station supports the eastern McHenry County and western Lake County areas, providing a mix of commercial and local music as well as community support for the businesses in the area.

WYML-LP started as a youth educational project in 2005, growing to a streaming and then an FM station, providing opportunities for education by relationships with the local schools (grade schools, high schools, trade schools and colleges).
