= WIZU-LP =

- Newark, Delaware; United States
- Frequency: 99.9 MHz
- Branding: Radio Newark

Programming
- Format: Science-focused talk

Ownership
- Owner: Newark Community Radio Inc

History
- Call sign meaning: Wise You

Technical information
- Licensing authority: FCC
- Facility ID: 193728
- Class: L1
- ERP: 85 watts
- HAAT: −4 metres (−13 ft)
- Transmitter coordinates: 39°39′51.1″N 75°45′35.8″W

Links
- Public license information: LMS
- Webcast: Listen Live
- Website: Official Website

WIZU-LP (99.9 FM) is a radio station licensed to serve the community of Newark, Delaware. The station is owned by Newark Community Radio Inc. It airs a science-focused talk radio format.

The station was assigned the WIZU-LP call letters by the Federal Communications Commission on February 14, 2014.

Radio Newark organized and facilitated communication between Delcastle Technical High School (New Castle County Vo-Tech School District) and Dr. Serena Auñon-Chancellor aboard the International Space Station as part of NASA's ARISS Program in October, 2018. The station coordinated a display of space suits provided by ILC Dover.
