= WZNC-LP =

- Bethlehem, New Hampshire; United States
- Frequency: 99.9 MHz
- Branding: NCCR - North Country Community Radio

Programming
- Format: Variety
- Affiliations: Pacifica Radio Network

Ownership
- Owner: Friends of the Colonial

Technical information
- Licensing authority: FCC
- Facility ID: 195474
- Class: LP1
- ERP: 100 watts
- HAAT: 8 metres (26 ft)
- Transmitter coordinates: 44°16′48.0″N 71°41′24.7″W

Links
- Public license information: LMS
- Webcast: Listen live
- Website: www.nococommunityradio.org

WZNC-LP (99.9 FM, "NCCR - North Country Community Radio") is a radio station licensed to serve the community of Bethlehem, New Hampshire. The station is owned by Friends of the Colonial and airs a variety format.

The station was assigned the WZNC-LP call letters by the Federal Communications Commission on February 25, 2014.
