= WRJL-FM =

Eva, Alabama; United States
- Broadcast area: Huntsville, Alabama
- Frequency: 99.9 MHz
- Branding: 99.9 All Gospel

Programming
- Format: Southern gospel

Ownership
- Owner: Rojo, Inc.

History
- First air date: May 31, 1996
- Call sign meaning: We Rejoice in Jesus our Lord

Technical information
- Licensing authority: FCC
- Facility ID: 57436
- Class: C3
- ERP: 25,000 watts
- HAAT: 97 meters (318 ft)
- Transmitter coordinates: 34°18′43″N 86°43′54″W

Links
- Public license information: Public file; LMS
- Website: wrjlfm.com

WRJL-FM (99.9 FM, "99.9 All Gospel") is a commercial radio station licensed to Eva, Alabama, United States. The station is owned by Rojo, Inc. It broadcasts a southern gospel music format that serves Huntsville, Alabama, and central North Alabama.

== History ==
This station received its original construction permit from the Federal Communications Commission on May 31, 1996. The new station was assigned the call letters WRJL-FM by the FCC on August 30, 1996. WRJL-FM received its license to cover from the FCC on November 2, 1999.

== Upgrades ==
In January 2006, the FCC issued a construction permit to allow WRJL-FM to upgrade from Class A to Class C3 and upgrade their 6,000 watt signal to an effective radiated power of 25,000 watts. The station received its license to cover these changes on February 13, 2009.
