= WOOP-LP =

- Cleveland, Tennessee; United States
- Frequency: 99.9 MHz
- Branding: America's Original Music

Programming
- Format: Country

Ownership
- Owner: Traditional Music Resource Center, Inc.

Technical information
- Licensing authority: FCC
- Facility ID: 134415
- Class: L1
- ERP: 9 watts
- HAAT: 94.7 meters (311 ft)
- Transmitter coordinates: 35°12′3.00″N 84°53′0.00″W

Links
- Public license information: LMS
- Webcast: Listen live
- Website: woopfm.com

WOOP-LP (99.9 FM, "America's Original Music") is a radio station broadcasting a country music format. Licensed to Cleveland, Tennessee, United States, the station is currently owned by Traditional Music Resource Center, Inc.
