= KGHO-LP =

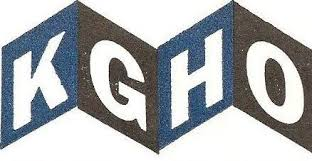
- Hoquiam, Washington; United States
- Frequency: 99.9 MHz
- Branding: Classic Rock and Roll

Programming
- Format: Oldies

Ownership
- Owner: Grays Harbor LPFM

History
- First air date: 2007 (at 98.5)
- Former frequencies: 98.5 MHz (2007–2015)
- Call sign meaning: Grays Harbor Original

Technical information
- Licensing authority: FCC
- Facility ID: 134721
- Class: L1
- ERP: 100 watts
- HAAT: 3.2 meters (10 ft)
- Transmitter coordinates: 46°58′22″N 123°51′10″W
- Translators: 92.7 K224DR (Aberdeen); 92.9 K225DI (Tacoma); 106.5 K293DE (Olympia)

Links
- Public license information: LMS

KGHO-LP (99.9 FM, "Classic Rock and Roll") is an American radio station broadcasting an oldies music format. Licensed to serve the Tacoma and Grays Harbor areas. The city of license community is Hoquiam, Washington, the station is currently owned by Grays Harbor LPFM.

"Northwest Rock n' Roll Preservation Society" operates community translators K224DR 92.7 in Aberdeen, K225DI 92.9 in Tacoma and K293DE 106.5 in Olympia, which carry KGHO-LP. Northwest Rock n' Roll also operates K266BM 101.1 in Olympia, which carries KUTI 680 AM.
