= WXJB =

Radio station in Homosassa, Florida

- Homosassa, Florida; United States
- Broadcast area: Nature Coast
- Frequency: 99.9 MHz
- Branding: The News and Talk of the Nature Coast

Programming
- Format: Talk radio
- Network: Fox News Radio
- Affiliations: Premiere Networks; Compass Media Networks; Westwood One

Ownership
- Owner: Hernando Broadcasting Company, Inc.; (George S. Flinn, Jr.)
- Sister stations: WWJB

History
- First air date: July 21, 2010
- Former call signs: WICE (CP: 2007); WWHF (CP: 2007–2010)

Technical information
- Licensing authority: FCC
- Facility ID: 170182
- Class: C3
- ERP: 9,200 watts
- HAAT: 163 meters (535 ft)
- Transmitter coordinates: 28°38′28″N 82°26′14″W

Links
- Public license information: Public file; LMS
- Webcast: Listen live
- Website: www.wxjbfm.com

WXJB (99.9 FM) is a commercial radio station licensed to Homosassa, Florida, United States, and serving the Nature Coast. It airs a talk format and is owned and operated by Hernando Broadcasting Company, Inc. The broadcast license is held by George S. Flinn, Jr. The studios and offices are on West Fort Dade Avenue in Brooksville.

The transmitter is off Ponce DeLeon Boulevard (U.S. Route 98) in Sugarmill Woods, Florida.

== History ==
In February 2007, broadcaster George S. Flinn, Jr., applied to the Federal Communications Commission (FCC) for a construction permit for a new FM radio station on the Nature Coast. The FCC granted this permit on June 29, 2007, with a scheduled expiration date of June 29, 2010. The new station was assigned the call letters WICE on September 3, 2007, then switched to WWHF on November 21, 2007. After construction and testing were completed in June 2010, the station got the call sign WXJB on June 29, 2010. The station was granted its broadcast license on July 21, 2010.

In 2015, the station received approval from the FCC to increase its effective radiated power to 25,000 watts. That power boost has not been put in place.

== Programming ==
Weekdays on WXJB include the Nature Coast Morning News, a local information and interview show. The rest of the schedule includes nationally syndicated conservative talk programs.
