= KCWN =

- New Sharon, Iowa; United States
- Broadcast area: Pella-Oskaloosa-Ottumwa,, Iowa
- Frequency: 99.9 (MHz)
- Branding: Where Hope Shines

Programming
- Format: Christian Contemporary

Ownership
- Owner: Crown Broadcasting Company

History
- First air date: October 1995

Technical information
- Licensing authority: FCC
- Class: C3
- ERP: 25,000 watts
- HAAT: 86 m (282 ft)
- Transmitter coordinates: 41°17′32″N 92°40′24″W

Links
- Public license information: Public file; LMS
- Website: KCWN website

KCWN (99.9 FM) is a commercial radio station that serves the area of Oskaloosa, Iowa, United States. The station primarily broadcasts a Christian contemporary format. KCWN is licensed to Crown Broadcasting Company.

The transmitter and broadcast tower are located west of Oskaloosa. According to the Antenna Structure Registration database, the tower is 93 m (305 ft) tall with the FM broadcast antenna mounted at the 83 m (272 ft) level. The calculated Height Above Average Terrain is 86 m (282 ft);
