= KMGG-LP =

- Albuquerque, New Mexico; United States
- Broadcast area: Albuquerque
- Frequency: 99.9 MHz (HD Radio)
- Branding: 99-9 The Beat

Programming
- Format: Urban adult contemporary
- Subchannels: HD2: Adult Contemporary "Sunny 99.9 HD-2"; HD3: Urban contemporary "Wild 99.9 HD-3"; HD4: Smooth Jazz "The Jazz Cafe"
- Affiliations: American Urban Radio Networks; Compass Media Networks

Ownership
- Owner: Future Broadcasters Inc.; (Byron Powdrell)

History
- First air date: July 2014

Technical information
- Licensing authority: FCC
- Facility ID: 192230
- Class: Low Power FM (LPFM)
- ERP: 100 watts
- HAAT: −6.8 meters (−22 ft)
- Transmitter coordinates: 35°5′52.3″N 106°29′58.2″W

Links
- Public license information: LMS
- Webcast: Listen Live; Listen Live (HD2); Listen Live (HD3); Listen Live (HD4)
- Website: 99thebeatfm.com

KMGG-LP is a low-power FM radio station based in Albuquerque, New Mexico broadcasting to the area at 100 watts from the east side of the city at 99.9 MHz. The signal can be received in much of the metro area. KMGG-LP is owned by Future Broadcasters Inc. a local non-profit organization. This station was granted an original construction permit on February 21, 2014 and assigned the call letters KMGG-LP. The station began broadcasting in early July 2014 branding as 99.9 The Beat with an Urban Adult Contemporary music format featuring mostly R&B hits from the 1970s to present. DeDe In The Morning a syndicated show that is featured weekdays 5-10 AM. Sunday Gospel with syndicated show Hezakiah Walker Countdown

KMGG-LP was started under the non-profit, Future Broadcasters Inc., which was started by Byron Powdrell (the station's licensee) to mentor children in the art of radio. 99.9 The Beat became Albuquerque's first successful non-profit, low-power radio station, and gave a platform for youth to facilitate their dreams and offer an educational S.T.E.M. experience right at home, all in an entertaining, fun format. 99.9 The Beat can offer local artists a place to present their art, which can be near impossible for an unknown artist to do at a commercial station.

== Current staff ==
Mornings: DeDe In The Morning 5-10a

Midday: Al B Love 10a - 2p

Afternoons: Baka Boyz Daily 3-7p

Weekends: Byron Powdrell Sunday Cruise, The Beat Staff

Weekends: DeDe's Weekend Kickback, Baka Boyz Mix Show 4-7, New Jack Radio 7-9 Tavis Smiley 9-12a
