= CHTC-FM =

Coordinates: 67°26′48″N 133°43′59″W

- Tsiigehtchic, Northwest Territories; Canada
- Frequency: 99.9 MHz

Ownership
- Owner: James Cardinal

Technical information
- Class: LP
- ERP: vertical polarization only: 45 watts
- HAAT: −10 meters (−33 ft)

CHTC-FM is a radio station that broadcasts on a frequency 99.9 FM in Tsiigehtchic, Northwest Territories, Canada.

The station is owned by James Cardinal.
