= KFMJ =

Radio station in Ketchikan, Alaska

- Ketchikan, Alaska; United States
- Broadcast area: Southeast Alaska; (The Alaska Panhandle)
- Frequency: 99.9 MHz
- Branding: The Rock

Programming
- Language: English
- Format: Classic hits
- Affiliations: Cumulus Media Networks; Premiere Networks; USA Radio Network

Ownership
- Owner: Steven Rhyner; (KFMJ Radio LLC)

History
- First air date: August 2, 1996; 29 years ago
- Call sign meaning: Ketchikan's Finest Music

Technical information
- Licensing authority: FCC
- Facility ID: 77778
- Class: A
- ERP: 115 watts
- HAAT: 681 meters
- Transmitter coordinates: 55°21′38.7″N 131°47′49″W

Links
- Public license information: Public file; LMS
- Webcast: Listen live
- Website: KFMJ Online

KFMJ is a full service, commercial, classic hits radio station in Ketchikan, Alaska. Broadcasting on 99.9 MHz FM, the station is owned by Steven Rhyner through licensee KFMJ Radio LLC. and was launched on August 2, 1996. One of two commercial broadcast FM stations licensed to broadcast from Ketchikan, KFMJ is the only locally owned commercial radio station.

KFMJ airs some programming from Cumulus Media Networks's "Classic Hits" network, with the exception of their local KFMJ morning and afternoon shows.

== Programming ==
=== Overview ===
KFMJ targets its programming to a core group of listeners: i.e., adults over the age of 35.

With its transmitter located atop High Mountain on Gravina Island (height above average terrain: 2,234 feet (681 m)), across the Tongass Narrows from Ketchikan, KFMJ's signal provides maximum coverage to a wide area, including Saxman and other suburbs of Ketchikan on Revillagigedo Island, Metlakatla and vicinity to Prince of Wales Island communities to the west and Prince Rupert and northwestern coastal British Columbia to the south.

As one of a very few Southeast Alaska (Alaska's "Panhandle") stations live streaming audio on the Internet, KFMJ serves a national and international audience on the Web, too.

=== Local ===
News and weather updates are broadcast throughout the day. KFMJ airs local news gathered by its news department and top-of-the-hour news from USA Radio Network and is also affiliated with the ABC Radio Network and Associated Press. Coast to Coast AM is aired after 9 pm local time.

Starting in 2004, KFMJ became the home for Kayhi Kings & Lady Kings sports broadcasts at the request of Ketchikan High School. KFMJ provides play-by-play coverage of Boys & Girls Basketball, Boys Baseball and Boys Football. The station additionally carries coverage of select Metlakatla games and Little League Baseball. Games are simulcast online and archived on the KFMJ website.

=== Network feeds ===
Throughout most of the day on weekdays, KFMJ's programming is a satellite feed of Citadel Media's "Classic Hits" network (formerly ABC Radio) with the exception of their live, local morning and afternoon drive shows and Coast To Coast AM overnights.

The weekend programming lineup is satellite fed all day on Saturdays and most of the day on Sundays with the exception of the "Sunday Special," a live, local segment hosted by Bob Kern. The "Sunday Special" features recordings of shows from "Radio's Golden Age" and "The Jean Shepherd Program."

== Awards ==
KFMJ has won numerous awards for its Commercial, Public Service, News and Comedy content from the Alaska Broadcasters Association, starting in 2002. The awards won by the station, by year, are as follows:

- 2002
  - Best Radio Commercial - Series - Division 2: "Narrows Inn - Thornlow's Bar"
- 2003
  - Best Radio Commercial - Series - Division 2: "WestCoast Cape Fox Lodge: Great Chefs"
  - Best Public Service Announcement - Single Entry - Division 2: "I've Got Dreams"
- 2004
  - Best Promotional Package - Division 2: "KFMJ Radio Fishing Derby"
  - Best Public Service Announcement - Single Entry - Division 2: "All-City Halloween Party"
  - Best Promotional Item - Division 2: "KFMJ Media Kit"
  - Best Comedy Feature - Division 2: "Gormley Goozley's Polka Music Challenge - Girl Scout Cookies"
- 2011
  - Goldie Award - Alaska's version of an "Emmy" award, recognizing excellence in radio/TV broadcasting.
