= WZBB =

- Stanleytown, Virginia; United States
- Broadcast area: Rocky Mount, Virginia; Martinsville, Virginia
- Frequency: 99.9 MHz
- Branding: "B 99-9"

Programming
- Format: Country
- Affiliations: ABC News Radio

Ownership
- Owner: Turner Media Group, Inc.

History
- First air date: March 1989; 37 years ago

Technical information
- Licensing authority: FCC
- Facility ID: 73340
- Class: C3
- Power: 3,600 Watts
- HAAT: 220 meters (720 ft)
- Transmitter coordinates: 36°54′50.0″N 79°57′7.0″W

Links
- Public license information: Public file; LMS
- Webcast: WZBB Webstream
- Website: WZBB Online

WZBB (99.9 FM) is a Country-formatted radio station licensed to Stanleytown, Virginia, serving the Rocky Mount/Martinsville area. WZBB is owned and operated by Turner Media Group, Inc. It is an Affiliate with the Motor Racing Network & the Performance Racing Network airing its NASCAR Cup Series races on weekends.

== History ==
The station first took the callsign WZBB on February 15, 1989, and officially launched a month later in March. For two and a half years, the station would carry an Adult Contemporary format, branded as "B-99.9". At midnight on December 31, 1991, WZBB switched to Country, keeping the "B-99.9" branding, and using the slogan "Today's Hot Country". In October 2006, the branding was changed to "Super Country 99.9; The Greatest Hits of All Time". On March 1, 2019, the station reverted to its original branding, "B-99.9; Southern Virginia's Country Station".
