= CFNM-FM =

First Nations radio station in Quebec, Canada

Coordinates: 51°41′35″N 76°11′11″W

- Nemaska, Quebec, Canada; Canada
- Frequency: 99.9 MHz

Programming
- Format: community radio

Ownership
- Owner: Cree Nation of Nemaska

Technical information
- Class: A
- ERP: horizontal polarization only: 750 watts
- HAAT: 36.9 meters (121 ft)

Links
- Website: nemaska.com

CFNM-FM is a community radio station that broadcasts at 99.9 FM in Nemaska, Quebec, Canada.

The station is owned and administrated by the Cree Nation of Nemaska.
