= KKTC =

Radio station in Angel Fire–Taos, New Mexico

- Angel Fire, New Mexico; United States
- Frequency: 99.9 MHz
- Branding: 99.9 Angel Fire

Programming
- Format: Classic Country

Ownership
- Owner: Lorene Cino Gonzalez and Christopher Munoz; (L.M.N.O.C. Broadcasting LLC)

Technical information
- Licensing authority: FCC
- Facility ID: 43767
- Class: C2
- ERP: 1,750 watts
- HAAT: 646 meters (2,119 ft)
- Transmitter coordinates: 36°33′30″N 105°11′38″W

Links
- Public license information: Public file; LMS
- Website: www.lmnocbroadcasting.com

KKTC (99.9 MHz) is a commercial FM radio station licensed to Angel Fire, New Mexico. It serves Northern New Mexico including Taos. It has a classic country radio format. KKTC is owned by L.M.N.O.C. Broadcasting LLC, and retransmits via a booster station (KKTC-FM1) in Taos itself.
