= CKIQ-FM =

Radio station in Iqaluit, Nunavut, Canada

- Iqaluit, Nunavut; Canada
- Broadcast area: Iqaluit and Apex, Nunavut
- Frequency: 99.9 MHz
- Branding: Raven Rock

Programming
- Format: Classic rock

Ownership
- Owner: Northern Lights Entertainment, Inc.
- Sister stations: CKGC-FM

History
- First air date: December 13, 2002
- Call sign meaning: Iqaluit

Technical information
- Licensing authority: CRTC
- Facility ID: 7161
- Class: A
- Power: 342 watts
- HAAT: −40 metres (−130 ft)
- Transmitter coordinates: 63°44′57.12″N 68°31′18.84″W

Links
- Webcast: CKIQ-FM Webstream
- Website: CKIQ-FM Online

CKIQ-FM is a classic rock formatted broadcast radio station licensed to Iqaluit, Nunavut, Canada, and serving Iqaluit and Apex in Nunavut. It is owned and operated by Northern Lights Entertainment, Inc.

== History ==
On December 13, 2002, the Canadian Radio-television and Telecommunications Commission (CRTC) approved an application by Nunavut Natautinga Ltd. to operate a predominantly English-language FM radio programming undertaking at Iqaluit, Nunavut on the frequency 99.9 MHz (channel 260A) with an effective radiated power of 537 watts.

On March 2, 2009, the CRTC approved an application by Northern Lights Entertainment Inc. to acquire the assets of CKIQ-FM Iqaluit from Nunavut Nalautinga Ltd. Also in 2009, Northern Lights Entertainment Inc. received CRTC approval to decrease CKIQ-FM's maximum effective radiated power from 1,000 to 415 watts and average ERP would decrease from 537 to 415 watts. Antenna height would change from 41 metres to minus 39.8 metres. The antenna pattern would change from directional to non- directional.

== Rebroadcasters ==
The station also has a rebroadcaster, CKIQ-FM-2 at 99.9 FM, in Rankin Inlet.
