= WUCP-LP =

- Farragut, Tennessee; United States
- Frequency: 99.9 MHz
- Branding: "Radio 99.9 FM"

Programming
- Format: Religious

Ownership
- Owner: Union Cumberland Presbyterian Church

History
- Former frequencies: 106.1 MHz (2003–2013)
- Call sign meaning: W "U"nion "C"umberland "P"resbyterian Church

Technical information
- Licensing authority: FCC
- Facility ID: 133919
- Class: L1
- ERP: 100 watts
- HAAT: 30 meters
- Transmitter coordinates: 35°52′28.00″N 84°12′0.00″W

Links
- Public license information: LMS
- Website: wucplp.com

WUCP-LP (99.9 FM, "Radio 99.9 FM") is a low-powered radio station broadcasting a Religious format. The station is licensed to the suburb of Farragut, Tennessee. WUCP-LP first began broadcasting in 2003 under its current call sign. The station is currently owned by Union Cumberland Presbyterian Church.

On February 19, 2009, WUCP-LP changed frequencies moving from 106.1 FM to 99.9 FM to make way for a high-power commercial station in Oliver Springs, Tennessee (WJZO). The station was issued a license to cover at 99.9 FM on May 31, 2013.
