= XHEMZ-FM =

Radio station in Emiliano Zapata, Tabasco

Emiliano Zapata, Tabasco; Mexico
- Broadcast area: Tabasco
- Frequency: 99.9 MHz
- Branding: Oye 99.9

Programming
- Format: Pop

Ownership
- Owner: Grupo Cantón; (Nora María Cantón Martínez de Escobar)

History
- First air date: August 4, 1992 (concession)
- Call sign meaning: EMiliano Zapata

Technical information
- ERP: 80 kW

Links
- Website: radiozapata.wixsite.com/oye999fm

XHEMZ-FM is a radio station in Emiliano Zapata Municipality, Tabasco. It is owned by Grupo Cantón and carries a pop format known as Oye.

== History ==
XHEMZ received its concession on August 4, 1992. It was owned by Celia María Rovirosa González and originally broadcast on 100.1 MHz. In 2007, the station was sold to José Gerardo Gaudiano Peralta, noteworthy for his operation of other stations in Tabasco such as XEHGR-AM Villahermosa. The current concessionaire took possession of the station on April 11, 2012.
