= KTCS-FM =

- Fort Smith, Arkansas; United States
- Broadcast area: Fort Smith, Arkansas
- Frequency: 99.9 MHz
- Branding: 99.9 KTCS

Programming
- Format: Country

Ownership
- Owner: Big Chief Broadcasting Company

Technical information
- Licensing authority: FCC
- Facility ID: 5220
- Class: C
- ERP: 100,000 Watts
- HAAT: 585.0 meters
- Transmitter coordinates: 35°4′20″N 94°40′50″W

Links
- Public license information: Public file; LMS
- Webcast: Social Streaming Player
- Website: http://www.ktcs.com

KTCS-FM (99.9 FM) is a radio station broadcasting a country music format. Licensed to Fort Smith, Arkansas, United States, it serves the Ft. Smith area. The station is currently owned by Big Chief Broadcasting Company. The station runs The TJ show Monday though Friday 6 am till 10 am.
