= WPKA-LP =

Radio station in Apopka, Florida

- Apopka, Florida; United States
- Frequency: 99.9 MHz
- Branding: Lesog Radio

Programming
- Format: Urban gospel

Ownership
- Owner: VJIL Inc.

Technical information
- Licensing authority: FCC
- Facility ID: 194816
- Class: L1
- ERP: 67 watts
- HAAT: 38 metres (125 ft)
- Transmitter coordinates: 28°40′48.5″N 81°30′25.8″W

Links
- Public license information: LMS
- Webcast: Listen Live
- Website: Official Website

WPKA-LP (99.9 FM) is a radio station licensed to serve the community of Apopka, Florida. The station is owned by VJIL Inc. It airs an Urban gospel format.

The station was assigned the callsign WPKA-LP by the Federal Communications Commission on March 7, 2014.
