= KUAA-LP =

- Salt Lake City, Utah; United States
- Frequency: 99.9 MHz
- Branding: KUAA

Programming
- Format: Community radio

Ownership
- Owner: Utah Arts Alliance

History
- Call sign meaning: Utah Arts Alliance

Technical information
- Licensing authority: FCC
- Facility ID: 195081
- Class: LP1
- ERP: 100 watts
- HAAT: −128 meters (−420 ft)
- Transmitter coordinates: 40°46′00.8″N 111°54′38.5″W

Links
- Public license information: LMS
- Webcast: Listen live
- Website: www.kuaafm.org

KUAA-LP (99.9 FM, "KUAA") is a radio station licensed to serve the community of Salt Lake City, Utah. The station is owned by Utah Arts Alliance and airs a community radio format.

The station was assigned the KUAA-LP call letters by the Federal Communications Commission on July 9, 2015.
