= KVBN-LP =

- Enid, Oklahoma; United States
- Broadcast area: Enid, Oklahoma
- Frequency: 99.9 MHz
- Branding: KVBN 99.9

Programming
- Format: Religious Teaching

Ownership
- Owner: Victory Bible Church, Inc.

History
- First air date: 2015

Technical information
- Licensing authority: FCC
- Facility ID: 194113
- Class: LP1
- ERP: 100 watts
- HAAT: 26.54 meters (87.1 ft)
- Transmitter coordinates: 36°24′44″N 97°53′20″W

Links
- Public license information: LMS
- Website: https://sites.google.com/site/vbcenid/radio-kvbn-99-9

KVBN-LP (99.9 FM) is a low-power FM radio station licensed to Enid, Oklahoma, United States. The station is currently owned by Victory Bible Church, Inc.

== History ==
The station was assigned the call sign KVBN-LP on March 13, 2014.
