= WWJB =

Radio station in Brooksville, Florida

- Brooksville, Florida; United States
- Broadcast area: Hernando County, Florida
- Frequency: 1450 kHz
- Branding: 103.9 The Boot

Programming
- Format: Country
- Affiliations: Local Radio Networks

Ownership
- Owner: Hernando Broadcasting Company, Inc.
- Sister stations: WXJB

History
- First air date: October 11, 1958
- Call sign meaning: W. "Woody" Johnson Brooksville (original owner + location)

Technical information
- Licensing authority: FCC
- Facility ID: 27094
- Class: C
- Power: 1,000 watts
- Transmitter coordinates: 28°33′20″N 82°22′36″W
- Translators: 92.3 W222CI (Brooksville); 103.9 W280DK (Spring Hill)

Links
- Public license information: Public file; LMS
- Website: www.wwjb.com

WWJB (1450 AM, "103.9 The Boot") is an American radio station licensed to serve the community of Brooksville, Florida. The station, established in 1958 as WKTS, is currently owned and operated by Hernando Broadcasting Company, Inc. WWJB is also repeated on FM translators W222CI 92.3 FM Brooksville, Florida and W280DK 103.9 FM Spring Hill, Florida.

== Programming ==
Until October 16, 2017, WWJB broadcast a full service news/talk radio format to the greater Hernando County, Florida, area. As of June 1, 2012, weekday programming on the station included syndicated talk shows hosted by Jim Bohannon, Phil Hendrie, Neal Boortz, Sean Hannity, Clark Howard, and Michael Savage. Local weekday programming included The Nature Coast Morning News, The Haywire Talk Show with Bob Haa, The Bob Penrod Show. Weekend programming included syndicated shows hosted by Larry Kudlow, Jerry Doyle, and Kim Komando. Local weekend programming included a tradio program called Trading Post, a three-hour block of classic country music on Saturday, plus religious talk shows and local church services on Sunday morning.

On October 16, 2017, WWJB changed their format from news/talk to country, branded as "103.9 The Boot". The Current weekday line up as of May 1, 2024 includes hosts: Renee Dubay, Craig "Catfish" Hunter, Shery Farmer, DJ Trea, Steve Brewer, John Glenn and Steel Horse Radio every Friday since 2015 with father and son duo DJ Dave Martini and DJ Mike Martini who joined the show in 2024. Weekend programing includes: nationally syndicated Rise Up with John Ritter on Sunday.

== Station alumni ==
One of the station's notable alumni included George Lowe, who later became well known for his role as Space Ghost in Space Ghost Coast to Coast on Adult Swim. While living in Brooksville in the early-1970s, he began learning radio skills at WWJB. Mitch English from national television show The Daily Buzz started his broadcast career at the station in the early 1990s.
