= Rede Aleluia =

Brazilian radio network of the Universal Church of the Kingdom of God

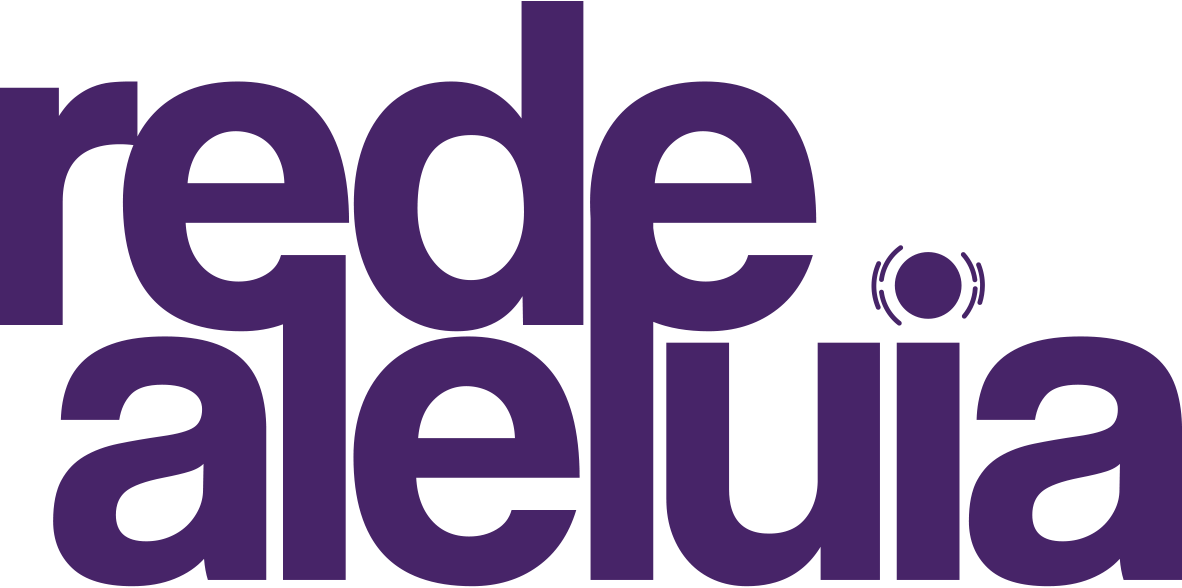

The Rede Aleluia (Hallelujah Network) is 63 affiliated Brazilian radio stations network owned/rented by the UCKG (Universal Church of the Kingdom of God) in 22 of the 27 states, that cover 75% of the Brazilian territory mostly in southeastern region, and also there is an internet radio version on its site. The radio broadcasts the programming of TV Universal since 2011.

== History ==
Rede Aleluia was created in 1995 with 19 affiliated radio stations retransmitting the central signal via satellite from the radio 105 FM in Rio de Janeiro. Since the second half of 2002 the central transmission has been from the radio 99.3 FM in São Paulo.

== Programming ==
The basic Rede Aleluia programming is composed of gospel national and international songs and instrumental melodies specially from Line Records and New Music record label, news and guidelines every two hours and local programming of the UCKG.

== Stations ==
This is a list of the radio stations by cities, generally the radio stations also have signal in neighbor cities.

=== Central-west ===
- Distrito Federal
  - Brasília - 99.3 FM
- Goiás
  - Anápolis - 100 FM
- Mato Grosso
  - Cuiabá 100.9 FM
- Mato Grosso do Sul
  - Campo Grande - 102.7 FM

=== North ===
- Amazonas
  - Manaus - 95.1 fM
- Pará
  - Belém - 98 FM
- Rondônia
  - Porto Velho - 96.9 FM

=== Northeast ===
- Bahia
  - Ilhéus - 97.9 FM
  - Itabuna - 96.9 FM
  - Salvador - 96 FM
- Ceará
  - Fortaleza - 99.9 FM
- Maranhão
  - São Luís - 105.5 FM
- Paraíba
  - João Pessoa - 99.7 FM

Pernambuco

  - Garanhuns - 550 AM
  - Recife - 91.9 FM
- Piauí
  - Teresina - 94.1 FM
- Rio Grande do Norte
  - Natal - 102.9 FM
- Sergipe
  - Aracaju - 98.1 FM

=== South ===
- Paraná
  - Curitiba - 88.5 FM
  - Londrina - 105.5 FM

Rio Grande do Sul

  - Caxias do Sul - 93.5 FM
  - Pelotas - 93.3 FM
  - Porto Alegre - 100.5 FM
- Santa Catarina
  - Florianópolis - 99.3 FM

=== Southeast ===
- Espírito Santo
  - Vitória - 90.1 FM
- Minas Gerais
  - Belo Horizonte - 90.7 FM
  - Juiz de Fora - 93.5 FM
  - Poços de Caldas - 96.7 FM
  - Uberaba - 103.7 FM
  - Uberlândia - 99.9 FM
- Rio de Janeiro
  - Angra dos Reis - 101 FM
  - Cabo Frio - 102 FM
  - Campos dos Goytacazes - 89 FM
  - Macaé - 103 FM
  - Rio de Janeiro - 105 FM
  - Volta Redonda - 101.5 FM
- São Paulo
  - Bauru - 103.7 FM
  - Campinas - 100.3 FM
  - Catanduva - 94.9 FM
  - Franca - 98.3 FM
  - Guarujá/Santos - 94.3 FM
  - Limeira - 95.1 FM
  - Lins - 103.1 FM
  - Marília - 92.9 FM
  - Registro - 750 AM
  - Ribeirão Preto - 103.5 FM
  - São Carlos - 96.9 FM
  - São José do Rio Preto - 97.1 FM
  - São José dos Campos - 99.7 FM
  - Sorocaba - 99.7 FM
  - Taubaté - 106.5 FM
  - Vinhedo/Jundiaí - 94.1 FM
  - Votuporanga - 99 FM

== See also ==
- Universal Church of the Kingdom of God
- Line Records
