= KDUB-LP =

- Watsonville, California; United States
- Frequency: 99.9 MHz

Programming
- Format: Regional Mexican

Ownership
- Owner: Power Broadcasting

History
- First air date: December 27, 2014

Technical information
- Licensing authority: FCC
- Facility ID: 195674
- Class: L1
- ERP: 100 watts
- HAAT: −94 meters (−308 ft)
- Transmitter coordinates: 36°56′57.80″N 121°44′27.00″W

Links
- Public license information: LMS

KDUB-LP (99.9 FM) is a low power radio station licensed to Watsonville, California, United States. The station features a Regional Mexican format.

== History ==
KDUB-LP began broadcasting on December 27, 2014.
