= WFEL-LP =

- Antioch, Illinois; United States
- Frequency: 99.9 MHz
- Branding: "Faith 99"

Programming
- Format: Full service

Ownership
- Owner: Faith Evangelical Lutheran Church

History
- First air date: 2003
- Call sign meaning: "Faith Evangelical Lutheran"

Technical information
- Licensing authority: FCC
- Facility ID: 126337
- Class: L1
- ERP: 49 watts
- HAAT: 42.6 meters
- Transmitter coordinates: 42°29′25.0″N 88°06′25.0″W

Links
- Public license information: LMS
- Website: wfel.faithantioch.org

WFEL-LP is a full-service radio station licensed to and serving Antioch, Illinois. It is owned and operated by Faith Evangelical Lutheran Church.
