= WQBR (FM) =

Radio station in Avis, Pennsylvania

- Avis, Pennsylvania; United States
- Broadcast area: Williamsport/Lock Haven/State College
- Frequency: 99.9 MHz
- Branding: The Bear Country 99.9 FM

Programming
- Format: Country/Americana music
- Affiliations: AP Radio, Westwood One

Ownership
- Owner: Maximum Impact Communications, Inc.

History
- Former call signs: WHUM (1990–1993); WDKK (1993–1993)

Technical information
- Licensing authority: FCC
- Facility ID: 40766
- Class: A
- ERP: 570 watts
- HAAT: 321.0 meters
- Transmitter coordinates: 41°13′45.00″N 77°22′2.00″W

Links
- Public license information: Public file; LMS
- Webcast: Yes
- Website: bear999.com

WQBR (99.9 FM) is a radio station broadcasting a Country/Americana music format. Licensed to Avis, Pennsylvania, United States, the station serves the Williamsport/Lock Haven/State College area, airing over substantial areas of Clinton, Lycoming and Centre Counties in Central Pennsylvania. The area between Williamsport and State College is the defining line between the influence of Pittsburgh to the west, and Philadelphia to the east; no station had ever bridged those markets.

Before the State College Arbitron ratings no longer were unavailable, the Bear was the only station that showed in both rating books.

The station is owned by Maximum Impact Communications, Inc. and features news programming from AP Radio, some satellite music programming from the New Hit Country channel from Westwood One, and over 60 hours a week of local Americana music programming. In addition, the stations broadcast local Jersey Shore High School football and a complete schedule of sports from nearby Lock Haven University.

Located in McElhattan for twenty-four years, the station was moved by its owners into their city of license. Purchasing an old church building at 103 West Highland Street in Avis that had been abandoned in 2011, the renovated the structure, creating studios for WQBR-FM and their companion magazines, Good News and Pawsitively Pets. Known as the Church of Country and Americana, it opened for business in August, 2017, mere months before the 25th anniversary of their sign-on on November 1, 1993.

Previous WQBR logo

The new studios include space for live performances and executive offices for employees, the social media center for the corporation (including the Bear Country Podcast Network) and our 501(c)(3) non-profit, the Bear Country Christmas Wish.

== History ==
The station went on the air as WHUM on October 19, 1990. On January 6, 1993, the station changed its call sign to WDKK. On October 26, 1993, it changed to the current WQBR.
