= Iqaluit =

Capital city of Nunavut, Canada

Iqaluit ᐃᖃᓗᐃᑦ (Inuktitut syllabics)
- City and territorial capital
- City of Iqaluit
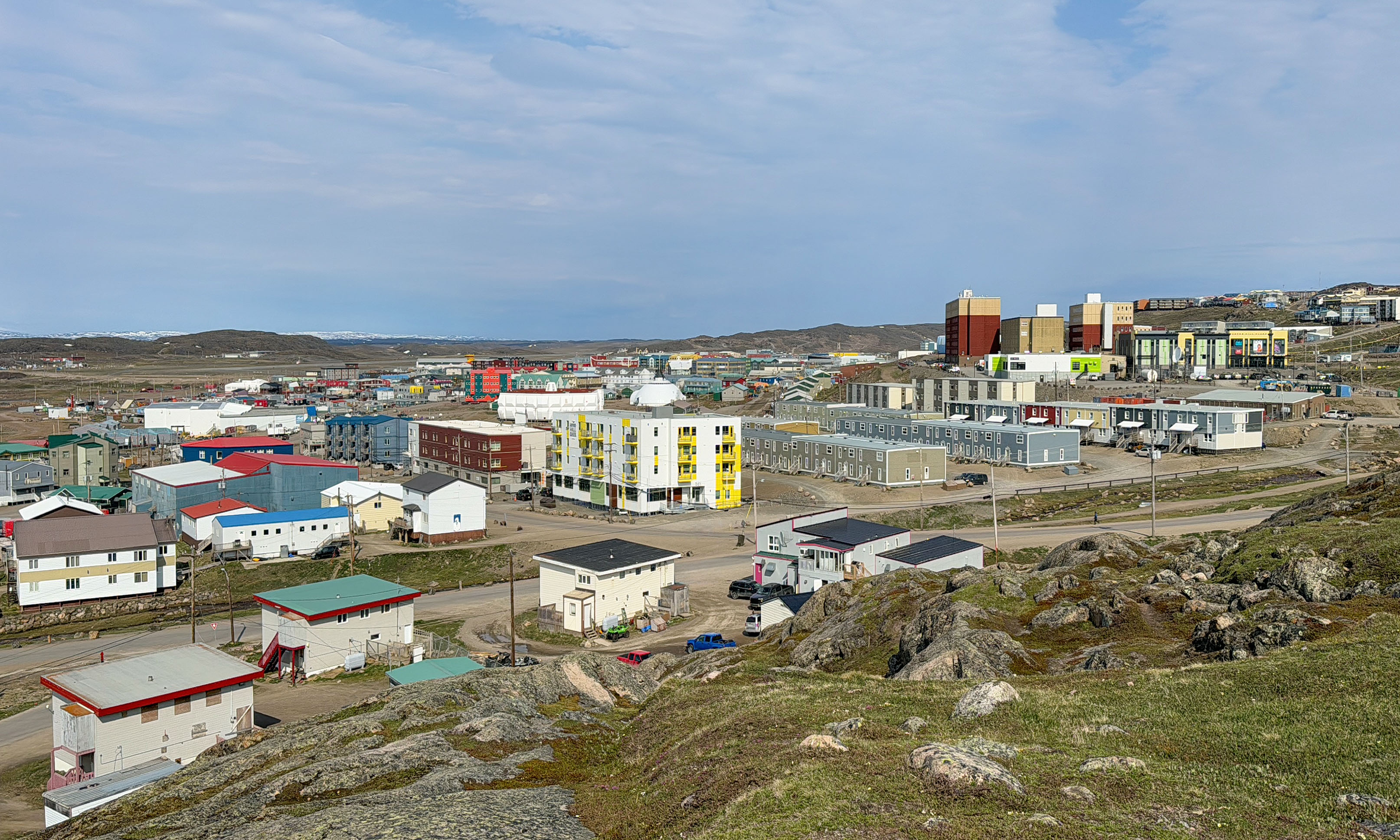
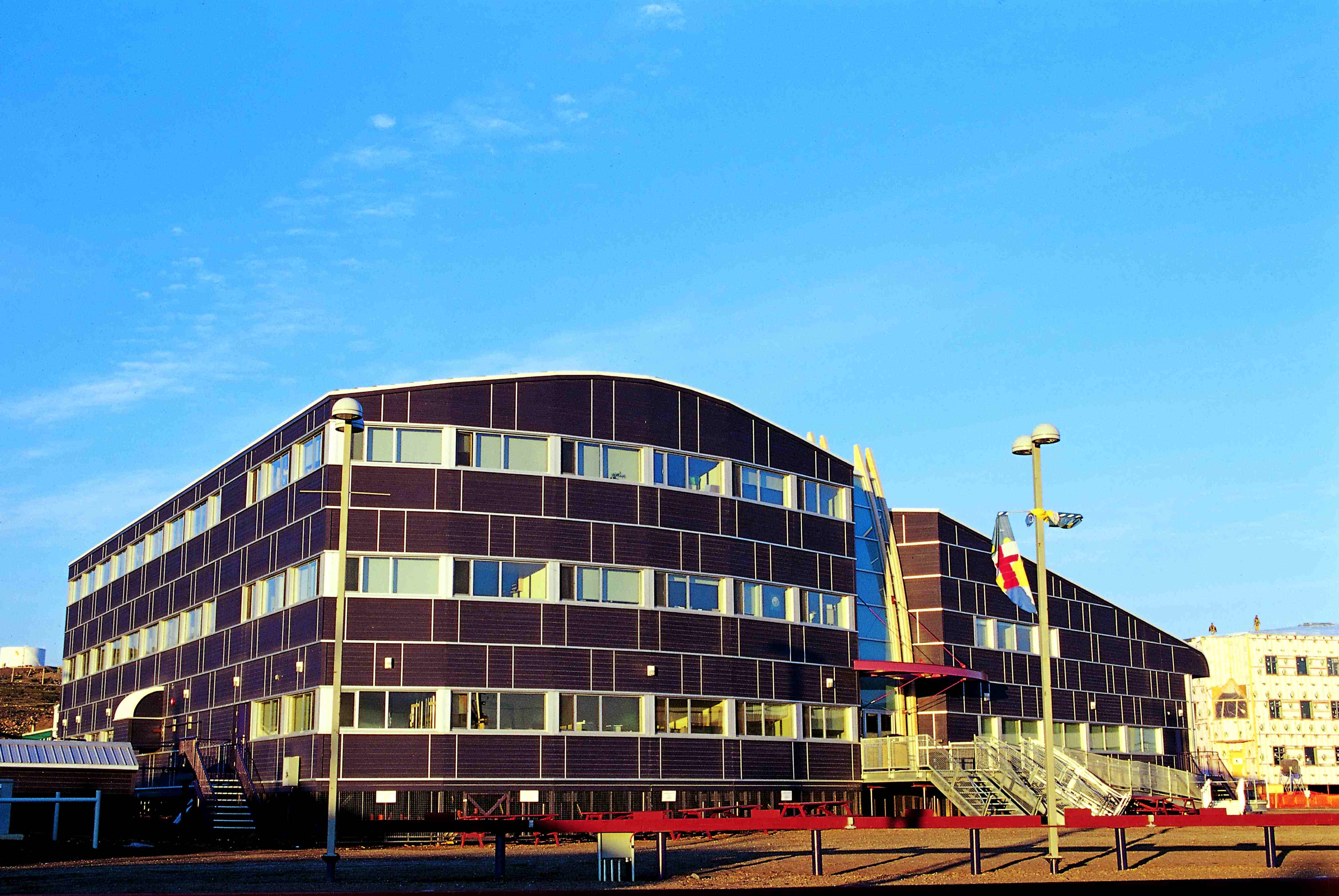
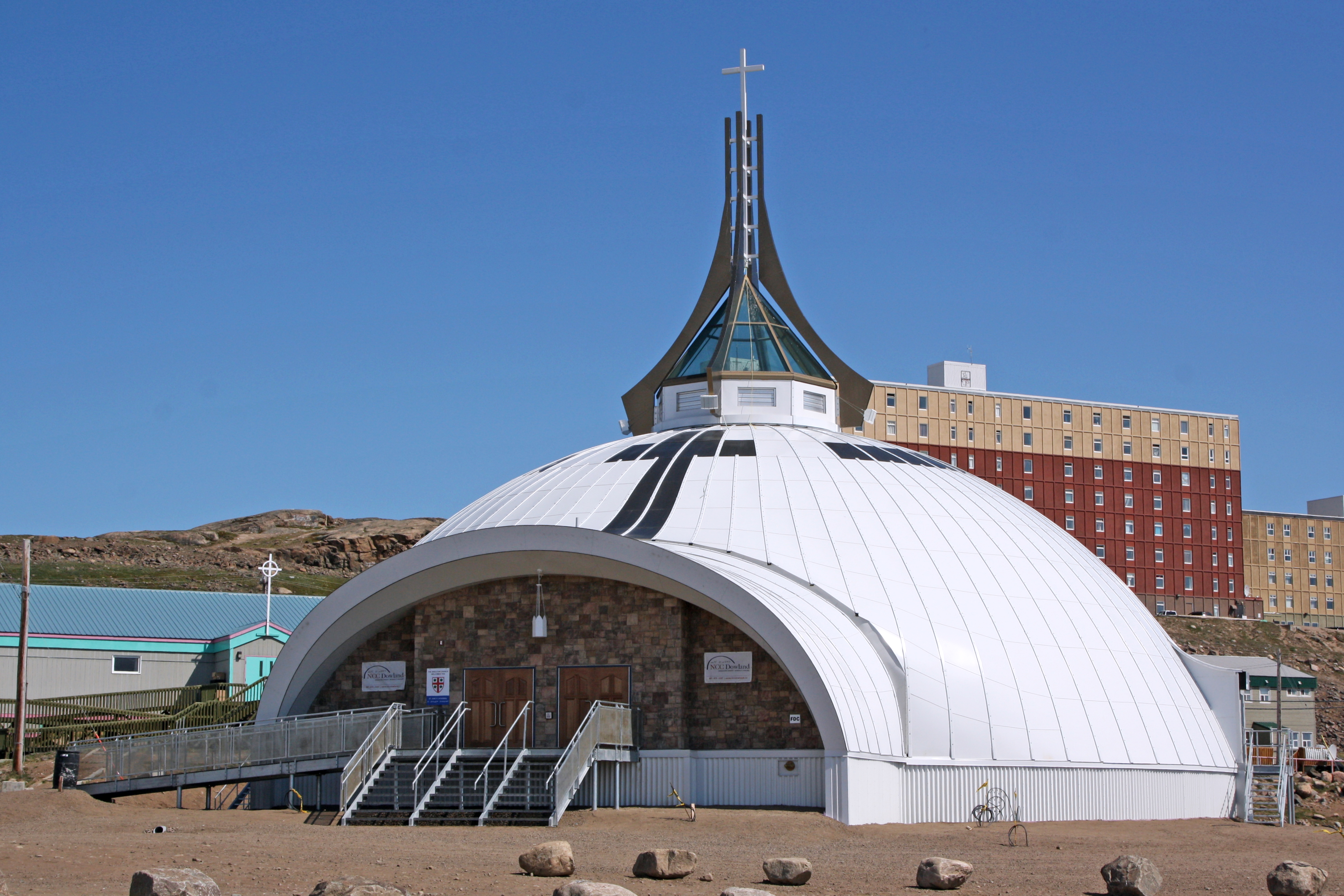
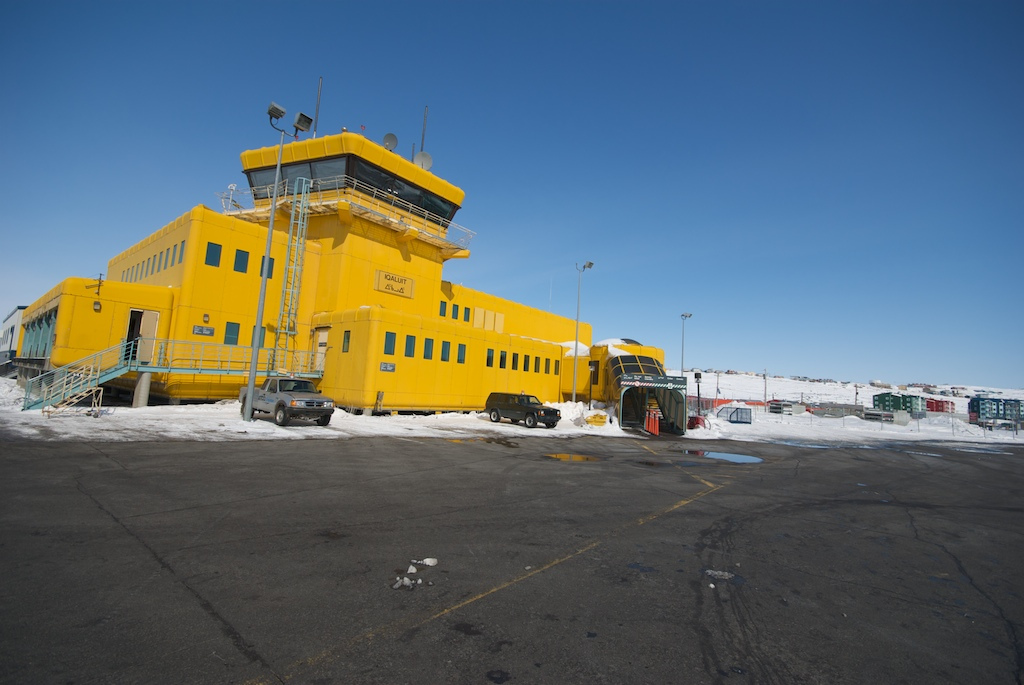
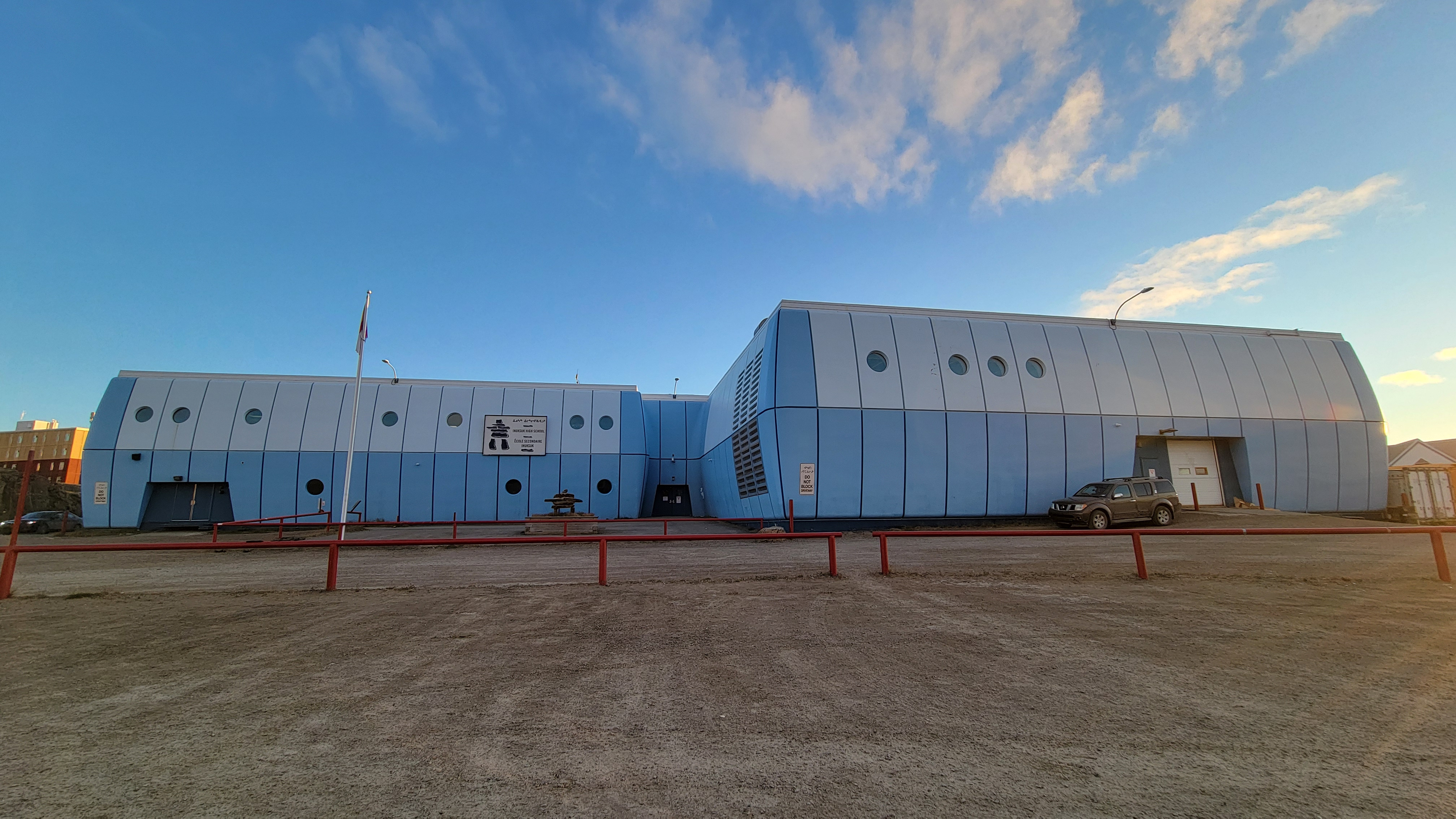
- Downtown Iqaluit Nunavut Legislative Building St. Jude's Cathedral Iqaluit Airport Inuksuk High School

- Flag Seal

- Location of Iqaluit Iqaluit (Canada)
- Coordinates: 63°44′58″N 68°31′18″W
- Country: Canada
- Territory: Nunavut
- Region: Qikiqtaaluk
- Electoral districts: Iqaluit-Manirajak; Iqaluit-Niaqunnguu; Iqaluit-Sinaa; Iqaluit-Tasiluk
- Settled: 1942
- Village status: 1974
- Town status: 1980
- City status: 19 April 2001
- Founder: Nakasuk

Government
  - Type: Iqaluit City Council
  - Mayor: Solomon Awa
  - MLAs: Gwen Healey Akearok; David Akeeagok; Janet Brewster; George Hickes
  - MP: Lori Idlout

Area (2021)
  - Total: 51.58 km^{2} (19.92 sq mi)
  - Population Centre: 10.48 km^{2} (4.05 sq mi)
- Elevation: 34 m (110 ft)

Population (2021)
  - Total: 7,429
  - Density: 144/km^{2} (370/sq mi)
  - Population Centre: 6,991
  - Population Centre density: 667/km^{2} (1,730/sq mi)
- Demonym: Iqalummiut
- Time zone: UTC−05:00 (EST)
  - Summer (DST): UTC−04:00 (EDT)
- Postal code: X0A 0A1, X0A 0H0, X0A 1H0, X0A 2H0, X0A 3H0
- Area code: 867
- Telephone exchanges: 222 (mobile), 975, 979
- NTS Map: 25N10 Hill Island
- GNBC Code: OATRP
- Website: iqaluit.ca

Iqaluit (Note: /ɪˈkæluɪt/, /iˈkæluət/ ih-KAL-oo-it, ee-KAL-oo-ət; Inuktitut syllabics: ᐃᖃᓗᐃᑦ [iqaluit], and according to the City of Iqaluit translates to "place of many fish"; French: [ikalu.it]) is the capital of the Canadian territory of Nunavut. Located on Baffin Island, it is the territory's largest community and only city, and the northernmost city in Canada. It was known as Frobisher Bay from 1942 to 1987, after the large bay on the coast on which the city is situated. Its traditional Inuktitut name was restored in 1987.

In 1999, Iqaluit was designated the capital of Nunavut after the division of the Northwest Territories into two separate territories. Before this event, Iqaluit was a small city and not well known outside the Canadian Arctic or Canada, with population and economic growth highly limited. This is due to Iqaluit's isolation and heavy dependence on expensive imported supplies, as the city, like the rest of Nunavut, has no road or rail connections to the rest of Canada, and has ship connections for only part of the year. Iqaluit has a polar climate, influenced by the cold deep waters of the Labrador Current just off Baffin Island, which makes the city cold, although it is well south of the Arctic Circle.

As of the 2021 Canadian census, the population was 7,429 (population centre: 6,991), a decrease of 4.0 per cent from the 2016 census. Iqaluit has the lowest population of any capital city in Canada. Inhabitants of Iqaluit are called Iqalummiut (singular: Iqalummiuq).

== History ==
Iqaluit has been a traditional fishing location used by Inuit and their predecessors, the Paleo-Eskimo (Dorset culture) and Thule, for thousands of years. The name, Iqaluit, comes from Inuktitut Iqaluit (ᐃᖃᓗᐃᑦ), which means 'place of many fish'.

World War II caused an influx of non-Inuit to the area when in 1942, the United States built Frobisher Bay Air Base there, on a long-term lease from the Government of Canada, in order to provide a stop-over and refuelling site for the short-range aircraft being ferried to Europe to support the war effort. Iqaluit's first permanent resident was Nakasuk, an Inuk guide who helped United States Army Air Forces planners to choose a site with a large flat area suitable for a landing strip. The wartime airstrip was known as Crystal Two and was part of the Crimson Route. It operates today as Iqaluit Airport.

The US and Canadian authorities named it Frobisher Bay, after the name of the body of water it borders.

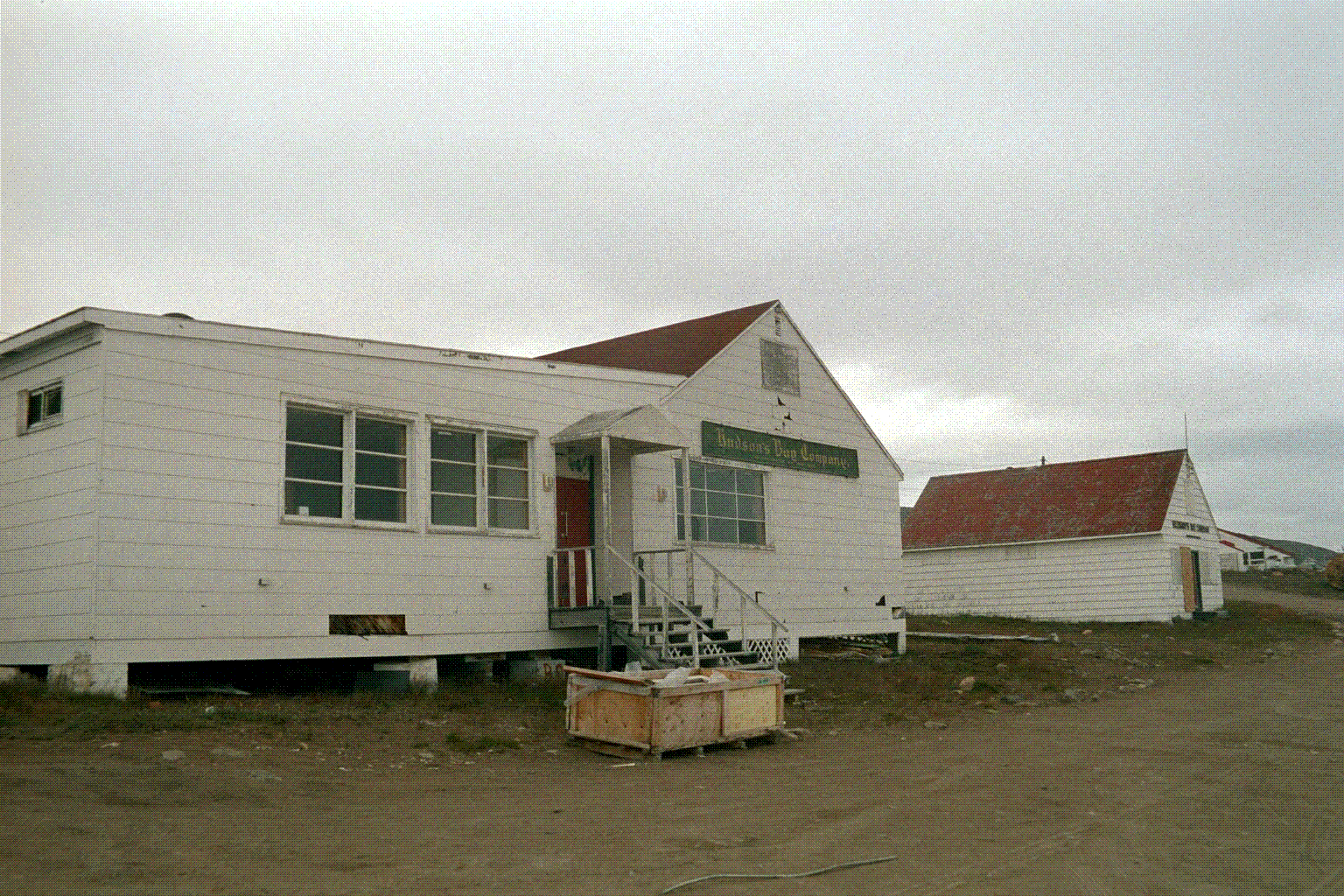
The Hudson's Bay Company moved its south Baffin operations to Apex in 1949 (pictured in 2005) to take advantage of the nearby airfield.

In 1949, after the war, the Hudson's Bay Company moved its south Baffin operations to the neighbouring valley of Niaqunngut, officially called Apex, in order to use the airfield. In the mid-1950s, the population of Frobisher Bay increased rapidly during the construction of the Distant Early Warning Line (DEW line), a system of defensive radar stations—see NORAD (North American Aerospace Defense Command).

Hundreds of mostly non-Inuit construction workers, military personnel, and administrative staff moved into the community, and several hundred Inuit followed, to take advantage of the access to jobs and medical care provided by the base operations. By 1957, 489 of the town's 1,200 residents were reported to be Inuit. After 1959, the Canadian government established permanent services at Frobisher Bay, including full-time doctors, a school, and social services. The Inuit population grew rapidly in response, as the government encouraged Inuit to settle permanently in communities supported by government services.

Naval Radio Station (NRS) Frobisher Bay (HMCS Frobisher Bay), callsign CFI, was established in July 1954 as a result of the closure of NRS Chimo, Quebec. Station CFI was part of the Supplementary Radio network. Because of its remoteness and size, it was very expensive to operate. Renamed CFS Frobisher Bay in 1966, advancing technology eventually forced the closure of CFI later that year.

The American military left Iqaluit in 1963, as the development of intercontinental ballistic missiles (ICBM) diminished the strategic value of the DEW line and Arctic airbases. Canada continued to operate an administrative and logistical centre for much of the eastern Arctic at Frobisher Bay. In 1964, the first local elections were held for a community council, and in 1979 for the first mayor. The founding of the Gordon Robertson Educational Centre, now Inuksuk High School, in the 1971 at Iqaluit confirmed the government's commitment to the community as an administrative centre. At the time of its founding, this was the sole high school operating in what constituted more than one-seventh of Canadian territory.

On 1 January 1987, the name of the municipality was changed from "Frobisher Bay" to "Iqaluit". This aligned official usage with the name that the Inuit population had always used, although many documents were made that referred to Iqaluit as Frobisher Bay for several years after 1987. In the non-binding 1995 Nunavut capital plebiscite, held on 11 December, the residents of what would become the new territory selected Iqaluit (over Rankin Inlet) to serve as the future capital. On 19 April 2001, it became an official city.

Canada designated Iqaluit as the host city for the 2010 meeting of the G7 (Group of Seven) finance ministers. It was held on 5–6 February. The requirements for the international meeting strained the northern communications technology infrastructure and required supplemental investment.

=== Timeline ===
- 1576 – Englishman Martin Frobisher sails into Frobisher Bay believing he has found the westward route to China. He held the first Anglican church service in North America here.
- 1861 – Charles Francis Hall, an American, camps at the Sylvia Grinnell River and explores the waters of Koojesse Inlet, which he names after his Inuk guide.
- 1942 – The United States Army Air Forces selects this area as the site of a major air base to support war efforts in the United Kingdom and Europe.
- 1949 – The Hudson's Bay Company (HBC) moves its trading post from Ward Inlet to nearby Apex.
- 1955 – Frobisher Bay becomes the centre for the United States/Canada DEW Line construction operations. Many Inuit continue to settle here for local services.
- 1958 – Telephone exchange service established by Bell Canada.
- 1963 – United States military moves out, resulting in some population loss.
- 1964 – First community council formed. The population of Frobisher Bay is 900.
- 1970 – Frobisher Bay officially recognized as a settlement.
- 1974 – Settlement of Frobisher Bay gains village status.
- 1976 – Inuit present a proposal for a separate Nunavut Territory to the Federal government.
- 1979 – The first mayor elected, Bryan Pearson.
- 1980 – Frobisher Bay designated as a town.
- 1982 – Government of Canada agrees in principle to the creation of Nunavut.
- 1987 – Frobisher Bay is renamed as Iqaluit, its original Inuktitut name meaning "place of (many) fish".
- 1993 – The Nunavut Land Claims Agreement is signed in Iqaluit.
- 1995 – Nunavut residents select Iqaluit as the capital of the new territory
- 1 April 1999 – The territory of Nunavut is established.
- 19 April 2001 – Iqaluit is chartered as a city.
- 2002 – Iqaluit, along with Nuuk, Greenland, co-host the first jointly hosted Arctic Winter Games; the Arctic Winter Games Arena was constructed in Iqaluit for the event.
- 5 February 2010 – Canada designates Iqaluit to host the finance meeting as part of the 2010 G7 summit.
- 29 July 2022 – Pope Francis visits Iqaluit to meet with a group of former residential school alumni on his penitential apostolic visit to Canada. He is the first Pope to visit Nunavut.

== Geography ==
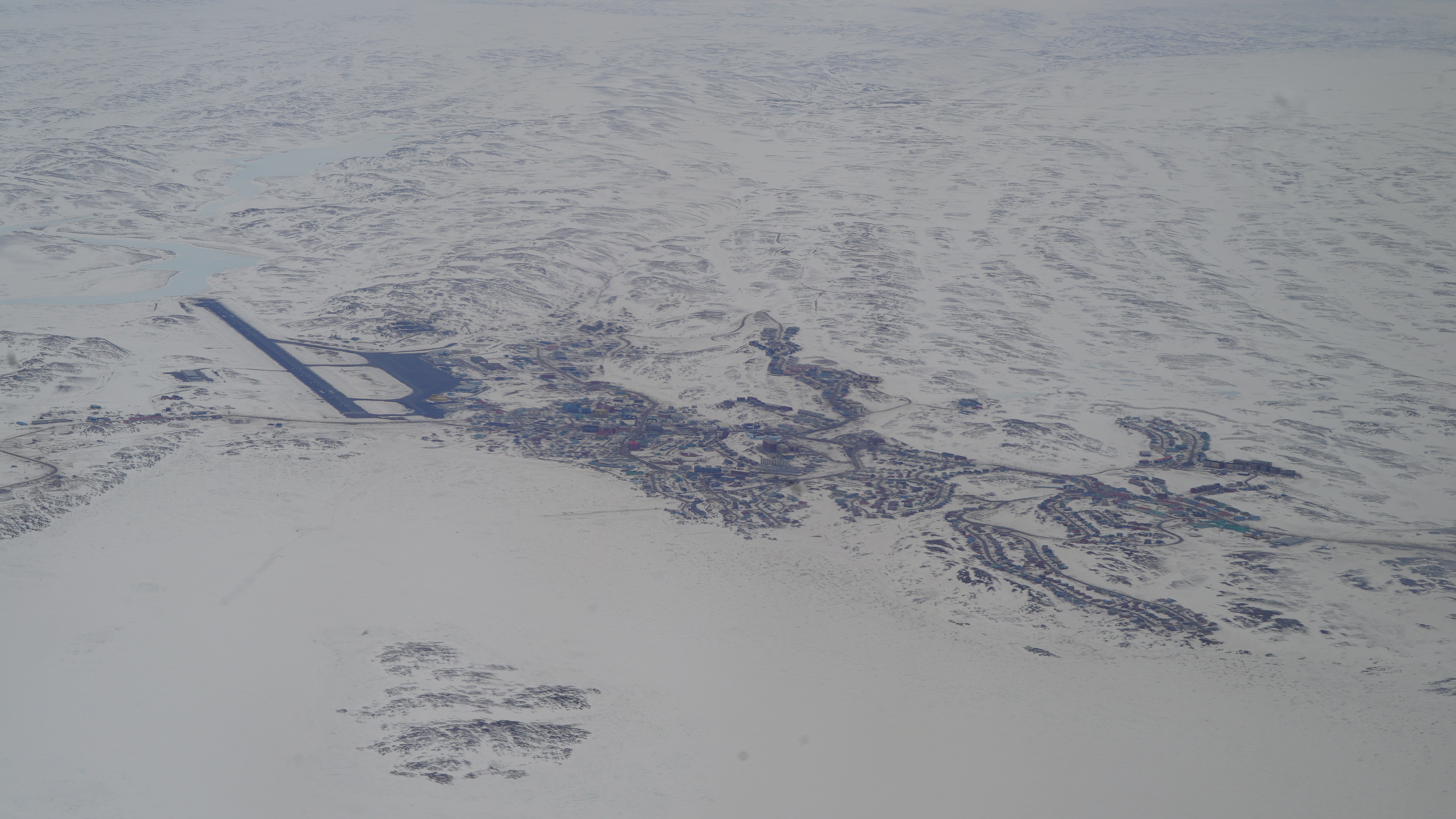
Iqaluit is situated on the Everett Mountains.

Iqaluit is the northernmost city in Canada, at 63 degrees north of the Equator. Iqaluit is located in the Everett Mountains, which rise from Koojesse Inlet, an inlet of Frobisher Bay, on the southeast part of Baffin Island. It is well to the east of Nunavut's mainland, and northeast of Hudson Bay.

=== Climate ===
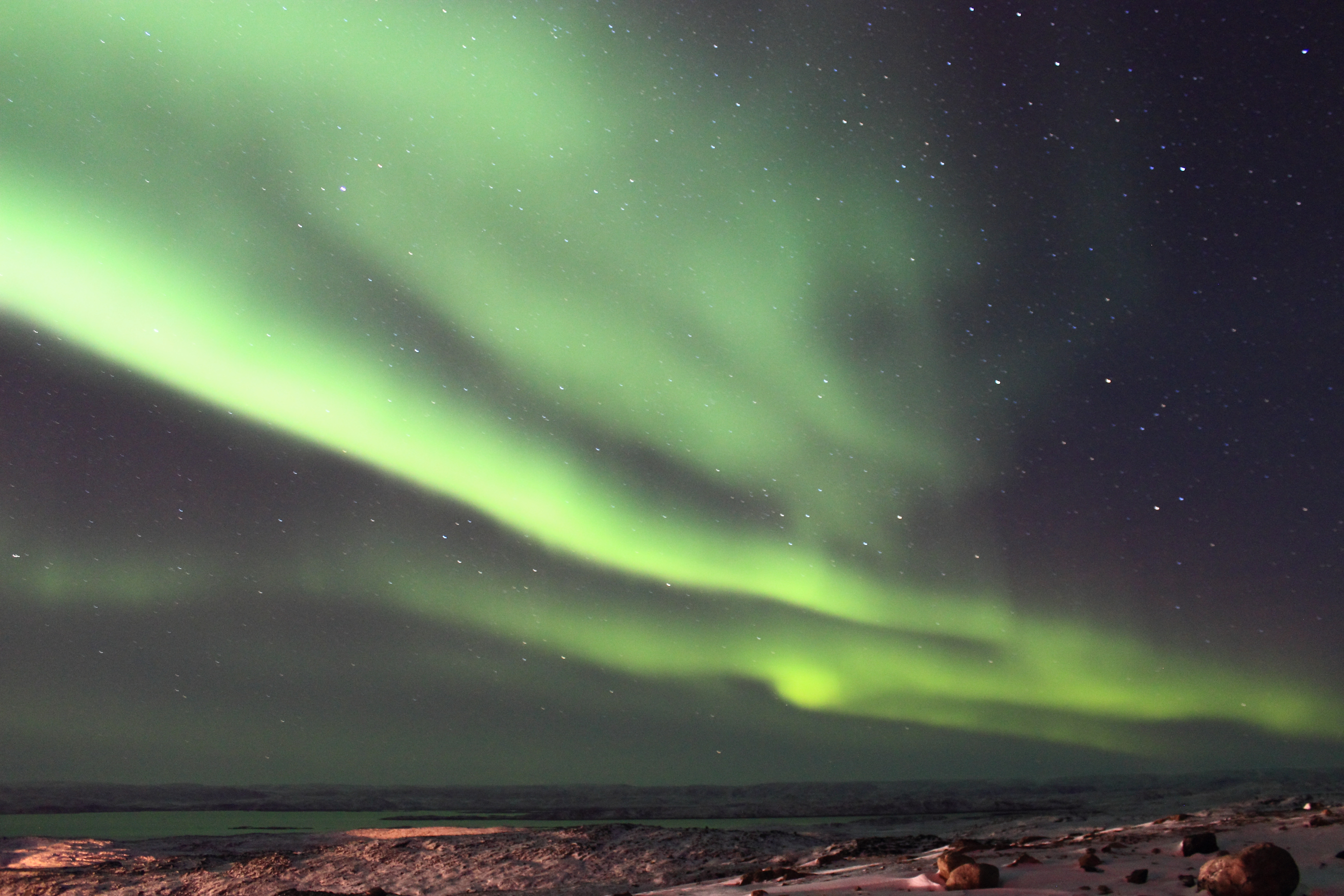
Iqaluit has a tundra climate, featuring long, cold winters, and brief summers that are too cool to permit the growth of large trees.

Iqaluit has a tundra climate (Köppen: ET, Trewartha: Ftkd) typical of the Arctic region, although it is well outside the Arctic Circle. The city features long, cold winters and brief, cool summers. Average monthly temperatures are below freezing for eight months of the year. Iqaluit averages just over 400 millimetres (16 in) of precipitation annually, much wetter than many other localities in the Arctic Archipelago, with the summer being the wettest season. Temperatures of the winter months are comparable to other northern communities further west on the continent such as Yellowknife and to some extent even Fairbanks, Alaska, even though Iqaluit is a few degrees colder than the latter. Summer temperatures are, however, much colder due to its easterly maritime position affected by the waters of the cold Baffin Island Current. This means that the tree line is much further south in the eastern part of Canada, being as southbound, in spite of low elevation, as northern Labrador.

Although it is north of the natural tree line, there are some short, south-facing imported black spruce (Picea mariana) specimens protected by snowdrifts in the winter, in addition to a few shrubs, which are woody plants. These include the Arctic willow (Salix arctica). The Arctic willow may be up to around 7.6 m (25 ft) horizontally, but only 150 mm (6 in) tall.

The climate of Iqaluit is also colder than Gulf Stream locations on the same latitude. For example, the Norwegian city of Trondheim has an annual mean temperature that is 15.2 °C (27.4 °F) milder.

The lowest temperature ever recorded was −45.6 °C (−50.1 °F) on 10 February 1967. The highest temperature ever recorded in Iqaluit was 26.8 °C (80.2 °F) on 21 July 2008.

Iqaluit's climate is changing. In 1979, the mean temperature was −9.0 °C (15.8 °F), but in 2023, it was −6.8 °C (19.8 °F). Furthermore, during the first 23 years of that period, there were 14 years which displayed a negative temperature anomaly and 9 which displayed a positive one, whereas in the second 23 years, there were only 3 negative and 20 positive temperature anomaly years.

Climate data for Iqaluit (Iqaluit Airport) WMO ID: 71909; coordinates 63°45′N 68°33′W; elevation: 33.5 m (110 ft); 1991–2020 normals, extremes 1946–present
Month	Jan	Feb	Mar	Apr	May	Jun	Jul	Aug	Sep	Oct	Nov	Dec	Year
Record high humidex	3.3	5.2	4.3	6.8	13.3	21.7	27.8	27.6	18.8	8.6	4.8	3.4	27.8
Record high °C (°F)	3.9 (39.0)	5.7 (42.3)	4.2 (39.6)	7.2 (45.0)	13.3 (55.9)	22.7 (72.9)	26.8 (80.2)	25.5 (77.9)	18.4 (65.1)	9.1 (48.4)	5.6 (42.1)	3.8 (38.8)	26.8 (80.2)
Mean daily maximum °C (°F)	−22.0 (−7.6)	−22.9 (−9.2)	−17.6 (0.3)	−8.9 (16.0)	−0.3 (31.5)	7.0 (44.6)	12.0 (53.6)	11.1 (52.0)	5.6 (42.1)	−0.5 (31.1)	−7.5 (18.5)	−14.7 (5.5)	−4.9 (23.2)
Daily mean °C (°F)	−26.0 (−14.8)	−27.0 (−16.6)	−22.4 (−8.3)	−13.5 (7.7)	−3.2 (26.2)	3.9 (39.0)	8.1 (46.6)	7.5 (45.5)	2.9 (37.2)	−3.2 (26.2)	−11.1 (12.0)	−18.9 (−2.0)	−8.6 (16.5)
Mean daily minimum °C (°F)	−29.9 (−21.8)	−31.0 (−23.8)	−27.2 (−17.0)	−18.1 (−0.6)	−6.1 (21.0)	0.7 (33.3)	4.2 (39.6)	3.8 (38.8)	0.2 (32.4)	−5.8 (21.6)	−14.7 (5.5)	−23.0 (−9.4)	−12.2 (10.0)
Record low °C (°F)	−45.0 (−49.0)	−49.0 (−56.2)	−44.7 (−48.5)	−34.2 (−29.6)	−26.1 (−15.0)	−10.2 (13.6)	−2.8 (27.0)	−2.5 (27.5)	−12.8 (9.0)	−27.1 (−16.8)	−36.2 (−33.2)	−43.4 (−46.1)	−49.0 (−56.2)
Record low wind chill	−65.5	−66.4	−62.1	−53.1	−36.0	−18.8	−7.2	−8.6	−18.6	−42.9	−56.8	−60.1	−66.4
Average precipitation mm (inches)	16.3 (0.64)	14.0 (0.55)	21.4 (0.84)	22.7 (0.89)	21.0 (0.83)	48.7 (1.92)	39.8 (1.57)	61.7 (2.43)	50.8 (2.00)	30.2 (1.19)	18.5 (0.73)	16.2 (0.64)	361.2 (14.22)
Average rainfall mm (inches)	0.4 (0.02)	0.1 (0.00)	0.0 (0.0)	0.0 (0.0)	3.3 (0.13)	46.1 (1.81)	44.4 (1.75)	65.5 (2.58)	43.9 (1.73)	12.3 (0.48)	0.7 (0.03)	0.0 (0.0)	216.6 (8.53)
Average snowfall cm (inches)	19.4 (7.6)	15.1 (5.9)	20.6 (8.1)	23.8 (9.4)	23.0 (9.1)	3.8 (1.5)	0.0 (0.0)	0.1 (0.0)	8.5 (3.3)	21.1 (8.3)	25.9 (10.2)	28.8 (11.3)	190.0 (74.8)
Average precipitation days (≥ 0.2 mm)	12.1	10.7	12.4	12.8	10.6	12.3	12.4	14.3	15.7	13.2	12.5	12.8	151.5
Average rainy days (≥ 0.2 mm)	0.06	0.06	0.06	0.06	1.7	10.7	13.1	14.8	13.2	3.8	0.24	0.0	57.7
Average snowy days (≥ 0.2 cm)	10.1	8.8	8.7	9.6	8.7	2.1	0.06	0.12	3.7	9.8	11.9	12.7	86.3
Average relative humidity (%) (at 1500 LST)	68.1	67.6	68.9	74.6	77.3	74.6	72.9	73.5	75.2	78.7	78.4	74.3	73.7
Mean monthly sunshine hours	32.4	94.0	172.2	216.5	180.5	200.2	236.8	156.8	87.9	51.4	35.6	12.6	1,476.8
Percentage possible sunshine	18.5	39.0	47.4	48.2	31.9	32.5	39.3	31.0	22.4	16.8	17.7	8.9	29.5
Average ultraviolet index	0	0	1	2	4	4	4	3	2	1	0	0	2
Source: Environment and Climate Change Canada (sunshine 1981–2010 from ECCC) (ultraviolet index from Weather Atlas)

== Cityscape ==
=== Neighbourhoods ===
- Downtown (central)
- Happy Valley (north)
- Lake Subdivision (north) – residential area
- Lower Base (south)
- Lower Iqaluit (southeast)
- North 40 (northwest) – located on the north side of the airport
- Plateau Subdivision (northwest) – residential area
- Road To Nowhere (north)
- Tundra Valley (west)
- Tundra Ridge (west) – home to two of the city's schools and youth centre
- West 40 (southwest) – commercial area

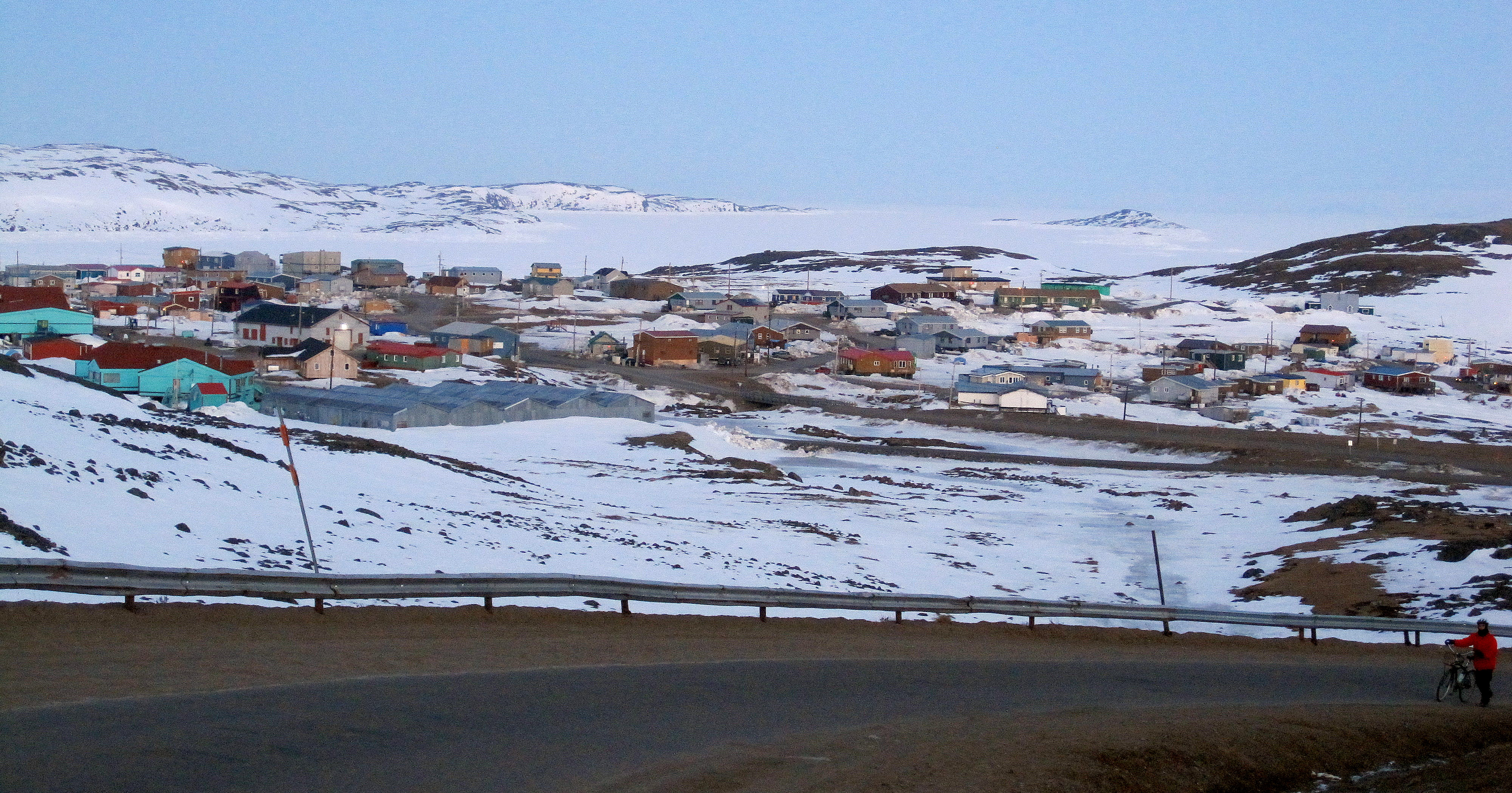
View of Apex, a suburban neighbourhood of Iqaluit

=== Suburbs ===
Apex (Niaqunngut), officially and functionally part of the City of Iqaluit, is a small community about 5 km (3.1 mi) southeast (63°43′20″N 068°26′56″W) from Iqaluit's centre and is known in Inuktitut as Niaqunngut. It is located on a small peninsula separating Koojesse Inlet from Tarr Inlet. There is a women's shelter, a church, a primary school (Nanook Elementary School), a design shop and a bed and breakfast in the community. Apex was where most Inuit lived when Iqaluit was a military site and off-limits to anyone not working at the base.

=== Architecture and attractions ===
Much of Iqaluit's architecture is functional—designed to minimize material costs, while retaining heat and withstanding the climate. Early architecture runs from the 1950s military barracks of the original DEW line installation, through the 1970s white hyper-modernist fibreglass block of the Nakasuk School and Municipal Offices and Arena, to the lines of the steel-reinforced concrete high-rise complex on the hill above it. A number of older Hudson's Bay Company (HBC) and early 1950s buildings have been retained and restored in Apex (the former nursing station has been revived as the Rannva Bed and Breakfast, the HBC buildings as an art gallery). The newer buildings are more colourful and diverse, and closer to the norms of southern architecture.

The principal exception is the Nunavut Legislative Assembly Building, which is remarkable for its colourful interior, adorned with some of the very best in Inuit art. A new legislative building is in planning to be developed and built outside the city on the Apex Road.

Another distinctive building is St. Jude's Anglican Cathedral, see of the Anglican Diocese of The Arctic, which is a white building shaped like an igloo. The old St Jude's Cathedral, also in the shape of an igloo, was built in 1972 but arson severely affected the Cathedral structure and interior on 5 November 2005, and it was demolished on 1 June 2006. Its altar was built by the parishioners, under the guidance of Markoosie Peter, a traditional master carpenter. It was shaped like a traditional Inuit sled, and the cross composed of two crossed narwhal tusks.

In December 2010, the exterior of a similarly shaped replacement cathedral was completed, and interior work was planned for 2011 with a potential opening for Christmas 2011. The current building, informally referred to as the Igloo Cathedral, was opened on 3 June 2012. The unique building, in the shape of an igloo, has traditionally been a landmark and tourist attraction in Iqaluit, besides its important spiritual role for Iqalummiut (people of Iqaluit).

On a ridge overlooking the city is the distinctive blue and white Inuksuk High School. The school is made up of four square sections joined that give a cloverleaf shape when viewed from the air.

The city is also the location of the Nunatta Sunakkutaangit Museum, which houses a large collection of Inuit and Arctic objects. The museum is housed in a restored and extended Hudson's Bay Company building, clad in the HBC signature red and white, transported to Iqaluit from its original site on the Apex Beach.

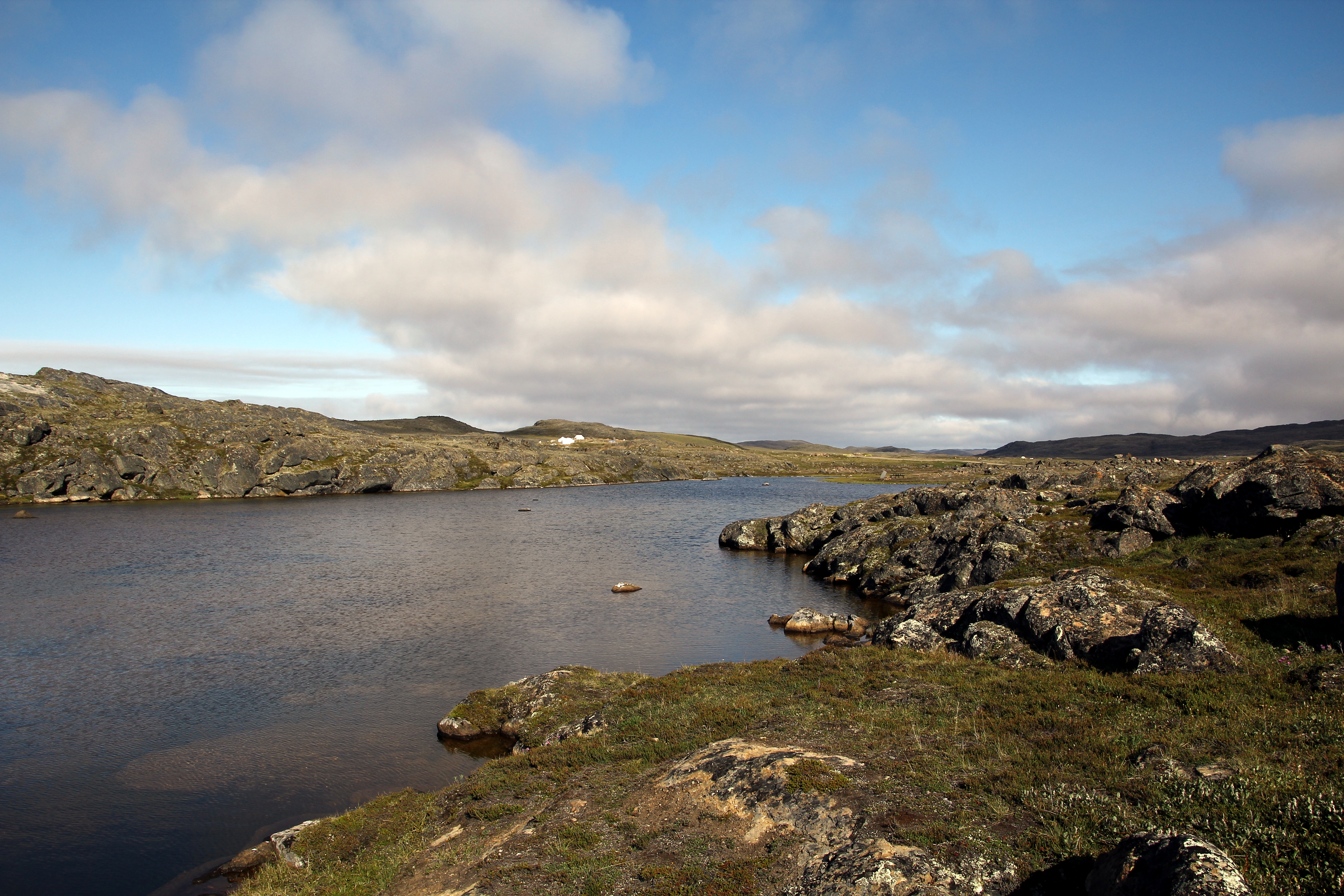
Sylvia Grinnell River in Sylvia Grinnell Territorial Park. The territorial park is located just outside the city limits.

Just west of Iqaluit is the Sylvia Grinnell Territorial Park. This park is dominated by the valley of the Sylvia Grinnell River. A small visitor's centre with viewing platform is located on top of a hill overlooking scenic waterfalls, tidal flats and traditional fishing sites.

Nearby on an island near Peterhead Inlet, is the Qaummaarviit Territorial Park. It is a site with a long Inuit history and numerous artifacts have been recovered, including the remains of 11 semi-buried sod houses.

A little farther, across Frobisher Bay, are the Katannilik Territorial Park Reserve and the Soper River, a Canadian Heritage River, forming a park corridor linking Iqaluit along traditional overland travel routes with Kimmirut (formerly Lake Harbour). Frobisher Bay extends for almost 110 km (70 mi) to the east, with moderate hills, glaciers and traditional and summer camp sites, opening into the Davis Strait, which divides Nunavut from Greenland.

Iqaluit, like many Nunavut communities, has a volunteer-run annual spring festival. Called Toonik Tyme, it involves a combination of traditional Inuit activities combined with more modern events, while the Alianait Music and Arts Festival is held for a week each 21 June. The festival has attracted Canadian and international artists such as Joshua Haulli, Quantum Tangle, Washboard Hank and Namgar.

== Demographics ==
Federal census population history of Iqaluit
Year	Pop.	±%
1971	2,050	—
1976	2,320	+13.2%
1981	2,333	+0.6%
1986	2,947	+26.3%
1991	3,552	+20.5%
1996	4,220	+18.8%
2001	5,236	+24.1%
2006	6,184	+18.1%
2011	6,699	+8.3%
2016	7,740	+15.5%
2021	7,429	−4.0%
Source: Statistics Canada

In the 2021 Canadian census conducted by Statistics Canada, Iqaluit had a population of 7,429 living in 2,708 of its 3,297 total private dwellings, a change of –4% from its 2016 population of 7,740. With a land area of 51.58 km^{2} (19.92 sq mi), it had a population density of 144.0/km^{2} (373.0/sq mi) in 2021.

The median value of these dwellings is $376,639, quite a bit higher than the national median at $280,552. The average household has about 2.8 people living in it, and the average family has 1.4 children living at home with them. The median (after-tax) household income in Iqaluit is quite high, $98,921, almost double the national rate at $54,089. The median income for an individual in the city is also high, $60,688. 5.9 per cent of people (over 15 years old) are either divorced or separated, which is quite a bit lower than the national rate at 8.6 per cent. Also, 53.3 per cent of the population is either married or living with a common-law partner.

Iqaluit has quite a young population; the median age of the population is more than 10 years younger than the national rate, 30.1 years old compared to 40.6 years old.

For those over the age of 25:

- 75.7% are high school educated (15.9% as their highest level of education)
- 59.8% are post-secondary school educated
- 24.3% have no certificate, diploma or degree

The 2021 census reported that immigrants (individuals born outside Canada) comprise 750 persons or 10.3% of the total population of Iqaluit. Of the total immigrant population, the top countries of origin were Philippines (195 persons or 26.0%), Cameroon (50 persons or 6.7%), United Kingdom (40 persons or 5.3%), Nigeria (40 persons or 5.3%), Zimbabwe (40 persons or 5.3%), United States of America (35 persons or 4.7%), India (25 persons or 3.3%), Pakistan (20 persons or 2.7%), China (20 persons or 2.7%), Jamaica (20 persons or 2.7%), and Ethiopia (20 persons or 2.7%).

=== Ethnicity ===
As of 2016, Iqaluit has the most Inuit in both numbers (3,900) and percentages (59.1 per cent), of all Canadian cities with populations greater than 5,000.

Panethnic groups in the City of Iqaluit (2001–2021)
Panethnic group	2021		2016		2011		2006		2001	
Panethnic group	Pop.	%	Pop.	%	Pop.	%	Pop.	%	Pop.	%
Indigenous	4,055	55.47%	4,505	59.35%	4,040	61.21%	3,650	59.98%	3,065	59%
European (Note: Statistic includes all persons that did not make up part of a visible minority or an indigenous identity.)	2,350	32.15%	2,500	32.94%	2,265	34.32%	2,235	36.73%	2,030	39.08%
African	395	5.4%	225	2.96%	70	1.06%	45	0.74%	25	0.48%
Southeast Asian (Note: Statistic includes total responses of "Filipino" and "Southeast Asian" under visible minority section on census.)	235	3.21%	165	2.17%	70	1.06%	35	0.58%	15	0.29%
South Asian	100	1.37%	65	0.86%	55	0.83%	30	0.49%	15	0.29%
East Asian (Note: Statistic includes total responses of "Chinese", "Korean", and "Japanese" under visible minority section on census.)	55	0.75%	60	0.79%	60	0.91%	65	1.07%	25	0.48%
Latin American	40	0.55%	25	0.33%	15	0.23%	10	0.16%	10	0.19%
Middle Eastern (Note: Statistic includes total responses of "West Asian" and "Arab" under visible minority section on census.)	35	0.48%	30	0.4%	10	0.15%	10	0.16%	10	0.19%
Other (Note: Statistic includes total responses of "Visible minority, n.i.e." and "Multiple visible minorities" under visible minority section on census.)	40	0.55%	10	0.13%	10	0.15%	10	0.16%	0	0%
Total responses	7,310	98.4%	7,590	98.06%	6,600	98.52%	6,085	98.4%	5,195	99.22%
Total population	7,429	100%	7,740	100%	6,699	100%	6,184	100%	5,236	100%
Note: Totals greater than 100% due to multiple origin responses

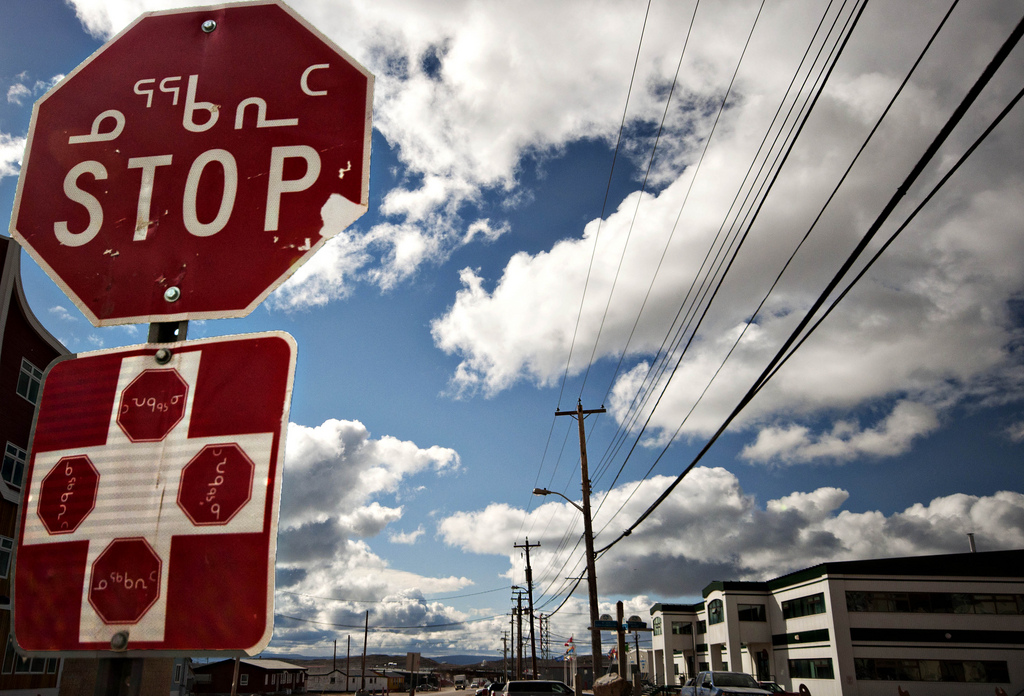
A stop sign in Iqaluit. The sign features the two most-spoken languages in the city, English and Inuktitut.

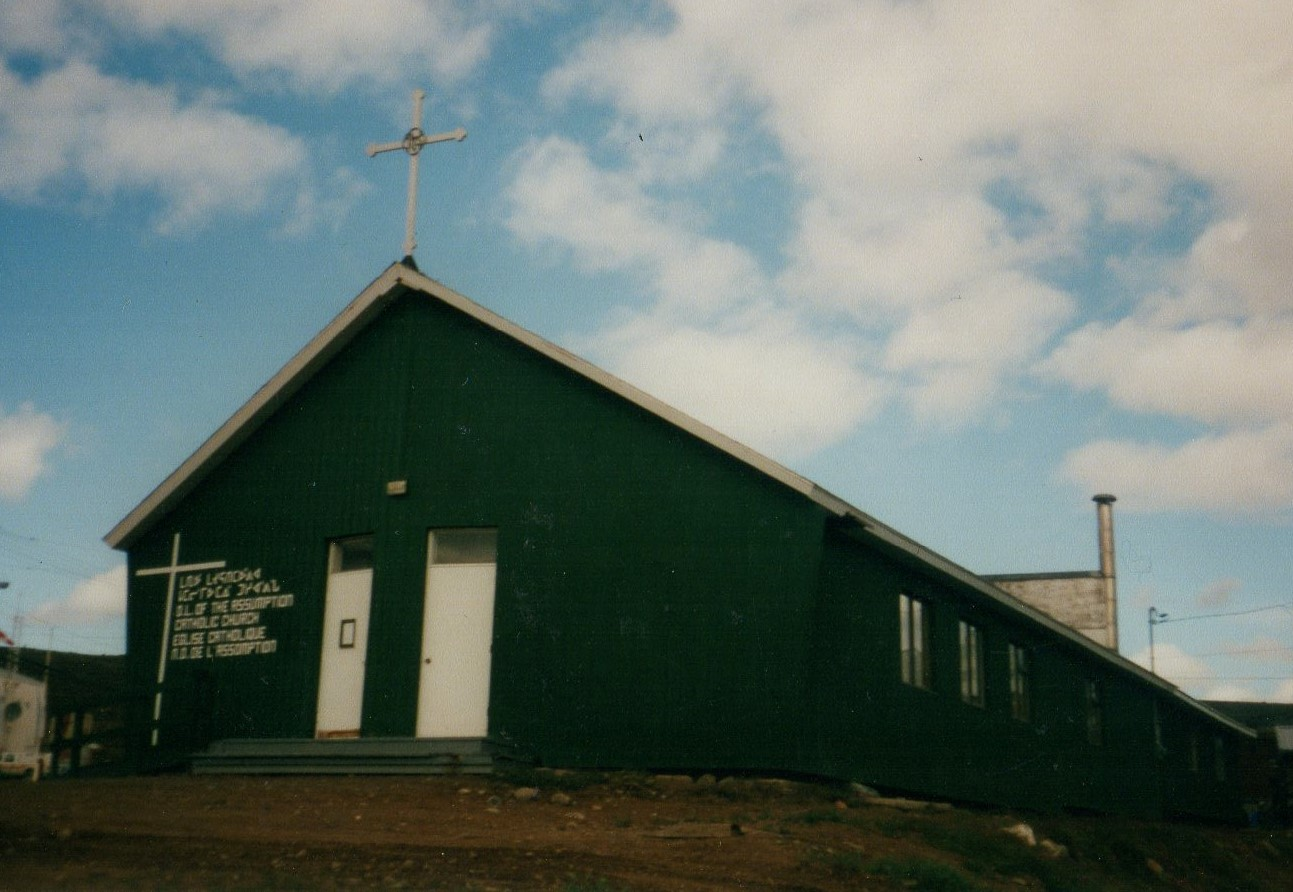
Catholic church

=== Language ===
There is no majority mother tongue in Iqaluit. As of the 2021 Canadian census, 49.1 per cent reported their mother tongue as being English, and 30.0 per cent also reported their mother tongue as Inuktitut. English is spoken by 97.2 per cent of Iqaluit residents, whereas only 53.1 per cent can speak Inuktitut. French was the mother tongue of 5.9 per cent of the population, which is the same figure as the population that can speak the language. As of 2012, "Pirurvik, Iqaluit's Inuktitut language training centre, has a new goal: to train instructors from Nunavut communities to teach Inuktitut in different ways and in their own dialects when they return home."

Mother tongue (2021):

- English as first language: 49.1%
- Inuktut as first language: 30.1
  - Inuktitut as first language: 30.0
  - Inuinnaqtun as first language: 0.1%
- French as first language: 5.9%
- English and French as first language: 1.1%
- Other as first language: 13.8%

=== Religion ===
According to the 2021 census, religious groups in Iqaluit included:

- Christianity (3,975 persons or 54.4%)
- Irreligion (3,060 persons or 41.9%)
- Islam (90 persons or 1.2%)
- Indigenous spirituality (50 persons or 0.7%)
- Hinduism (30 persons or 0.4%)
- Judaism (20 persons or 0.3%)
- Buddhism (10 persons or 0.1%)
- Other (75 persons or 1.0%)

== Education ==
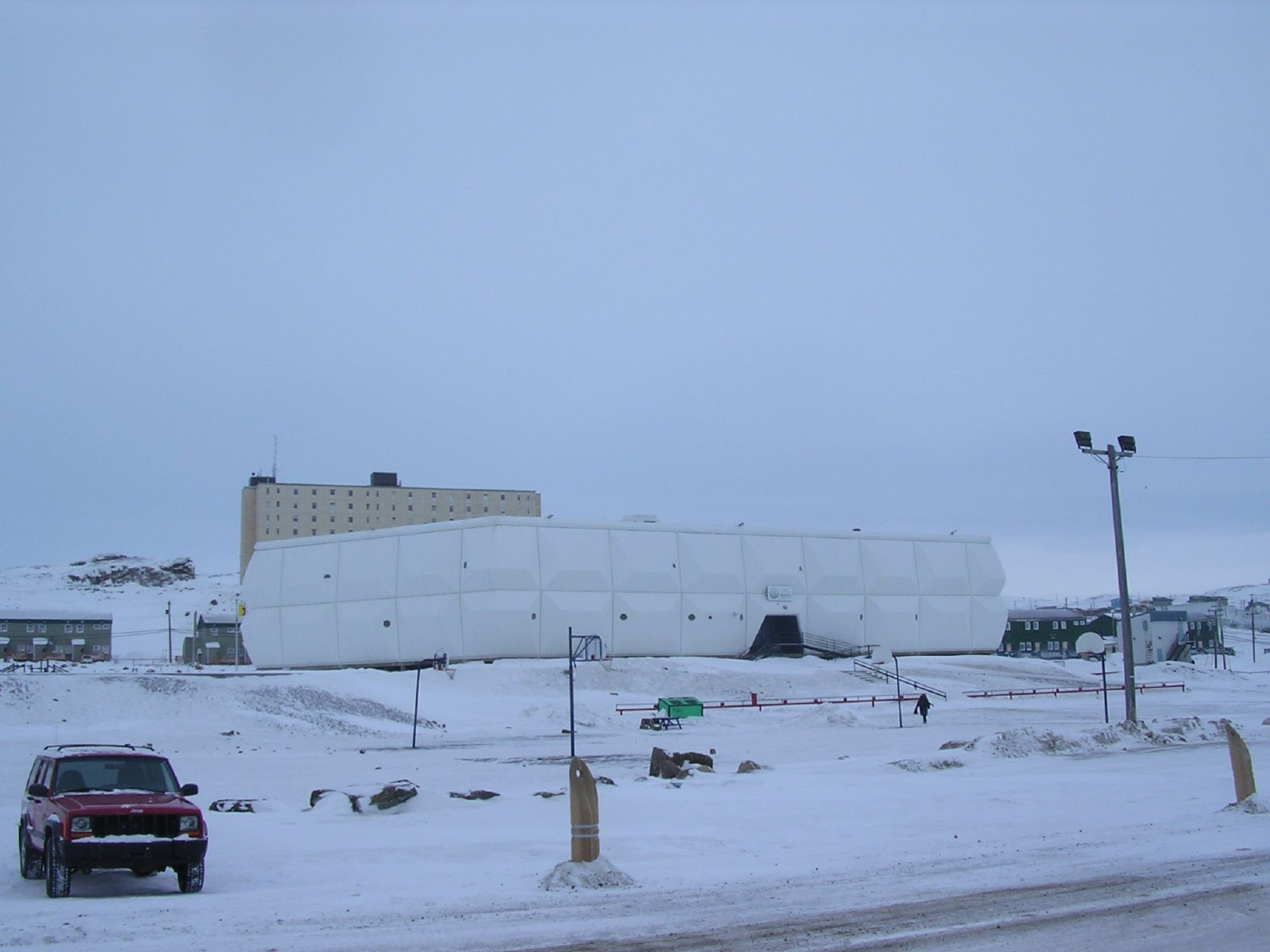
Nakasuk School is one of six publicly funded schools in the city.

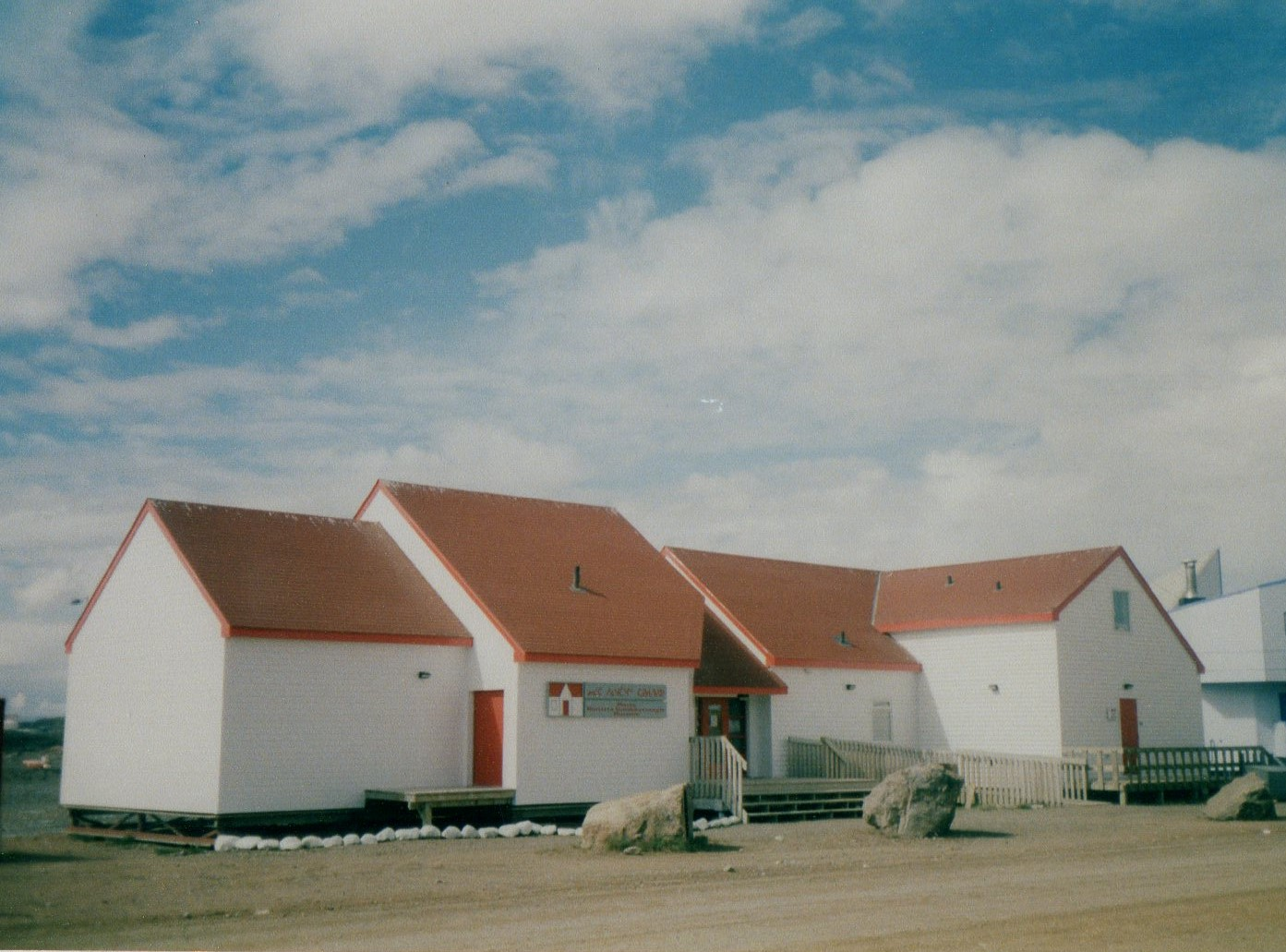
Nunatta Sunakkutaangit Museum

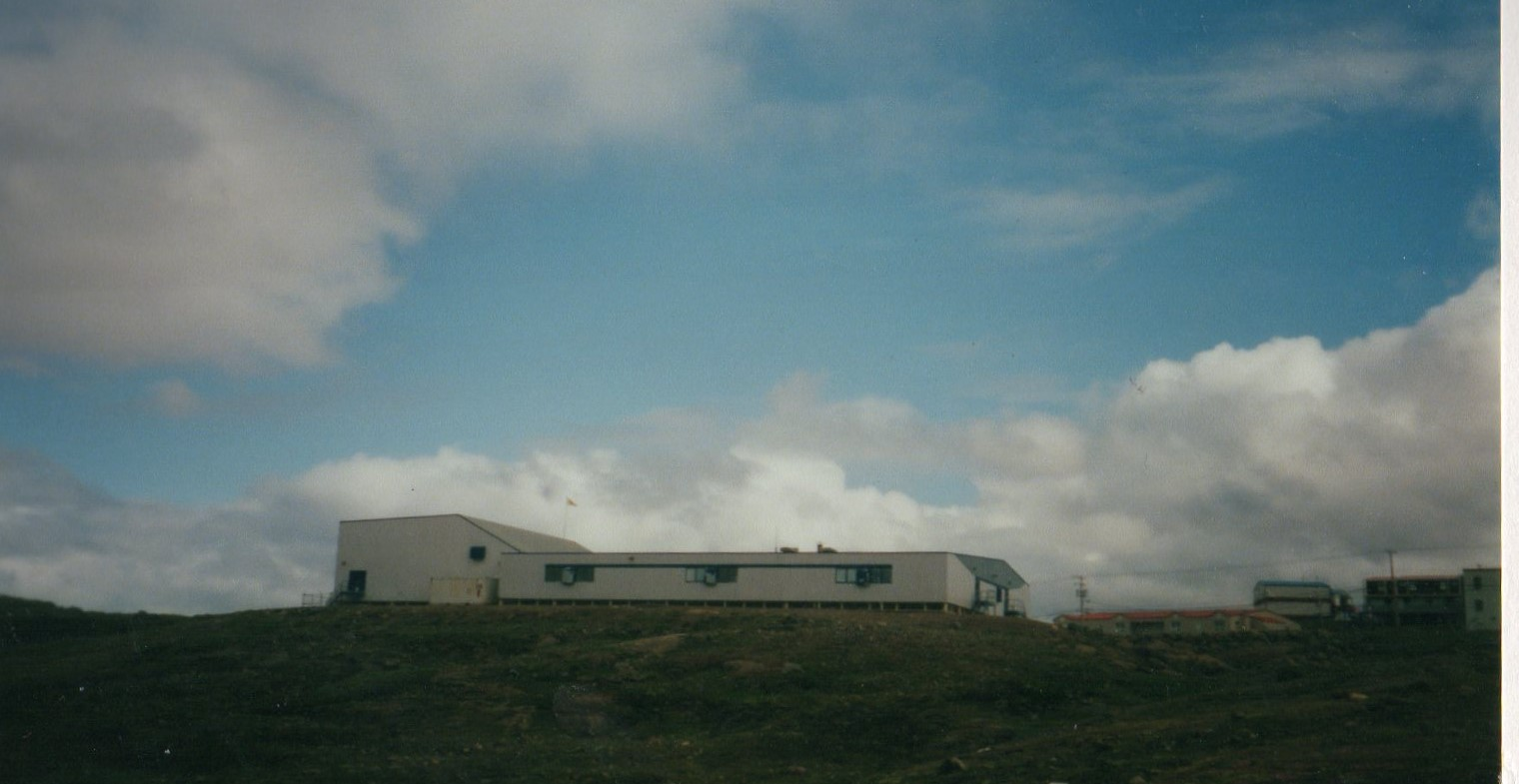
Joamie Ilinniarvik School

The Qikiqtani School Operations based in Pond Inlet operates five schools in the area. Nanook Elementary School, located in Apex, Nakasuk School and Joamie Ilinniarvik School offer kindergarten to grade 5. Aqsarniit Ilinniarvik School offers grades 6 to 8 and Inuksuk High School offers grades 9 to 12.

The Commission scolaire francophone du Nunavut runs École des Trois-Soleils and offers kindergarten to grade 12.

At the post-secondary level there are two, Nunavut Arctic College (Nunatta Campus) and Akitsiraq Law School.

== Infrastructure ==
=== Emergency services ===
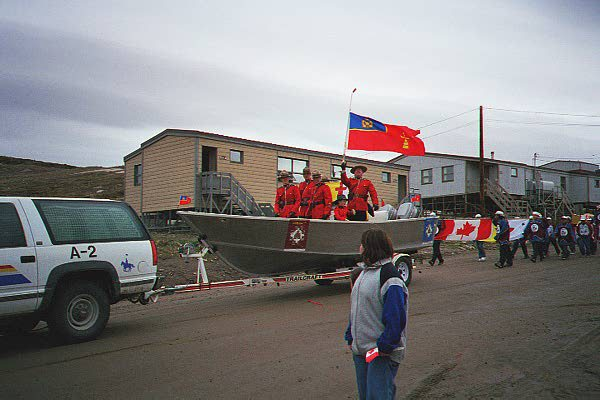
Royal Canadian Mounted Police during a Canada Day parade in 1999. Policing is provided by the RCMP's V Division.

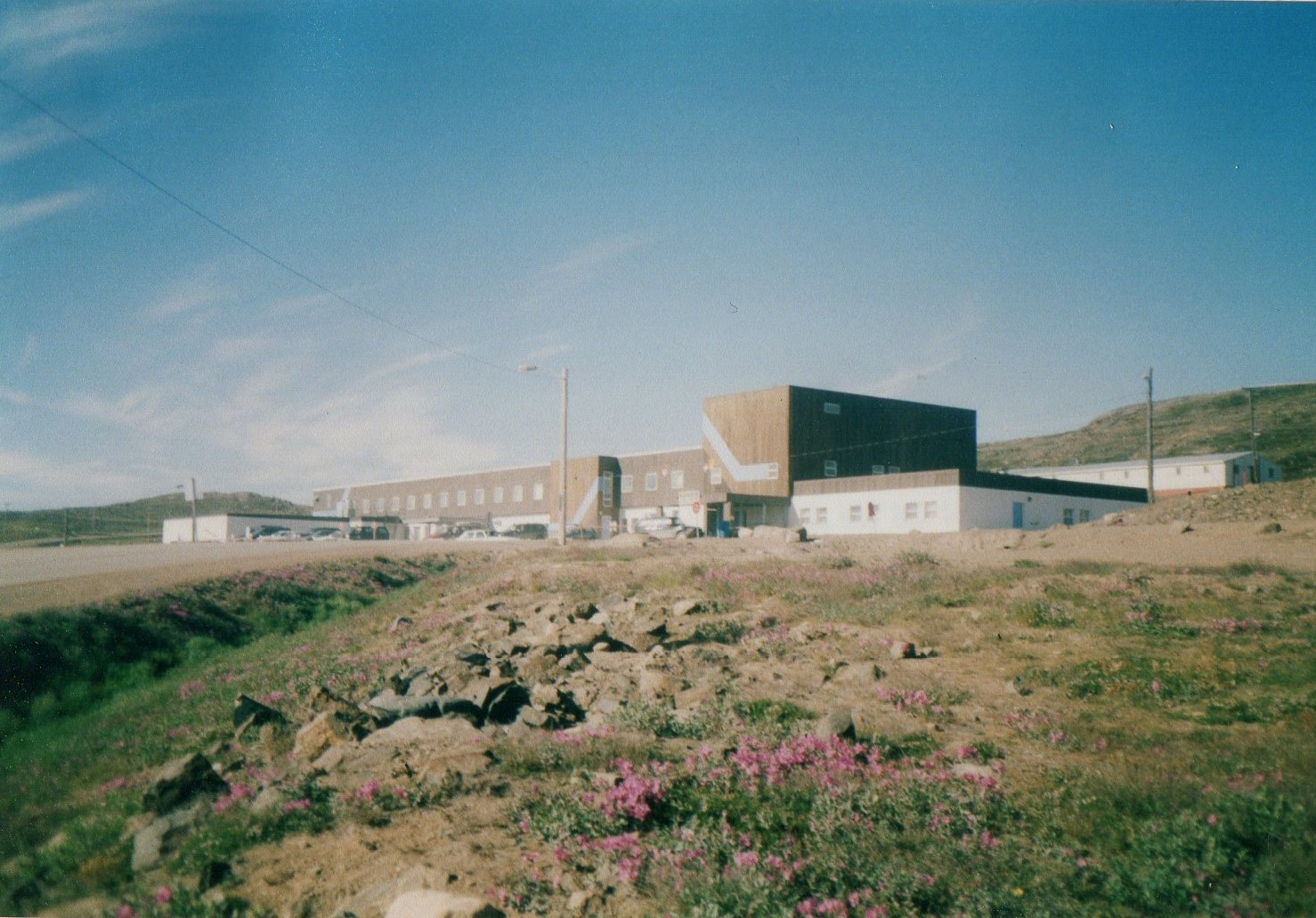
Iqaluit Hospital

Emergency services (fire and ambulance) are provided by city from a single station on Niaqunngusiariaq.

The emergency services fleet consists of:

- 1 engine
- 1 ladder
- 2 staff vehicles
- 3 ambulances

Iqaluit Airport Emergency Services is responsible for fire services at the airport. Following a fire at the airport in 1998, the Government of Nunavut re-opened the fire station at the airport. Their fleet consists of:

- Waltek C-5500 ARFF
- Oshkosh T3000 ARFF

Policing in Iqaluit, as with the rest of Nunavut, is contracted to the Royal Canadian Mounted Police (RCMP) V Division and the city is home to the divisional headquarters.

Iqaluit also has a Municipal Enforcement Service that enforces local city bylaws. The services include handling of noise and traffic violations and animal control.

=== Medical services ===
Qikiqtani General Hospital is the primary care facility in the city. The local public health office also provides primary care services like STI screening and tuberculosis-related services. Two dental clinics exist in the city.

=== Sports facilities ===
Iqaluit features two arenas, the Arctic Winter Games Arena and Arnaitok, the Iqaluit Aquaplex, a curling rink, Timmianut Pikiuqarvik, an eighteen hole disc golf course, the Frobisher Inn Fitness Centre, in the W.G. Brown Building / Astro Hill Complex, a golf course, outdoor basketball courts, soccer nets, seasonal outdoor ice rinks, a shooting range, a skatepark, and more.

=== Waste and water treatment ===
The city's infrastructure is stressed by growth and a lack of means to upgrade. Waste from the city is disposed of into an open air dump on Akilliq Drive (West 40) located south of the city.

Although the city has water treatment facilities, raw sewage from the city is often dumped untreated into nearby Frobisher Bay.

As the dump has reached capacity, the city plans to open a second dump 9 km (5.6 mi) north of the city. Iqaluit does not have a recycling program in place; all recyclable materials are sent into the waste stream.

In October 2021, residents of Iqaluit experienced a water crisis when their tap water was found to be contaminated with fuel. The contamination was traced to a decades-old underground fuel tank that had leaked into the city's water supply. The crisis led to a state of emergency, with residents relying on bottled water and water from nearby rivers for drinking, cooking, and other daily needs. The situation highlighted the challenges of providing safe and reliable water services in remote and Arctic communities.

== Transportation ==
Iqaluit is the smallest Canadian capital in terms of population, and the only capital that is not connected to other settlements by a highway. Located on an island remote from the Canadian highway system, Iqaluit is generally only accessible by aircraft and, subject to ice conditions, by boat.

Iqaluit Airport is a modern facility with a runway long enough for most modern jet aircraft. A new, larger passenger terminal building north of the old terminal was completed in 2018.

Canadian North serves Iqaluit from Ottawa, Yellowknife, and several communities in Nunavut. Locally based airlines Air Nunavut, Canadian Helicopters, Nunasi Helicopters, and Unaalik Aviation provide air charters, and Air Nunavut and Keewatin Air provide MEDIVAC / air ambulance service. Jazz Aviation provided daily service to Iqaluit from Ottawa in 2010 and 2011, but cancelled service due to rising fuel costs, which prevented the route from being profitable.

Iqaluit shared its runway with the Royal Canadian Air Force until the Canadian Armed Forces stopped using Iqaluit as a Canadian NORAD Region Forward Operating Location. The barracks and CF-188 hangars are maintained. The airport has been a centre for cold-weather testing of new aircraft, such as the Airbus A380 in February 2006.

A deep-sea port opened in Iqaluit in July 2023, after five years of construction. The port features a dredged fixed dock, mooring space, a cargo laydown area, an all-tide barge ramp, and a fuel manifold.

Initial plans for the port included facilities for a vehicle ferry connection to Happy Valley-Goose Bay, Newfoundland and Labrador, however these plans were dropped due to high cost. Experienced locals also cross the Hudson Strait from the Canadian mainland when it freezes over, either on foot or by dog sled or snowmobile, a distance of over 100 km (62 mi).

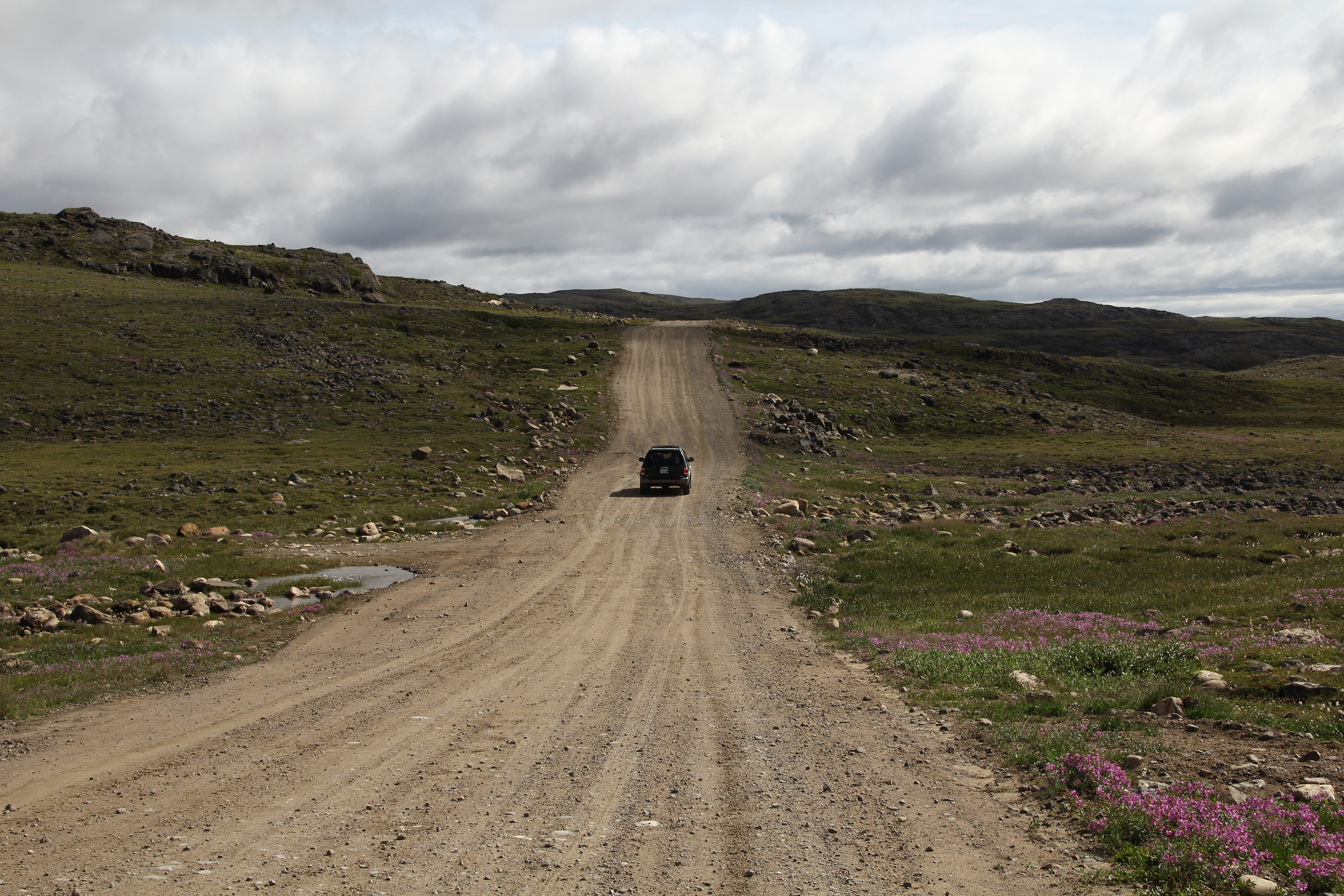
Iqaluit has a local road system that does not extend far beyond the city limits. During the winter, remote areas near the city are only accessible by snowmobiles, dog sled, or foot.

Iqaluit has a local road system only stretching from the nearby community of Apex to the Sylvia Grinnell Territorial Park, 1 km (0.62 mi) west of town. Iqaluit has no public transportation, although there is citywide taxi service. Iqaluit Public Transit used to offer bus service in the city, but the service was cancelled due to low ridership. In May 2024, a privately owned company announced that they plan to offer a shuttle bus service utilizing a 32-seater bus from the community of Apex to the Iqaluit Airport, also with plans to collaborate with the city's administration, with hopes to get more vehicles and routes. They launched a new service named Iqaluit Transit in March 2026 with a single route that runs on weekdays and Saturdays. A base fare of $5 is payable with cash, credit cards, and a new smart card. Motor cars are increasing in number, to the extent of causing occasional traffic jams known locally as "the rush minute". The cost of shipping automobiles and the wear-and-tear of the harsh Arctic climate combined with its notoriously rough roadways mean that snowmobiles remain the preferred form of personal transportation. All-terrain vehicles are also common in most of the Canadian Arctic. Snowmobiles are used to travel within the city and in the surrounding area. In winter, dog sleds are still used, but primarily for recreation. In winter, the nearby Qaummaarviit Territorial Park and the more remote Katannilik Territorial Park Reserve are only accessible by snowmobile, dog sled or foot. In the summer, both are accessible by boat. Most major roads within Iqaluit are paved with asphalt, but local and smaller roads are gravel. Roads do not have traffic signals, but use stop signs to control intersections.

Residents and businesses identify their locations mostly by building number, and occasionally by the name of a prominent structure. Residents know where in the city certain series of building numbers are located; numbers tend to be aggregated in blocks, so someone might say that they live in the 2600s. Around 2003, street names were developed, although there were delays in finalizing them and posting the signs. Street numbers have not been assigned, and building numbers continue to be used. Iqaluit is the only Canadian capital city not to have traffic signals, although some have been installed on a temporary basis.

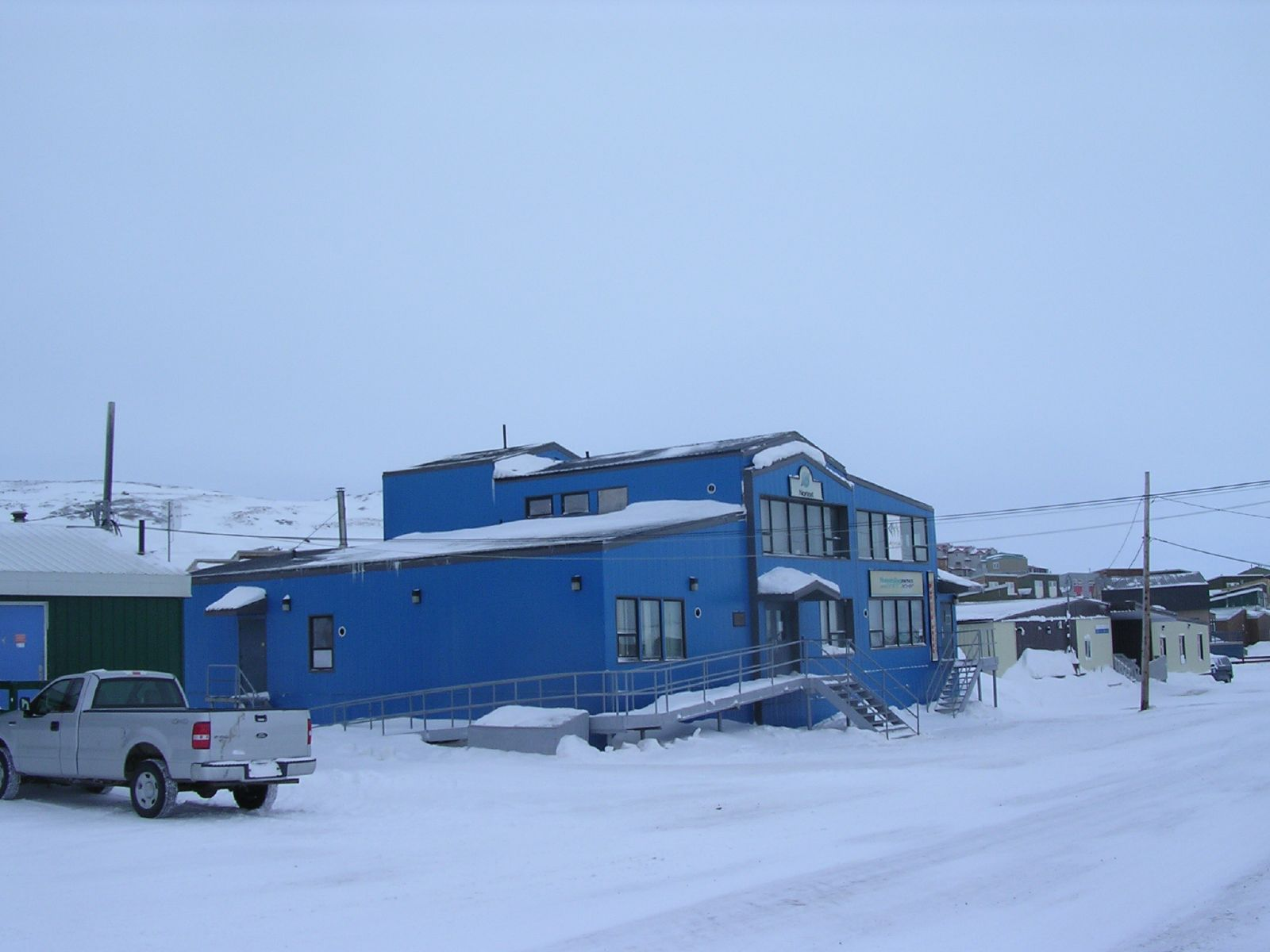
Offices for the Nunatsiaq News. Nunatsiaq News is one of two weekly newspapers that circulate in Iqaluit.

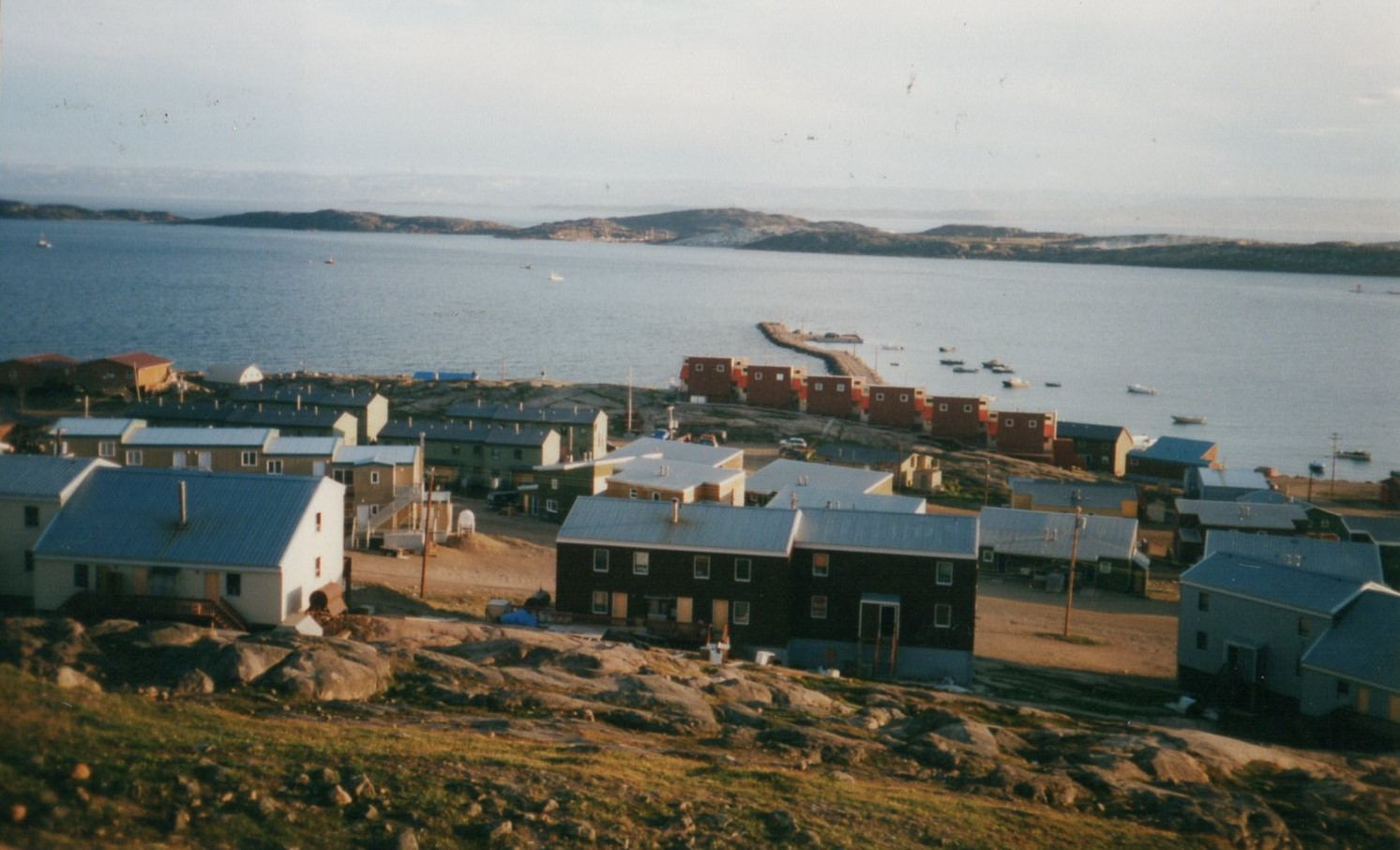
Harbour view

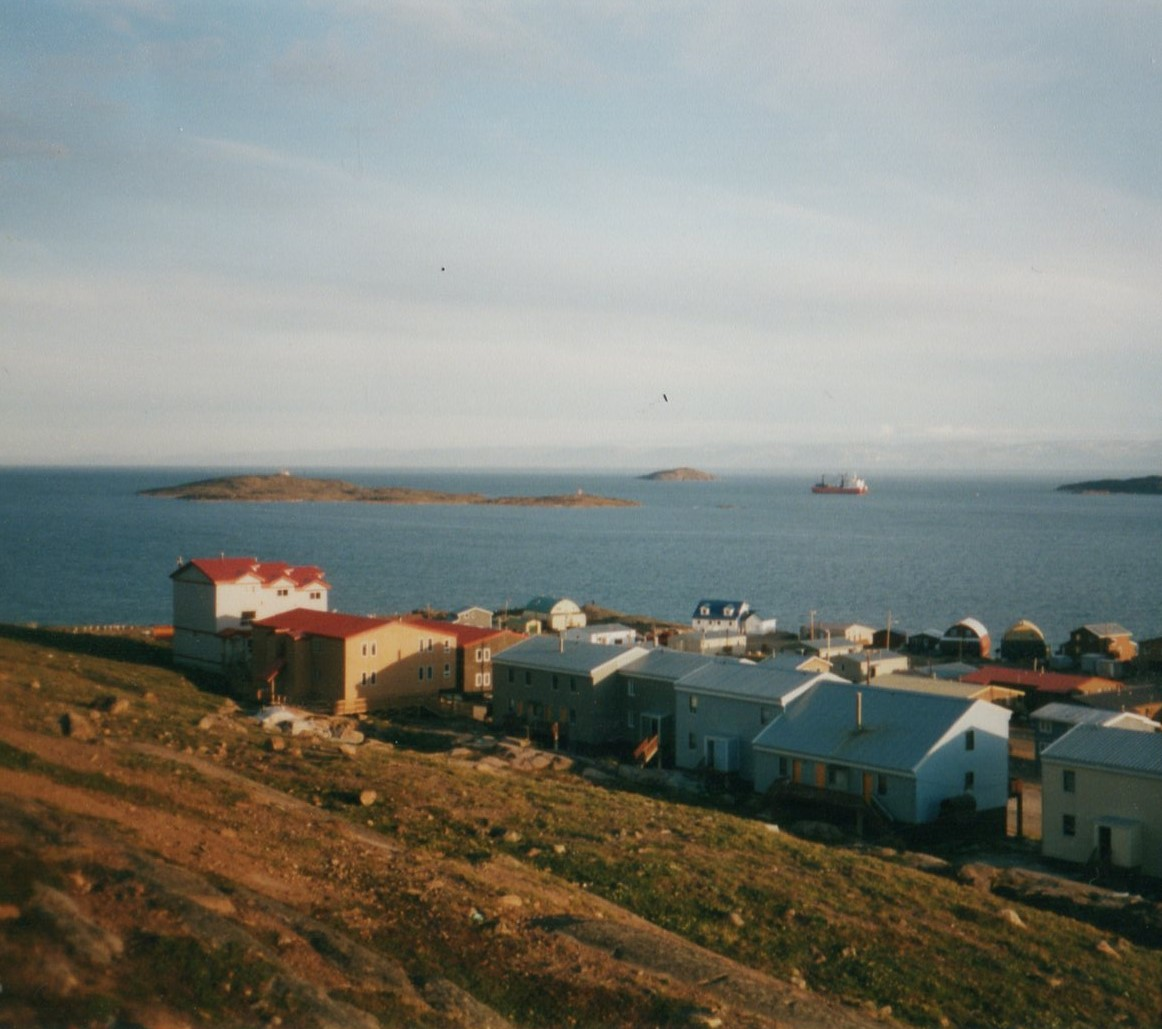
Harbour view

== Communications ==
Landline services in Iqaluit (established in 1958 by Bell Canada) and throughout northern Canada (established by Northwestel in five western Nunavut communities, and by Bell Canada elsewhere in Nunavut), are provided since 1992 by Northwestel.

Cell service is provided by Ice Wireless, Bell Mobility, and Qiniq.

Internet service is available through Northwestel, Ice Wireless, Qiniq (SSi Canada), Starlink and Meshnet. Meshnet Community WiFi is a free community WiFi and paid service available in most areas of the city. Free services include access to Isuma.tv, and many other resources.

== Media ==
=== Press ===
- Nunatsiaq News
- News/North

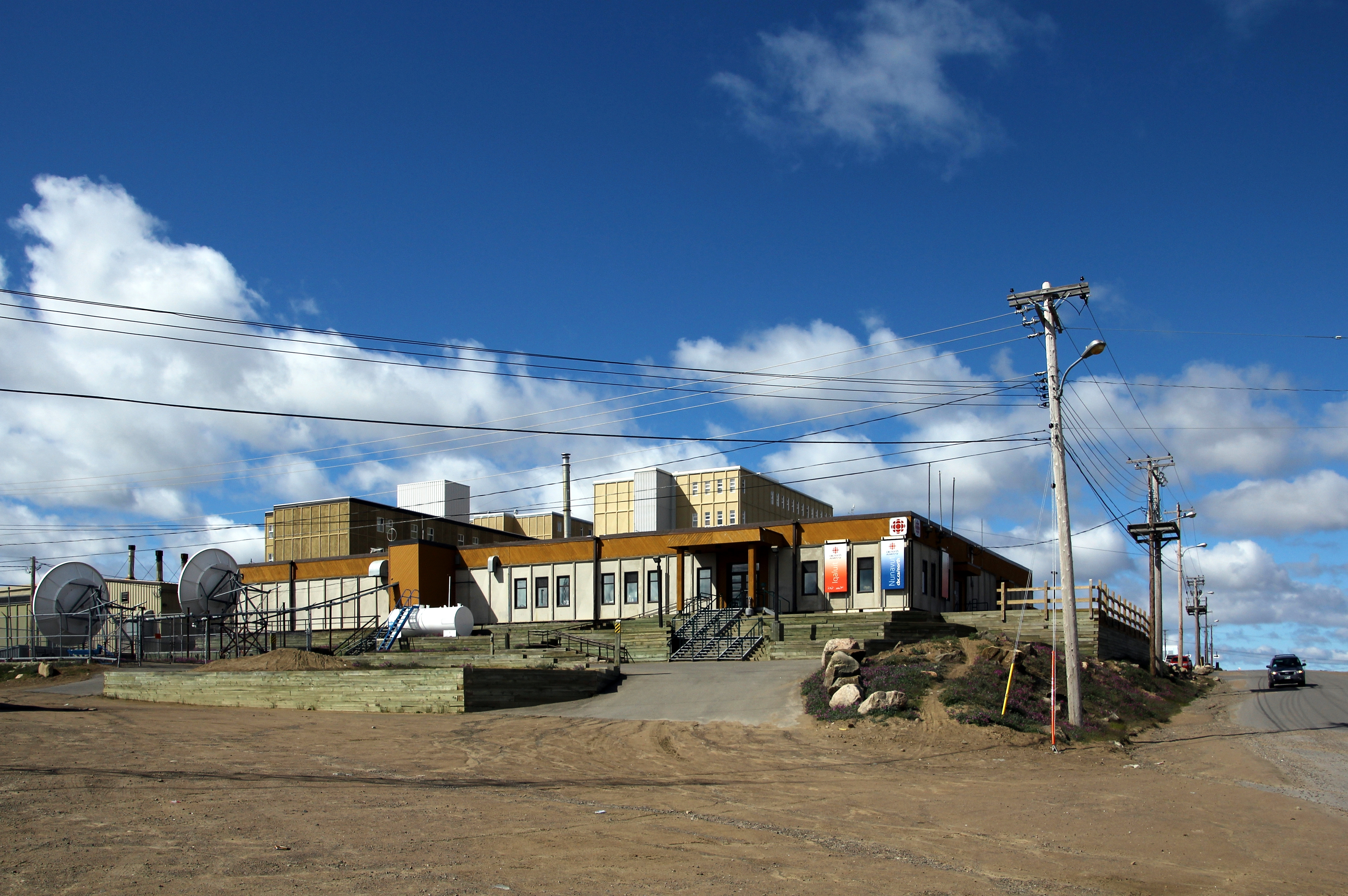
Broadcast studio for CFFB radio, and the regional network centre for Nunavut for CBC North

=== Radio ===
Frequency	Call sign	Branding	Format	Owner	Notes
AM 1230 & FM 91.1	CFFB	CBC Radio One	Talk radio, public radio	Canadian Broadcasting Corporation	Part of CBC North; broadcasts English and Inuktitut programming
FM 88.3	CBM-FM-3	CBC Music	Assorted music, public radio	Canadian Broadcasting Corporation	Rebroadcaster of CBM-FM (Montreal)
FM 93.3	CIQA-FM	Weatheradio Canada	Weather radio	Meteorological Service of Canada	Rebroadcaster of VEV284 (Iqaluit Airport)
FM 99.9	CKIQ-FM	Ice FM	Classic rock	Northern Lights Entertainment	
FM 103.5	CKGC-FM	Capital FM	Oldies	Northern Lights Entertainment	
FM 107.3	CFRT-FM	107.3 CFRT	Community radio	Association des Francophones du Nunavut	French language community radio

=== Television ===
OTA channel	Call sign	Network	Notes
8.1	CH0283	Uvagut TV	Terrestrial feed
10.1	CH4161	Aboriginal Peoples Television Network	Eastern Time Zone feed
12.1	CH2260	Ici Radio-Canada Télé	Community-owned rebroadcaster of CBFT-DT (Montreal)
17.1	CH4584	CBC North	Community-owned broadcaster of CFYK-DT (Yellowknife, Northwest Territories)
35.1	CH0977	Legislative Assembly of Nunavut and the Northwest Territories	Branded on-air as "Legislative Television"
47.1	CH9112	Independent station	Branded on-air as "Isuma Local Media"

Iqaluit was served by CFFB-TV channel 8, a CBC Television/CBC North repeater of CFYK-DT (Yellowknife) until 31 July 2012 when it was closed because of budget cuts at the CBC.

== Notable people ==
- Eva Aariak, politician, former Member of the Legislative Assembly (MLA) and second Premier of Nunavut
- Paul-André Brasseur, former child actor
- Alexander Fathoullin, speed skater
- Ann Meekitjuk Hanson, former Commissioner of Nunavut
- Kenn Harper, grocer, amateur historian, and entrepreneur
- Lucie Idlout, rock singer, songwriter
- Matty McNair, US-born explorer
- Mosha Michael, filmmaker
- Simonie Michael, first Inuk to be elected to what is now the Legislative Assembly of the Northwest Territories in 1966
- Nakasuk, founder of Iqaluit
- Paul Okalik, lawyer, politician, member of the Legislative Assembly of Nunavut, first Premier of Nunavut and former Speaker of the Legislative Assembly of Nunavut. Unsuccessful federal Liberal candidate for Nunavut
- Abe Okpik, politician, worked on Project Surname to obtain family names for Inuit rather than disc numbers and first Inuk to sit (appointed) on what is now the NWT Legislative Assembly
- Dennis Patterson, politician, former MLA and Premier of the NWT (prior to division), former Canadian Senator for Nunavut
- Bryan Pearson, politician, former MLA, first mayor of Iqaluit, businessman
- Ed Picco, politician, former MLA in NWT and Nunavut
- Annabella Piugattuk, actress
- Elisapee Sheutiapik, ex-politician & mayor
- Enooyaq Sudlovenick, marine biologist
- Hunter Tootoo, territorial and federal politician, and former speaker of the Nunavut Legislative Assembly
- Sheila Watt-Cloutier, politician, environmental activist, Nobel nominee
- Anna Lambe, actress

== See also ==
- List of municipalities in Nunavut
