= Arctic Winter Games Arena =

Multi-purpose arena in Iqaluit, Nunavut

Coordinates: 63°44′24″N 68°28′42″W

- Location in Nunavut
- Location: Iqaluit, Nunavut, Canada
- Capacity: 2,500
- Type: Ice arena

Construction
- Opened: October 2001
- Renovated: 2009

The Arctic Winter Games Arena is a 2,500-seat multi-purpose arena in Iqaluit, Nunavut, Canada. It opened to the public in October 2001. This arena was initially built to house the hockey and speed skating events of the 2002 Arctic Winter Games, but it is now used as a youth centre and to host large community events.

The venue hosted CBC Television's Hockey Day in Canada in 2003, and a White Stripes concert in 2007. The surface of the arena had become unusable after a portion of the floor sank in 2006, however, on August 18, 2009, $2.2 million was allocated by the Government of Canada to repair the surface.

In 2024, a BeaverTails location opened in the arena.
