= Qikiqtani General Hospital =

Hospital in Iqaluit, Nunavut, Canada

Coordinates: 63°45′2.16″N 68°30′35.28″W

- Nunavut Department of Health
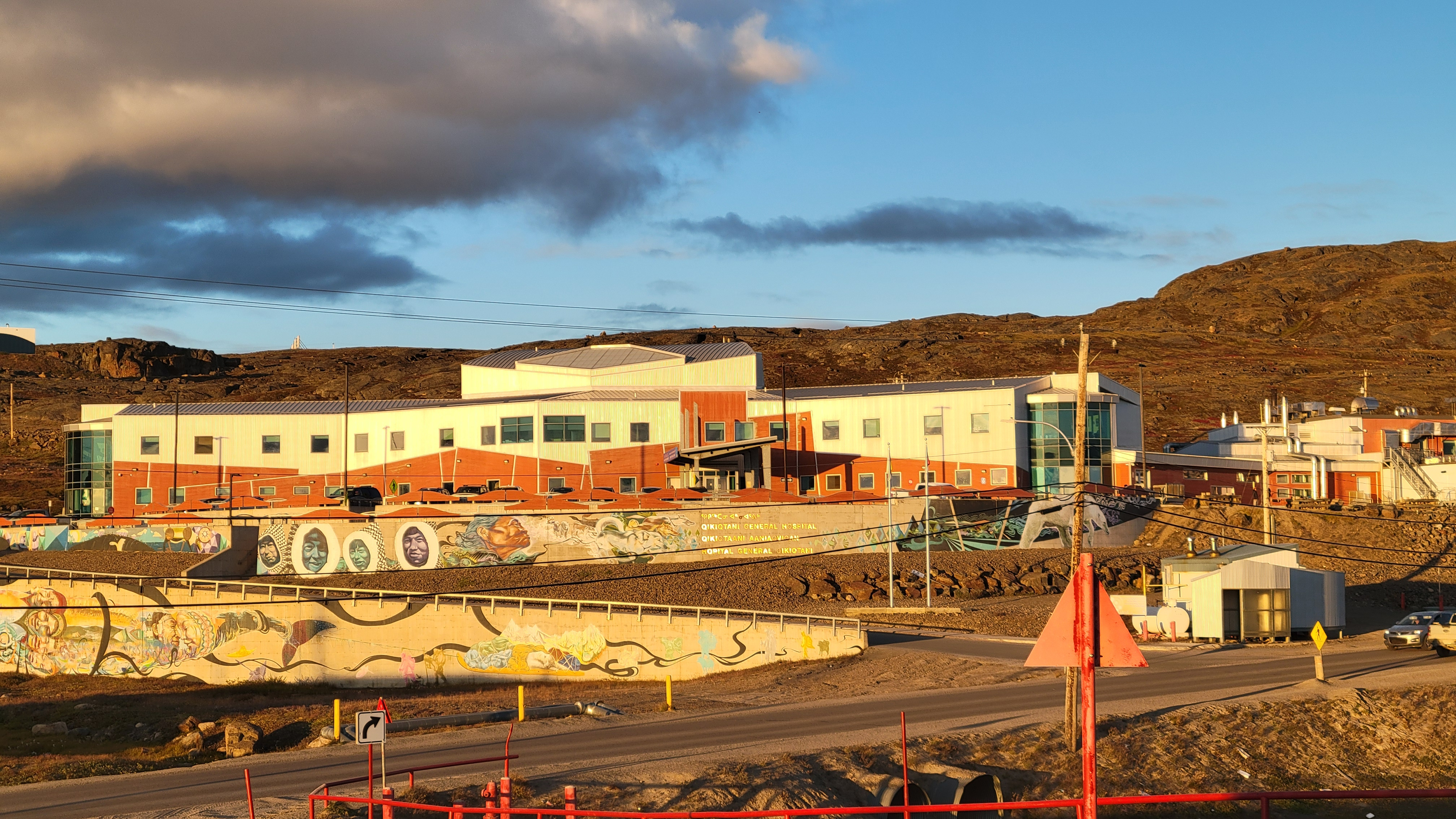

Services
- Emergency department: Yes
- Beds: 35

History
- Former name: Baffin Regional Hospital
- Founded: 1962

Links
- Website: Qikiqtani General Hospital

Qikiqtani General Hospital (QGH) is a 35-bed acute care hospital in the Nunavut territorial capital of Iqaluit on Baffin Island. It is also the sole hospital in the territory. The first hospital, the Baffin Regional Hospital, was constructed in 1962, and a new hospital, the Qikiqtani General Hospital replaced the older one in 2007. By 2013, it had four birthing rooms, and two operating rooms.

The hospital underwent major renovations that were completed in 2016. The QGH East Wing, now houses out-patient services, a "rapid access walk-in clinic, specialty clinics, oral health", as well as administrative support staff, was officially opened in 2017 by Nunavut's Minister of Health, George Hickes. Hickes said that the hospital is a "focal point in the community", and that the "newly renovated East Wing of the original Baffin Regional Hospital in Iqaluit compliments [sic] the newer Qikiqtani General Hospital with modern infrastructure and space".

With all services under one roof, including the ER and public health, the usual spring increase in cases was manageable in 2018. QGH waiting times are "actually quite low" compared to other areas in Canada, where some patients wait up to 20 hours.

== Services ==
The regional hospital offers services in cardiology, gynaecology, dermatology, rheumatology, neurology, internal medicine, respirology, urology, orthopaedics, paediatric cardiology, allergist, ENT (Ears, nose and throat specialist), and ophthalmology.
