= Timmianut Pikiuqarvik =

Disc golf course in Nunavut, Canada

Coordinates: 63°44′48″N 68°32′40″W

- Location within Canada Location within Nunavut

Course information
- Elevation: 22 metres (72 ft)

Main
- Holes: 18
- Par: 54
- Length: 1,000 metres (3,300 ft)

Timmianut Pikiuqarvik (Inuktitut: ᑎᒻᒥᐊᓄᑦ ᐱᑭᐅᖃᕐᕕᒃ, "where birds nest") is an 18-hole disc golf course in Iqaluit, Nunavut, Canada, located South of Iqaluit Airport, between Sylvia Grinnell Territorial Park and Frobisher Bay. Since its establishment in 2007, it is the only disc golf course in Nunavut and the third course in the Canadian Territories. The course is notable for being completely devoid of trees, since it is one of only a handful disc golf courses located North of the tree line. This course used to be the most Northern course in Canada, however in 2021, Crocus Bluff Disc Golf Course was created in Dawson City, Yukon.

== Tourism ==
Because of its remoteness, the course is poorly known and rarely played, but often wish-listed by members of the disc golf community. In 2018 and 2019, Iqaluit's Timmianut Pikiuqarvik disc golf course received a brief mention in the Iqaluit Visitor's Guide as an amenity that can be enjoyed in the city.
