= Nakasuk =

Canadian Inuk guide and hunter

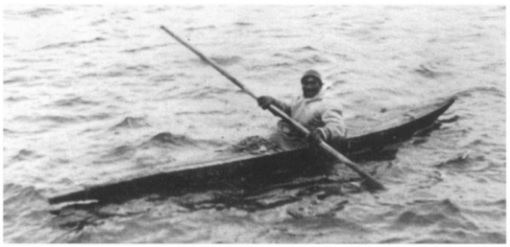
Nakasuk in 1943

Nakasuk (Inuktitut syllabics: ᓇᑲᓱᒃ [nakasuk]) was an Inuk who was born at a sealing camp near Pangnirtung, Northwest Territories (now Nunavut) in the early 20th century and grew up around Kimmirut (formerly Lake Harbour). He assisted a US Navy party wintering on Baffin Island during the 1941–1942 winter to find a suitable location for a US air base.

The site they selected is the location of the modern community of Iqaluit. Nakasuk remained at the site to assist the Americans in establishing their base, and settled there permanently after its completion, becoming Iqaluit's first permanent resident. He is therefore remembered as the founder of Iqaluit, and Nakasuk Elementary School is named in his honour.

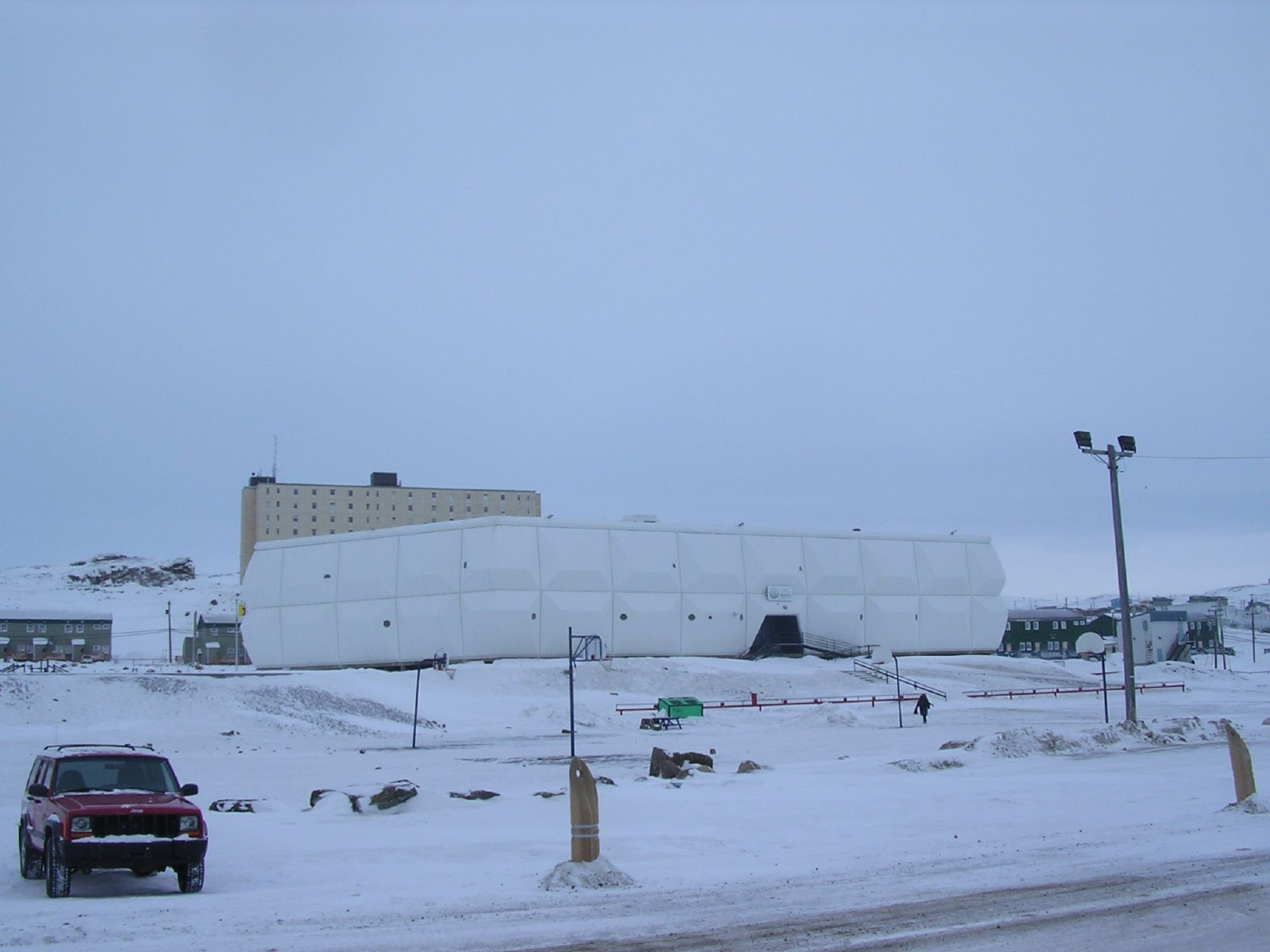
Nakasuk Elementary School

His name means "bladder" in Inuktitut.
