= Inuksuk High School =

Location
- Box 487; Iqaluit, Nunavut, X0A 0H0; Canada; 63°44′57″N 68°30′50″W

Information
- School type: Public Secondary School
- Established: 1971; 55 years ago
- School board: Qikiqtani School Operations
- Superintendent: Trudy Pettigrew (Executive Director)
- Principal: Tim Hoyt
- Staff: 43
- Grades: 9–12
- Enrollment: 410
- Language: Inuktitut and English
- Colours: Blue and black
- Team name: Iqaluit Huskies

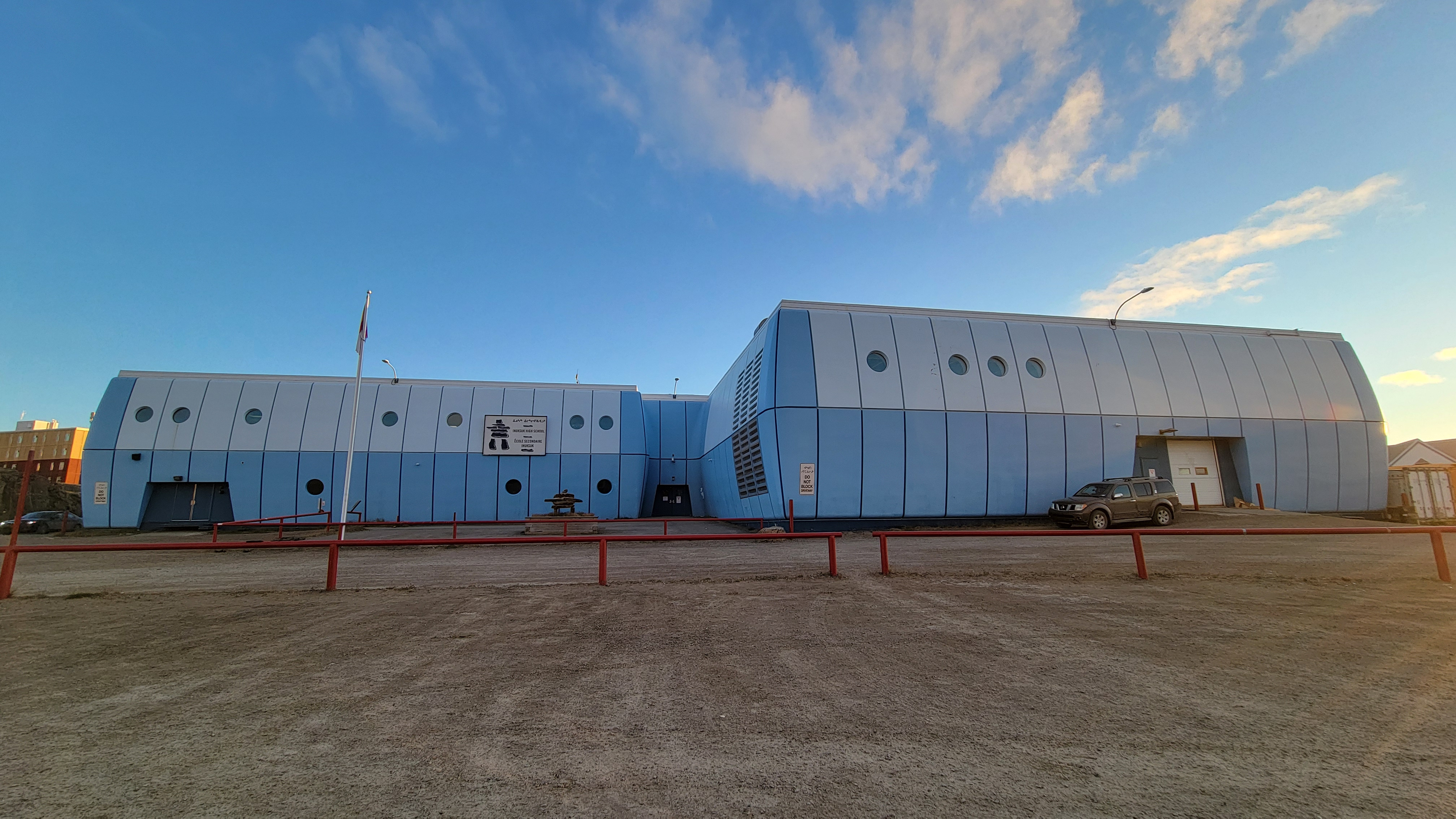
Inuksuk High School, Iqaluit, Nunavut

Inuksuk High School is the high school of Iqaluit, the capital of the Canadian territory of Nunavut.

== History ==
The school opened in late 1971 as the Gordon Robertson Educational Centre with 278 students and 28 teachers. Don King was the first principal. The school was built by two companies, Maurice Carrier Inc. and Wilfrid Legars Inc., both of Sainte-Foy, Quebec, at a cost of $3.3 million. Canadian Industries Limited built the school's exterior walls from prefabricated glass-fiber reinforced plastic, a light-weight material that would reduce shipping costs. The panels were designed to withstand winds of 100 miles per hour (161 km/h), which sometimes occur in the area. Exterior windows were made of three layers of glass, similar to the type used on airplanes, in order to provide thermal insulation.

Before the school was built, students were sent to Churchill, Manitoba, for high school.
