= Qaummaarviit Territorial Park =

Territorial park in Nunavut, Canada

Coordinates: 63°42′54″N 068°29′55″W

Qaummaarviit Territorial Park ("place that shines") is located 12 km (7.5 mi) west of Iqaluit in the Qikiqtaaluk Region of Nunavut, Canada. Situated on a small island near Peterhead Inlet, it is thought that the island was inhabited by the Thule people in the early part of the 13th century.

== History ==
The area was one of great wildlife diversity which may have attracted the normally marine mammal hunting Thule. The island, which is only one quarter square kilometre in size, would have helped them ensure a more stable lifestyle with access to alternate food sources. Although it is estimated that population did not exceed 25 people on the island at a time, more than 3,000 tools and 20,000 bones have been found. Although there are few remains today the large number of seal and whale bones suggest that the inhabitants used umiaks and qajaq. Bones of caribous, walruses, various birds, foxes, wolves and dogs were found as well. The island was inhabited until approximately the end of the 18th century. In 1860 when Charles Francis Hall visited the area his Inuit guides were able to harvest a large amount of food from there. Qaummaarviit was declared a historic park by the Government of the Northwest Territories in 1985.

== Sights ==
The area shows evidence of at least 11 sod houses and there are stone rings and tent remains, which indicates that the island was used both in summer and winter. In some cases even the floors of human dwellings are well preserved. A stone box for storing food, meat caches and a stone trap for catching animals like foxes and wolves can be seen as well.

== Getting there ==
The island is accessible from Iqaluit by boat in the summer and by snowmobile, dog sled or skis in the winter. Due to the historic nature of the park camping is not permitted.

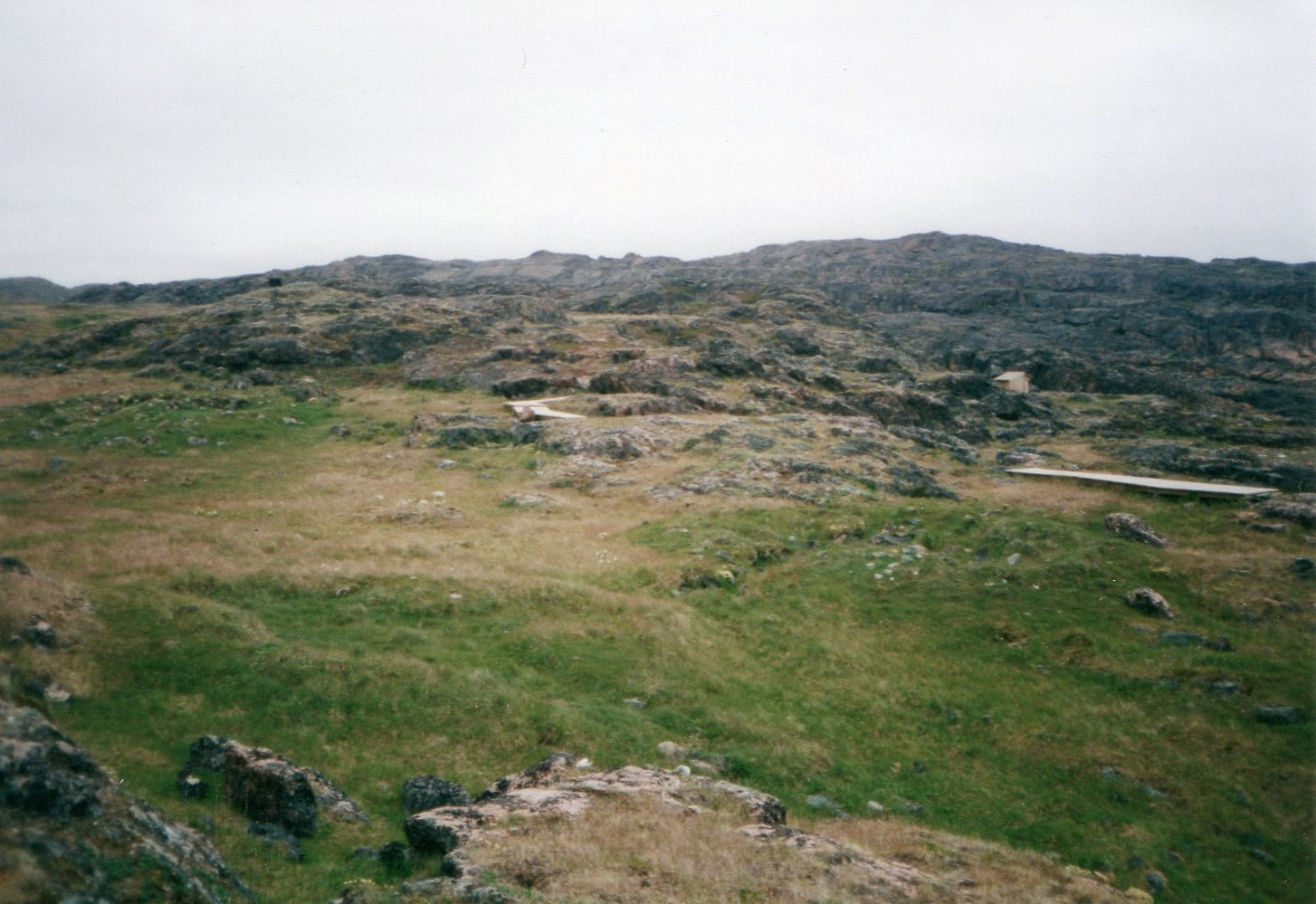
General view of Qaummaarviit Park

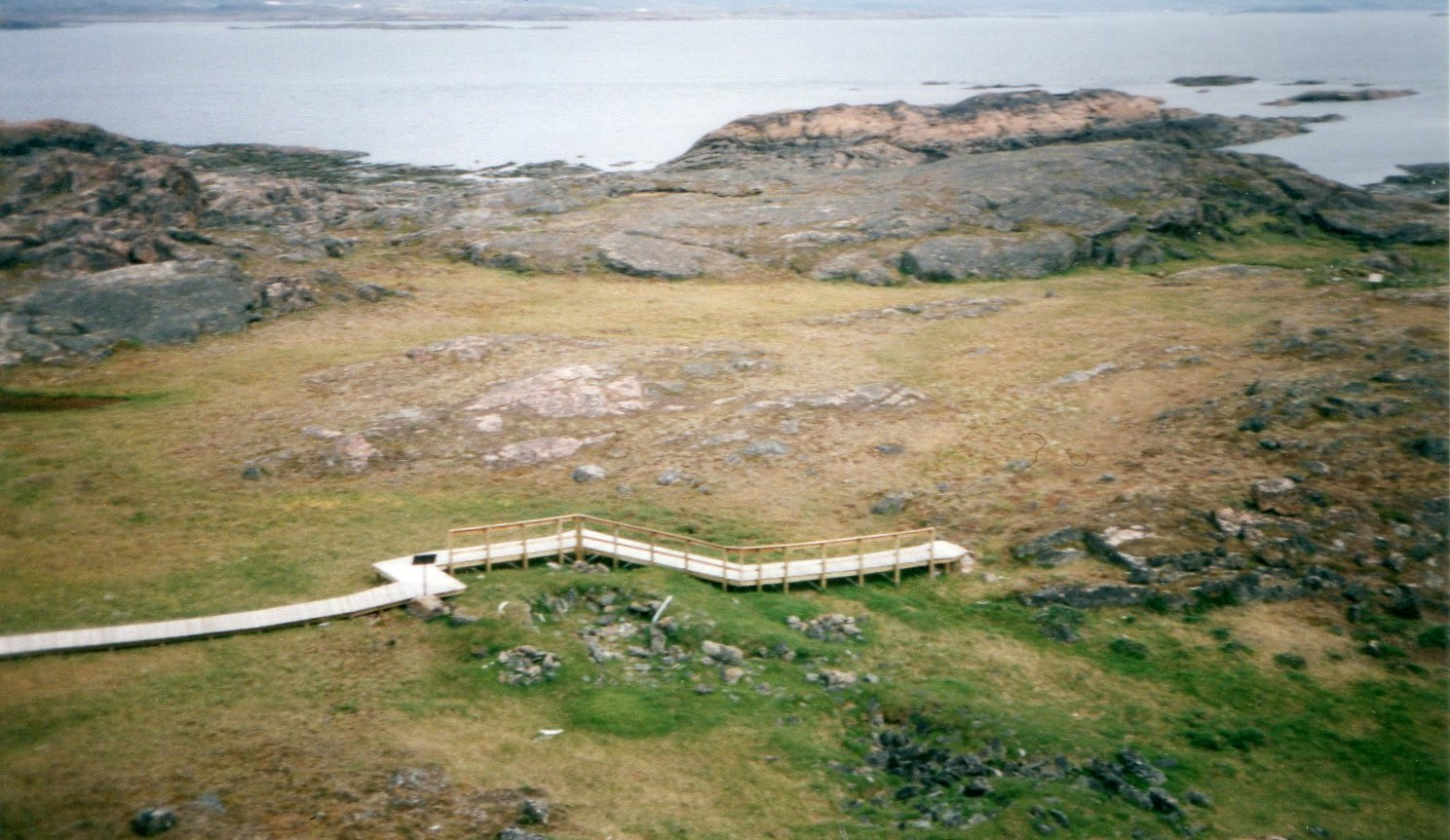
General view of Qaummaarviit Park

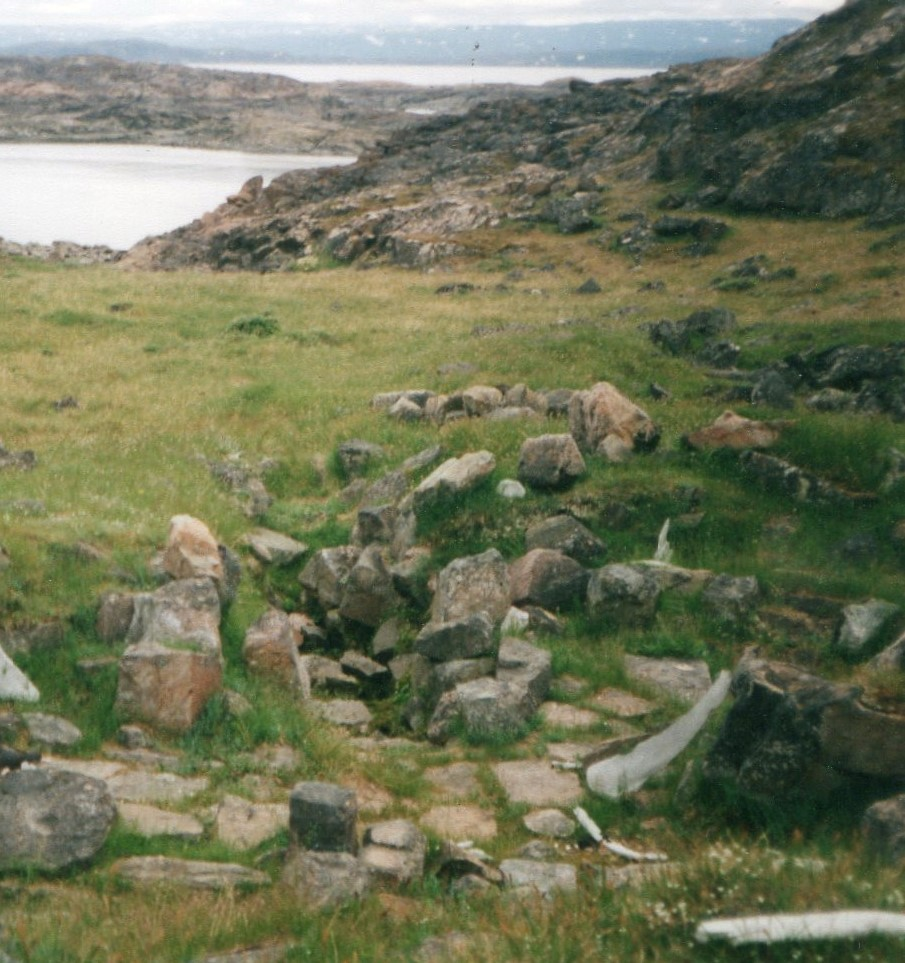
Floor and foundation of human dwelling

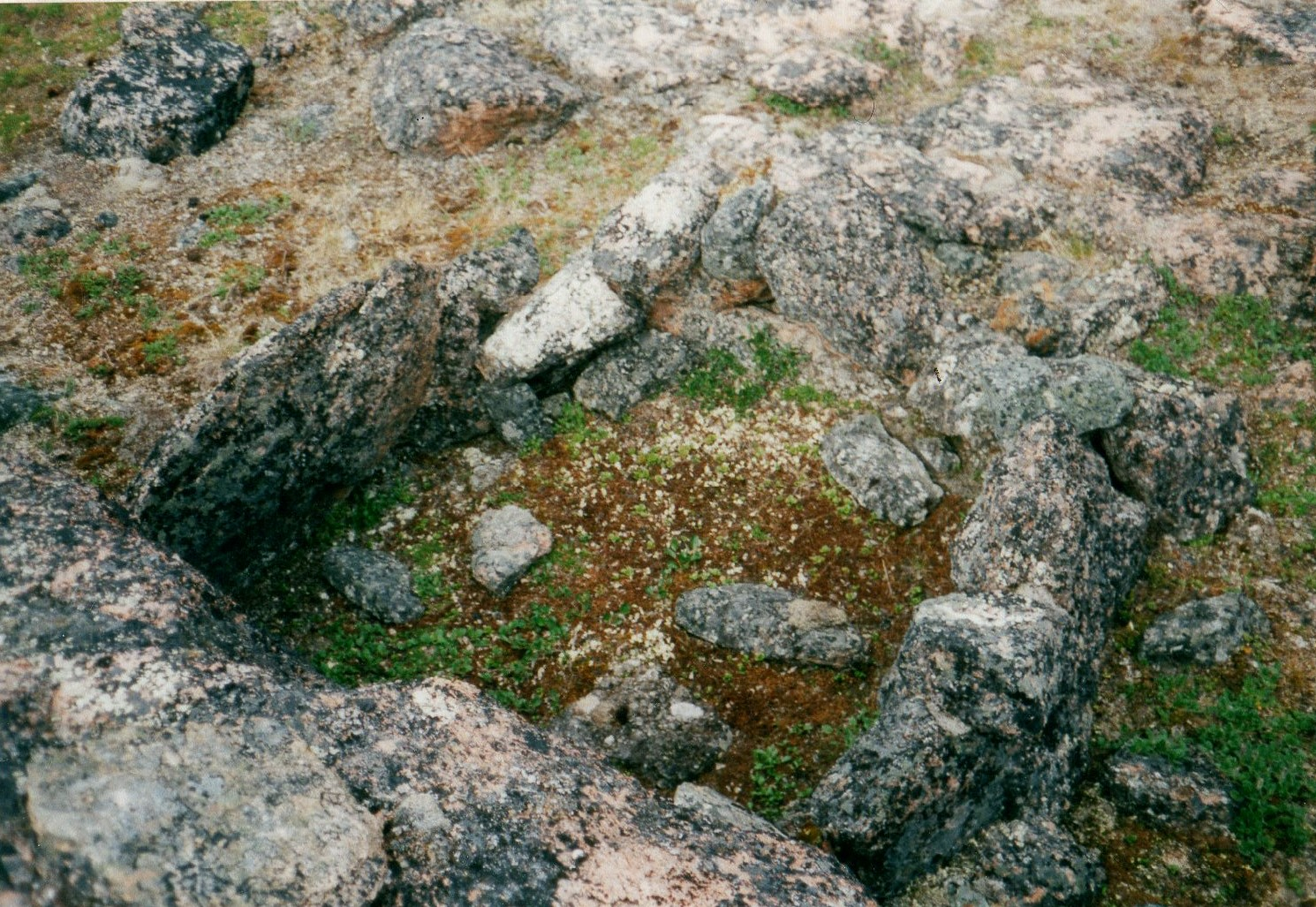
Stone box for storing food

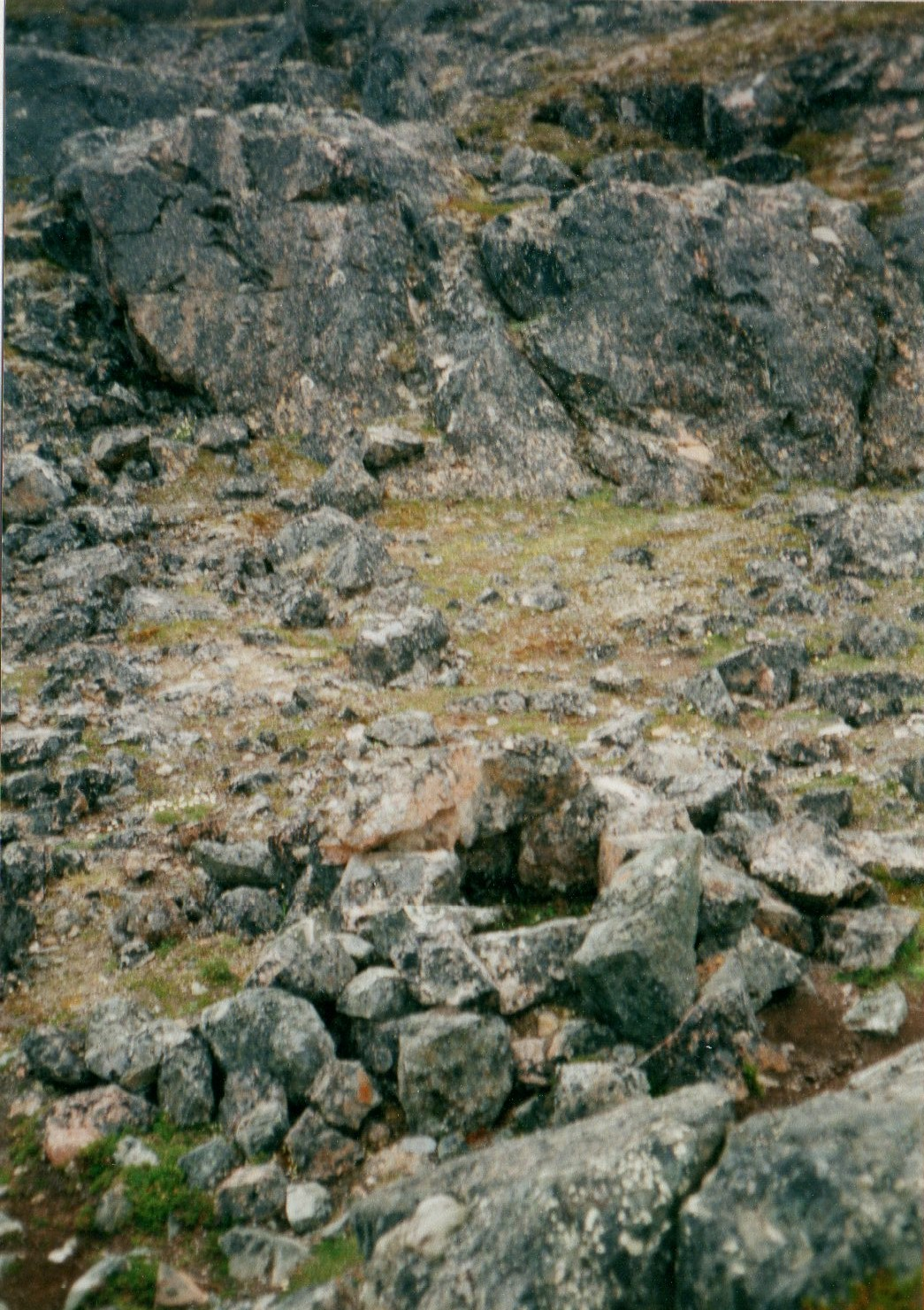
Stone trap
