= Katannilik Territorial Park =

Territorial park in Nunavut, Canada

Coordinates: 62°54′N 69°51′W

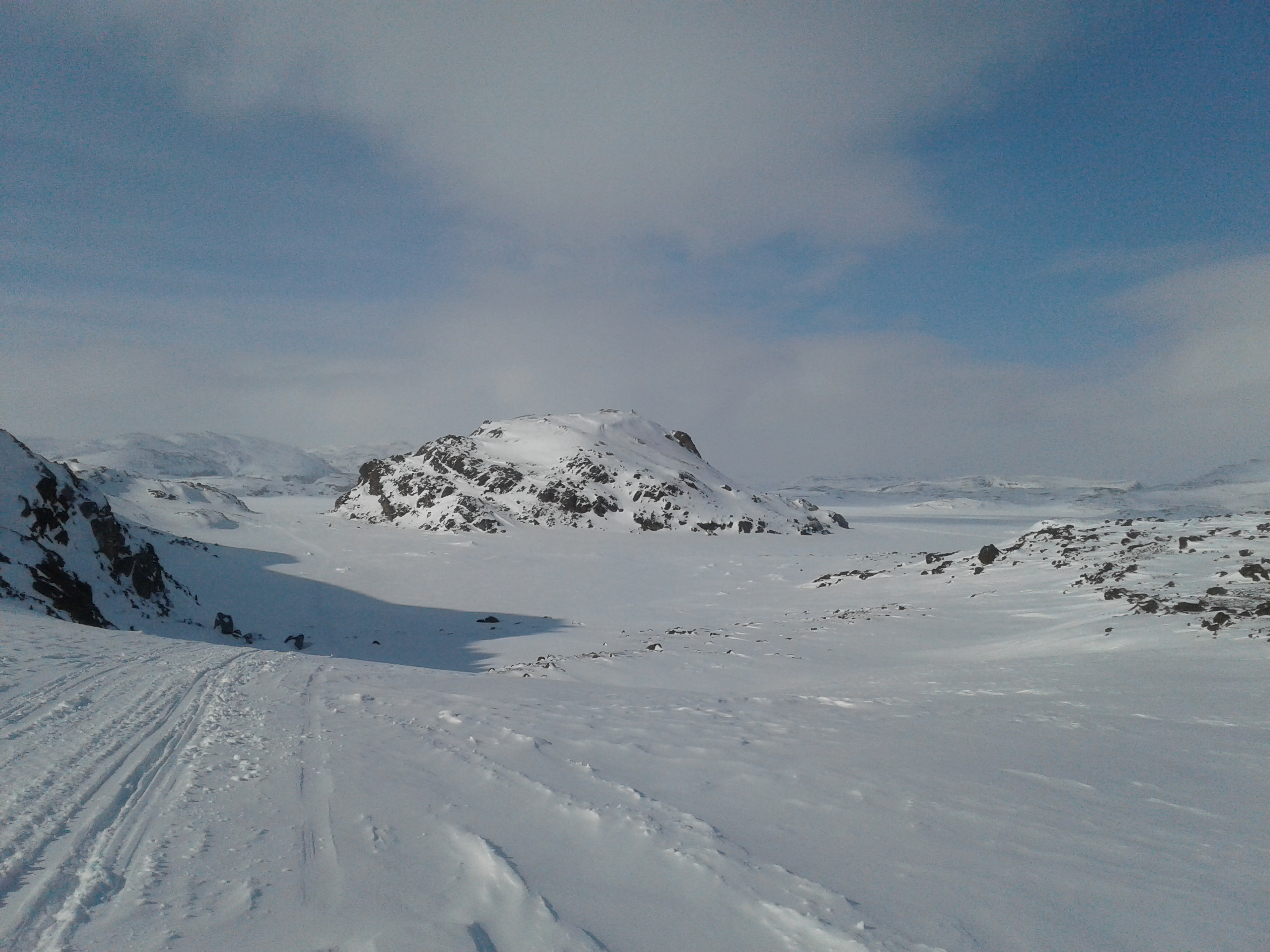

Katannilik Territorial Park ("the place of waterfalls") is a territorial park in the Qikiqtaaluk Region of Nunavut, Canada. It was established in 1993 and has an area of 1,262 km^{2} (487 sq mi). The Soper River, part of the Canadian Heritage Rivers System, flows through the park.
