= The Amazing Race Canada 1 =

Season of television series

- Season 1
- Presented by: Jon Montgomery
- No. of teams: 9
- Winners: Tim Hague, Sr. & Tim Hague, Jr.
- No. of legs: 10
- Distance traveled: 23,000 km (14,000 mi)
- No. of episodes: 10 (11 including reunion)

Release
- Original network: CTV
- Original release: July 15 – September 16, 2013

Additional information
- Filming dates: May 3 – May 24, 2013

Series chronology
- Next → Season 2

The Amazing Race Canada 1 is the first season of The Amazing Race Canada, a Canadian reality competition show based on the American series The Amazing Race. Hosted by Jon Montgomery, it featured nine teams of two, each with a pre-existing relationship, in a race across Canada. The grand prize included a CA$250,000 cash payout, two Chevrolet Corvette Stingrays, and unlimited air travel for a year with Air Canada. This season visited seven provinces and three territories and travelled over 23,000 kilometres (14,000 mi) during ten legs. Starting in Niagara Falls, Ontario, racers travelled through Ontario, British Columbia, Alberta, the Northwest Territories, the Yukon, Saskatchewan, Quebec, Nunavut, Nova Scotia, and Newfoundland and Labrador before finishing in Toronto. The series premiered on CTV on July 15, 2013, on CTV and concluded on September 16, 2013.

Father and son Timothy Hague Sr. and Timothy Hague Jr. were the winners of this season, while brothers Jody and Cory Mitic finished in second place, and sisters Vanessa Morgan and Celina Mziray finished in third place.

== Production ==
=== Development and filming ===
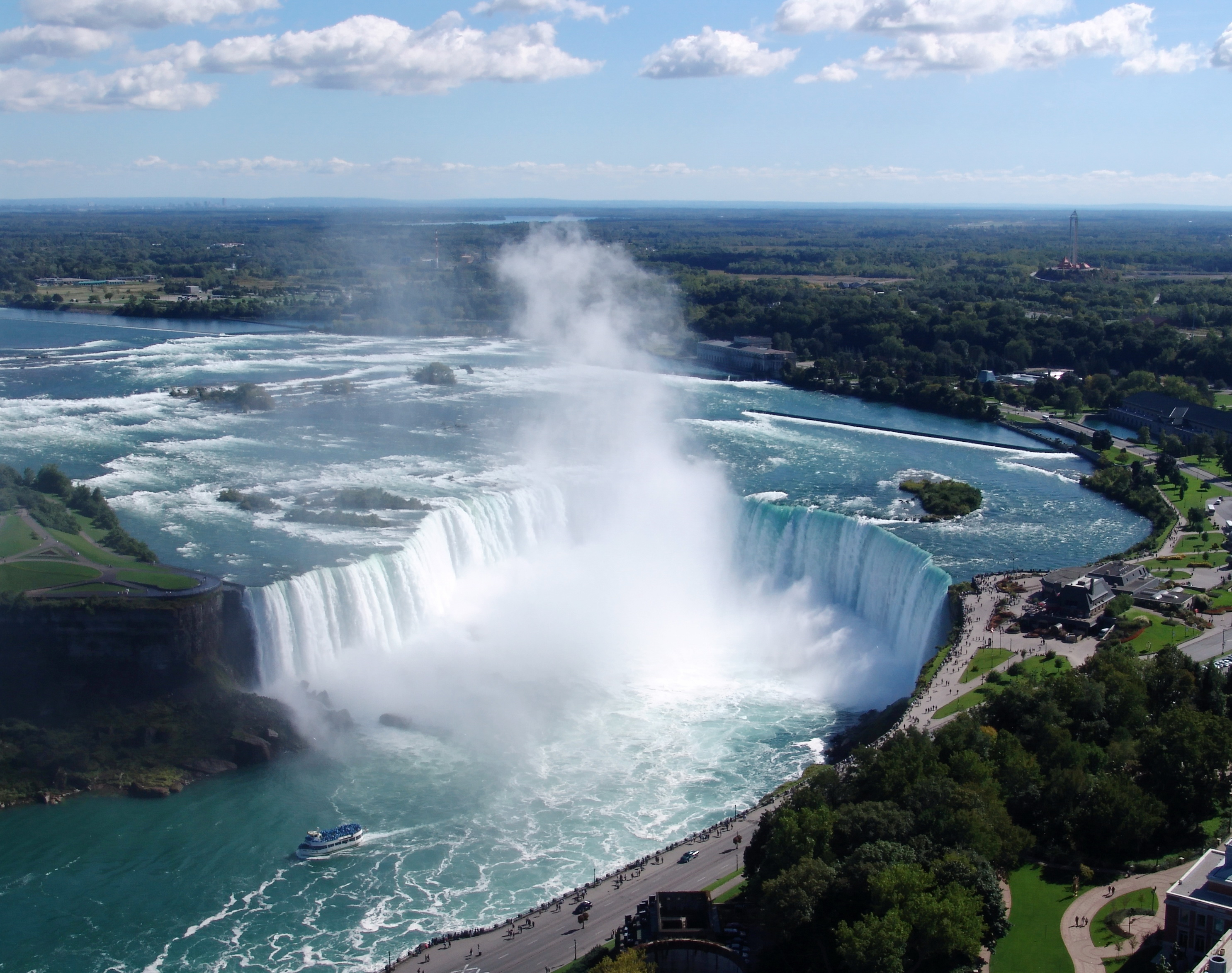
Oakes Garden Theatre, overlooking the famous Horseshoe Falls section of Niagara Falls, served as the Starting Line for the first season of The Amazing Race Canada.

The first season was filmed from May 3 to May 24, 2013.

The winning team earned CAD$250,000, a pair of Chevrolet Corvette Stingrays, and Air Canada executive passes for unlimited international air travel for a year.

During the airing of the third episode, a message read by host Jon Montgomery recognized that the 2013 Alberta floods had occurred since the filming of the leg and prior to the series premiere. The message encouraged viewers to donate to flood relief and rebuilding efforts.

The fifth leg's Pit Stop was originally scheduled to be on the grounds of the Saskatchewan Legislative Building; however, unexpected warm weather brought more people out to enjoy the day outdoors. This unforeseen circumstance forced producers to move the Pit Stop to nearby Pine Island (a more secluded spot).

On May 8, 2013, Toronto City Council granted permission for Insight Productions to film a television episode for "3 participants rappelling over the West Tower roof onto the podium green roof of City Hall" on May 24, 2013. Ultimately, this permit was a ruse to prevent fans from recording teams rappelling off a different building and posting it online.

=== Casting ===
Casting began on December 20, 2012, with an online site for submission of applications and audition videos.

=== Marketing ===
The series' premiere sponsorship partners included Air Canada, BlackBerry, Chevrolet, and Interac.

== Cast ==
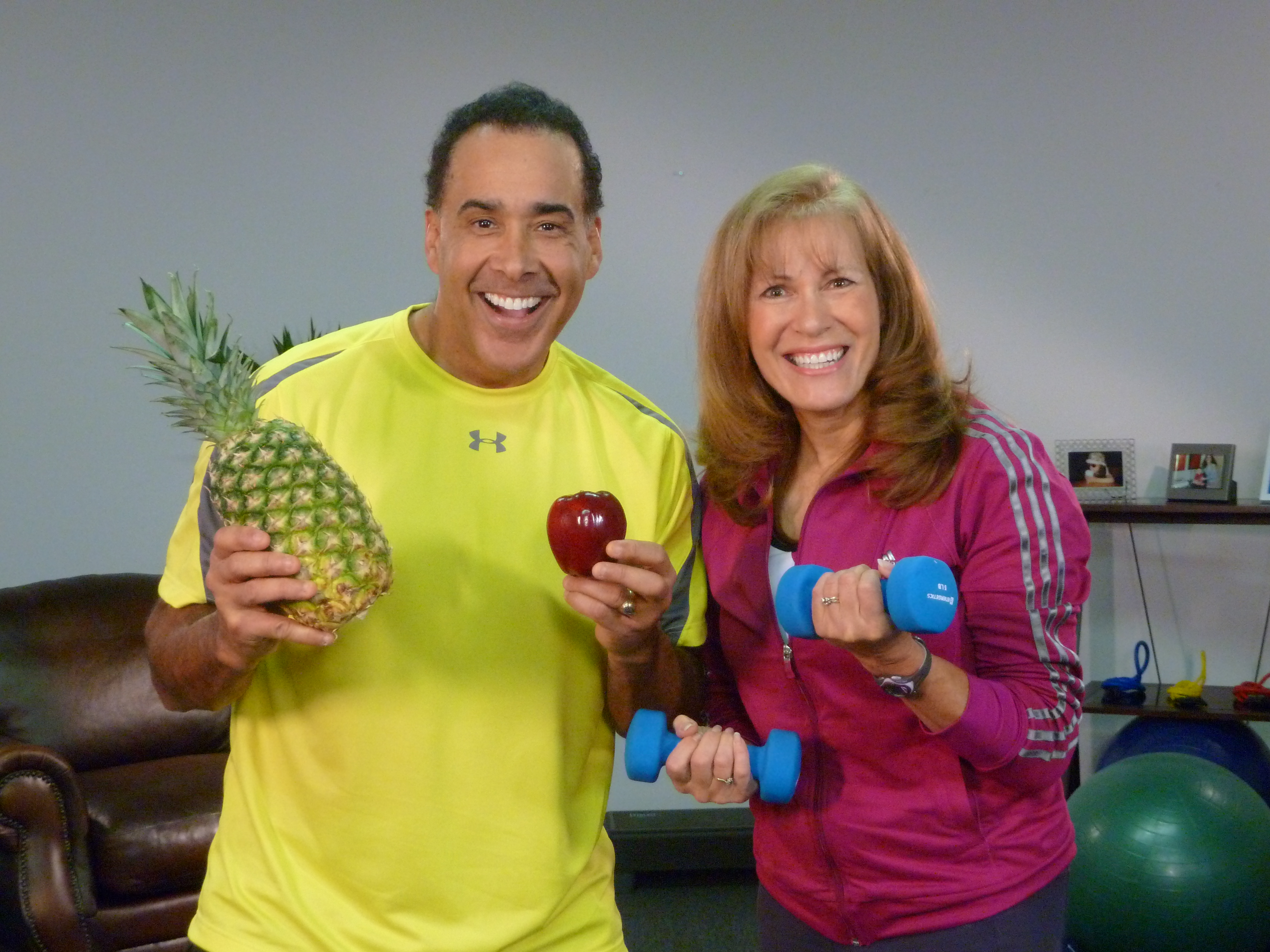
Hal Johnson and Joanne McLeod

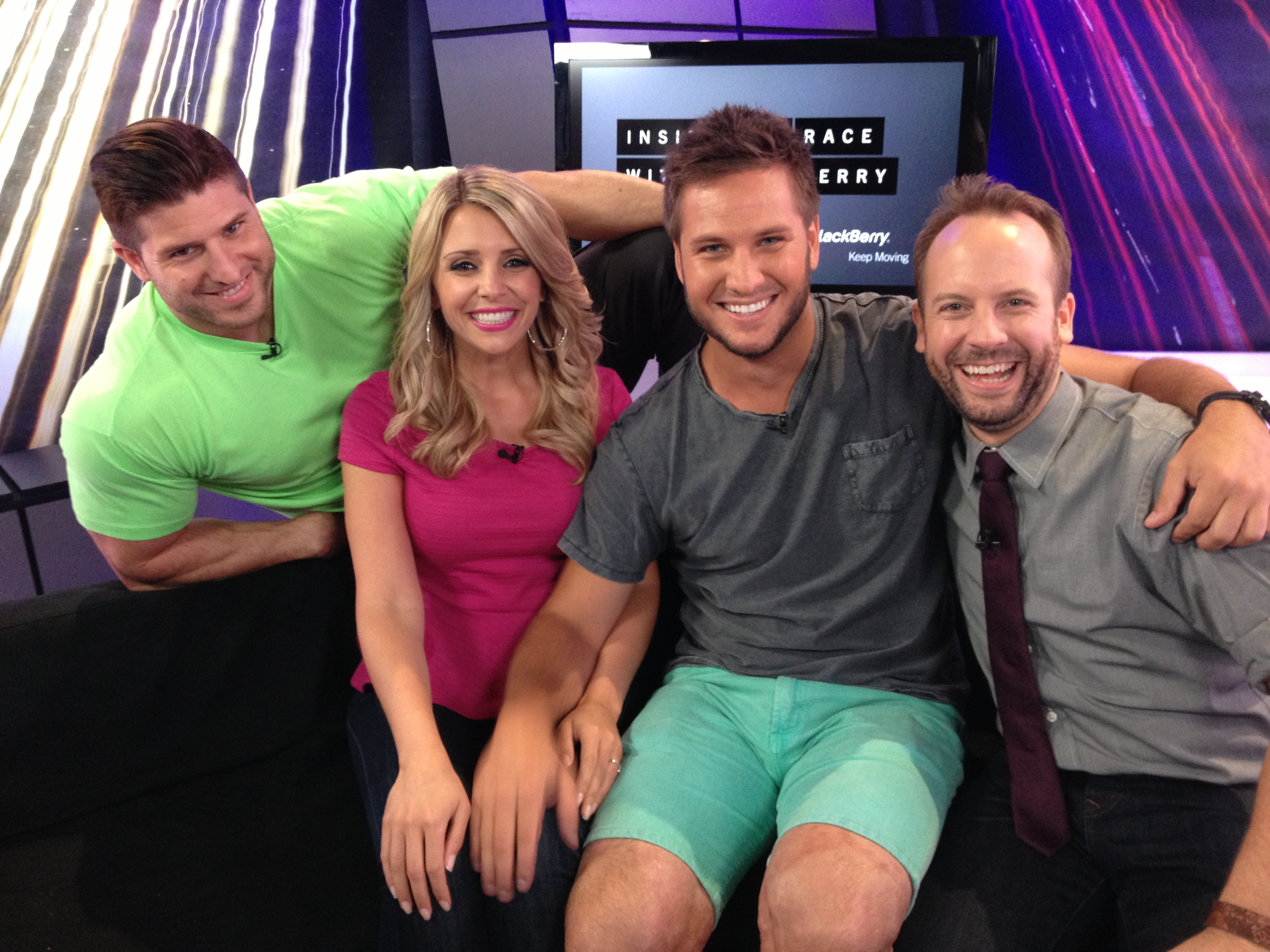
Jet Black (left) and Dave Schram (second from the right)

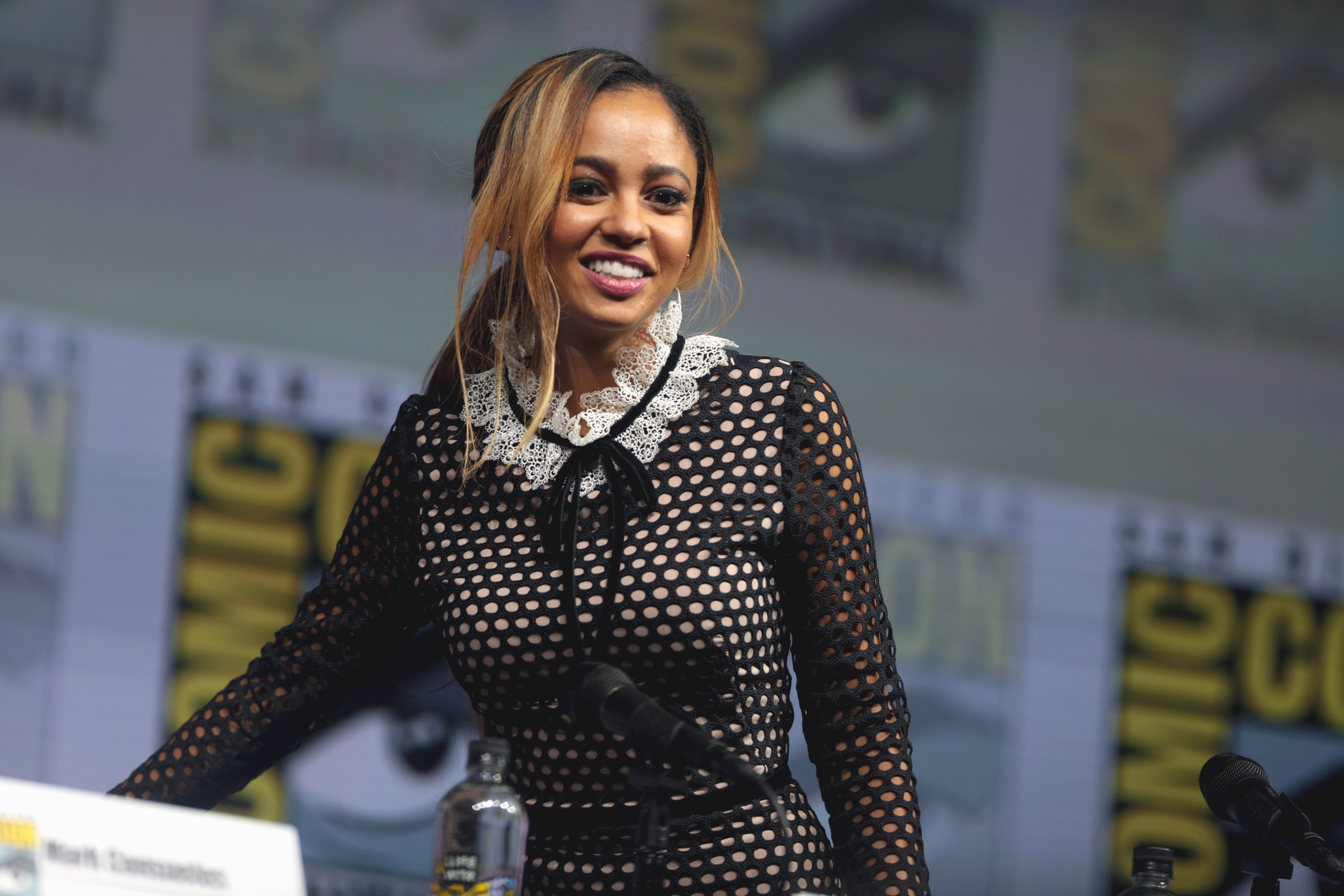
Vanessa Morgan

Notable contestants included Body Break hosts Hal Johnson and Joanne McLeod, amputee veteran Jody Mitic, and actress Vanessa Morgan.

Contestants	Age	Relationship	Hometown	Status
Treena Ley	36	Twin Sisters	Hamilton, Ontario	Eliminated 1st (in Westbank, British Columbia)
Tennille Dorrington	36	Twin Sisters	Hamilton, Ontario	Eliminated 1st (in Westbank, British Columbia)
Jamie Cumberland	47	Best Friends	Airdrie, Alberta	Eliminated 2rd (in Vancouver, British Columbia)
Pierre Cadieux	38	Best Friends	Innisfail, Alberta	Eliminated 2rd (in Vancouver, British Columbia)
Kristen Idiens	32	Dating	Fairmont Hot Springs, British Columbia	Eliminated 3rd (in Carcross, Yukon)
Darren Trapp	26	Dating	Fairmont Hot Springs, British Columbia	Eliminated 3rd (in Carcross, Yukon)
Hal Johnson	57	Married Fitness Icons	Oakville, Ontario	Eliminated 4th (in Regina, Saskatchewan)
Joanne McLeod	54	Married Fitness Icons	Oakville, Ontario	Eliminated 4th (in Regina, Saskatchewan)
Holly Agostino	33	Married Doctors	Montreal, Quebec	Eliminated 5th (in Iqaluit, Nunavut)
Brett Burstein	32	Married Doctors	Montreal, Quebec	Eliminated 5th (in Iqaluit, Nunavut)
Jet Black	32	Best Friends	London, Ontario	Eliminated 6th (in St. John's, Newfoundland and Labrador)
Dave Schram	28	Best Friends	London, Ontario	Eliminated 6th (in St. John's, Newfoundland and Labrador)
Vanessa Morgan	21	Sisters	Ottawa, Ontario	Third Place
Celina Mziray	30	Sisters	Ottawa, Ontario	Third Place
Jody Mitic	36	Brothers	Ottawa, Ontario	Second Place
Cory Mitic	32	Brothers	Edmonton, Alberta	Second Place
Tim Hague, Sr.	48	Father & Son	Winnipeg, Manitoba	Winners
Tim Hague, Jr.	23	Father & Son	Winnipeg, Manitoba	Winners

Future appearances

At the live start of season 7 on April 23, 2019, it was revealed that Jet & Dave would return to compete for a second time, as the winners of a public vote that closed on April 1.

Vanessa Morgan competed on the Paramount Network reality competition Lip Sync Battle in 2019.

== Results ==
The following teams are listed with their placements in each leg. Placements are listed in finishing order.

- A red placement with a dagger (†) indicates that the team was eliminated.
- An underlined blue placement with a double-dagger (‡) indicates that the team was the last to arrive at a Pit Stop in a non-elimination leg, and had to perform a Speed Bump task in the following leg.
- An italicized and underlined placement indicates that the team was the last to arrive at a Pit Stop, but there was no rest period at the Pit Stop and all teams were instructed to continue racing.
- A purple ε indicates that the team used an Express Pass on that leg to bypass one of their tasks.
- A brown ⊃ indicates that the team used the U-Turn and a brown ⊂ indicates the team on the receiving end of the U-Turn.

Team placement (by leg)
Team	1	2	3	4	5	6	7	8	9	10
Tim Sr. & Tim Jr.	6th (Note: Tim Sr. & Tim Jr. and Treena & Tennille initially arrived 5th and 8th respectively, but both teams were issued 30-minute penalties after they failed to get both clues for each of their team members at the Butterfly Conservatory. Tim Sr. & Tim Jr. dropped to 6th, while Treena & Tennille dropped to last.)	6th	7th‡	5th	2nd⊃ (Note: Tim Sr. & Tim Jr. chose to use the U-Turn on Hal & Joanne.)	5th‡	2nd	2nd	3rd	1st
Jody & Cory	7th	3rd	5th	6th	4th	2nd (Note: Holly & Brett and Jody & Cory tied for 2nd place after both teams stepped on the Pit Stop mat at the same time.)	1st	1st	1st	2nd
Vanessa & Celina	5th	5th	4th	4thε (Note: This team used their Express Pass to bypass one of the tasks on this leg.)	3rd	4th	4th	4th (Note: This team arrived last at the Pit Stop, but they were instructed to continue racing.)	2nd	3rd
Jet & Dave	4th	7th	3rd	1st	1st	1st	3rd	3rd	4th†	
Holly & Brett	2nd	1st	6th	2nd	5th⊂ (Note: Hal & Joanne chose to use the U-Turn on Holly & Brett.) (Note: Holly & Brett initially arrived 3rd, but were issued a 2-hour penalty for not completing the lentil bean task. Vanessa & Celina and Jody & Cory checked in during this penalty time, dropping Holly & Brett to 5th.)	2nd	5th†			
Hal & Joanne	3rd	2nd	1st	3rd	6th†^{⊂}_{⊃}					
Kristen & Darren	1st	4th	2nd	7th†						
Jamie & Pierre	8th	8th†								
Treena & Tennille	9th†									

== Race summary ==
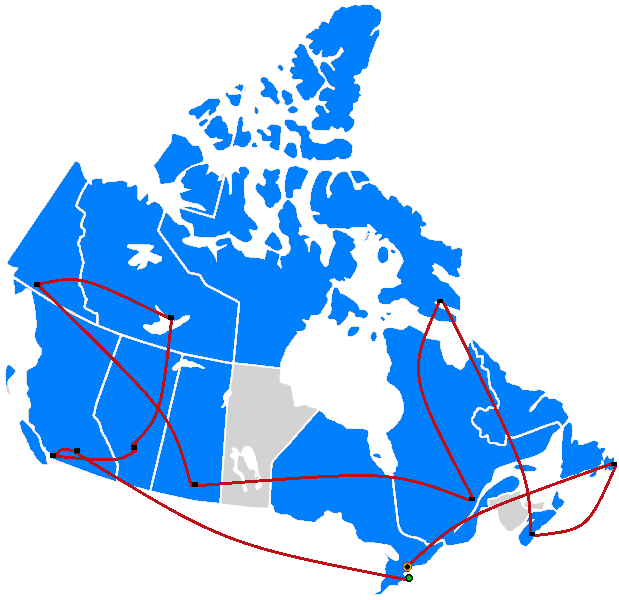
The complete route map of The Amazing Race Canada 1.

Destinations	Air travel Rail travel Water travel Bus travel Helicopter travel Bicycle travel Gondola travel
Route Markers	Detour Roadblock Fast Forward U-Turn Speed Bump Pit Stop

=== Leg 1 (Ontario → British Columbia) ===
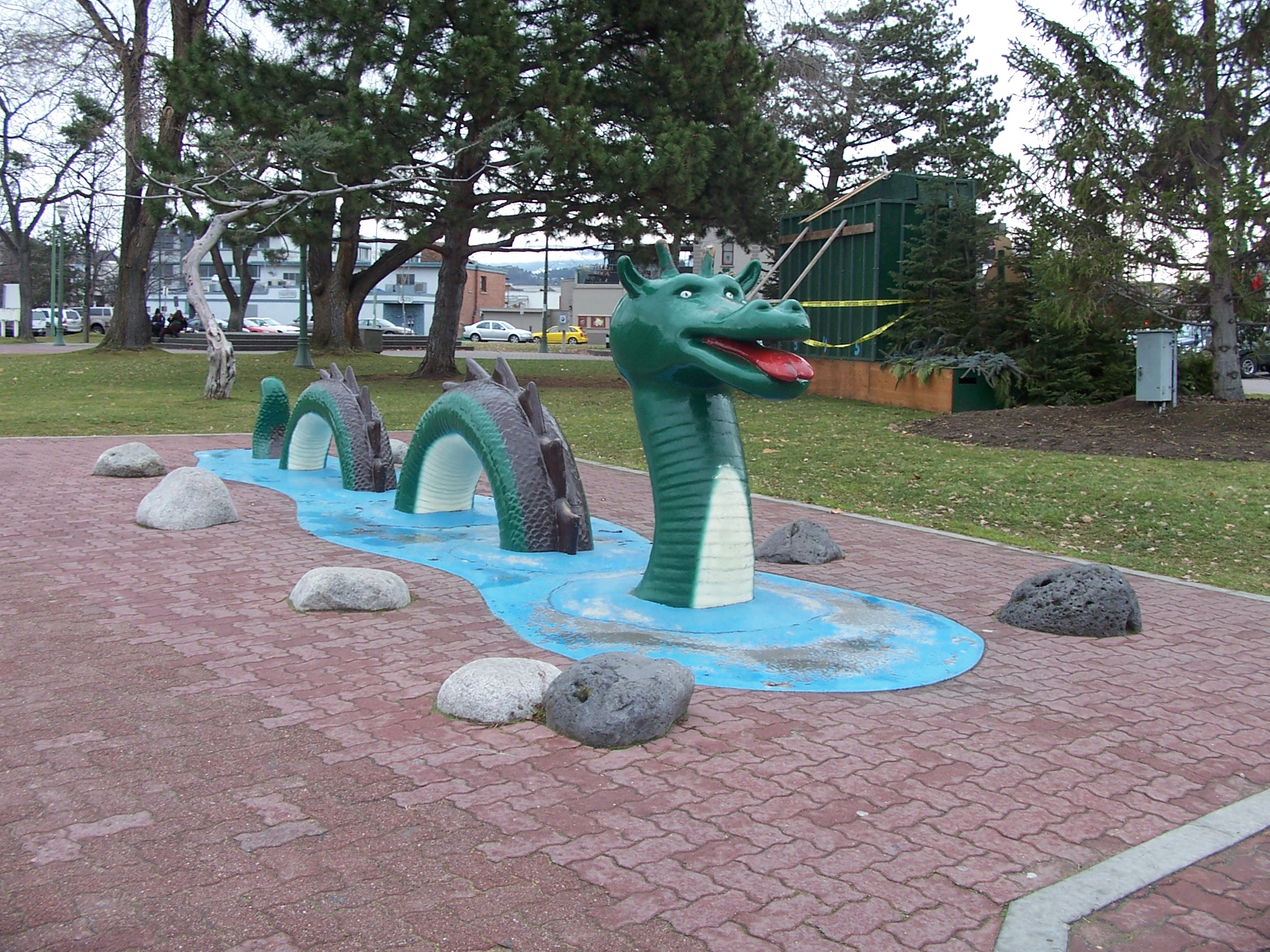
In the first Roadblock of The Amazing Race Canada, racers searched for the mythical Ogopogo in the depths of Kelowna's Lake Okanagan.

- Episode 1: "Where in the World is Ogopogo?" (July 15, 2013)
- Prizes: Two round trip plane tickets to Sydney, Australia, and two Express Passes (awarded to Kristen & Darren; one Express Pass for themselves and the other to be given to another team)
- Eliminated: Treena & Tennille

Locations

- Niagara Falls, Ontario (Oakes Garden Theatre) (Starting Line)
- Niagara Falls (Niagara Parks Butterfly Conservatory)
- Toronto (Toronto Pearson International Airport) → Kelowna, British Columbia (Kelowna International Airport)
- Kelowna (Stuart Park – The Kelowna Bear)
- Kelowna (Kelowna Yacht Club – Houseboat)
- Kelowna (Lakefront Watersports Kiosk)
- Okanagan Valley (Lake Okanagan)
- Myra-Bellevue Provincial Park (Bellevue Trestle)
- Westbank (Quails' Gate Winery)

Episode summary

- From Oakes Garden Theatre, teams were instructed to drive to the Niagara Parks Butterfly Conservatory to find their next clue. Then, teams had to search the conservatory for one of nine terraria, each containing a variety of creatures and two clues. Each team member had to reach into the terrarium and retrieve a clue, which contained plane ticket for their first destination: Kelowna, British Columbia. The terraria containing more dangerous creatures held tickets for the earlier flight. Four teams were on the first flight, while the remaining five teams on the second flight arrived 90 minutes later.
- At Stuart Park, teams had to find a model of the yellow Interac truck, where they would find their next clue along with an Interac debit card that would serve as the teams' source of money for the rest of the season. Teams then went to the Kelowna Yacht Club and had to choose a number to determine their departure for the next morning,
- In this series' first Roadblock, teams had to travel by personal watercraft to a diving platform using a rudimentary map of Lake Okanagan. There, one team member had to don diving gear, take a dive cage to the bottom of Lake Okanagan, and search for a statue of Ogopogo, where they would find their next clue.
- After the first Roadblock, teams had to drive to the Bellevue Trestle and find their next clue.
- In this leg's second Roadblock, the team member who did not perform the previous Roadblock had to walk across a narrow plank attached to a railway trestle suspended high above the canyon and retrieve their clue dangling off the edge of the plank. They then had to jump off the plank before reuniting with their partner.

Additional note

- Teams were instructed to drive to the Pit Stop, which they had to determine was the Quails' Gate Winery based on the wine bottle label included with their clue. This aspect of the clue was unaired in the episode.

=== Leg 2 (British Columbia) ===
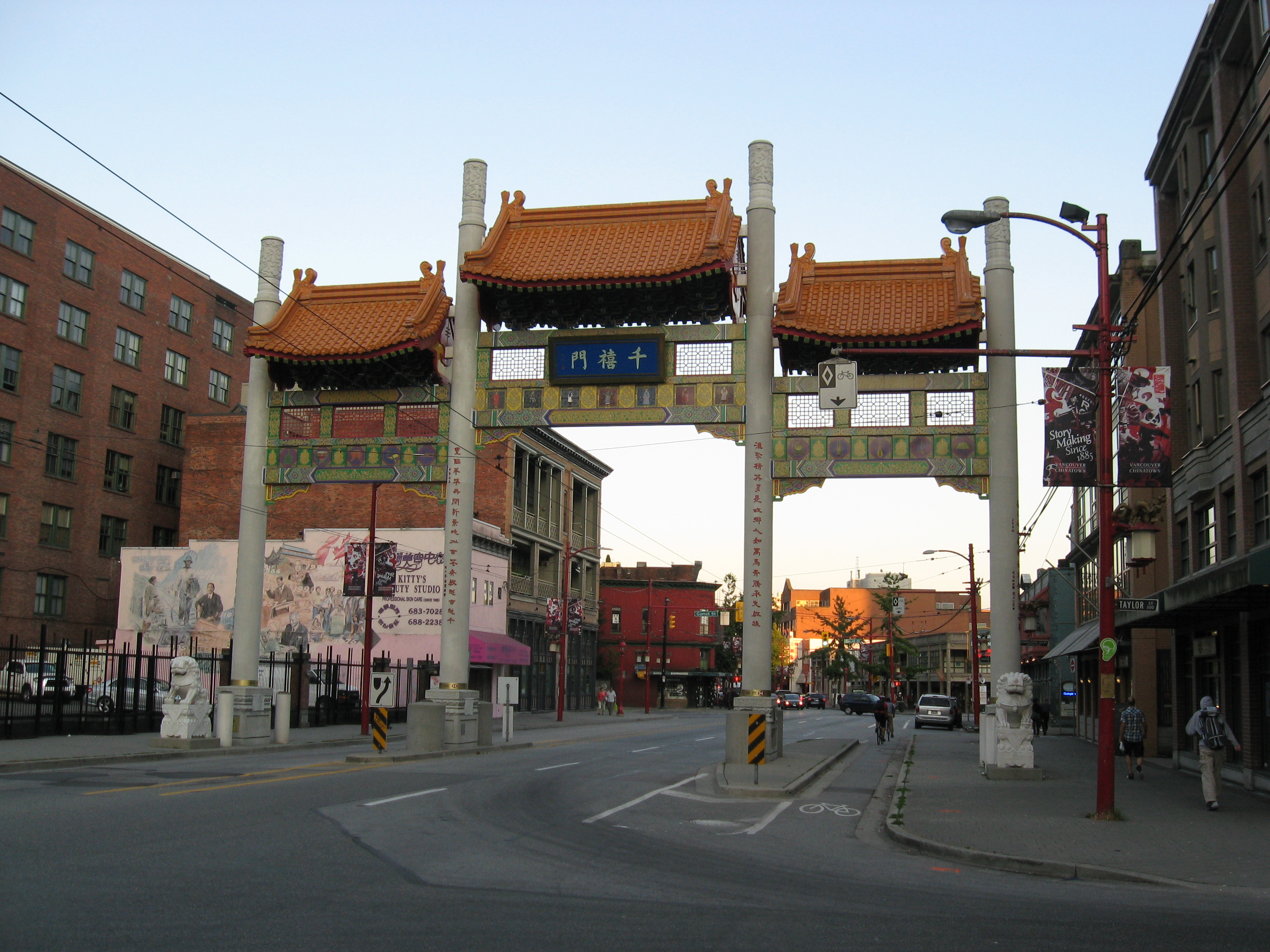
While in Vancouver, teams visited the Millennium Gate in Chinatown.

- Episode 2: "Se Hou Leng" (July 22, 2013)
- Prizes: Two round trip plane tickets to anywhere in Asia (awarded to Holly & Brett)
- Eliminated: Jamie & Pierre

Locations

- Kelowna (Waterfront Park)
- Kelowna (Kelowna International Airport) → Vancouver (Vancouver International Airport)
- Vancouver (Vancouver International Airport – Maple Leaf Lounge)
- Richmond (Richmond Olympic Oval)
- Vancouver (Chinatown – Millennium Gate)
- Vancouver (Ten Ren Tea & Ginseng Company & Dr. Sun Yat-Sen Classical Chinese Garden or Chinese Cultural Centre)
- Vancouver (DP World Container Terminal)
- Vancouver (Vancouver Convention Centre – Green Roof)

Episode summary

- At the start of this leg, teams were instructed to fly to Vancouver. Once there, teams found their next clue at the airport's Maple Leaf Lounge. Teams then had to travel to the Richmond Olympic Oval, which had their next clue.
- In this leg's Roadblock, one team member had to complete two laps of short track speed skating in under 90 seconds to receive their next clue from champion speed skater Michelle Pepin.
- After the Roadblock, teams found their next clue at the Millennium Gate.
- This series' first Detour was a choice between Draw It or Dance It. In Draw It, teams travelled to Ten Ren's Tea & Ginseng Company, where each team member had to drink a cup of green tea. Printed on the bottom of each saucer was a Chinese symbol representing one of the twelve animals of the Chinese zodiac. They had to memorize these characters, go to the Dr. Sun Yat-Sen Classical Chinese Garden, reproduce them with a calligraphy brush on rice paper, and give it to a calligraphy expert. If calligraphy expert was satisfied with both symbols, she gave teams their next clue; otherwise teams had to start all over again with new Chinese symbols. In Dance It, teams went to the Chinese Cultural Centre, where they received a list of destinations written entirely in Mandarin Chinese. They then had to travel to these locations in Chinatown to find four pieces of a Chinese lion costume. They then had to return to the Cultural Centre, where they had to perform a lion dance in costume to receive their next clue.
- After the Detour, teams had to climb to the top of a shipping crane at the DP World container terminal and use a pair of binoculars to search for flags marking the location of the Pit Stop: the green roof of the Vancouver Convention Centre.

=== Leg 3 (British Columbia → Alberta) ===
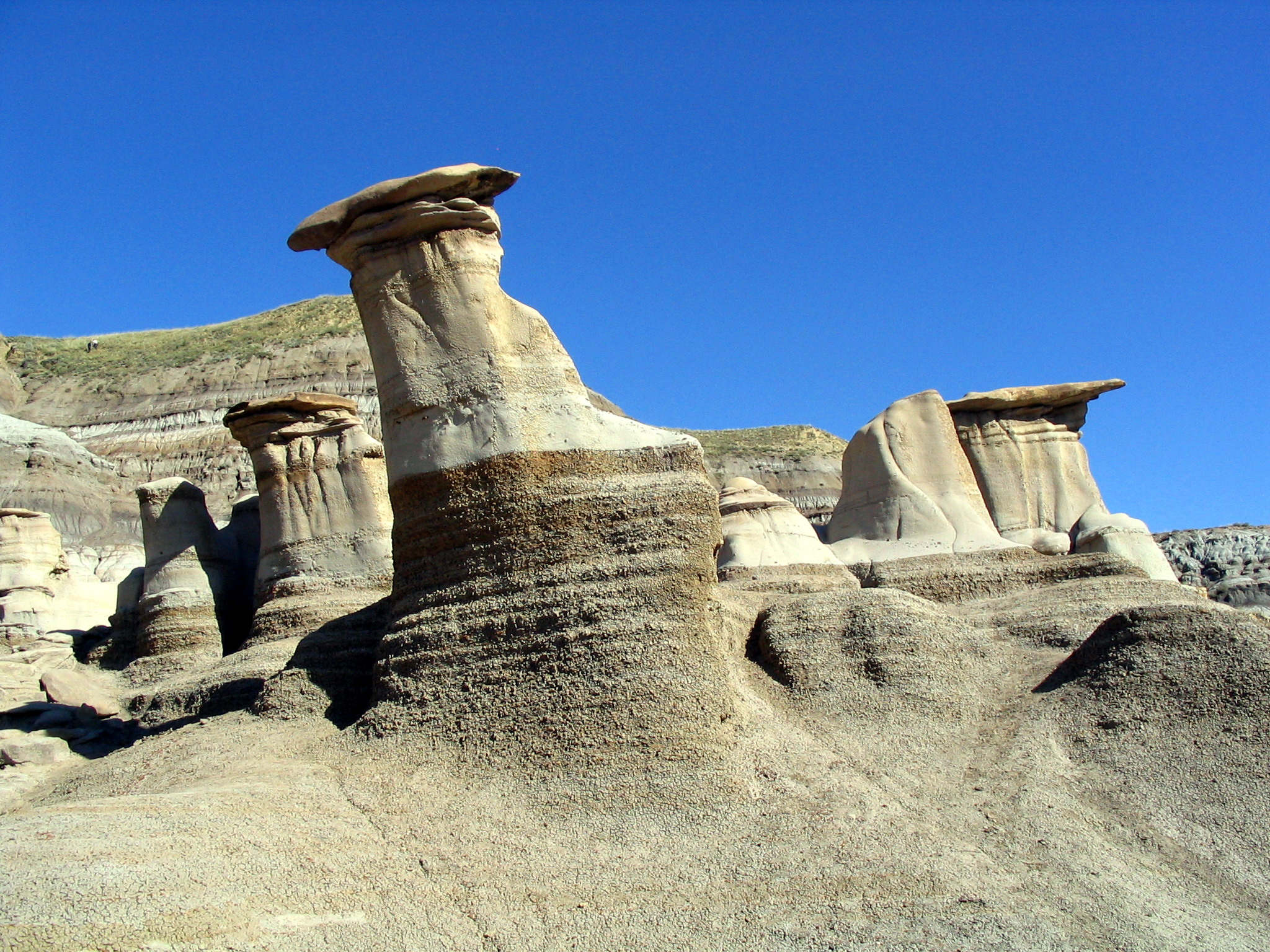
In leg 3, teams visited the hoodoos in the town of Drumheller.

- Episode 3: "Hoodoos and Hoodonts" (July 29, 2013)
- Prizes: Two round trip plane tickets to anywhere in the United States (awarded to Hal & Joanne)

Locations

- Vancouver (Vancouver Convention Centre)
- Vancouver (Nicola Internet Café)
- Vancouver (Vancouver International Airport) → Calgary, Alberta (Calgary International Airport)
- Calgary (Outlaw Statue)
- Calgary (Ranchman's Cookhouse)
- Drumheller (Hoodoos)
- East Coulee (Atlas Coal Mine) or Drumheller (Royal Tyrrell Museum)
- Starland County (Horsethief Canyon Outlook)

Episode summary

- At the Nicola Internet Café, teams had to book their flight to Calgary, Alberta. Once there, teams had to choose a marked vehicle and drive themselves to the statue of Outlaw (a well-known Calgary Stampede bull), where they found their next clue. Teams then had to drive to Ranchman's Cookhouse, which had their next clue.
- In this leg's Roadblock, one team member had to learn and then correctly perform a classic Canadian line danceto receive their next clue.
- After the Roadblock, teams had to drive to the hoodoos in Drumheller and find their next clue.
- This leg's Detour was a choice between Lump by Lump or Bone by Bone. In Lump by Lump, teams drove to the Atlas Coal Mine and rode a locomotive to the wash house, where they dressed in coal mining outfits. They then had to shovel coal into a mine cart so that it overflowed and touched all four edges of the cart, and then properly place their numbered tag on the cart to receive their next clue. In Bone by Bone, teams drove to the Royal Tyrrell Museum, where they memorized a mounted display of a dinosaur skeleton. They then had to enter the specimen preparation laboratory and completely build a model of the same skeleton to receive their next clue.
- After the Detour, teams had to check in at the Pit Stop: Horsethief Canyon Outlook in Starland County.

Additional notes

- During the flight to Calgary, Kristen & Darren gave their second Express Pass to Vanessa & Celina.
- This was a non-elimination leg.

=== Leg 4 (Alberta → Northwest Territories → Yukon) ===
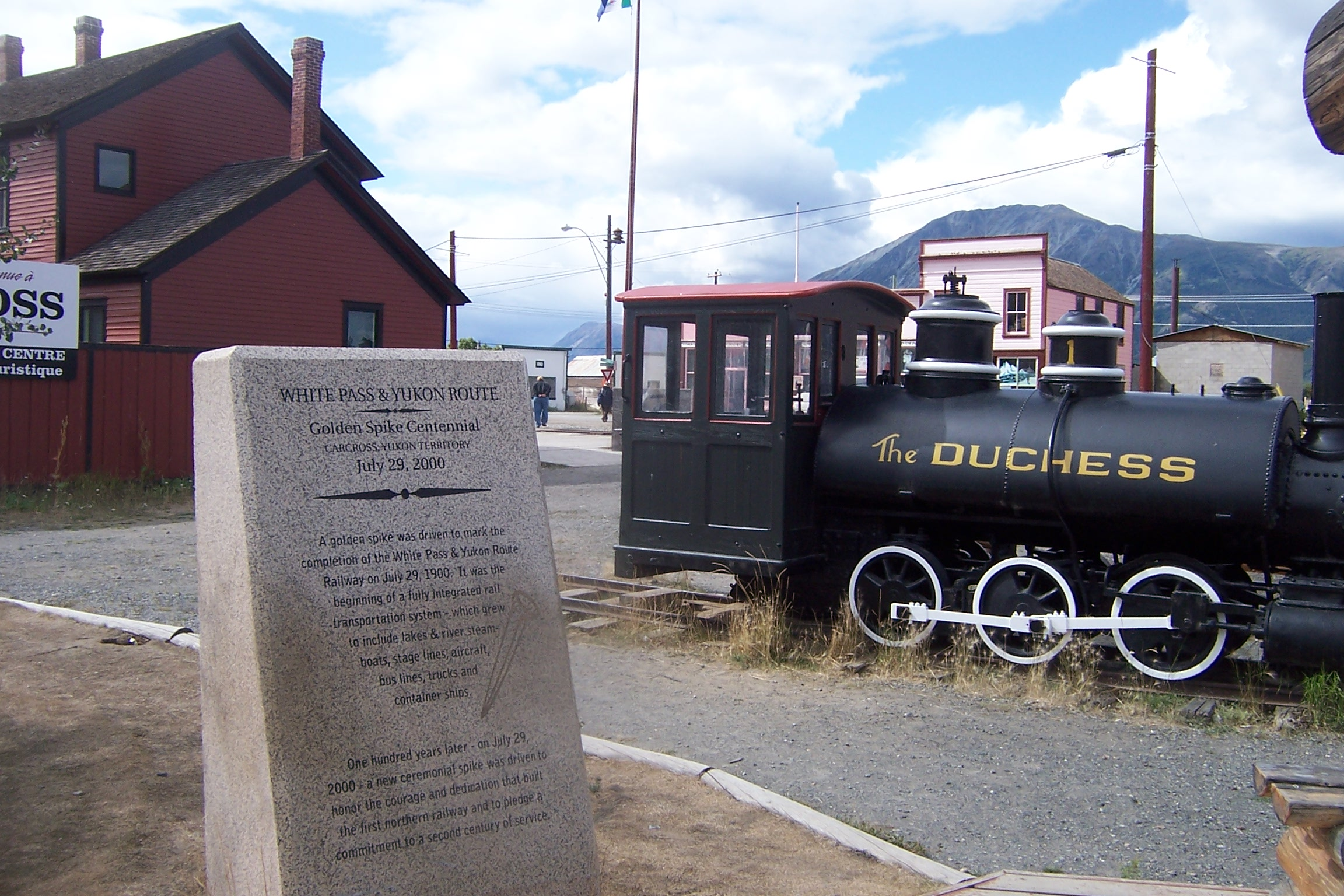
After arriving in Carcross, teams had to locate a steam engine called "The Duchess".

- Episode 4: "Grab a 'Nug" (August 5, 2013)
- Prize: An all-inclusive trip to Cancún, Mexico (awarded to Jet & Dave)
- Eliminated: Kristen & Darren

Locations

- Calgary (Clarion Calgary)
- Calgary (Calgary International Airport) → Yellowknife, Northwest Territories (Yellowknife Airport)
- Yellowknife (Bush Pilot's Monument)
- Yellowknife (Government Dock)
- Yellowknife (Great Slave Lake – Yellowknife Bay Floating Bed & Breakfast)
- Yellowknife (Yellowknife Airport) → Carcross, Yukon (Carcross Airport)
- Carcross (White Pass and Yukon Railway Last Spike – "The Duchess")
- Carcross (Bennett Lake)
- Carcross (Carcross Desert)

Episode summary

- At the start of this leg, teams were instructed to fly to Yellowknife, Northwest Territories. Once there, teams had to drive themselves to Bush Pilot's Monument and search the grounds for their next clue. Teams then had to make their way to Yellowknife Bay Floating Bed & Breakfast to find their next clue.
- In this leg's Roadblock, one team member had to strip down to a bathing suit and socks, jump into a hole in the ice, and retrieve their clue from the opposite side of the freezing water.
- After the Roadblock, teams had to find Arctic Sunwest Charters at Yellowknife Airport and sign up for one of three charter flights, each departing 20 minutes apart, to Carcross, Yukon. The first two bush planes carried two teams each, while the last plane carried three teams. Once there, teams found their next clue by "The Duchess".
- For their Speed Bump, Tim Sr. & Tim Jr. had to correctly memorize and recite the first four stanzas of "The Shooting of Dan McGrew" to a Robert W. Service impersonator before they could continue racing.
- This leg's Detour was a choice between Yukon Supply Run or Klondike Gold Rush. In Yukon Supply Run, teams had to use the provided tools and materials to build a raft and paddle themselves out into the lake to retrieve their next clue. In Klondike Gold Rush, teams completed three games. First, they had to use a two-man saw to cut off a slice of wood from a log. Next, both team members had to toss a hatchet so that it stuck to a wooden target. Finally, one team member had to ride in a wheelbarrow direct their blindfolded partner around a course while collecting five "gold nuggets", which could be exchanged for their next clue. Vanessa & Celina used their Express Pass to bypass this Detour.
- After the Detour, team members had to drive an ATV to the Pit Stop: the Carcross Desert.

=== Leg 5 (Yukon → Saskatchewan) ===
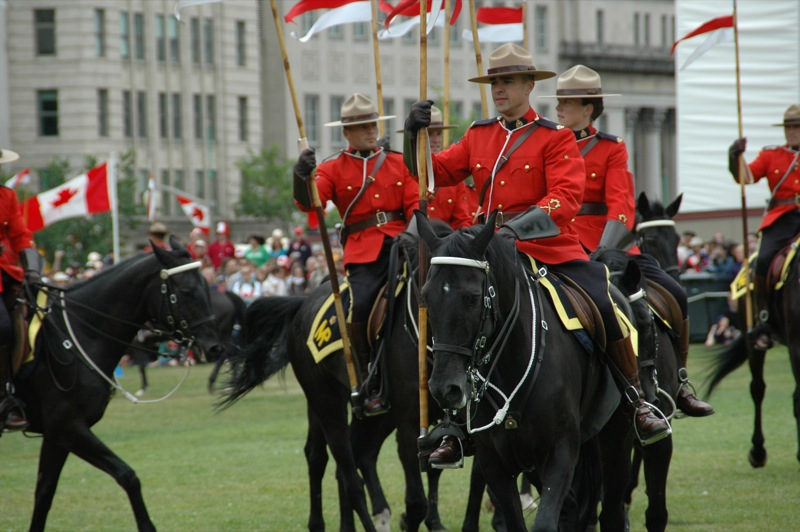
For the Roadblock in Regina, racers experienced the recruitment process of the Royal Canadian Mounted Police.

- Episode 5: "Death By Lentils" (August 12, 2013)
- Prizes: Two round trip plane tickets to anywhere in Canada (awarded to Jet & Dave)
- Eliminated: Hal & Joanne

Locations

- Whitehorse (Yukon River)
- Whitehorse (SS Klondike)
- Whitehorse (Erik Nielsen Whitehorse International Airport) → Regina, Saskatchewan (Regina International Airport)
- Regina (Saskcan Pulse Trading Company)
- Regina (RCMP Heritage Centre)
- Regina (Regina City Hall – 'I Love Regina' Sign)
- Regina (Mosaic Stadium at Taylor Field)
- Regina (Mosaic Stadium at Taylor Field – Luxury Box)
- Regina (Wascana Centre – Pine Island)

Episode summary

- At the start of this leg, teams had to search the decks of the SS Klondike for their next clue. Teams were instructed to fly to Regina, Saskatchewan. Once there, teams had to search the airport parking lot for a marked vehicle with a BlackBerry Z10, which they tapped using the parking attendants' Z10 to reveal directions to their next location: Saskcan Pulse Trading Company. There, teams had to dig through a dry bulk trailer full of lentils to find two Sergeant Bullmoose plush toys (one tagged "RCMP" and the other tagged "Heritage Centre"), which was the location of their next clue.
- In this leg's Roadblock, one team member had to dress in a Royal Canadian Mounted Police cadet uniform and take a supply of clothes to a boot camp bedroom known as "the pit", where they had to place their clothes in the closet and cabinets and make their bed exactly like a prepared room. If a sergeant major believed the room met RCMP standards, the racer received their next clue; otherwise any misplaced clothes would be dump onto the bed and the racer had to start again.
- After the Roadblock, teams had to perform a Ukrainian dance at the Regina City Hall before receiving their next clue.
- This leg's Detour was a choice between Brawn or Beauty. In Brawn, teams had to perform a series of Canadian football drills. Then, one team member had to catch a touchdown pass from coach Khari Jones, while the other team member had to complete a field goal to receive their next clue. If teams failed, they had to run a lap around the field and start over. In Beauty, teams had to learn a choreographed cheerleading routine. They then had to correctly perform the routine for Saskatchewan Roughriders fans to receive their next clue from the team mascot, Gainer the Gopher.
- After the Detour, teams found their next clue in the stadium's luxury box directing them to the Pit Stop: Pine Island.

Additional notes

- This leg featured a Double U-Turn. Tim Sr. & Tim Jr. chose to use the U-Turn on Hal & Joanne, while Hal & Joanne chose to use the U-Turn on Holly & Brett.
- The lentil search task was later revisited in season 10 as a Switchback.

=== Leg 6 (Saskatchewan → Quebec) ===
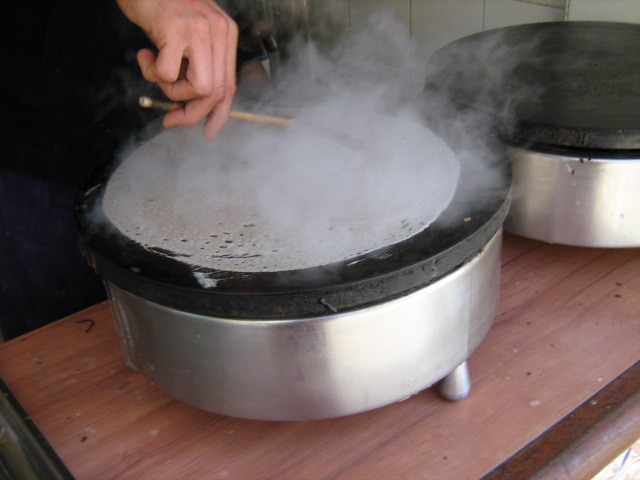
The Roadblock in Quebec City required one team member to make four proper crêpes using a crêpe maker.

- Episode 6: "Check the Cannons!" (August 19, 2013)
- Prizes: Two round trip plane tickets to anywhere in Europe (awarded to Jet & Dave)

Locations

- Regina (Wascana Centre – Pine Island)
- Regina (Regina International Airport) → Quebec City, Quebec (Québec City Jean Lesage International Airport)
- Lévis (Lévis Forts National Historic Site)
- Lévis (Levis Ferry Terminal) → Quebec City (Port of Quebec)
- Quebec City (Château Frontenac – Statue of Samuel de Champlain)
- Quebec City (Place Royale – Notre-Dame-des-Victoires or Parc de la Cetière & 102 Rue du Petit-Champlain)
- Quebec City (Place de l'Université-du-Québec (in French))
- Quebec City (Plains of Abraham – Terrain de Sport)
- Quebec City (The Battlefields Park – Avenue Saint-Denis)

Episode summary

- At the start of this leg, teams were instructed to fly to Quebec City, Quebec. Once there, teams had to travel to Lévis Forts National Historic Site, where they had to search for their next clue when the fortress opened the next morning. After finding their clue at Lévis Forts, teams had to board a ferry across the Saint Lawrence River and take the Old Quebec Funicular to Château Frontenac, where they find the statue of Samuel de Champlain at Dufferin Terrace, where they found their next clue.
- This leg's Detour was a choice between Sculpt It or Spot It. In Sculpt It, teams had to travel to the Place Royale near Notre-Dame-des-Victoires and choose an ice block with an outline of a star, house, or boat. They then had to chisel the ice to create an ice sculpture and their next clue. In Spot It, teams had to find a replica of the Rue du Petit-Champlain mural in the Parc de la Cetière with missing items. They then had to find the original mural at 102 Rue du Petit-Champlain and place magnets with Québécois French words in the appropriate spots to receive their next clue.
- After the Detour, teams found their next clue at Place de l'Université-du-Québec.
- In this leg's Roadblock, one team member had to take orders from two patrons in Québécois French. Team members then had to find the correct ingredients from their order and prepare four crêpes, two savory and two sweet. A chef demonstrated how to properly make and plate the crêpes. Once they correctly made and served all four crêpes, the chef gave them their next clue.
- After the Roadblock, teams had to play lacrosse on the Plains of Abraham. Each team member had to catch a pass from their partner and score a goal to receive their next clue directing them to the Pit Stop: The Battlefields Park.

Additional note

- This was a non-elimination leg.

=== Leg 7 (Quebec → Nunavut) ===
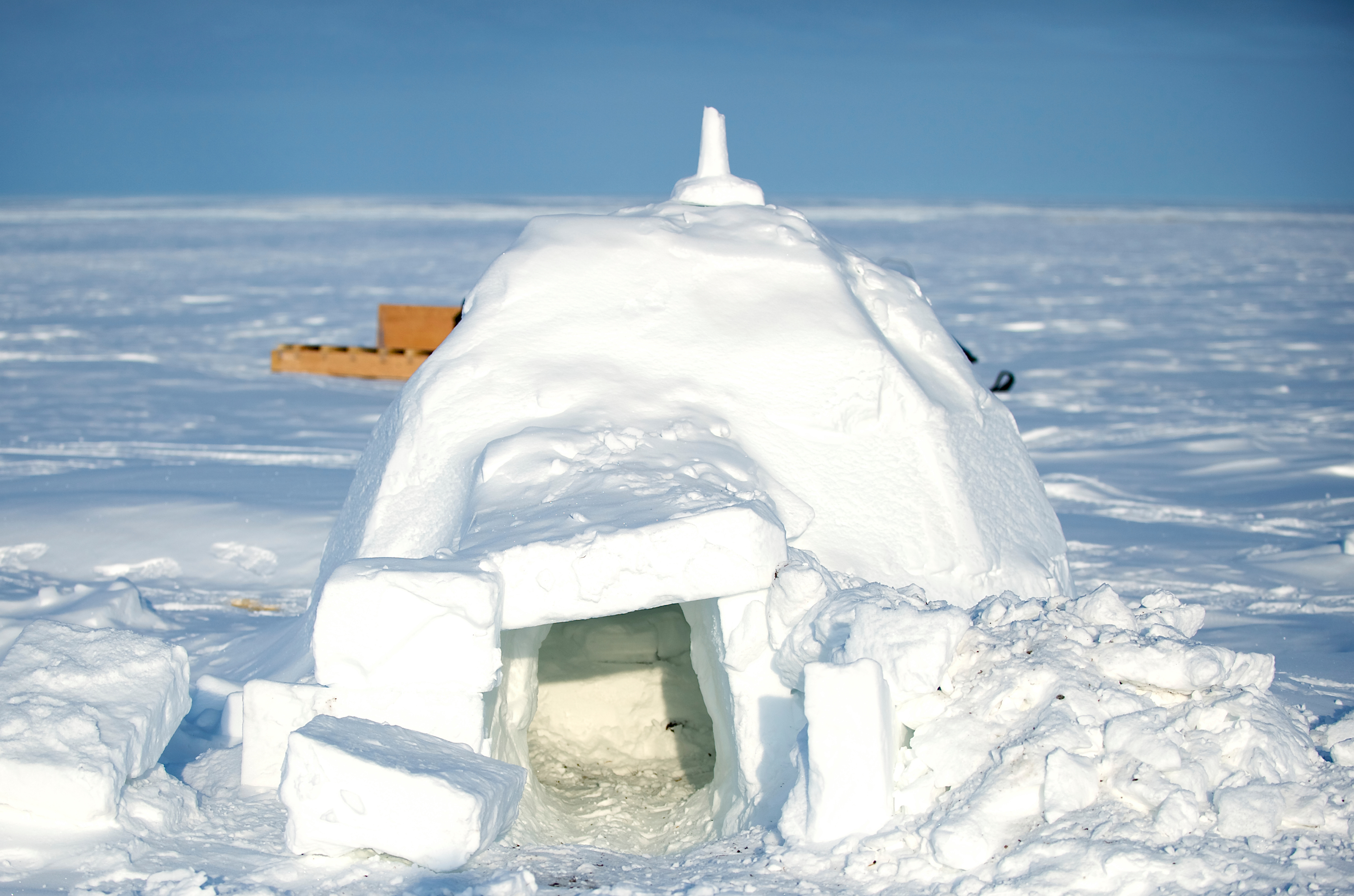
Teams were required to construct a traditional Inuit igloo as one side of the Detour tasks in Nunavut.

- Episode 7: "We Don't Have Time for the Bathroom" (August 26, 2013)
- Prizes: Two round trip plane tickets to anywhere in the Caribbean (awarded to Jody & Cory)
- Eliminated: Holly & Brett

Locations

- Quebec City (Parliament Building)
- Quebec City (Québec City Jean Lesage International Airport) → Iqaluit, Nunavut (Iqaluit Airport)
- Baffin Region (Sylvia Grinnell Territorial Park)
- Baffin Region (Sylvia Grinnell Territorial Park – Sylvia Grinnell River)
- Baffin Region (Frobisher Bay)
- Iqaluit (Hudson's Bay Company Trading Post)
- Iqaluit (Panoramic Lookout)

Episode summary

- At the start of this leg, teams were instructed to fly to Iqaluit, Nunavut. On the Iqaluit Airport tarmac, teams found their next clue written entirely in Inuktitut, leaving them to figure out that their next clue was at the Sylvia Grinnell Territorial Park. There, teams had to locate two throat singers near the Sylvia Grinnell River and listen to an Inuit throat singing performance before receiving their next clue.
- This leg's Detour was a choice between Harpoon Hunter or Igloo Builder. In Harpoon Hunter, one team member had to put on snow shoes and pull their teammate on a sled one kilometre (0.62 mi) across the Sylvia Grinnell River basin. They then both had to throw a traditional harpoon and hit the center of a target. Once both team members were successful, the other team member had to pull the sled back to the starting point to receive their next clue. In Igloo Builder, teams had to build an igloo using only the provided tools and pre-cut 30-pound (14 kg) blocks of snow to the satisfaction of an Inuk elder to receive their next clue.
- For their Speed Bump, Tim Sr. & Tim Jr. had to lead a dog sled team across Frobisher Bay, retrieve a food cache, and deliver it back to the starting point before they could continue racing.
- After the Detour, teams had to travel by snowmobile across Frobisher Bay to the Hudson's Bay Company Trading Post.
- In this leg's Roadblock, one team member had to consume 10 pieces of muktuk – whale skin and blubber – to receive their next clue.
- After the Roadblock, teams had to walk uphill one kilometre (0.62 mi) from the Hudson Bay Trading Post to the top of a mountain marked with inuksuk to find the Pit Stop.

=== Leg 8 (Nunavut → Nova Scotia) ===
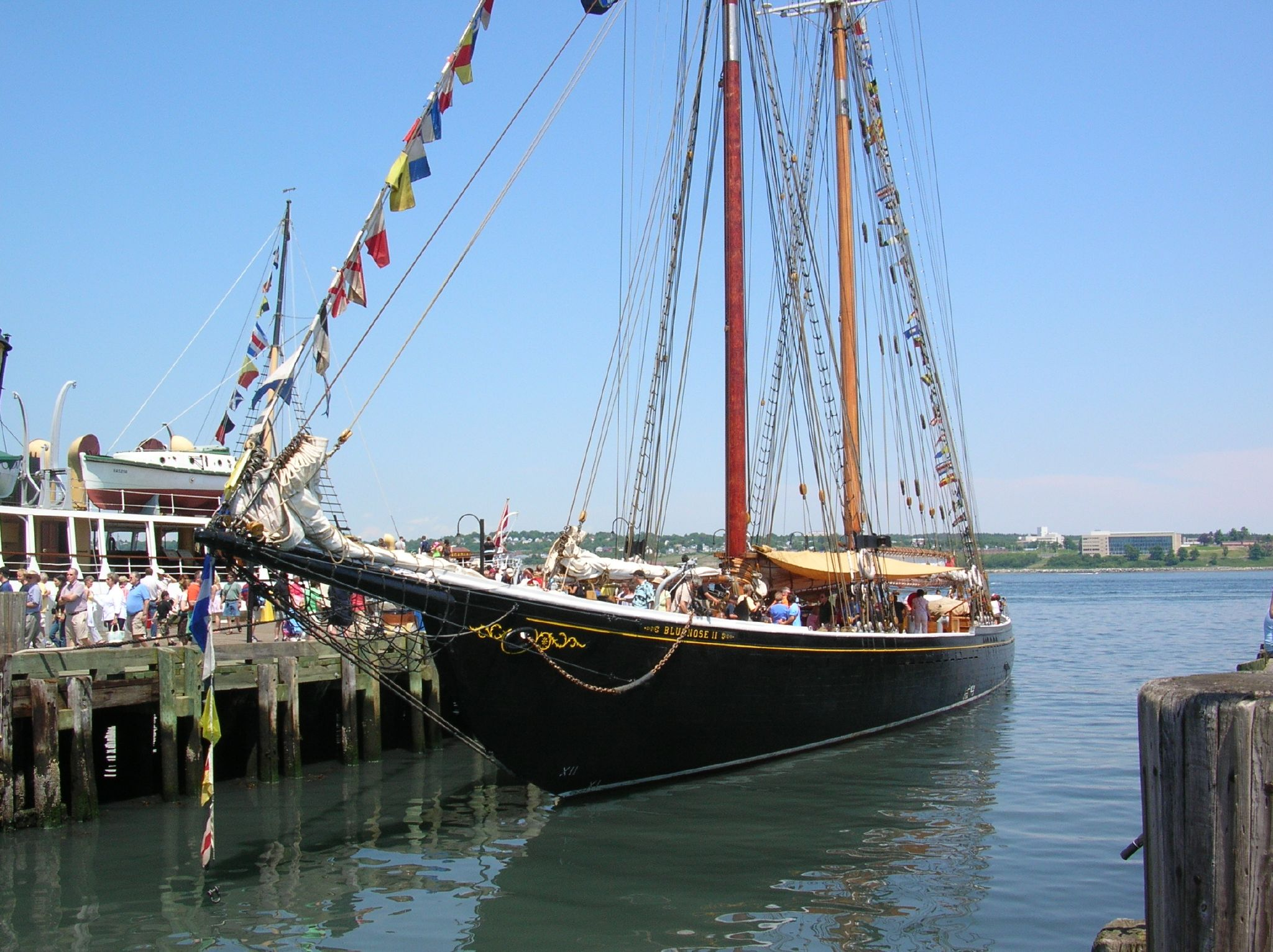
The Bluenose II in Lunenburg served as the Pit Stop for this leg.

- Episode 8: "Clutch and Release" (September 2, 2013)
- Prizes: Two round trip plane tickets to anywhere in South America (awarded to Jody & Cory)

Locations

- Iqaluit (Astro Hill Complex)
- Iqaluit (Iqaluit Airport) → Halifax, Nova Scotia (Halifax Stanfield International Airport)
- Halifax (Pier 21)
- Mahone Bay (St. James' Anglican Church)
- Mahone Bay (Gazebo Cafe – Gazebo)
- Lunenburg (Fisheries Museum of the Atlantic)
- Lunenburg (Lunenburg Harbour & Grand Banker Seafood Bar & Grill or Boscawen Inn & Zwicker Wharf)
- Lunenburg (St. John's Anglican Church)
- Lunenburg (Bluenose II)

Episode summary

- At the start of this leg, teams were instructed to fly to Halifax, Nova Scotia. At the Halifax airport, teams found a USB flash drive inside their marked vehicle, which contained a message that teams had to play on the car's MyLink video system and directed them to Pier 21. When Pier 21 opened, teams received a passport and had to find seven different stamps and ink them onto the passport to receive their next clue.
- In this leg's Roadblock, one team member had to search for the scarecrow pictured on a BlackBerry Z10. Once they found the scarecrow, they had to bring it to a gazebo, where they had to build a copy of it using the provided items. When they were ready for inspection, they had to take a photograph of the scarecrow and hand it to a scarecrow expert. If the expert was satisfied, he gave teams their next clue.
- After the Roadblock, teams found their next clue at the Fisheries Museum of the Atlantic.
- This leg's Detour was a choice between Surf or Turf. In Surf, teams made their way to Lunenburg Harbour, where they had to board a lobster fishing boat and pull six lobster traps from the sea. They then had to band the claws of each lobster and then deliver them to the Grand Banker Seafood Bar & Grill to receive their next clue. In Turf, teams had to make their way to Boscawen Inn, where they were presented with samples of 12 different kinds of sausages and had to memorize their German names. They then had to run to Zwicker Wharf and identify the 12 sausages from an unlabeled set of samples to receive their next clue.
- After the Detour, teams found their next clue at St. John's Anglican Church: a Canadian dime, which features the Bluenose sailing ship on its reverse. Teams had to make their way to its successor – the Bluenose II – to find the Pit Stop.

Additional note

- There was no elimination at the end of this leg; all teams were instead instructed to continue racing.

=== Leg 9 (Nova Scotia → Newfoundland and Labrador) ===
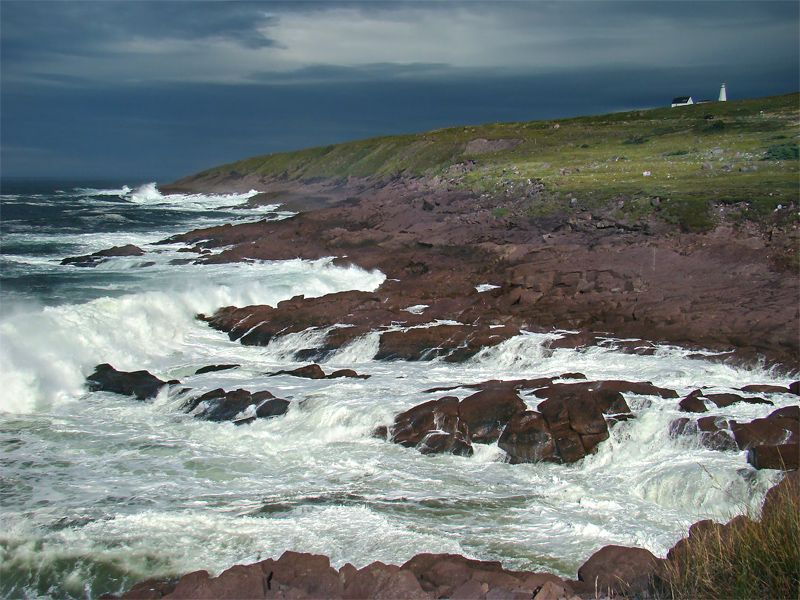
Teams finished the penultimate leg at Cape Spear: the easternmost point of both Canada and North America.

- Episode 9: "Ah-mazing" (September 9, 2013)
- Prizes: Air Canada Altitude Super Elite 100K status for a year and a BBM Video Chat with their loved ones during the Pit Stop (awarded to Jody & Cory)
- Eliminated: Jet & Dave

Locations

- Lunenburg → North Sydney (North Sydney Ferry Terminal)
- North Sydney (North Sydney Ferry Terminal) → Port aux Basques, Newfoundland and Labrador (Port aux Basques Ferry Terminal)
- St. John's (The Rooms) (Unaired)
- St. John's (Trans-Canada Highway Mile Zero – Terry Fox Memorial Site)
- St. John's (Quidi Vidi – Quidi Vidi Brewing Company)
- St. John's (Shea Heights Overlook)
- Petty Harbour–Maddox Cove (Petty Harbour Fisherman's Co-op) or St. John's (Harbourside Park & Holloway Street)
- St. John's (O'Brien's Music Store)
- St. John's (George Street)
- St. John's (Cape Spear)

Episode summary

- At the start of this leg, teams were instructed to travel by bus to North Sydney and then by ferry to Port aux Basques, Newfoundland and Labrador. Once there, teams had to run to one of three waiting shuttles that took them to St. John's. The first and second shuttles carried only one team each, while the third shuttle carried the last two teams.
- At the Terry Fox Memorial Site, teams had to memorize a quotation from Terry Fox – "I just wish people would realize that anything's possible if you try; dreams are made if people try." Teams then had to travel to the Quidi Vidi Brewing Company and had to recite Terry Fox's quotation from memory. If they were correct, they were granted entry into a traditional Newfoundland kitchen party, where each team member had to kiss a cod and drink a shot of Newfoundland Screech before receiving their next clue directing them to Shea Heights Overlook.
- This season's final Detour was a choice between Tell a Tale or Wag a Tail. In Tell a Tale, teams had to travel to the Petty Harbour dock, listen to two local fishermen tell a story in Newfoundland slang, and relay the story verbatim to a group of nearby listeners to receive their next clue. In Wag a Tail, teams travelled to Harbourside Park and chose a Newfoundland dog. They then loaded up a cart with four dozen eggs and twelve bottles of milk and had to lead the dog up an extremely steep street known as "Heart Attack Hill" to deliver the goods undamaged to four households to receive their next clue.
- After the Detour, teams found their next clue at O'Brien's Music Store.
- In this leg's Roadblock, one team member could use any items available to them in the music store to perform on George Street and earn C$50 from passersby to receive their next clue.
- After the Roadblock, teams had to find the Pit Stop at the most easterly point of North America, leaving them to figure out that it was Cape Spear.

Additional note

- Once in St. John's, teams had to search the grounds of The Rooms to find their next clue. This segment was unaired.

=== Leg 10 (Newfoundland and Labrador → Ontario) ===
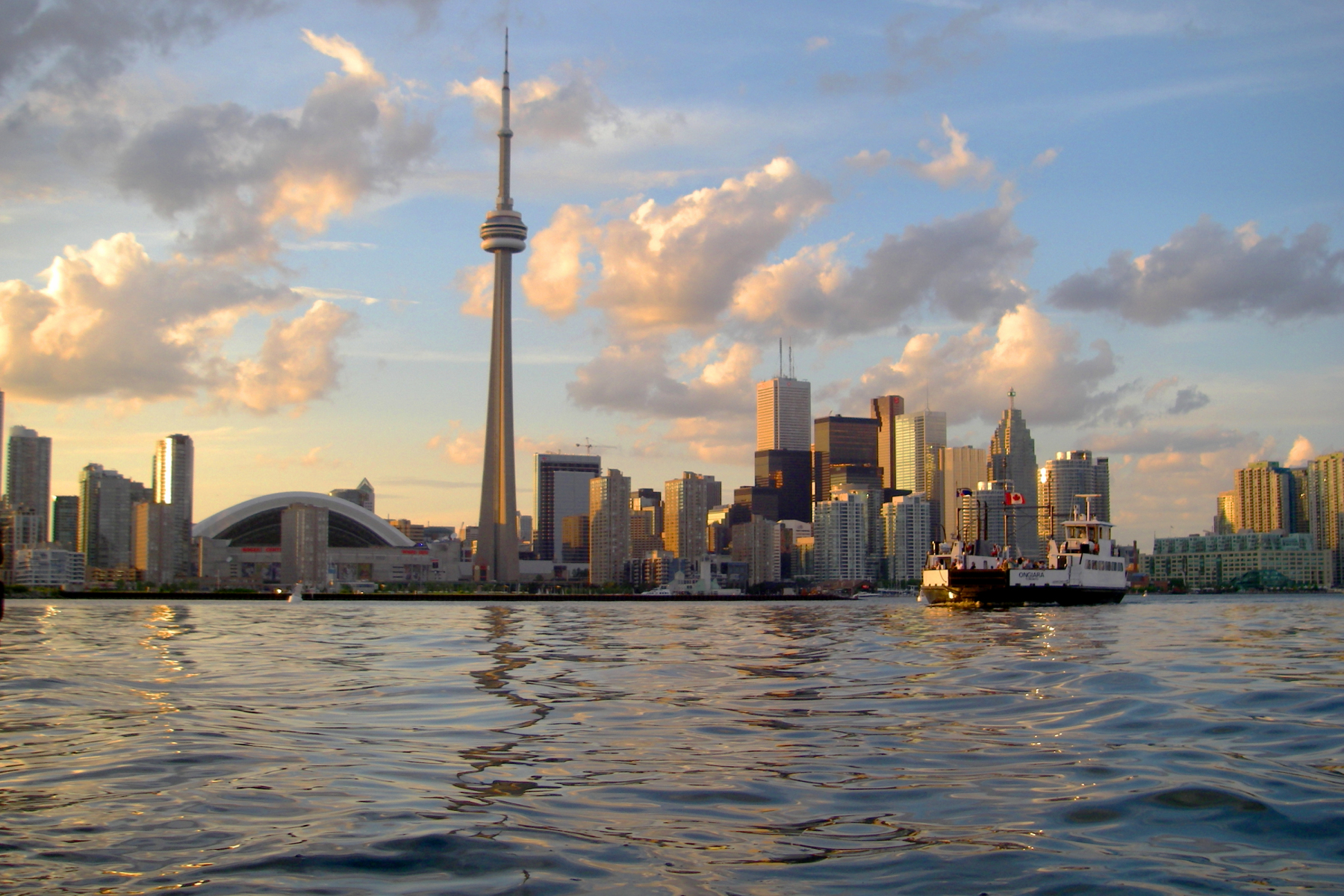
The skyline of the city of Toronto, as seen from Olympic Island, was the backdrop of the season's finish line.

- Episode 10: "The Family Race Off" (September 16, 2013)
- Prizes: A CA$250,000 cash payout, air travel for a year anywhere Air Canada flies worldwide, and two Chevrolet Corvette Stingrays (awarded to Tim Sr. & Tim Jr.)
- Winners: Tim Sr. & Tim Jr.
- Runners-up: Jody & Cory
- Third place: Vanessa & Celina

Locations

- St. John's (Harbourside Park)
- St. John's (St. John's International Airport) → Toronto, Ontario (Toronto Pearson International Airport)
- Toronto (L Tower)
- Toronto (Cadbury Gladstone Chocolate Factory)
- Toronto (Toronto Zoo)
- Toronto (Evergreen Brick Works)
- Toronto (Jack Layton Ferry Terminal → Olympic Island)

Episode summary

- At the start of this leg, teams were instructed to fly to Toronto, Ontario. Once there, teams had to search outside Pearson airport for a woman wearing a maple leaf baseball cap, who had their next clue directing them to the L Tower.
- In this leg's first Roadblock, one team member had to rappel face-first down the side of the L Tower, which was under construction at the time. After reuniting with their partner, racers could open the clue that they received at the top of the building.
- After the first Roadblock, teams found Cadbury Caramilk bar inside their clue envelope, leaving them to figure out that they had to find the Cadbury Gladstone Chocolate Factory. There, teams had to search through cartons of Cadbury Caramilk bars to find one of three "golden chocolate bars". Once they found one, teams were given a golden key to unlock a safe in the president's office containing their next clue directing them to the Toronto Zoo. There, teams had to search the grounds for their next clue, which was inside the panda exhibit. Teams then had to find their next clue at Evergreen Brick Works.
- In this season's final Roadblock, the team member who did not perform the previous Roadblock had to match the provincial and territorial flags of the provinces and territories visited during the race with their respective floral emblems onto a map board to receive their final clue directing them to the finish line: Olympic Island. If racers were sharp, they would have noticed the flags printed onto their Pit Start clues and that the Pit Stop greeters on each leg wore the floral emblems of their province or territory. The correct answers were:

Correct answers
Locale	Flag	Flower
British Columbia	British Columbia	Pacific Dogwood
Alberta	Alberta	Wild Rose
Northwest Territories	Northwest Territories	Mountain Avens
Yukon	Yukon	Fireweed
Saskatchewan	Saskatchewan	Western Red Lily
Quebec	Quebec	Blue Flag Iris
Nunavut	Nunavut	Purple Saxifrage
Nova Scotia	Nova Scotia	Mayflower
Newfoundland and Labrador	Newfoundland and Labrador	Purple Pitcher Plant
Ontario	Ontario	White Trillium

== Ratings ==
The season ranked as the number one new show in Canada, and the number one show in Canada for the year, with an average audience of 3.5 million viewers.

#	Airdate	Episode	Viewers (millions)	Rank (Night)	Rank (Week)	Ref
1	July 15, 2013	"Where in the World is Ogopogo?"	2.99	1	1	
2	July 22, 2013	"Se Hou Leng"	2.87	1	1	
3	July 29, 2013	"Hoodoos and Hoodonts"	2.91	1	1	
4	August 5, 2013	"Grab a Nug"	2.43	1	1	
5	August 12, 2013	"Death By Lentils"	2.87	1	1	
6	August 19, 2013	"Check the Cannons!"	2.94	1	1	
7	August 26, 2013	"We Don't Have Time for the Bathroom"	2.79	1	1	
8	September 2, 2013	"Clutch and Release"	2.79	1	1	
9	September 9, 2013	"Ah-mazing"	2.87	1	1	
10	September 16, 2013	"The Family Race Off"	3.06	1	1	

- Episode 4, "Grab a Nug", aired on Civic Holiday Monday.
- Episode 8, "Clutch and Release", aired on Labour Day.
