= Stuart Park =

Stuart Park is the name of:

- Stuart Park, British Columbia, park located in Kelowna. British Columbia
- Stuart Park, Northern Territory, suburb of the city of Darwin
- Stuart Park (museum director), New Zealand museum director
