= Hal Johnson and Joanne McLeod =

Canadian fitness educators, television personalities

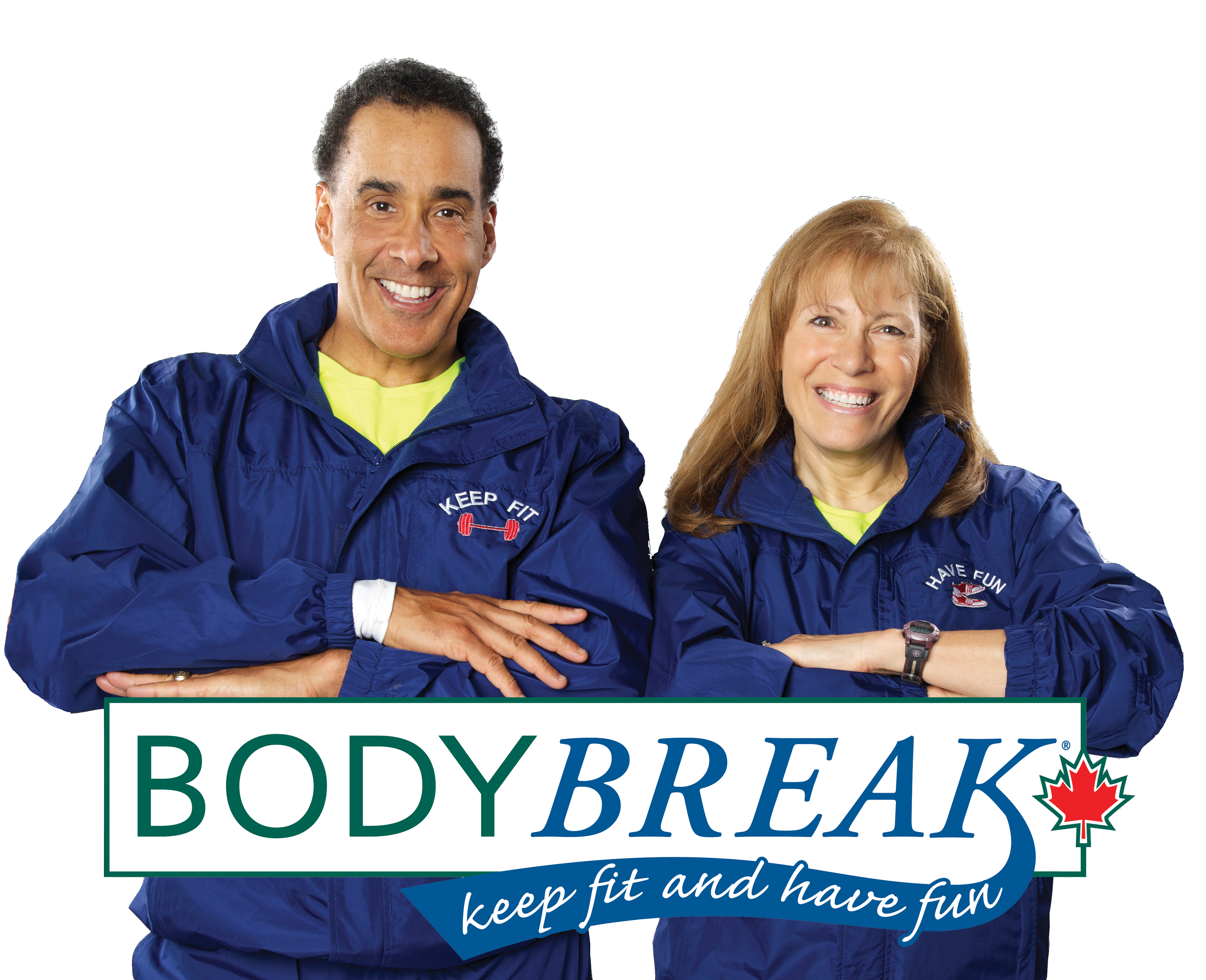
Hal Johnson and Joanne McLeod

Hal Johnson and Joanne McLeod are Canadian television hosts and former international-level athletes. They are best known for their television segments called BodyBreak, which have been in intermittent production since 1988. The program is considered a cult classic among Canadian pop culture.

Johnson and McLeod were both international-level athletes, Johnson with basketball and McLeod with the track and field discipline of hurdles. The duo self-financed the pilot for BodyBreak in 1990. Rejected by over 40 companies, the first 65 episodes were funded by ParticipACTION. Over 300 short episodes have been produced, as well as a single-season television series. They have expanded the program into speaking engagements, exercise clothing and equipment, and other projects. As a result of racism that Johnson and his parents experienced, their programs and products have intentionally sought to feature an inclusive cast.

== Biographies ==
=== Hal Johnson ===
Hal Johnson
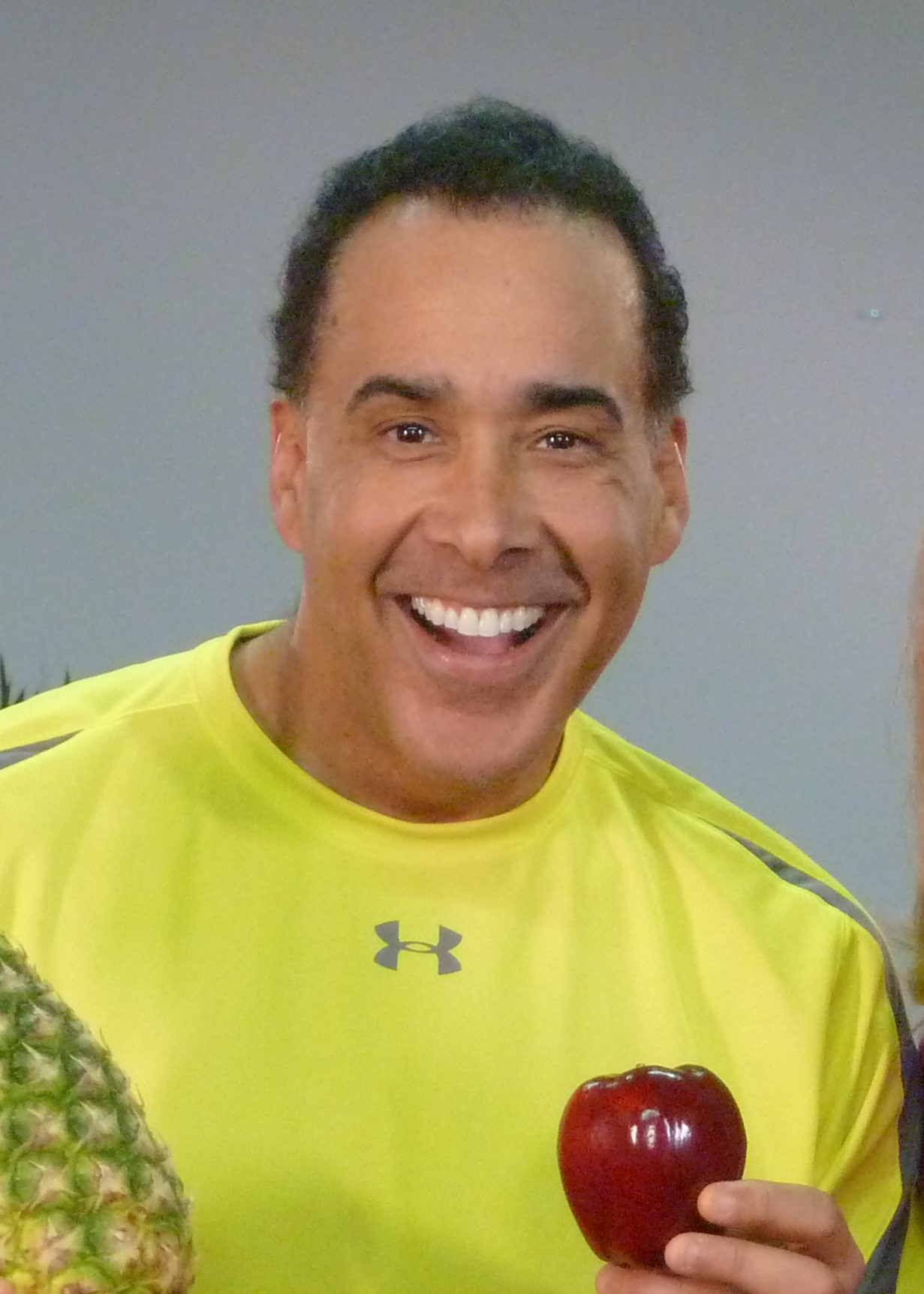
- Hal Johnson in 2011
- Born: June 14, 1956 (age 70); Philadelphia, Pennsylvania

Johnson was born in the United States, and grew up in North York, Ontario, the child of Black and Irish parents. (Johnson has spoken on the racism they faced for their mixed marriage.) Johnson was diagnosed with dyslexia as a child; he would later memorize all the lines for BodyBreak.

The captain of his high school's hockey, baseball, basketball and football teams, Johnson attended the University of Colorado on a baseball scholarship, earning a business degree. An all-star first baseman, he represented Canada at the World Baseball Championship.

For a 10 year period, Johnson lived in the United States, attending the University of Colorado, and living in Washington, D.C., Long Beach, San Francisco, Denver, and Boulder.

After his athletic career, Johnson was hired at TSN as a sports reporter. Network executives rescinded that offer the same day it was made, stating that they didn't want a second Black reporter. TSN later issued an apology. As an extra in an advertisement for Woodbine Racetrack, during the 1980s, Johnson was moved so that he wouldn't be sitting next to a white woman. These experiences of racism, as well as the experiences of his parents, helped push Johnson to create BodyBreak as a countermeasure. The show deliberately sought inclusive casting. Johnson has commented that "the media has not only a tremendous responsibility, but a tremendous power" to influence public perception and acceptance. In 2020, the topic of racism became central, following the protests initiated by the murder of George Floyd. Johnson recorded an unscripted video titled "How We Battled Racism". The video received wide attention in Canada, and led to Johnson speaking on the subject on many media outlets.

Johnson appeared on Off the Record with Michael Landsberg over 100 times. He acted in various television series between 1988 and 1990, including day player roles in T. and T., Alfred Hitchcock Presents, and E.N.G.

Johnson is famous for his thick moustache, which he shaved at some point before his 2013 audition for The Amazing Race Canada.

=== Joanne McLeod ===
Joanne McLeod
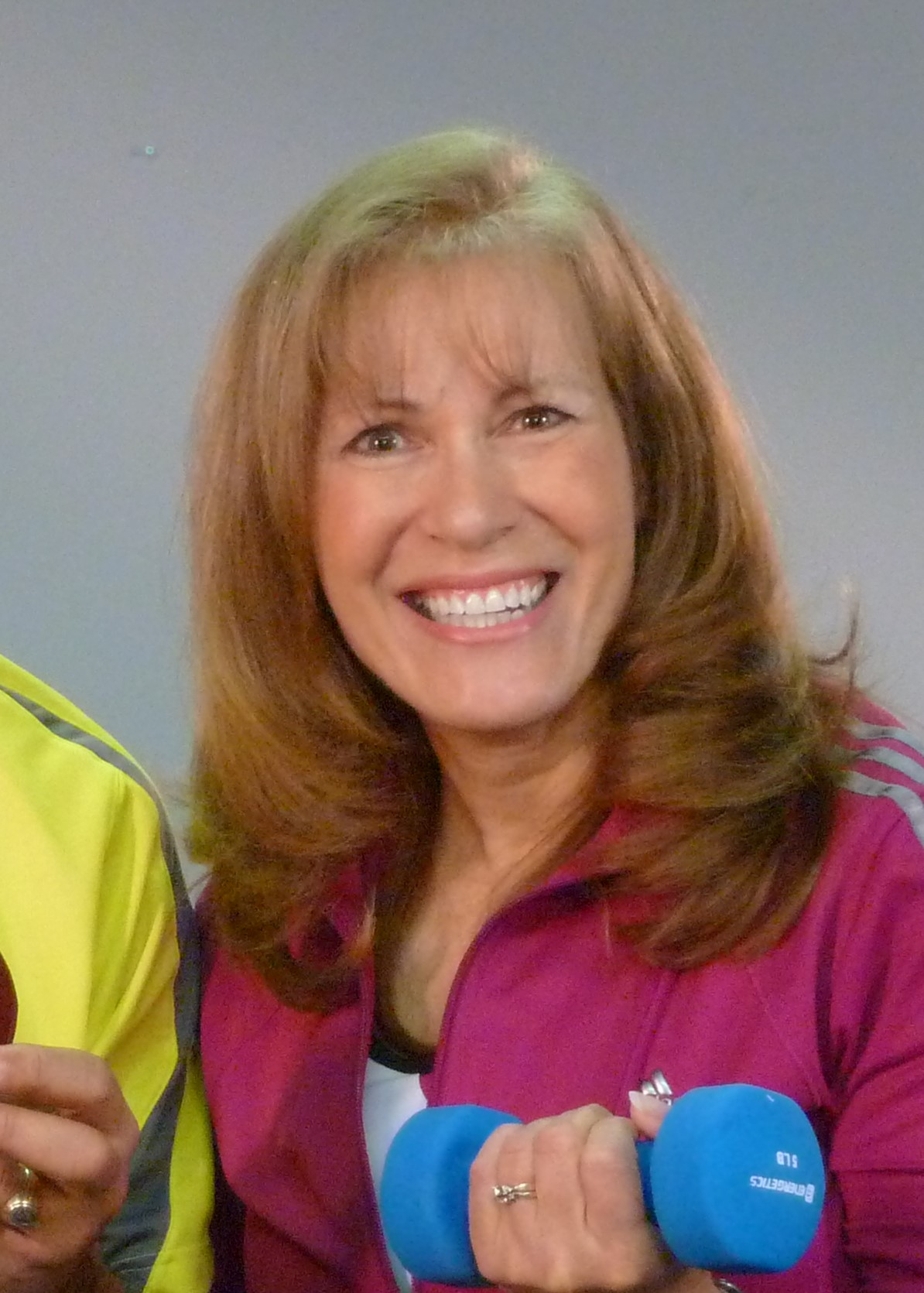
- Joanne McLeod in 2011
- Born: September 18, 1958 (age 67)

McLeod is of German and Italian heritage, and grew up in the Toronto suburb of Scarborough, Ontario with her adoptive family. McLeod's high school physical education teacher, who had competed at the 1968 Olympic Games, encouraged her to join a track club. She became a 4-time national and 7-time provincial hurdle champion. She represented Canada at events including the Pacific Conference Games, World Cup, Tri-Meet-Canada/PolandEngland, and the 1978 Commonwealth Games.

As of 2013, McLeod was reported to be still running marathons.

=== As a couple ===
Johnson and McLeod met in a gym, and started to date. They married in 1999. Together they tour the country doing speaking engagements related to health and teamwork. After living for a time in Mississauga, the couple has lived in Oakville, Ontario since 2000.

== BodyBreak ==
=== Segments ===
Over 300 90-second episodes of BodyBreak have been produced, with the first 128 segments created between 1988 and 1994. The show focuses on how exercise can be incorporated into daily life. The program was conceived by McLeod and Johnson after meeting in a gym. The show was designed to be different than other fitness shows of the era: friendly, representing the sexes equally, and showing racial and physical diversity, a result of Johnson's experiences. Collectively, they financed the show's pilot with their last $2000. Johnson worked on the series, while McLeod worked at Canada Life insurance to pay their bills. Three two-minute segments were filmed in July 1988, in Toronto's Sherwood Park, as a pilot.

More than 40 TV stations, ad agencies, and other corporations turned the pitch down. More than one was concerned with the image of people of different ethnic backgrounds interacting as equals. One was open to airing the program, but only if Joanne McLeod was joined by a white man; at least one report lists that broadcaster as TSN. Johnson decided to seek funding for the project from ParticipACTION, a federal government program. The organization commissioned five segments, with an additional order placed in January 1989, before the first airing. The Canadian Broadcasting Corporation was the first network to air the spots.

ParticipACTION dropped the hosts in 1991, after they had completed 65 segments, despite being the agency's most popular spots. They found different funding, and were able to continue production in 1992. They produced segments with Canada's Vitality project from 1993 to 1995. The segments were broadcast during commercial breaks as public service announcements on many Canadian television channels, but the most frequent broadcaster of the program was TSN.

=== Television series ===
In 1995, Life Network commissioned a 13 half-hour episode series based on the popular segments, which it aired in primetime. Most of the episodes included people with disabilities.

=== Business ===
Johnson has stated that the duo has "no business plan," so that they don't close themselves off from unexpected opportunities.

In 2020, Johnson commented that "as many successes that we've had, we've had a hundred failures. I expect that. I expect to fail... I'll find another way around it."

The BodyBreak brand has been used on a treadmill, Ab Master Workout, Step Workout, and other products. Hal and Joanne have also endorsed products without the trademark, including BackJoy.

=== Appearances ===
The couple competed in season 1 of The Amazing Race Canada. The duo spent months preparing for the competition, including studying prime ministers and Air Canada routes, as well as practising driving stick shift Chevrolet (one of the show's sponsor) cars at the dealership. They finished in sixth place. They felt they were portrayed in the series as "very vanilla," until the final episode, in which McLeod accidentally swore.

In the months following The Amazing Race, they were the grand marshals of the 2013 Kitchener-Waterloo Oktoberfest Parade, and guest "anchors" on news comedy program This Hour Has 22 Minutes. Johnson and McLeod appeared in the music video for Sam Weber's "Anybodys'", chasing an anthropomorphized version of Johnson's mustache. They self-parodied in a promotion for Netflix zombie series Santa Clarita Diet; BuzzFeed deemed them "the cutest cannibals." They created a COVID-19 physical distancing segment for Vancouver International Airport.

Maclean's magazine has mused that "Trying to explain the cultural significance that “Hal and Joanne” have taken on since then is like trying to explain the cultural significance of Tim Hortons."
