= Fisheries Museum of the Atlantic =

Museum in Nova Scotia, Canada

Coordinates: 44.3761°N 64.3122°W

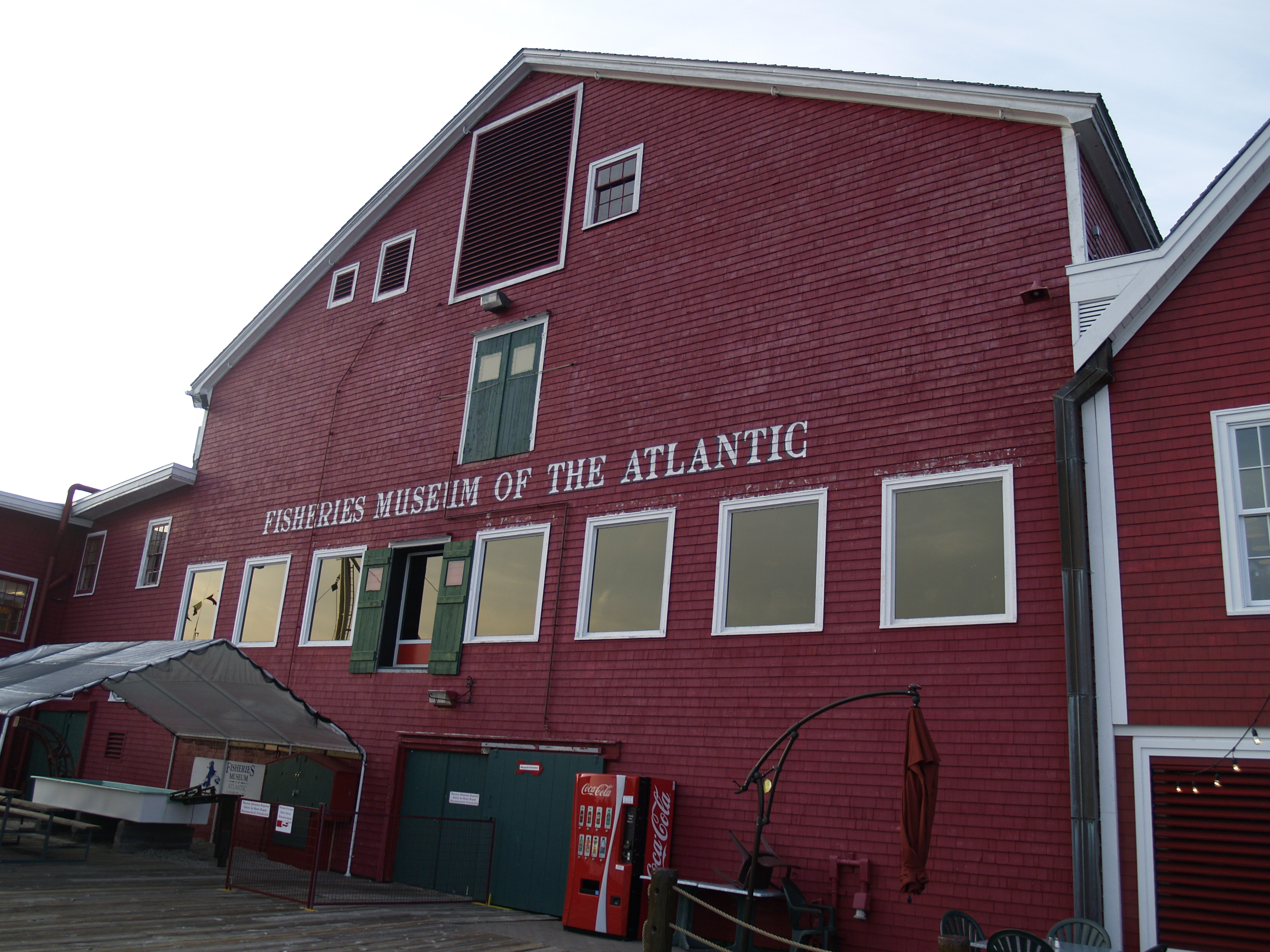
Fisheries Museum of the Atlantic

The Fisheries Museum of the Atlantic is a museum in Lunenburg, Nova Scotia, Canada, operating seasonally from mid-May through mid-October. The museum commemorates the fishing heritage of the Atlantic coast of Canada. Housed in brightly painted red buildings, with floating vessels at wharfside, the Museum offers a host of attractions, a maritime gift shop and restaurant.

Retired fishermen and experienced "Heritage Interpreters" accentuate the experience of visiting the museum. Entertaining activities and demonstrations take place daily from mid-May to mid-October.

The Fisheries Museum of the Atlantic is operated by the volunteer Board of Directors of the Lunenburg Marine Museum Society, for the Nova Scotia Museum.

== See also ==
- List of museums in Nova Scotia
