= Outlaw (bull) =

Canadian bucking bull

Outlaw #C-71 (1997–2004) was a Canadian bucking bull. He is perhaps the most famous rodeo bull to come from Canada. He was a red-and-white speckled Brahma-Longhorn cross. He weighed over 816 kilograms (1,800 pounds) and had 40-centimetre (16-inch) horns.

Outlaw was born in 1997 and was raised by Clark Jackson in his ranch near Minburn, Alberta. During his early career, he was used in the Lakeland College Rodeo club at the campus in Vermilion, Alberta. He was sold to the Calgary Stampede in 1999. During his professional career, Outlaw competed in the Canadian Professional Rodeo Association (CPRA), Professional Rodeo Cowboys Association (PRCA), and Professional Bull Riders (PBR). He was named Bull of the Canadian Finals Rodeo (CFR) in 2002 and Bull of the Calgary Stampede in 2003. He was bucked 71 times and only successfully ridden once for the full eight seconds by Justin Volz for 93 points at the 2003 Calgary Stampede.

Outlaw made history on July 9, 2004, on the first day of that year's Calgary Stampede, when he blasted out of the bucking chute and triggered the famed closing bell at the New York Stock Exchange, becoming the first animal to ever close that financial market, as well as being the first time the bell had ever been rung outside the United States. One month later, in August 2004, Outlaw died at age seven while fighting another bull. He was buried at the Calgary Stampede Ranch near Hanna, Alberta. His offspring continue his legacy.

On May 27, 2010, Outlaw was posthumously honoured with a heroic-sized bronze statue made by Regina-based artist Richard Loffler outside the Stock Exchange Tower in Calgary. He was also posthumously featured on the poster for the 2010 Calgary Stampede.
