= Sylvia Grinnell Territorial Park =

Territorial park in Nunavut, Canada

- Iqaluit Kuunga(a)
- IUCN category V (protected landscape/seascape)
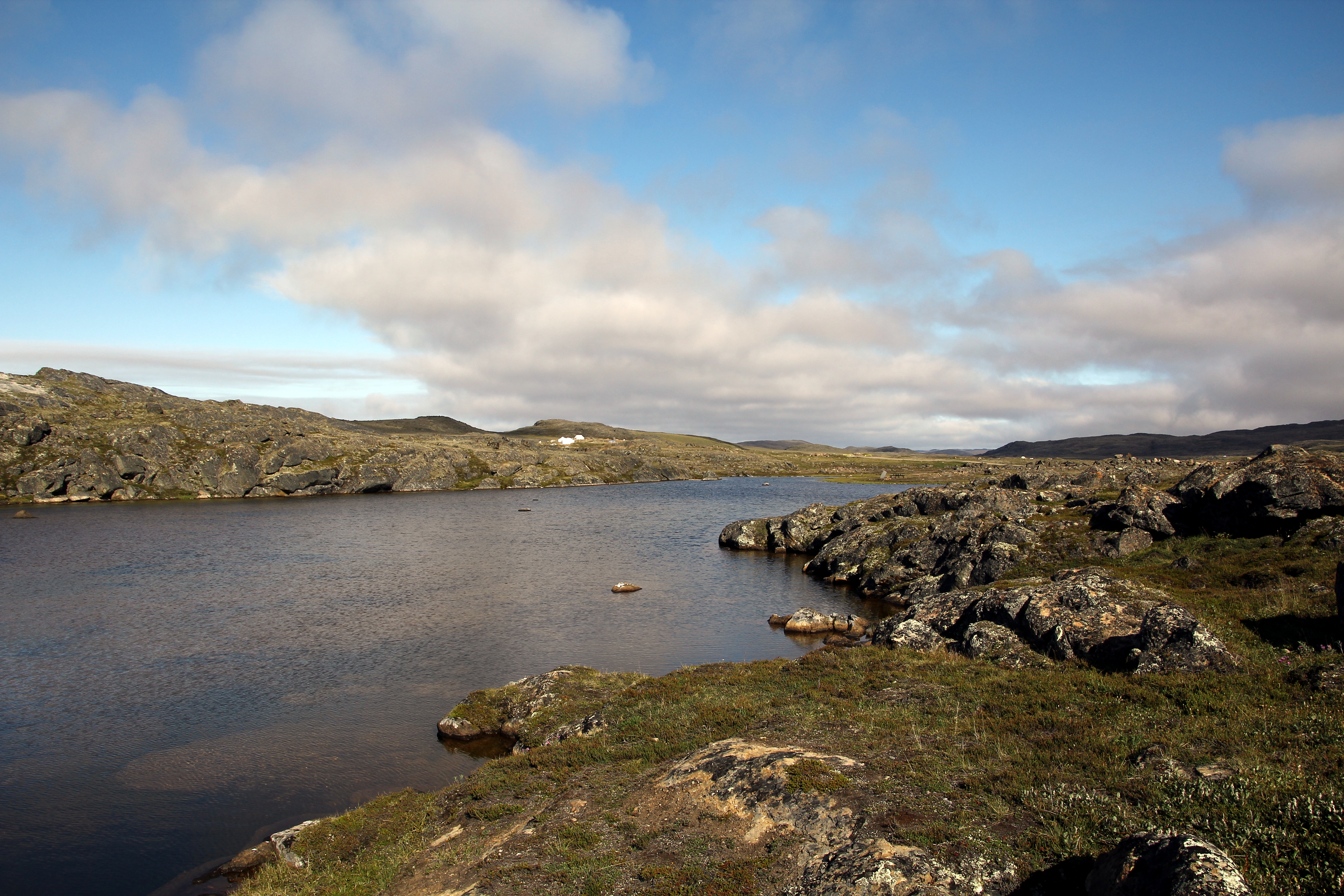
- The Sylvia Grinnell river in the park

- Location within Nunavut Location within Canada
- Location: Nunavut, Canada
- Nearest city: Iqaluit
- Coordinates: 63°44′55″N 68°33′50″W
- Area: 44.3 km^{2} (17.1 sq mi)
- Governing body: Nunavut Parks & Special Places, Government of Nunavut

Sylvia Grinnell Territorial Park (known as Iqaluit Kuunga(a) in Inuktitut, ᐃᖃᓗᐃᑦ ᑰᖓ ᒥᕐᖑᐃᖅᓯᕐᕕᒃ in Inuktitut syllabics) is a Canadian territorial park on Baffin Island in the territory of Nunavut.

== Location and access ==
The park is located 1 km (0.62 mi) away from Iqaluit, the capital of Nunavut territory, to the west. From the centre of Iqaluit it is an easy 30-minute walk. There are cabs available in Iqaluit as well.

== Area ==
The park covers 148 ha (370 acres).

== History ==
In 1861, American explorer Charles Francis Hall became the first non-indigenous person to journey to the area, when he reached the place with Inuit help. He became the first non-indigenous person to realize that Frobisher Bay was a bay and not a north-west passage route to China as was believed. He went on to name many places in the area after his financial backers. The lake and river were all named for Sylvia Grinnell, the daughter of his friend and benefactor Henry Grinnell. The river lends its name to the park. Iqaluit in Inuktitut means 'place of many fish' a reference to the Arctic char which thrives in the river. The Inuktitut for the park is Iqaluit Kuunga(a) which means Iqaluit river. The park's landscape was formed by ice age glaciation 7100 years ago.

== Sights ==
The Sylvia Grinnell River (64°44′N 68°34′W) flows through the park from Sylvia Grinnell Lake (64°10′N 69°25′W) into Peterhead Inlet (63°45′N 68°39′W). A viewing platform 55 m (180 ft) above the falls offers an impressive view.

The park also has archaeological sites of the Dorset culture and the Thule people. Stone cairns and Thule ruins can be seen in the park.

== Fauna and flora ==
Caribou is the most important animal seen in the park as it forms a major component of traditional and current Inuit cuisine. Arctic fox, Arctic hare and polar bear are also seen in the park. The park is also home to around 40 avian species in the summer and spring seasons. They include gyrfalcon, common ringed plover, American golden plover, horned lark, rock ptarmigan, snow bunting, semipalmated sandpiper, red-throated loon, Lapland longspur, northern wheatear and peregrine falcon. Commercial fishery for Arctic char in the river was banned in 1965. Presently, a permit is required to fish in the river for non-Inuit. One of the most common plants in the park is purple mountain saxifrage, the official flower of Nunavut.

=== Climate ===
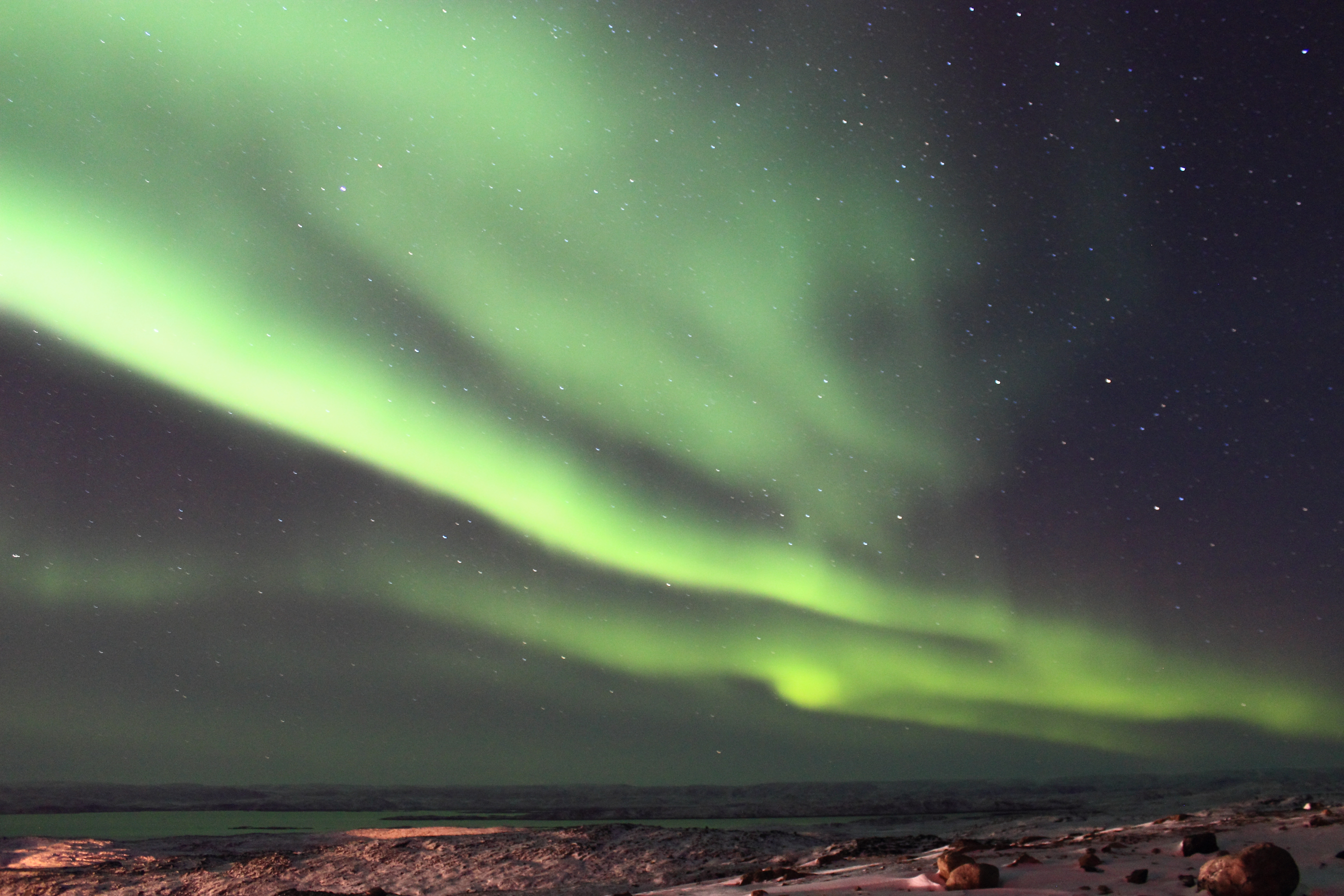
The area has a tundra climate, featuring long, cold winters, and brief summers that are too cool to permit the growth of large trees.

The area has a tundra climate (Köppen: ET, Trewartha: Ftkd) typical of the Arctic region, although it is well outside the Arctic Circle. The city features long, cold winters and brief, cool summers. Average monthly temperatures are below freezing for eight months of the year. Iqaluit averages just over 400 mm (16 in) of precipitation annually, much wetter than many other localities in the Arctic Archipelago, with the summer being the wettest season. Temperatures of the winter months are comparable to other northern communities further west on the continent such as Yellowknife and to some extent even Fairbanks, Alaska, even though the area is a few degrees colder than the latter. Summer temperatures are, however, much colder due to its easterly maritime position affected by the waters of the cold Baffin Island Current. This means that the tree line is much further south in the eastern part of Canada, being as southbound, in spite of low elevation, as northern Labrador.

Although it is north of the natural tree line, there are some short, south-facing imported black spruce (Picea mariana) specimens protected by snowdrifts in the winter, in addition to a few shrubs, which are woody plants. These include the Arctic willow (Salix arctica). The Arctic willow may be up to around 7.6 m (25 ft) horizontally, but only 150 mm (6 in) tall.

The climate of area is also colder than Gulf Stream locations on the same latitude. For example, the Norwegian city of Trondheim has an annual mean temperature that is 15.2 °C (27.4 °F) milder.

The lowest temperature ever recorded at Iqaluit was −45.6 °C (−50.1 °F) on 10 February 1967. The highest temperature ever recorded in Iqaluit was 26.8 °C (80.2 °F) on 21 July 2008.

The climate is changing in the region. In 1979, the mean temperature was −9.0 °C (15.8 °F), but in 2023, it was −6.8 °C (19.8 °F). Furthermore, during the first 23 years of that period, there were 14 years which displayed a negative temperature anomaly and 9 which displayed a positive one, whereas in the second 23 years, there were only 3 negative and 20 positive temperature anomaly years.

Climate is from Iqaluit Airport approximately 1 km (0.62 mi) northeast.

Climate data for Iqaluit (Iqaluit Airport) WMO ID: 71909; coordinates 63°45′N 68°33′W; elevation: 33.5 m (110 ft); 1991–2020 normals, extremes 1946–present
Month	Jan	Feb	Mar	Apr	May	Jun	Jul	Aug	Sep	Oct	Nov	Dec	Year
Record high humidex	3.3	5.2	4.3	6.8	13.3	21.7	27.8	27.6	18.8	8.6	4.8	3.4	27.8
Record high °C (°F)	3.9 (39.0)	5.7 (42.3)	4.2 (39.6)	7.2 (45.0)	13.3 (55.9)	22.7 (72.9)	26.8 (80.2)	25.5 (77.9)	18.4 (65.1)	9.1 (48.4)	5.6 (42.1)	3.8 (38.8)	26.8 (80.2)
Mean daily maximum °C (°F)	−22.0 (−7.6)	−22.9 (−9.2)	−17.6 (0.3)	−8.9 (16.0)	−0.3 (31.5)	7.0 (44.6)	12.0 (53.6)	11.1 (52.0)	5.6 (42.1)	−0.5 (31.1)	−7.5 (18.5)	−14.7 (5.5)	−4.9 (23.2)
Daily mean °C (°F)	−26.0 (−14.8)	−27.0 (−16.6)	−22.4 (−8.3)	−13.5 (7.7)	−3.2 (26.2)	3.9 (39.0)	8.1 (46.6)	7.5 (45.5)	2.9 (37.2)	−3.2 (26.2)	−11.1 (12.0)	−18.9 (−2.0)	−8.6 (16.5)
Mean daily minimum °C (°F)	−29.9 (−21.8)	−31.0 (−23.8)	−27.2 (−17.0)	−18.1 (−0.6)	−6.1 (21.0)	0.7 (33.3)	4.2 (39.6)	3.8 (38.8)	0.2 (32.4)	−5.8 (21.6)	−14.7 (5.5)	−23.0 (−9.4)	−12.2 (10.0)
Record low °C (°F)	−45.0 (−49.0)	−49.0 (−56.2)	−44.7 (−48.5)	−34.2 (−29.6)	−26.1 (−15.0)	−10.2 (13.6)	−2.8 (27.0)	−2.5 (27.5)	−12.8 (9.0)	−27.1 (−16.8)	−36.2 (−33.2)	−43.4 (−46.1)	−49.0 (−56.2)
Record low wind chill	−65.5	−66.4	−62.1	−53.1	−36.0	−18.8	−7.2	−8.6	−18.6	−42.9	−56.8	−60.1	−66.4
Average precipitation mm (inches)	16.3 (0.64)	14.0 (0.55)	21.4 (0.84)	22.7 (0.89)	21.0 (0.83)	48.7 (1.92)	39.8 (1.57)	61.7 (2.43)	50.8 (2.00)	30.2 (1.19)	18.5 (0.73)	16.2 (0.64)	361.2 (14.22)
Average rainfall mm (inches)	0.4 (0.02)	0.1 (0.00)	0.0 (0.0)	0.0 (0.0)	3.3 (0.13)	46.1 (1.81)	44.4 (1.75)	65.5 (2.58)	43.9 (1.73)	12.3 (0.48)	0.7 (0.03)	0.0 (0.0)	216.6 (8.53)
Average snowfall cm (inches)	19.4 (7.6)	15.1 (5.9)	20.6 (8.1)	23.8 (9.4)	23.0 (9.1)	3.8 (1.5)	0.0 (0.0)	0.1 (0.0)	8.5 (3.3)	21.1 (8.3)	25.9 (10.2)	28.8 (11.3)	190.0 (74.8)
Average precipitation days (≥ 0.2 mm)	12.1	10.7	12.4	12.8	10.6	12.3	12.4	14.3	15.7	13.2	12.5	12.8	151.5
Average rainy days (≥ 0.2 mm)	0.06	0.06	0.06	0.06	1.7	10.7	13.1	14.8	13.2	3.8	0.24	0.0	57.7
Average snowy days (≥ 0.2 cm)	10.1	8.8	8.7	9.6	8.7	2.1	0.06	0.12	3.7	9.8	11.9	12.7	86.3
Average relative humidity (%) (at 1500 LST)	68.1	67.6	68.9	74.6	77.3	74.6	72.9	73.5	75.2	78.7	78.4	74.3	73.7
Mean monthly sunshine hours	32.4	94.0	172.2	216.5	180.5	200.2	236.8	156.8	87.9	51.4	35.6	12.6	1,476.8
Percentage possible sunshine	18.5	39.0	47.4	48.2	31.9	32.5	39.3	31.0	22.4	16.8	17.7	8.9	29.5
Average ultraviolet index	0	0	1	2	4	4	4	3	2	1	0	0	2
Source: Environment and Climate Change Canada (sunshine 1981–2010 from ECCC) (ultraviolet index from Weather Atlas)

== Tourism ==
There are various hiking routes varying in difficulty and length with trail markers through the park. Sylvia Grinnell River is a popular spot for fishing but for tourists a license is necessary. Camping in the park is possible, and near the riverbank there are plateaus providing shelter for campers.

== Gallery ==
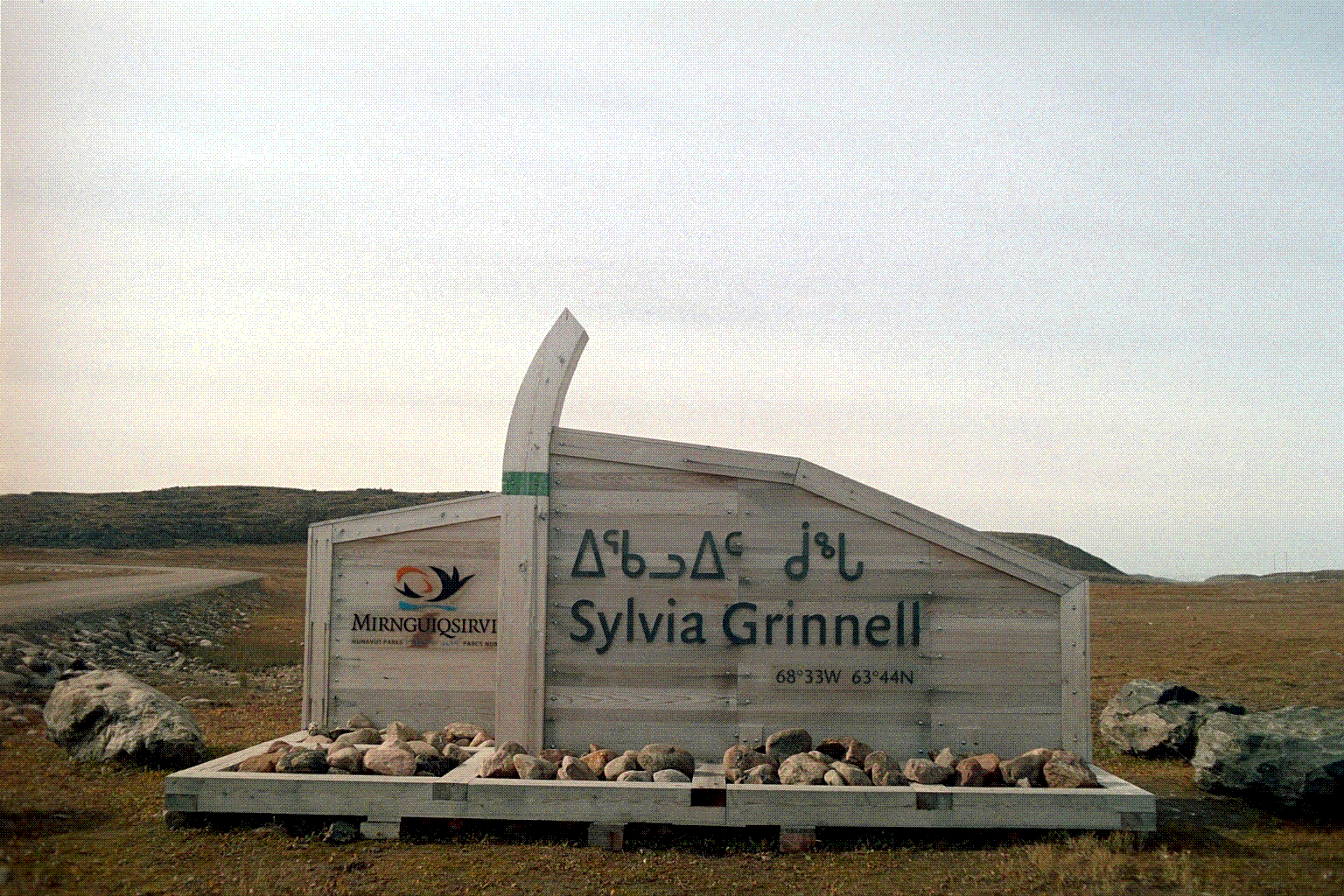
Entrance to the park

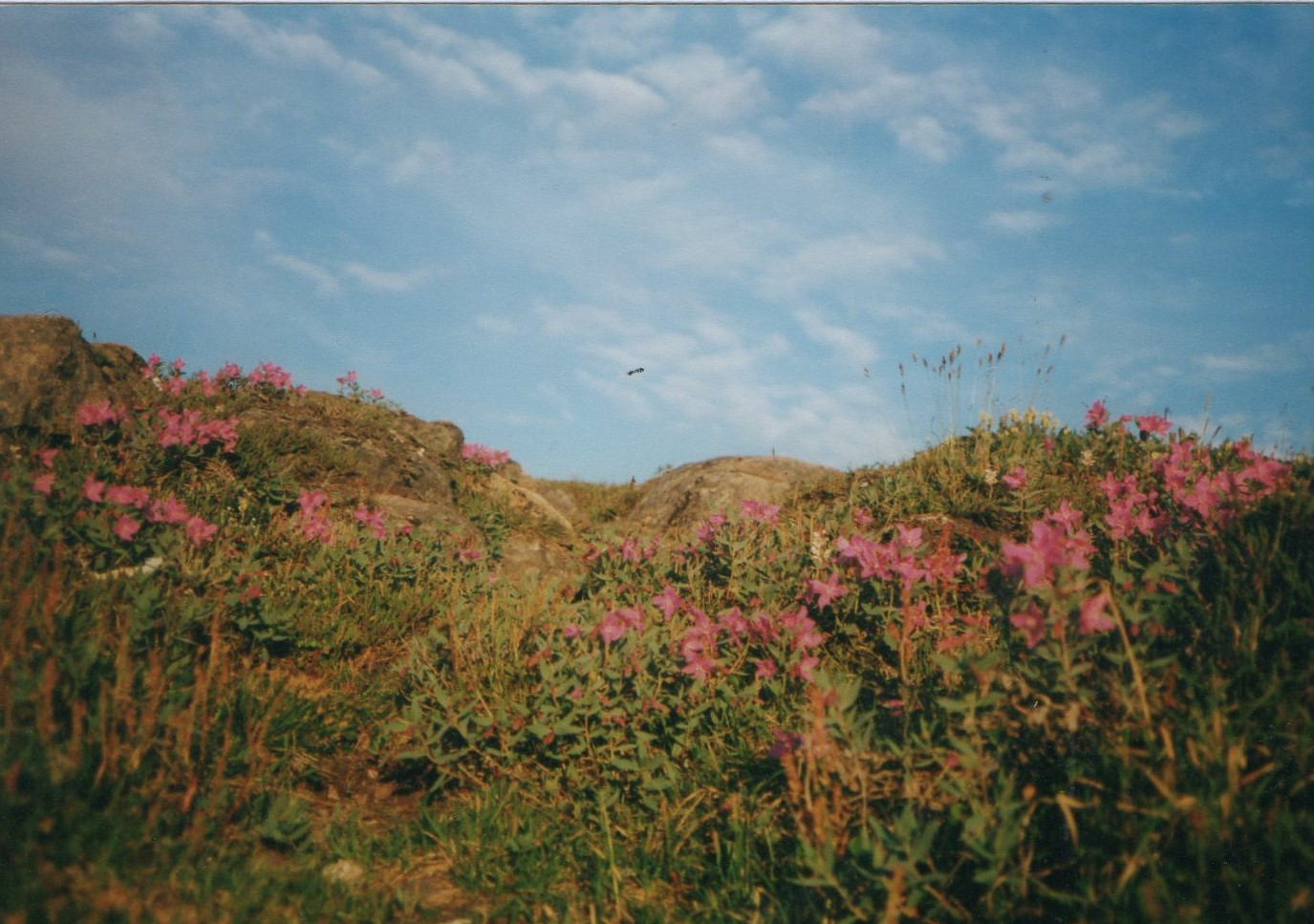
Purple mountain saxifrage in the park

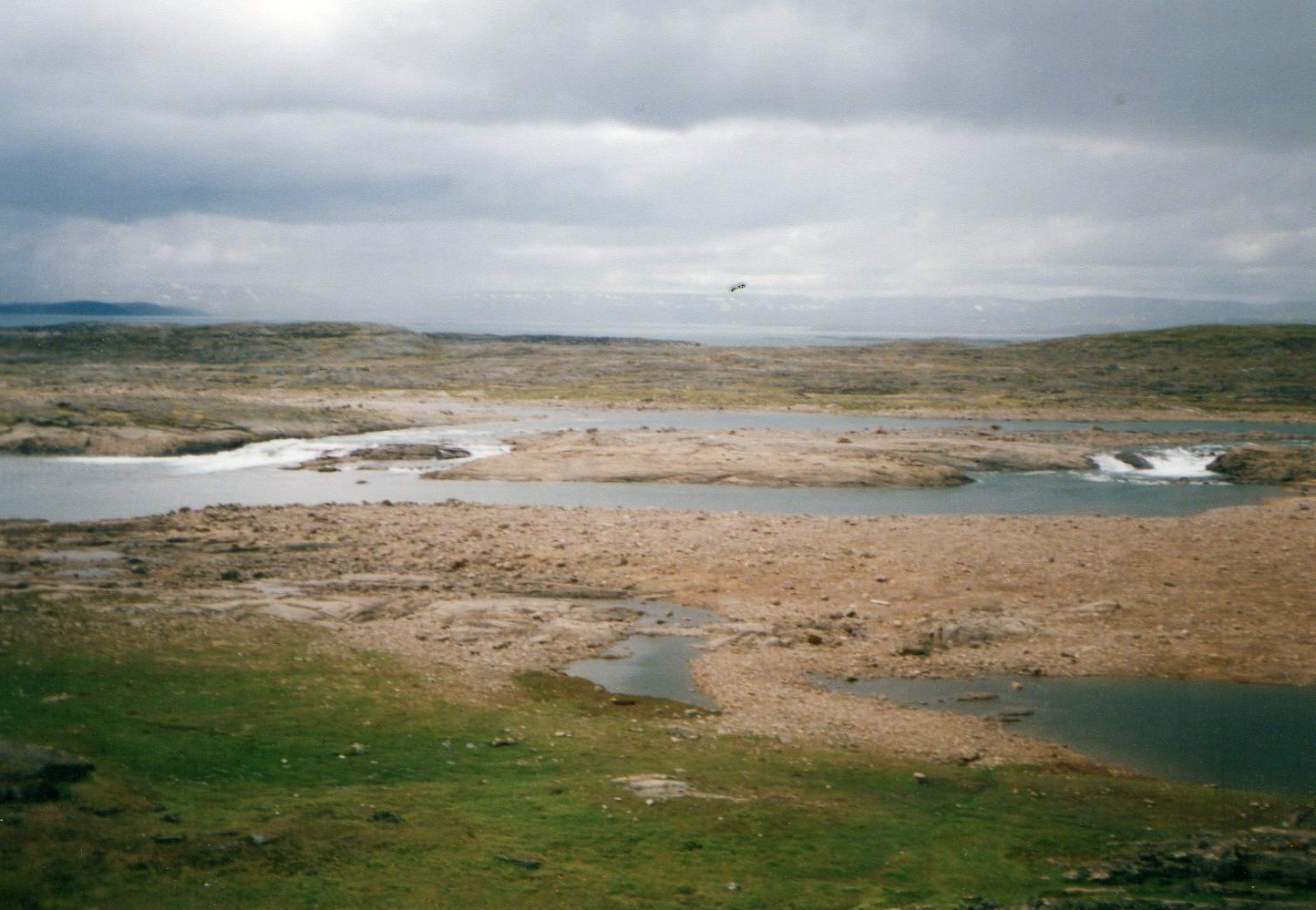
Sylvia Grinnell River

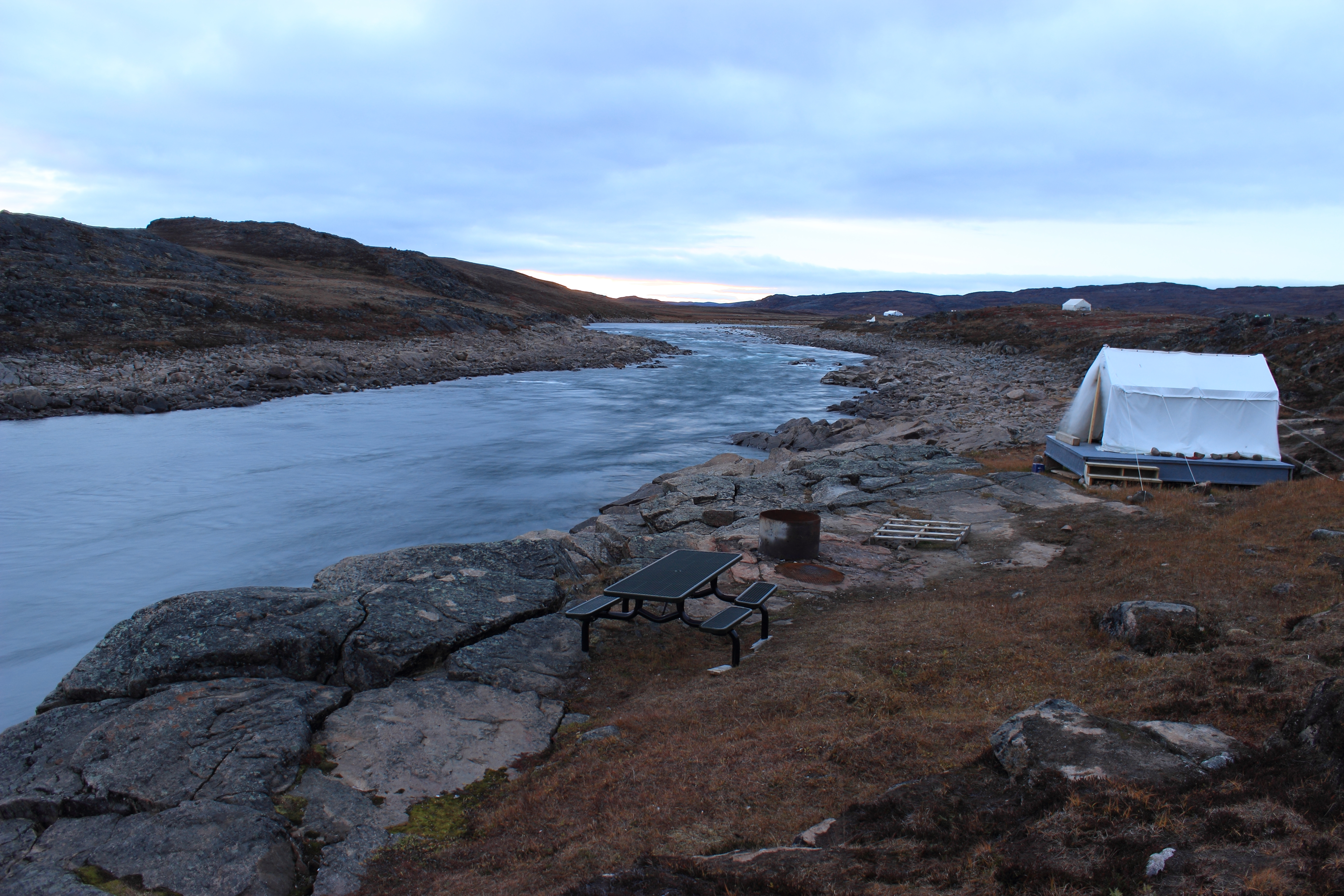
Sylvia Grinnell River
