= Stuart Park, British Columbia =

Coordinates: 49.888°N 119.497°W

Stuart Park is a park located near Okanagan Lake in Kelowna, British Columbia, Canada.

In 2015, the Canadian Institute of Planners named it the greatest public space in Canada.

== Seasonal Operation ==
=== Summer ===
During the summer months, concrete surface functions as an open public plaza. The space is used for community events, public gatherings, performances, and recreational activities in downtown Kelowna.

The City of Kelowna regularly programs the plaza with seasonal events and activities, including outdoor fitness classes, live entertainment, markets, and family-oriented programming. In recent years, the city has also hosted roller skating events at Stuart Park in partnership with local skating organizations including organized Roller Nights and roller skate rental programs.

=== Winter ===
During the winter season, the central plaza at Stuart Park is converted into a public outdoor skating rink. The rink operates daily throughout the winter season, weather and maintenance permitting, and offers free public skating with skate rentals available on site.

The outdoor rink opened as part of the Stuart Park redevelopment project completed in 2010. Since opening, it has become a prominent winter recreation facility in downtown Kelowna and attracts both residents and visitors.

Unlike a natural ice surface, the rink uses a mechanically refrigerated system to maintain skating conditions during periods of mild winter weather. A network of underground piping beneath the concrete slab circulates coolant through the skating surface, allowing the ice to be maintained even when ambient temperatures rise above freezing. According to the City of Kelowna's rink operators, refrigerant and glycol are pumped from equipment located at City Hall through underground infrastructure connected to the rink.

==== What do I need to do before skating at Stuart Park? ====
The rink is open for drop-in use. No reservations are needed to skate in the park. It is recommended to check the live cam before heading down to the rink. Rentals for skates and bars are available on-site. For added COVID-19 Safety, please bring your own protective gear such as helmets, hand sanitizer, and face coverings. Rentals are open from 11 am to 8 pm daily, depending on the weather. If the temperature is below -10°C, the rental shop will be closed.

Skate Rental Prices
Rents	Price
Kids Skates	$4.00
Adult Skates	$5.00
Helmets	$2.00
E-Z Bars	$2.00
