= Gardiner Island (Nunavut) =

Island in Nunavut, Canada

- Location within Nunavut Location within Canada

Geography
- Location: Frobisher Bay
- Coordinates: 63.458°N 68.383°W
- Archipelago: Arctic Archipelago

Administration
- Canada
- Nunavut: Nunavut
- Region: Qikiqtaaluk

Demographics
- Population: Uninhabited

Gardiner Island is one of the many uninhabited Canadian arctic islands in Qikiqtaaluk Region, Nunavut. It is a Baffin Island offshore island located in Frobisher Bay south of the capital city of Iqaluit.

Other islands in the immediate vicinity include Algerine Island, Alligator Island, Anchorage Island, Aubrey Island, Beveridge Island, Camp Island, Coffin Island, Crimmins Island, Crowell Island, Dog Island, Emerick Island, Frobisher's Farthest, Kudlago Island, Kungo Island, Jenvey Island, Low Island, Luella Island, Mark Island, Metela Island, Mitchell Island, Pichit Island, Pink Lady Island, Ptarmigan Island, Quadrifid Island, Sale Island, Sybil Island, and Thompson Island.
