= Algerine Island =

Island in Nunavut, Canada

- Location within Nunavut Location within Canada

Geography
- Location: Frobisher Bay
- Coordinates: 63°27′45″N 67°58′18″W
- Archipelago: Arctic Archipelago

Administration
- Canada
- Territory: Nunavut
- Region: Qikiqtaaluk

Demographics
- Population: Uninhabited

Algerine Island is one of the many uninhabited Canadian Arctic islands in the Qikiqtaaluk Region, Nunavut. It is a Baffin Island offshore island located in Frobisher Bay, southeast of the capital city of Iqaluit.

Other islands in the immediate vicinity include Alligator Island, Brigus Island, Camp Island, Crimmins Island, Culbertson Island, Frobisher's Farthest, Gay Island, Jenvey Island, Kudlago Island, Kungo Island, Low Island, Luella Island, Mark Island, McAllister Island, McBride Island, Metela Island, Mitchell Island, Pan Island, Peak Island, Pichit Island, Pink Lady Island, Precipice Island, Ptarmigan Island, Smith Island, and Sybil Island.
