= Aubrey Island =

Island in Canada

- Location within Nunavut Location within Canada

Geography
- Location: Frobisher Bay
- Coordinates: 63°30′00″N 068°31′48″W
- Archipelago: Arctic Archipelago

Administration
- Canada
- Territory: Nunavut
- Region: Qikiqtaaluk

Demographics
- Population: Uninhabited

Aubrey Island is one of the many uninhabited Canadian Arctic islands in the Qikiqtaaluk Region, Nunavut. It is a Baffin Island offshore island located in Frobisher Bay, southeast of the capital city of Iqaluit.

Other islands in the immediate vicinity include Anchorage Island, Beveridge Island, Bishop Island, Cairn Island, Coffin Island, Crimmins Island, Emerick Island, Faris Island, Gardiner Island, Hill Island, Jenvey Island, Kudlago Island, Long Island, Luella Island, Mair Island, McLaren Island, Monument Island, Pichit Island, Pink Lady Island, Ptarmigan Island, Sale Island, Sybil Island, and Thompson Island.
