= Long Island (Frobisher Bay, Nunavut) =

Island in Qikiqtaaluk Region, Nunavut, Canada

- Location within Nunavut Location within Canada

Geography
- Location: Frobisher Bay
- Coordinates: 63°43′N 68°30′W
- Archipelago: Arctic Archipelago

Administration
- Canada
- Nunavut: Nunavut
- Region: Qikiqtaaluk

Demographics
- Population: Uninhabited

Long Island is one of the many uninhabited Canadian arctic islands in Qikiqtaaluk Region, Nunavut. It is a Baffin Island offshore island located in Frobisher Bay, approximately 4 km (2.5 mi) south of the capital city of Iqaluit.

Other islands in the immediate vicinity include Aubrey Island, Beveridge Island, Bishop Island, Cairn Island, Coffin Island, Crimmins Island, Emerick Island, Faris Island, Hill Island, Jenvey Island, Kudlago Island, Mair Island, McLaren Island, Monument Island, Pichit Island, Ptarmigan Island, Qarsau Island, Sale Island, Sybil Island, and Thompson Island.
