= Alligator Island =

Island in Nunavut, Canada

- Location within Nunavut Location within Canada

Geography
- Location: Frobisher Bay
- Coordinates: 63°26′45″N 68°00′25″W
- Archipelago: Arctic Archipelago

Administration
- Canada
- Territory: Nunavut
- Region: Qikiqtaaluk

Demographics
- Population: Uninhabited

Alligator Island is one of the many uninhabited Canadian Arctic islands in the Qikiqtaaluk Region, Nunavut. It is a Baffin Island offshore island located in Frobisher Bay, southeast of the capital city of Iqaluit. Other islands in the immediate vicinity include Algerine Island, Camp Island, Culbertson Island, Frobisher's Farthest, Low Island, Mark Island, McAllister Island, McBride Island, Metela Island, Mitchell Island, Pan Island, Peak Island, Pink Lady Island, Precipice Island.
