= Faris Island =

Island in Nunavut, Canada

Ferris Island
- Location within Nunavut Location within Canada

Geography
- Location: Frobisher Bay
- Coordinates: 63°36′N 68°44′W
- Archipelago: Arctic Archipelago
- Area: 11 km^{2} (4.2 sq mi)

Administration
- Canada
- Nunavut: Nunavut
- Region: Qikiqtaaluk

Demographics
- Population: Uninhabited

Faris Island (alternate: Ferris Island) is one of the many uninhabited Canadian arctic islands in Qikiqtaaluk Region, Nunavut. It is a Baffin Island offshore island located in Frobisher Bay, approximately 14 km (8.7 mi) southwest of the capital city of Iqaluit.

Other islands in the immediate vicinity include Aubrey Island, Beveridge Island, Bishop Island, Cairn Island, Coffin Island, Crimmins Island, Emerick Island, Gardiner Island, Hill Island, Kudlago Island, Long Island, Mair Island, McLaren Island, Monument Island, Ptarmigan Island, Qarsau Island, Sale Island, Sybil Island, and Thompson Island.
