= Jenvey Island =

Island in Nunavut, Canada

- Location within Nunavut Location within Canada

Geography
- Location: Frobisher Bay
- Coordinates: 63°35′30″N 68°8′42″W
- Archipelago: Arctic Archipelago

Administration
- Canada
- Nunavut: Nunavut
- Region: Qikiqtaaluk

Demographics
- Population: Uninhabited

Jenvey Island is one of the many uninhabited Canadian arctic islands in Qikiqtaaluk Region, Nunavut. It is a Baffin Island offshore island located in Frobisher Bay, southeast of the capital city of Iqaluit.

Other islands in the immediate vicinity include Algerine Island, Alligator Island, Aubrey Island, Cairn Island, Coffin Island, Crimmins Island, Frobisher's Farthest, Gardiner Island, Kudlago Island, Mair Island, McBride Island, McLaren Island, Mitchell Island, Pan Island, Pichit Island, Pink Lady Island, Ptarmigan Island, Sale Island, Sybil Island, and Thompson Island.
