= Augustus Island =

Island in Nunavut, Canada

- Location within Nunavut Location within Canada

Geography
- Location: Frobisher Bay
- Coordinates: 63°34′48″N 067°40′48″W
- Archipelago: Arctic Archipelago

Administration
- Canada
- Territory: Nunavut
- Region: Qikiqtaaluk

Demographics
- Population: Uninhabited

Augustus Island is one of the many uninhabited Canadian Arctic islands in the Qikiqtaaluk Region, Nunavut. It is a Baffin Island offshore island located in inner Frobisher Bay. The island lies at the head of Ward Inlet, between Becher Peninsula and Hall Peninsula. Bruce Island is located at the mouth of the inlet. Other islands in the immediate vicinity include Algerine Island, Frobisher's Farthest, McBride Island, and Pichit Island.

The island was named by American Arctic explorer Charles Francis Hall.
