= Ward Inlet =

Body of water in Qikiqtaaluk, Nunavut, Canada

Ward Inlet (63°30′N 067°35′W) is a body of water in Nunavut's Qikiqtaaluk Region. It lies in eastern Frobisher Bay, forming a wedge into Baffin Island, separating Becher Peninsula from Hall Peninsula. Augustus Island lies deep into the inlet.

Ward inlet was the site of the Hudson's Bay Company's south Baffin operations until 1949 when they moved to Apex to take advantage of Frobisher Bay Air Force Base located nearby.
