= Mary Island (Nunavut) =

Uninhabited island in the Canadian Arctic

- Location within Nunavut Location within Canada

Geography
- Location: Frobisher Bay
- Coordinates: 63°23′24″N 67°36′00″W
- Archipelago: Arctic Archipelago

Administration
- Canada
- Nunavut: Nunavut
- Region: Qikiqtaaluk

Demographics
- Population: Uninhabited
- Ethnic groups: Inuit

Mary Island is one of the many uninhabited Canadian arctic islands in Qikiqtaaluk Region, Nunavut. It is a Baffin Island offshore island located in Frobisher Bay, southeast of Iqaluit. Other islands in the immediate vicinity include Bruce Island, Gay Island, Ogden Island, Peak Island, and Pope Island.
