= Lefferts Island =

Uninhabited island in the Canadian Arctic

- Location within Nunavut Location within Canada

Geography
- Location: Frobisher Bay
- Coordinates: 62°30′N 65°03′W
- Archipelago: Arctic Archipelago

Administration
- Canada
- Nunavut: Nunavut
- Region: Qikiqtaaluk

Demographics
- Population: Uninhabited

Lefferts Island (also known as: Lefert Island, Leferts Island, Leffert Island, or Lefters Island) is a Baffin Island offshore island located in the Arctic Archipelago in the territory of Nunavut. The island lies in Frobisher Bay between Beare Sound and Lupton Channel. Other islands also in the immediate vicinity of the tip of Hall Peninsula include the Harper Islands, Bear Island, Little Hall Island, and Hudson Island.
