= Harper Islands =

Island group in Nunavut, Canada

Geography
- Location: Frobisher Bay
- Coordinates: 62°20′59″N 064°40′00″W
- Archipelago: Arctic Archipelago

Administration
- Canada
- Nunavut: Nunavut
- Region: Qikiqtaaluk

Demographics
- Population: Uninhabited
- Source: Harper Islands at the Atlas of Canada

Harper Islands is a small uninhabited island group with an area of 8 km^{2} (3.1 sq mi), which is part of the Baffin Island group located in the Arctic Archipelago in the territory of Nunavut. The group lies at the confluence of Frobisher Bay and the Labrador Sea. Other islands also in the immediate vicinity of the tip of Hall Peninsula, but further north, include Lefferts, Bear, Little Hall, and Hudson islands.
