= Bear Island (Nunavut) =

Island in Qikiqtaaluk Region, Nunavut, Canada

- Location within Nunavut Location within Canada

Geography
- Location: Frobisher Bay
- Coordinates: 62°27′N 64°17′W
- Archipelago: Arctic Archipelago

Administration
- Canada
- Territory: Nunavut
- Region: Qikiqtaaluk

Demographics
- Population: Uninhabited

Bear Island is an uninhabited island offshore of Baffin Island in the Qikiqtaaluk Region, Nunavut, Canada. The island lies in the Labrador Sea a few kilometres north of its confluence with Frobisher Bay. Other islands in the immediate vicinity of the tip of Hall Peninsula include the Harper Islands, Lefferts Island, Little Hall Island, and Hudson Island.
