= Nouyarn Island =

Island in Nunavut, Canada

- Location within Nunavut Location within Canada

Geography
- Location: Frobisher Bay
- Coordinates: 62°55′N 066°04′W
- Archipelago: Arctic Archipelago

Administration
- Canada
- Nunavut: Nunavut
- Region: Qikiqtaaluk

Demographics
- Population: Uninhabited

Nouyarn Island is an uninhabited Baffin Island offshore island located in the Arctic Archipelago in the territory of Nunavut. The island lies in Frobisher Bay, southeast of Hamlen Bay, and south of the Hall Peninsula tip. Islands in the immediate vicinity include Gabriel Island and McLean Island to the west, as well as Chase Island to the northwest.
