= McBride Island =

Island in Nunavut, Canada

- Location within Nunavut Location within Canada

Geography
- Location: Frobisher Bay
- Coordinates: 63°30′07″N 67°53′49″W
- Archipelago: Arctic Archipelago

Administration
- Canada
- Nunavut: Nunavut
- Region: Qikiqtaaluk

Demographics
- Population: Uninhabited

McBride Island is one of the many uninhabited Canadian arctic islands in Qikiqtaaluk Region, Nunavut. It is a Baffin Island offshore island located in Frobisher Bay, southeast of Iqaluit. Other islands in the immediate vicinity include Algerine Island, Alligator Island, Frobisher's Farthest, Mitchell Island, Pan Island, and Pink Lady Island.
