= Field Island =

Island in Nunavut, Canada

- Location within Nunavut Location within Canada

Geography
- Location: Frobisher Bay
- Coordinates: 63°13′N 67°3′W
- Archipelago: Arctic Archipelago

Administration
- Canada
- Nunavut: Nunavut
- Region: Qikiqtaaluk

Demographics
- Population: Uninhabited

Field Island is a Baffin Island offshore island located in the Arctic Archipelago in the territory of Nunavut. The island lies in Frobisher Bay, west of Waddell Bay, and southeast of Opera Glass Cape on the Hall Peninsula. Islands in the immediate vicinity include: Bruce Island to the northwest, Fletcher Island to the west, and Chase Island to the south.
