= Whiskukun Island =

Island in Nunavut, Canada

- Location within Nunavut Location within Canada

Geography
- Location: Frobisher Bay
- Coordinates: 63°12′25″N 68°02′15″W
- Archipelago: Arctic Archipelago

Administration
- Canada
- Nunavut: Nunavut
- Region: Qikiqtaaluk

Demographics
- Population: Uninhabited
- Source: Whiskukun Island at Atlas of Canada

Whiskukun Island is one of the many uninhabited Canadian arctic islands in Qikiqtaaluk Region, Nunavut. It is a Baffin Island offshore island located in Frobisher Bay, southeast of Iqaluit. Other islands in the immediate vicinity include Nest Island, Pike Island, Pugh Island, Resor Island, and Wedge Island.

Whiskukun Channel is located at 63°13′23″N 68°04′00″W.
