= Wiswell (disambiguation) =

Wiswell can refer to:

== Places ==
- Wiswell, a village and civil parish in Lancashire, England
- Wiswell, Kentucky, an unincorporated community in Calloway County

== People ==
- Andrew P. Wiswell (1852–1906), American justice
- John Wiswell, American author
- Rebecca Wiswell (1806-1897), American nurse

== Other uses ==
- Listed buildings in Wiswell, Lancashire
- Wiswell Inlet, Nunavut, Canada
