= Mark Island =

Mark Island may refer to:

- Mark Island (Frobisher Bay, Nunavut)
- Mark Island (Hudson Strait, Nunavut)

== See also ==
- Little Mark Island, northern Casco Bay, Maine, location of the Little Mark Island Monument
