= Falk Island =

Island in Nunavut, Canada

- Location within Nunavut Location within Canada

Geography
- Location: Frobisher Bay
- Coordinates: 63.27°N 67.83°W
- Archipelago: Arctic Archipelago

Administration
- Canada
- Nunavut: Nunavut
- Region: Qikiqtaaluk

Demographics
- Population: Uninhabited

Falk Island is one of the many uninhabited Canadian arctic islands in Qikiqtaaluk Region, Nunavut. It is a Baffin Island located in Frobisher Bay, southeast of Iqaluit. Other islands in the immediate vicinity include Brook Island, Brigus Island, Fletcher Island, Gay Island, and Smith Island.
