= Sabine Bay (Baffin Island) =

Bay in Qikiqtaaluk Region, Nunavut, Canada

- Location within Nunavut
- Location: Baffin Island
- Coordinates: 62°40′N 65°19′W
- Ocean/sea sources: Arctic Ocean
- Basin countries: Canada
- Settlements: Uninhabited

Sabine Bay is an Arctic waterway in the Qikiqtaaluk Region, Nunavut, Canada. The bay flows into Frobisher Bay off Baffin Island.
