= Mary Island =

Mary Island may refer to:

- Mary Island (Nunavut) in the Canadian Arctic 63.38°N 67.61°W
- Kanton Island, Kiribati 02°48′38″S 171°40′32″W
- Mary Island (Western Australia) 13°59′49″S 126°22′47″E
- Mary Island (Parry Sound) 45°22′41.2″N 80°04′50.2″W
