= Bruce Island (Nunavut) =

Island in Nunavut, Canada

- Location within Nunavut Location within Canada

Geography
- Location: Frobisher Bay
- Coordinates: 63°19′N 67°27′W
- Archipelago: Arctic Archipelago
- Area: 11 km^{2} (4.2 sq mi)
- Coastline: 23 km (14.3 mi)

Administration
- Canada
- Territory: Nunavut
- Region: Qikiqtaaluk

Demographics
- Population: Uninhabited
- Source: Bruce Island at the Atlas of Canada

Bruce Island is a Baffin Island offshore island located in the Arctic Archipelago in the territory of Nunavut. The island lies in Frobisher Bay, south of Ward Inlet.

Becher Peninsula is to the northwest, while Hall Peninsula is to the east. Islands in the immediate vicinity include: Field Island and Chase Island to the southeast; Fletcher, Pike, and Pugh Islands to the west.
