= McLean Island (Nunavut) =

Island in Nunavut, Canada

- Location within Nunavut Location within Canada

Geography
- Location: Frobisher Bay
- Coordinates: 62°53′55″N 66°38′10″W
- Archipelago: Arctic Archipelago

Administration
- Canada
- Nunavut: Nunavut
- Region: Qikiqtaaluk

Demographics
- Population: Uninhabited

McLean Island is an uninhabited Baffin Island offshore island located in the Arctic Archipelago in the territory of Nunavut. The island lies in Frobisher Bay, southwest of Hamlen Bay and the Hall Peninsula. Islands in the immediate vicinity include Gabriel Island and Nouyarn Island to the east, and Chase Island to the northwest.
