= Hudson Island (Nunavut) =

Island in Nunavut, Canada

- Location within Nunavut Location within Canada

Geography
- Location: Labrador Sea
- Coordinates: 62°32′N 64°18′W
- Archipelago: Arctic Archipelago

Administration
- Canada
- Nunavut: Nunavut
- Region: Qikiqtaaluk

Demographics
- Population: Uninhabited
- Source: Hudson Island at Atlas of Canada

Hudson Island, measuring 13 km^{2} (5.0 sq mi) in area, is a Baffin Island offshore island located in the Arctic Archipelago in the territory of Nunavut. The uninhabited island lies in the Labrador Sea, east of Lupton Channel. Other islands also in the immediate vicinity of Blunt Peninsula (the tip of Hall Peninsula) include the Harper Islands, Lefferts Island, Bear Island, and Little Hall Island.
