= Wiswell Inlet =

Wiswell Inlet (62°55′N 065°45′W) is a body of water in Nunavut's Qikiqtaaluk Region in Canada. It lies in eastern Frobisher Bay, forming a wedge into Baffin Island's Blunt Peninsula. There are several islands at the mouth of the inlet.
