= Bruce Island =

Bruce Island may refer to:

- Bruce Island (Antarctica), an island in the Gerlache Strait, Antarctica
- Bruce Island (Franz Josef Land), an island in Franz Josef Land, Russia
- Bruce Island (Nunavut), a Baffin Island offshore island located in the Arctic Archipelago in the territory of Nunavut
