= Redan (disambiguation) =

Redan is a fortification work in a V-shaped salient angled toward an expected attack

Redan may also refer to:

== Places ==
- Redan, Georgia, a town in the United States
  - Redan High School
- Redan Island, Canada
- Redan, Ontario
- Redan, Victoria, a suburb of Ballarat, Australia
- A hamlet in Inkerman, Renfrewshire
- A community in Elizabethtown-Kitley, Ontario Township in Ontario, Canada

== Surname ==
- Iwan Redan (born 1980), Dutch footballer
- Daishawn Redan (born 2001), Dutch footballer

== Other ==
- Redan hole, a golf hole with a sloping, "v" shaped green, named after the fortification
