= Gabriel Island =

Island in Nunavut, Canada

- Location within Nunavut Location within Canada

Geography
- Location: Frobisher Bay
- Coordinates: 62°52′N 66°27′W
- Archipelago: Arctic Archipelago

Administration
- Canada
- Nunavut: Nunavut
- Region: Qikiqtaaluk

Demographics
- Population: Uninhabited

Gabriel Island is a Baffin Island offshore island located in the Arctic Archipelago in the territory of Nunavut. The island lies in Frobisher Bay, south of Hamlen Bay, and southwest of the Hall Peninsula. Islands in the immediate vicinity include Nouyarn Island to the east, McLean Island to the west, and Chase Island to the northwest.
