= Apex, Iqaluit =

Neighbourhood of Iqaluit, Nunavut, Canada

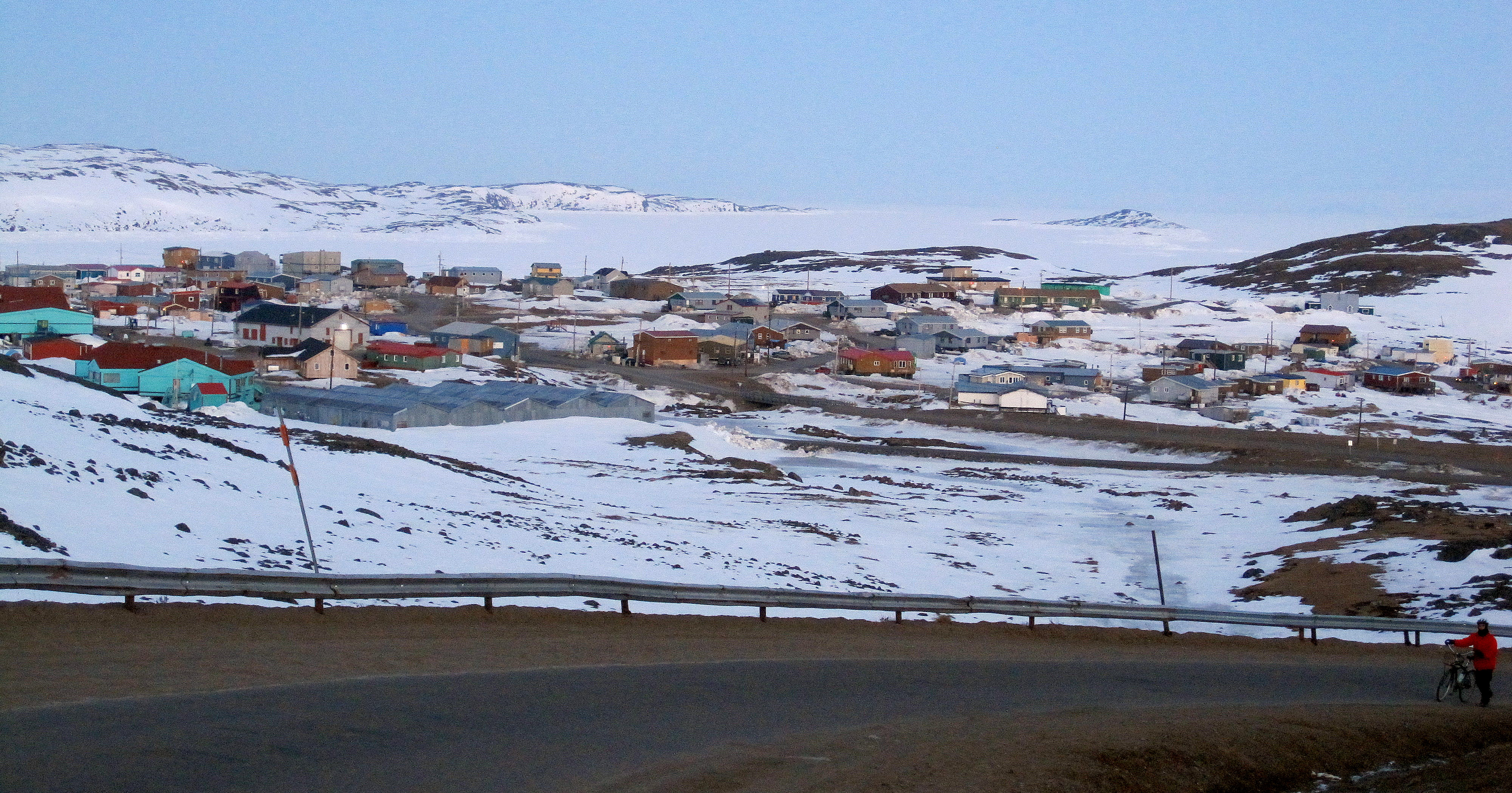
View of Apex from the Road to Apex

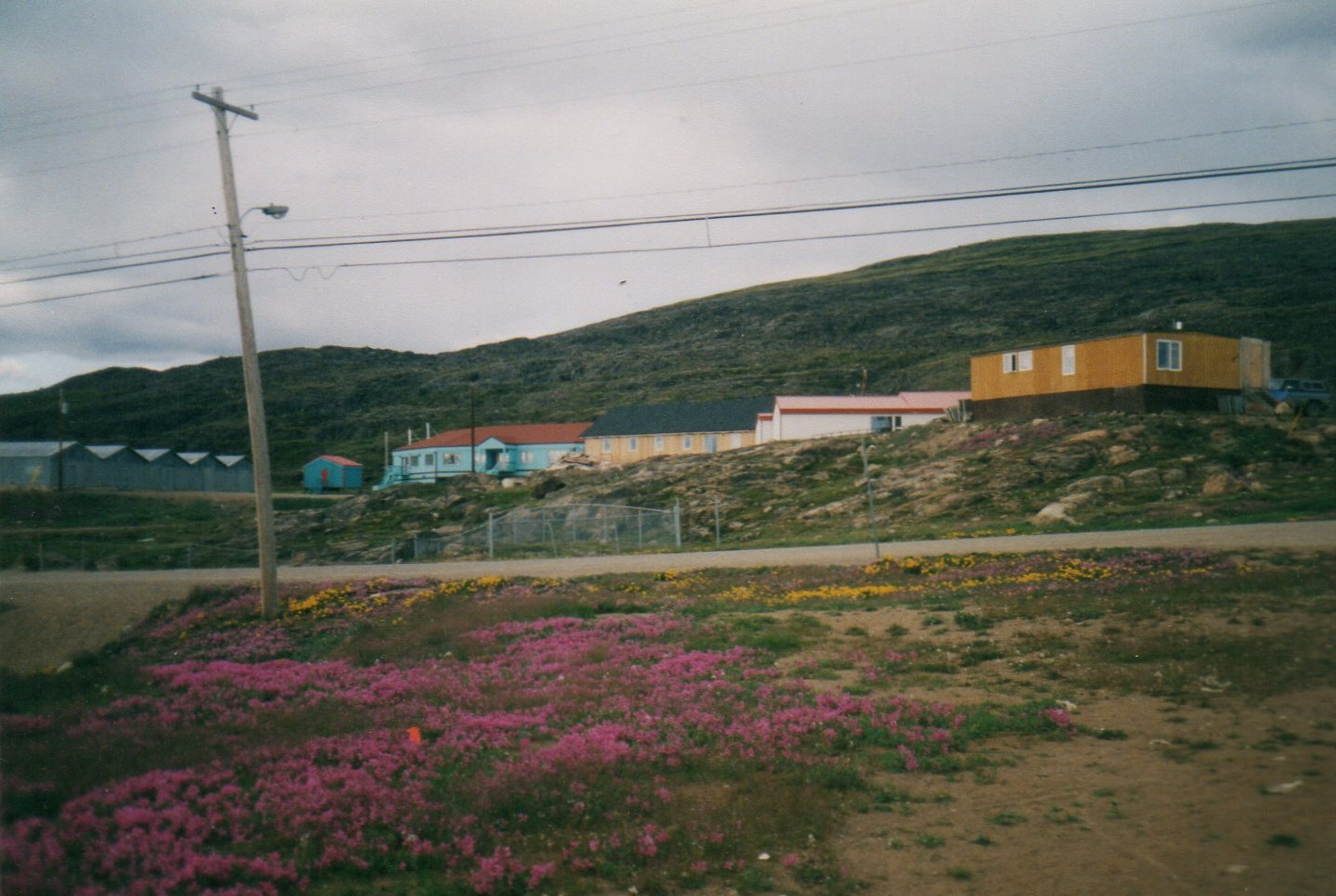
Community centre

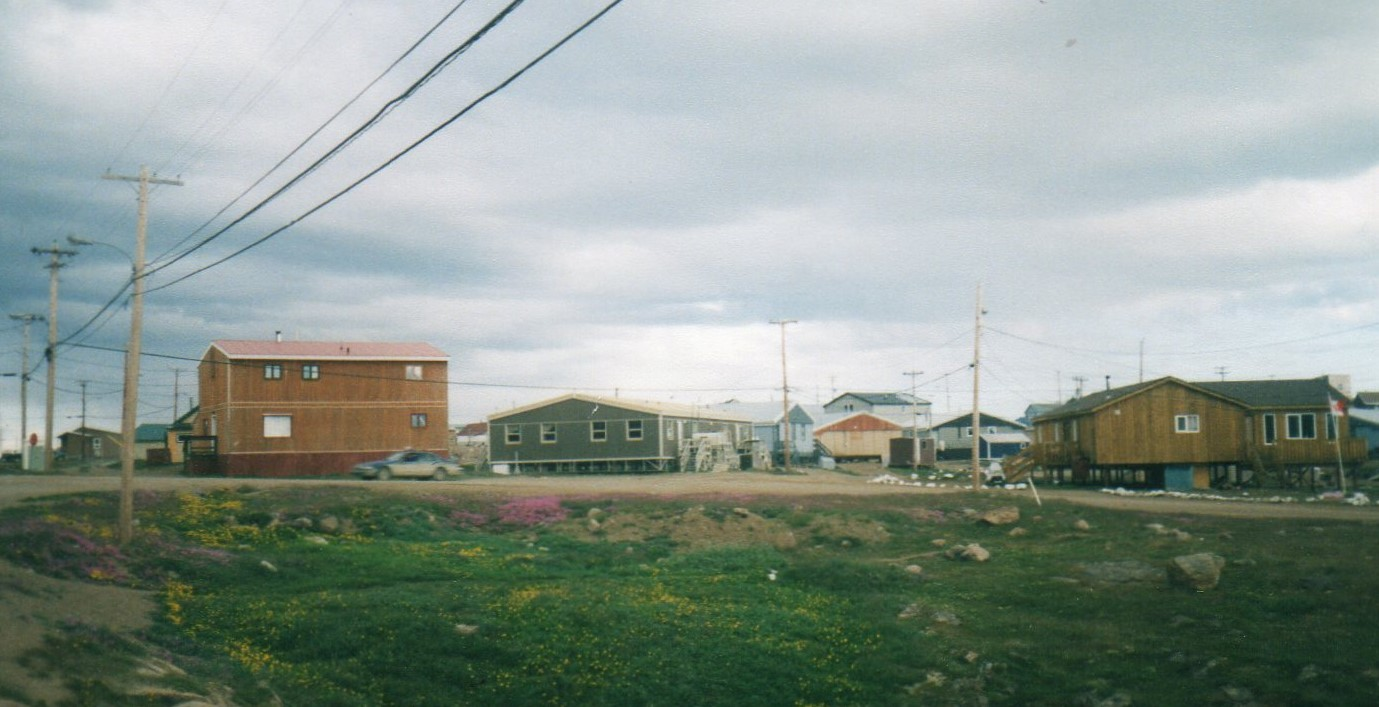
Community centre

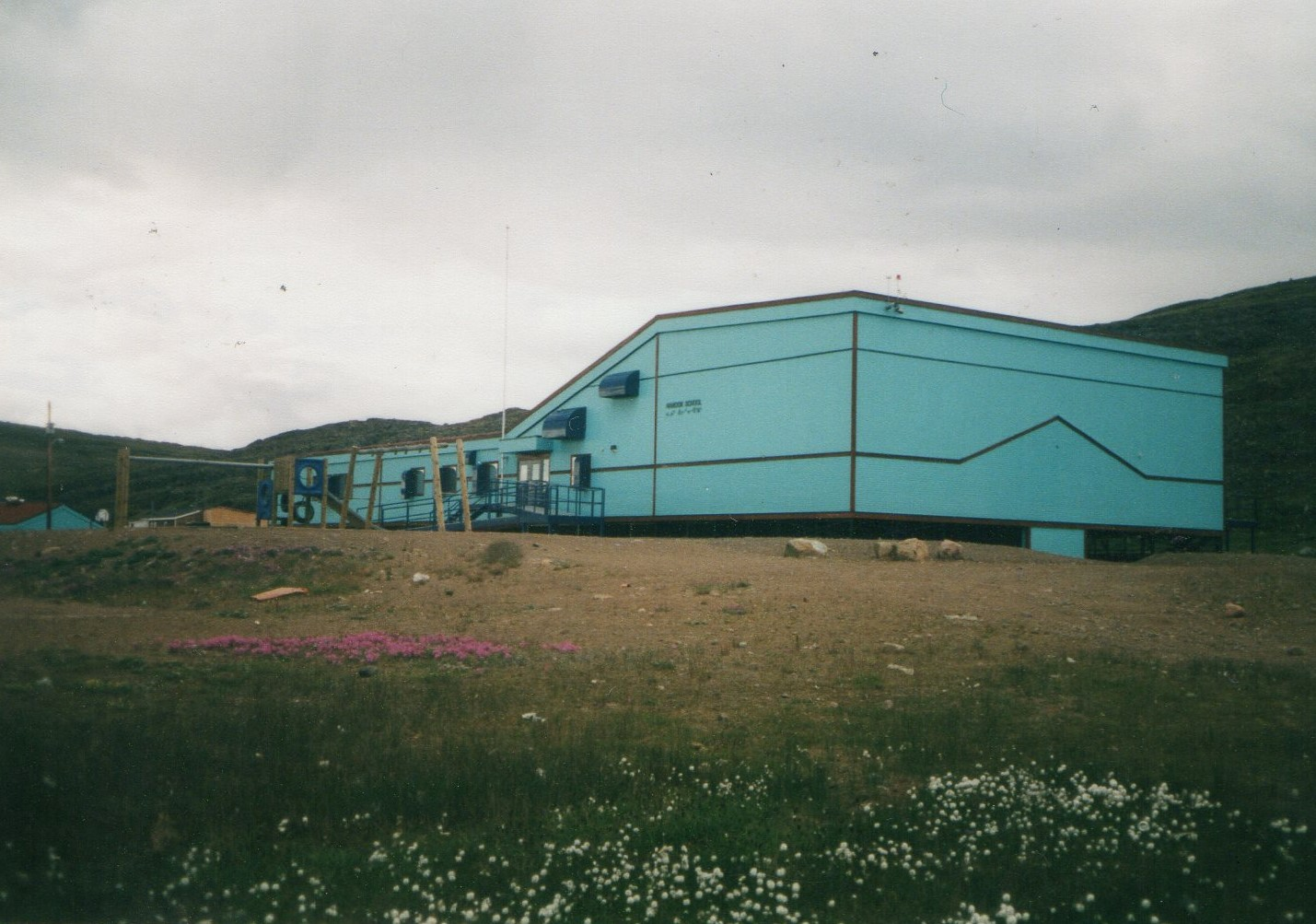
Nanook Elementary School

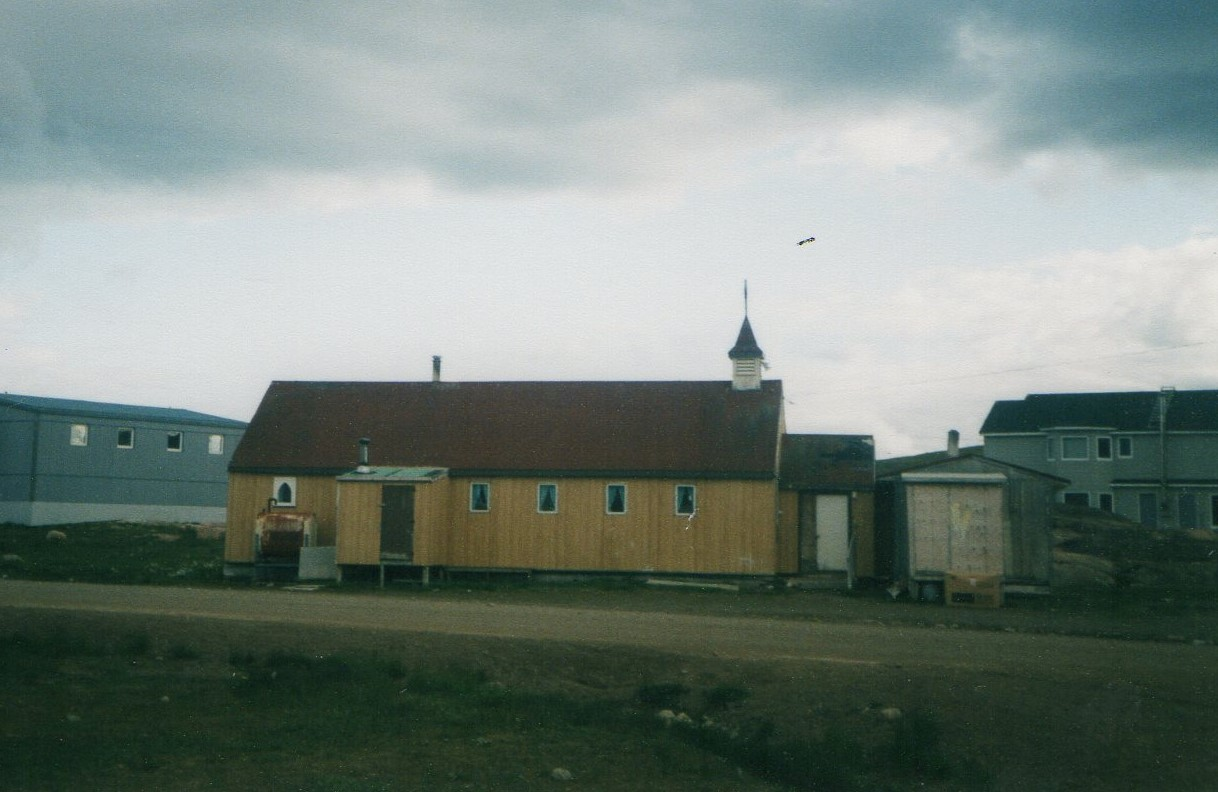
St. Simon's Anglican Church

Apex (Inuktitut Niaqunngut) is a small community outside Iqaluit located on Baffin Island in Nunavut, Canada. It is about 5 km (3.1 mi) southeast of Iqaluit on a small peninsula separating Koojesse (Kuujussi) Inlet from Tarr Inlet. Historically Apex was the place where most Inuit lived when Iqaluit was a military site and was off-limits to anyone not working at the base. The community is accessed by bridge or causeway, and bordered by a local creek (kuujuusi) and waterfall (kugluktuk). Located here are the women's shelter, a church, Nanook Elementary School, and a bed-and-breakfast, along with housing for about 60 families.

The beach at Apex stands in for Ice Cove and is a location for the television series North of North. A fly-over of the Apex is seen in the première and during several episodes.

Officially and functionally part of the City of Iqaluit, some Apex residents tend to reject affiliation with "Frobisher Bay". At the 2006 Nunavut Electoral Boundaries Commission hearings, and in the resulting final report, community members asked for territorial representation with the south Baffin community of Kimmirut, rather than continue with parts of the existing Iqaluit ridings. The Deputy-Mayor of Iqaluit has the additional portfolio of representing and responding to interests from the Apex citizenry.

== History ==
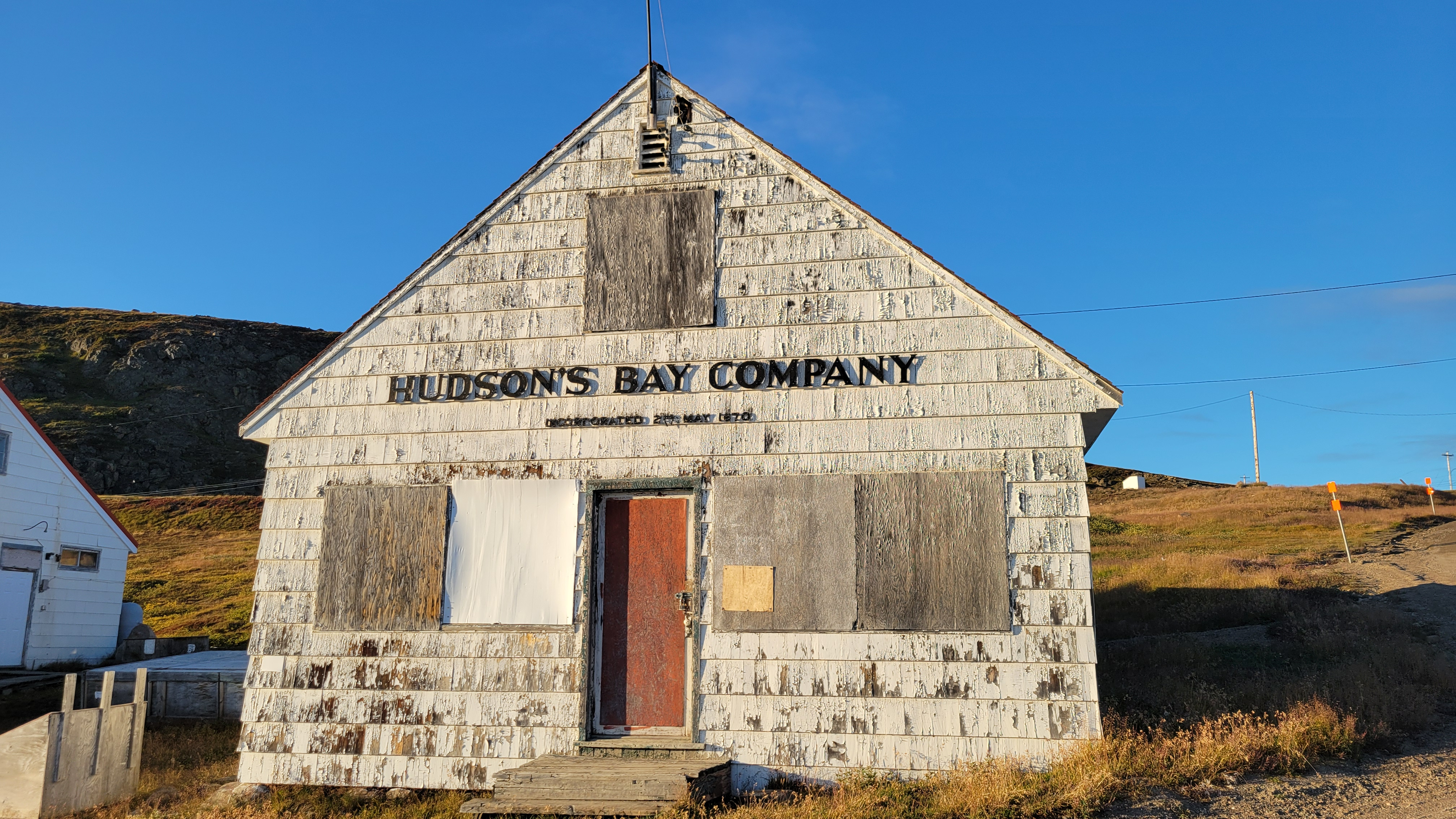
Former Hudson's Bay Company store in Apex

The community got its start in 1949 when the Hudson's Bay Company moved its south Baffin operations from Ward Inlet to the Apex Beach location to take advantage of the increased activity near the new US Air Force Base and landing strip. In the 1950s the community contained a number of administrative buildings for the Department of Northern Health and Welfare, as well as Inuit housing units, a public laundry and bath house and the original nursing station for the Baffin region. This latter facility acted as a marshalling and drop-off point for treatment in tuberculosis hospitals. A monument to Inuit who went south as tuberculosis patients, and did not return, was commissioned by Pairijait Tigumivik, (the Iqaluit Elders' Society) and is located in front of the nursing station on the bank of the creek. Small holes in the monument act as a 'prayer wall' designed to permit the insertion of messages for departed relatives.

The Inuit housing units which grew up in Apex were either in the single room "match-box" style with a pinched waist (1960s), or the 512 (named for the square footage of this housing model). The original Apex families, (including the Michael, Alainga, Peter, Joamie, Onalik and Timotee families) built these houses from standard packages supplied by government. There was also a small cannery for Arctic char, promoted by the Department of Fisheries and Oceans. The cannery encouraged fishing at levels which led to the demise of the Iqaluit Sylvia Grinnell River fish stocks, which are only now (~2008) showing signs of a recovery to levels which would substantiate the name "Iqaluit" for this region.

During the times of Commissioner of the Northwest Territories, Stu Hodgson, and his successor John H. Parker, residents of Apex were advised that the community was inefficient and no longer required. Plans were made for it to be "shut down" by government. A number of the Inuit housing units were moved to the airpost site at Frobisher Bay, including some which were relocated while their owners were away hunting. Government functions and employment gradually moved into the more "convenient" areas around the airport site, and the population of Apex declined. Municipal by-laws restricted new housing to existing residents until 1989, when construction was again permitted. The City of Iqaluit continues to prefer not to increase housing in Apex as it is serviced by more expensive "trucked water and sewer" systems.

Apex Hill has been used both as an alternate community name and as a geographic location for the hill on the east (seaward) side of the community which served as the apex (high point) for marine navigators entering Koojesse Inlet on the annual sealift and resupply.

St. Simon's Anglican Church, which was built in the 1960s, was the first Anglican church in the area.

== Climate ==
Apex, like Iqaluit, has a tundra climate (Köppen: ET) typical of the Arctic region, although it is well outside the Arctic Circle. The area features long, cold winters and brief, cool summers. Average monthly temperatures are below freezing for eight months of the year. Iqaluit averages just over 400 mm (16 in) of precipitation annually, much wetter than many other localities in the Arctic Archipelago, with the summer being the wettest season. Temperatures of the winter months are comparable to other northern communities further west on the continent such as Yellowknife and to some extent even Fairbanks, Alaska, even though Apex is a few degrees colder than the latter. Summer temperatures are, however, much colder due to its easterly maritime position affected by the waters of the cold Baffin Island Current. This means that the tree line is much further south in the eastern part of Canada, being as southbound, in spite of low elevation, as northern Labrador.

Although it is north of the natural tree line, there are some short, south-facing imported black spruce (Picea mariana) specimens protected by snowdrifts in the winter, in addition to a few shrubs, which are woody plants. These include the Arctic willow (Salix arctica), which is hard to recognize as a tree because of its low height. The Arctic willow may be up to around 7.6 m (25 ft) horizontally, but only 150 mm (6 in) tall.

The climate of Apex is also colder than Gulf Stream locations on the same latitude. For example, the Norwegian city of Trondheim has an annual mean temperature that is 15.2 °C (27.4 °F) milder.

The lowest temperature ever recorded was −45.6 °C (−50.1 °F) at the airport on 10 February 1967. The highest temperature ever recorded at the airport was 26.7 °C (80.1 °F) on 21 July 2008.

Climate data for Iqaluit (Iqaluit Airport) WMO ID: 71909; coordinates 63°45′N 68°33′W; elevation: 33.5 m (110 ft); 1991–2020 normals, extremes 1946–present
Month	Jan	Feb	Mar	Apr	May	Jun	Jul	Aug	Sep	Oct	Nov	Dec	Year
Record high humidex	3.3	5.2	4.3	6.8	13.3	21.7	27.8	27.6	18.8	8.6	4.8	3.4	27.8
Record high °C (°F)	3.9 (39.0)	5.7 (42.3)	4.2 (39.6)	7.2 (45.0)	13.3 (55.9)	22.7 (72.9)	26.8 (80.2)	25.5 (77.9)	18.4 (65.1)	9.1 (48.4)	5.6 (42.1)	3.8 (38.8)	26.8 (80.2)
Mean daily maximum °C (°F)	−22.0 (−7.6)	−22.9 (−9.2)	−17.6 (0.3)	−8.9 (16.0)	−0.3 (31.5)	7.0 (44.6)	12.0 (53.6)	11.1 (52.0)	5.6 (42.1)	−0.5 (31.1)	−7.5 (18.5)	−14.7 (5.5)	−4.9 (23.2)
Daily mean °C (°F)	−26.0 (−14.8)	−27.0 (−16.6)	−22.4 (−8.3)	−13.5 (7.7)	−3.2 (26.2)	3.9 (39.0)	8.1 (46.6)	7.5 (45.5)	2.9 (37.2)	−3.2 (26.2)	−11.1 (12.0)	−18.9 (−2.0)	−8.6 (16.5)
Mean daily minimum °C (°F)	−29.9 (−21.8)	−31.0 (−23.8)	−27.2 (−17.0)	−18.1 (−0.6)	−6.1 (21.0)	0.7 (33.3)	4.2 (39.6)	3.8 (38.8)	0.2 (32.4)	−5.8 (21.6)	−14.7 (5.5)	−23.0 (−9.4)	−12.2 (10.0)
Record low °C (°F)	−45.0 (−49.0)	−49.0 (−56.2)	−44.7 (−48.5)	−34.2 (−29.6)	−26.1 (−15.0)	−10.2 (13.6)	−2.8 (27.0)	−2.5 (27.5)	−12.8 (9.0)	−27.1 (−16.8)	−36.2 (−33.2)	−43.4 (−46.1)	−49.0 (−56.2)
Record low wind chill	−65.5	−66.4	−62.1	−53.1	−36.0	−18.8	−7.2	−8.6	−18.6	−42.9	−56.8	−60.1	−66.4
Average precipitation mm (inches)	16.3 (0.64)	14.0 (0.55)	21.4 (0.84)	22.7 (0.89)	21.0 (0.83)	48.7 (1.92)	39.8 (1.57)	61.7 (2.43)	50.8 (2.00)	30.2 (1.19)	18.5 (0.73)	16.2 (0.64)	361.2 (14.22)
Average rainfall mm (inches)	0.4 (0.02)	0.1 (0.00)	0.0 (0.0)	0.0 (0.0)	3.3 (0.13)	46.1 (1.81)	44.4 (1.75)	65.5 (2.58)	43.9 (1.73)	12.3 (0.48)	0.7 (0.03)	0.0 (0.0)	216.6 (8.53)
Average snowfall cm (inches)	19.4 (7.6)	15.1 (5.9)	20.6 (8.1)	23.8 (9.4)	23.0 (9.1)	3.8 (1.5)	0.0 (0.0)	0.1 (0.0)	8.5 (3.3)	21.1 (8.3)	25.9 (10.2)	28.8 (11.3)	190.0 (74.8)
Average precipitation days (≥ 0.2 mm)	12.1	10.7	12.4	12.8	10.6	12.3	12.4	14.3	15.7	13.2	12.5	12.8	151.5
Average rainy days (≥ 0.2 mm)	0.06	0.06	0.06	0.06	1.7	10.7	13.1	14.8	13.2	3.8	0.24	0.0	57.7
Average snowy days (≥ 0.2 cm)	10.1	8.8	8.7	9.6	8.7	2.1	0.06	0.12	3.7	9.8	11.9	12.7	86.3
Average relative humidity (%) (at 1500 LST)	68.1	67.6	68.9	74.6	77.3	74.6	72.9	73.5	75.2	78.7	78.4	74.3	73.7
Mean monthly sunshine hours	32.4	94.0	172.2	216.5	180.5	200.2	236.8	156.8	87.9	51.4	35.6	12.6	1,476.8
Percentage possible sunshine	18.5	39.0	47.4	48.2	31.9	32.5	39.3	31.0	22.4	16.8	17.7	8.9	29.5
Average ultraviolet index	0	0	1	2	4	4	4	3	2	1	0	0	2
Source: Environment and Climate Change Canada (sunshine 1981–2010 from ECCC) (ultraviolet index from Weather Atlas)
