= Blunt Peninsula =

Peninsula in Nunavut, Canada

Coordinates: 62°40′N 065°10′W

The Blunt Peninsula is a peninsula in the Canadian territory of Nunavut. It lies off the southeastern end of Baffin Island's Hall Peninsula. Across from the Blunt Peninsula are several large islands, including Loks Land Island, as well as hundreds of smaller islets and rocks. Frobisher Bay is located to the west, and the Labrador Sea is to the east.
