= Loks Land =

Uninhabited island in Nunavut, Canada

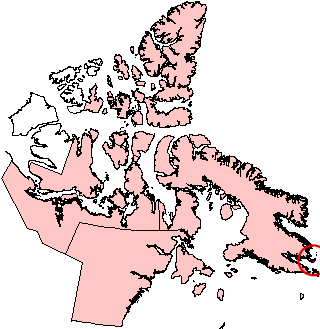
- Loks Land, Nunavut (red circle at right edge)

- Location within Nunavut Location within Canada

Geography
- Location: Frobisher Bay
- Coordinates: 62°26′N 64°38′W
- Archipelago: Arctic Archipelago
- Area: 419 km^{2} (162 sq mi)
- Coastline: 206 km (128 mi)

Administration
- Canada
- Territory: Nunavut
- Region: Qikiqtaaluk

Demographics
- Population: Uninhabited

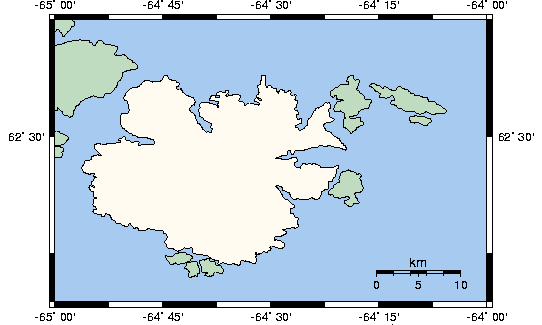
A closer view of the island

Loks Land is an uninhabited island in the Arctic Archipelago in Nunavut, Canada. It is located off the eastern tip of Baffin Island's Blunt Peninsula, close to the mouth of Frobisher Bay. It has an area of 419 km^{2} (162 sq mi) and a coastline of 206 km. The local Inuktitut name for the island is Takuligjuaq.

Loks Land was the site of one of the stations in the Distant Early Warning Line radar defence network, and had the code number BAF-4A.

The island was visited by Martin Frobisher and is named for Michael Lok, a London financier who was one of the patrons of Frobisher's Arctic expeditions of the 1570s. Frobisher's first expedition found ore which was purported to contain gold, leading to a second and third expedition which failed to find any of the precious metal. These later speculative ventures almost bankrupted Lok.
