= Chidliak Kimberlite Province =

Southern Baffin Island province

The Chidliak Kimberlite Province is located in the Hall Peninsula of southern Baffin Island, Nunavut, Canada. The first kimberlite there was discovered in July 2008 during exploration conducted by BHP Billiton and Peregrine Diamonds. By 2012, more than 60 kimberlites had been found, seven of which included some gem-quality diamonds. De Beers Group completed acquisition of Peregrine Diamonds in 2018.

The kimberlites at Chidliak are hosted in Archean metamorphic rocks. They occur both as pipes and as steeply dipping sheets that were emplaced between 138 and 156 million years ago.
