= Apex Hill =

Hill near Apex, Iqaluit

Coordinates: 63°44′01″N 068°27′34″W

Apex Hill is a hill in Qikiqtaaluk Region, Nunavut, Canada. It is located on Baffin Island, near the community of Apex, a suburb of Iqaluit.
