= Becher Peninsula =

Peninsula in Nunavut, Canada

Coordinates: 63°33′0″N 67°50′0″W

The Becher Peninsula is located on southern Baffin Island in the Canadian territory of Nunavut. It is a part of the larger Hall Peninsula. Becher Peninsula is bounded by Frobisher Bay to the west, and Ward Inlet to the east.
