= Chase Island =

Island in Nunavut, Canada

- Location within Nunavut Location within Canada

Geography
- Location: Frobisher Bay
- Coordinates: 63°03′N 66°55′W
- Archipelago: Arctic Archipelago

Administration
- Canada
- Nunavut: Nunavut
- Region: Qikiqtaaluk

Demographics
- Population: Uninhabited

Chase Island is a Baffin Island offshore island located in the Arctic Archipelago in the territory of Nunavut. The island lies in Frobisher Bay, west of Kneeland Bay, and southwest of Royer Cover on the Hall Peninsula. Islands in the immediate vicinity include: Gabriel Island and McLean Island to the southeast; and Field Island to the north.
