= Little Mark Island Monument =

- U.S. National Register of Historic Places
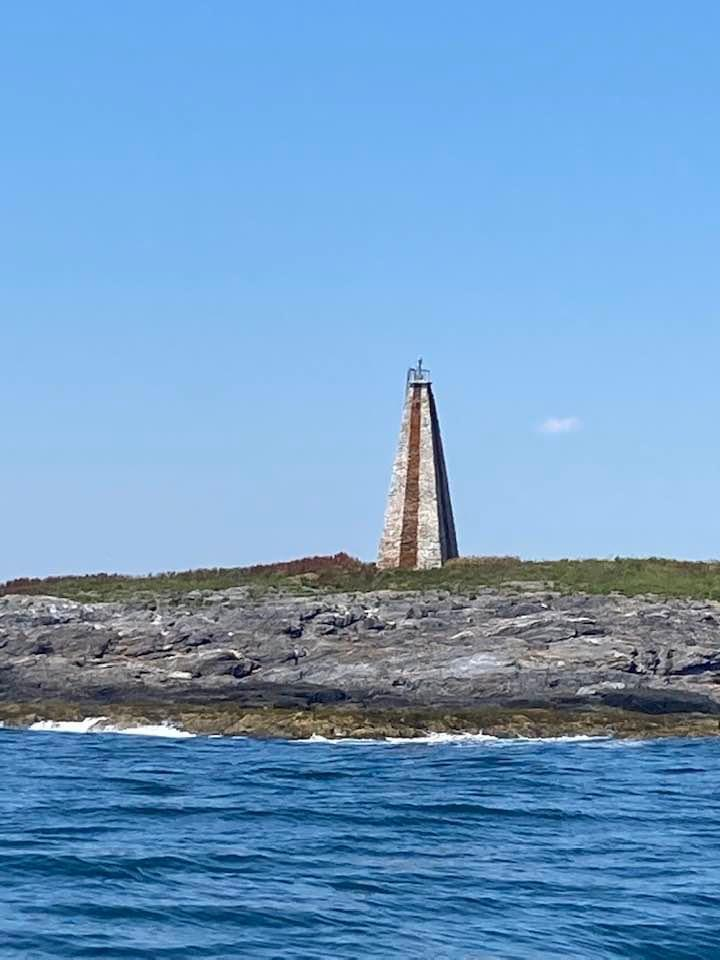

- Location within Maine Location within the United States
- Location: Casco Bay, 1.3 miles (2.1 km) southwest of Bailey Island, Harpswell, Maine
- Coordinates: 43°42′33″N 70°1′53″W
- Built: 1827
- NRHP reference No.: 16000338
- Added to NRHP: June 7, 2016

The Little Mark Island Monument is a historic day beacon and shipwreck refuge on Little Mark Island in northern Casco Bay off the southern coast of the United States state of Maine. The monument, a pyramidal stone structure built in 1827, is one of only three such structures ever built in the state, and is now topped by a beacon light. It is owned and managed by the United States Coast Guard, and is an active aid to navigation. It was listed on the National Register of Historic Places in 2016.

== Description and history ==
Little Mark Island is an island about 1 acre (0.40 ha) in size, and is located in northern Casco Bay, south of Haskell Island and west of the southern tip of Bailey Island. The island is roughly lozenge-shaped, and is devoid of trees. Its high point, near the center, rises to about 40 feet (12 m) above mean sea level, and is where the monument is located. The monument is a stone structure in the shape of a slender square pyramid, with a total height of 50 feet (15 m) and walls that are 18 feet (5.5 m) long at the base and 4 feet 6 inches (1.37 m) at the top. It appears to have been built from rock quarried on the island. The monument is marked with vertical black stripes on each face. A steel ladder is mounted on the south side, and the west side has an open entrance into the structure's interior. The interior consists of an open chamber which rises to the top of the monument, and was probably originally open at the top, intended to act as a chimney flue. The top has since been closed off by a concrete cap. The only fixtures in the interior are a box housing equipment for operating the marine beacon mounted on top of the concrete cap. The beacon is powered by batteries, which are recharged by solar panels mounted on a concrete pad just outside the monument.

The monument was built in 1827, and was a functional replica of a similar structure built in 1811 at Cape Elizabeth, a location now occupied by the Cape Elizabeth Lights. A similar monument was built on Stage Island in 1823 off Biddeford, which also serves today as an aid to navigation. When built, the interior would have been stocked with supplies usable by shipwreck victims who might seek refuge on the island. The light was installed on the tower in 1927. It is a white light, flashing for 0.4 seconds once every four seconds.

== See also ==
- National Register of Historic Places listings in Cumberland County, Maine
