= Rebecca Wiswell =

American nurse

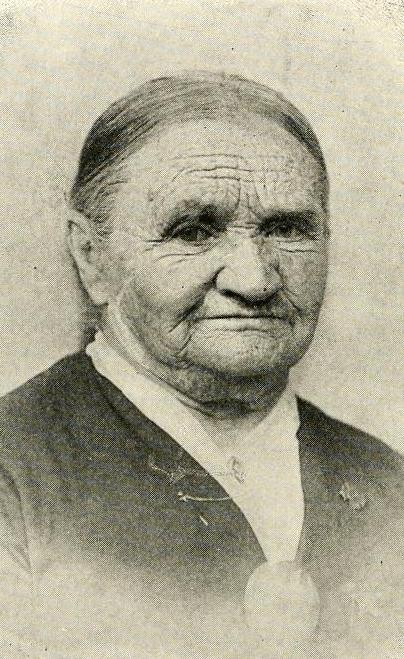
- Rebecca Wiswell, from an 1895 publication
- Born: September 24, 1806; Provincetown, Massachusetts, U.S.
- Died: October 29, 1897 (age 91); Plymouth, Massachusetts, U.S.
- Occupation: Nurse

Rebecca Wiswell (September 24, 1806 – October 29, 1897) was an American nurse who served under Dorothea Dix in the American Civil War.

== Early life and education ==
Wiswell was born in Provincetown, Massachusetts, the daughter of George Rix Wiswell and Salome Nickerson Wiswell. Her father was a sea captain, born in England.

== Career ==
Wiswell was a nurse in Boston for much of her life, and was a skilled weaver, spinner, knitter and quiltmaker. She was a Union Army nurse during the American Civil War, serving from 1862 to 1865 under Dorothea Dix at the Seminary Hospital in Georgetown, D.C., and at hospitals in Winchester and Fortress Monroe. Wiswell presented letters signed by Dix and several physicians and politicians, and by former patients, as evidence for her successful 1886 petition to Congress, requesting a federal pension. The Plymouth post of the Grand Army of the Republic, and the Plymouth Board of Selectmen, also endorsed her petition. In reviewing her petition, the House Committee on Invalid Pensions declared that "this claimant is a most worthy woman."

In 1876, for the Centennial Exposition in Philadelphia, Wiswell and one of her sisters demonstrated spinning and weaving in the New England Log Cabin exhibit. She played a character called "Aunt Tabitha". She also demonstrated spinning and weaving at the Soldiers' Home Bazar in Boston.

== Personal life and legacy ==
Wiswell was known for singing hymns of early New England. She died in 1897, at the age of 91, in Plymouth. The Rebecca Wiswell Tent of the Daughters of Veterans, a chapter based in Quincy, Massachusetts, was named in her memory.
