= Little Hall Island =

Island in Nunavut, Canada

- Location within Nunavut Location within Canada

Geography
- Location: Davis Strait
- Coordinates: 62°31′N 64°09′W
- Archipelago: Arctic Archipelago

Administration
- Canada
- Nunavut: Nunavut
- Region: Qikiqtaaluk

Demographics
- Population: Uninhabited

Little Hall Island (also known as Hall Smaller Island) is an island off the coast of Baffin Island in Canada's Arctic Archipelago. It lies south of Hall Island and east of Hudson Island and Loks Land, near the mouth of Frobisher Bay. In 1576, it was visited by Christopher Hall, a member of the Frobisher expedition. The expedition brought a rock from the island back with them to England, where it was mistaken for gold ore, causing much excitement.
