= Luella Island =

Island in Canada

- Location within Nunavut Location within Canada

Geography
- Location: Frobisher Bay
- Coordinates: 63°20′43″N 68°12′48″W
- Archipelago: Arctic Archipelago

Administration
- Canada
- Nunavut: Nunavut
- Region: Qikiqtaaluk

Demographics
- Population: Uninhabited

Luella Island is one of the many uninhabited Canadian arctic islands in Qikiqtaaluk Region, Nunavut. It is a Baffin Island offshore island located in Frobisher Bay, southeast of the capital city of Iqaluit. Other islands in the immediate vicinity include Anchorage Island, Dog Island, Crowell Island, Kungo Island, and Metela Island.
