= Gay Island =

Uninhabited island in Nunavut, Canada

- Location within Nunavut Location within Canada

Geography
- Location: Frobisher Bay
- Coordinates: 63.33°N 67.83°W
- Archipelago: Arctic Archipelago

Administration
- Canada
- Nunavut: Nunavut
- Region: Qikiqtaaluk

Demographics
- Population: Uninhabited
- Source: Gay Island at Atlas of Canada

Gay Island (in French: Île Gay) is one of the many uninhabited Canadian arctic islands in Qikiqtaaluk Region, Nunavut. It is a Baffin Island offshore island located in Frobisher Bay, southeast of Iqaluit.

Gay Island lies south-southeast of Culbertson Island. Other islands in the immediate vicinity include Brook Island, Brigus Island, Falk Island, Peak Island, and Smith Island. Gay Island is -4 hours UTC/GMT.
