= Culbertson Island =

Island in Nunavut, Canada

- Location within Nunavut Location within Canada

Geography
- Location: Frobisher Bay
- Coordinates: 63°22′46″N 067°55′48″W
- Archipelago: Arctic Archipelago

Administration
- Canada
- Territory: Nunavut
- Region: Qikiqtaaluk

Demographics
- Population: Uninhabited

Culbertson Island is one of the many uninhabited Canadian Arctic islands in the Qikiqtaaluk Region, Nunavut. It is a Baffin Island offshore island located in Frobisher Bay, southeast of the capital city of Iqaluit.

Culbertson Island is 3 mi (4.8 km) long, and 2 mi (3.2 km) wide. It is north-northwest of Gay Island. Other islands in the immediate vicinity include Low Island, Mark Island, McAllister Island, Peak Island, and Precipice Island.
