= Frobisher's Farthest =

Island in Nunavut, Canada

- Location within Nunavut Location within Canada

Geography
- Location: Frobisher Bay
- Coordinates: 63.50°N 68.01°W
- Archipelago: Arctic Archipelago
- Area: 15 sq mi (39 km^{2})

Administration
- Canada
- Nunavut: Nunavut
- Region: Qikiqtaaluk

Demographics
- Population: Uninhabited
- Source: Frobisher's Farthest at Atlas of Canada

Frobisher's Farthest is one of the many uninhabited Canadian arctic islands in Qikiqtaaluk Region, Nunavut. It is a Baffin Island offshore island located in Frobisher Bay, southeast of Iqaluit. It is 15 sq mi (39 km^{2}) in size.

The island was named by Arctic explorer Charles Francis Hall.

Other islands in the immediate vicinity include Algerine Island, Alligator Island, McBride Island, Mitchell Island, and Pink Lady Island.
