= Monument Island =

Island in Nunavut, Canada

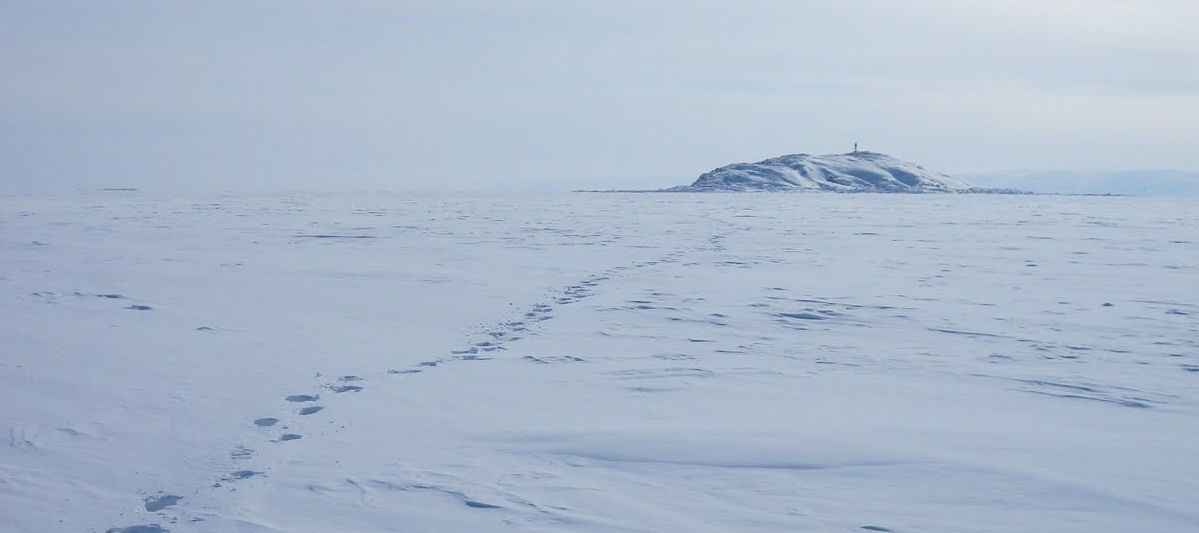

- Location within Nunavut Location within Canada

Geography
- Location: Frobisher Bay
- Coordinates: 63°42′N 68°30′W
- Archipelago: Arctic Archipelago

Administration
- Canada
- Nunavut: Nunavut
- Region: Qikiqtaaluk

Demographics
- Population: Uninhabited

Monument Island is one of the many uninhabited Canadian arctic islands in Qikiqtaaluk Region, Nunavut. It is a Baffin Island offshore island located in Frobisher Bay, southeast of the capital city of Iqaluit. Other islands in the immediate vicinity include Cairn Island, Long Island, Mair Island, McLaren Island, and Qarsau Island.
