= Pugh Island =

Island in Nunavut, Canada

- Location within Nunavut Location within Canada

Geography
- Location: Frobisher Bay
- Coordinates: 63°14′N 68°7′W
- Archipelago: Arctic Archipelago

Administration
- Canada
- Territory: Nunavut
- Region: Qikiqtaaluk

Demographics
- Population: Inhabited (Jun. 2015)

Additional information
- Private island

Pugh Island is an inhabited private Baffin Island offshore island located in the Arctic Archipelago in the territory of Nunavut. The island lies in Frobisher Bay, less than 1 km (0.62 mi) from Baffin Island's Everett Mountains range. Islands in the immediate vicinity include Pike and Fletcher Islands to the east.
