= Fletcher Island (Nunavut) =

Island in Nunavut, Canada

- Location within Nunavut Location within Canada

Geography
- Location: Frobisher Bay
- Coordinates: 63°12′0″N 67°48′0″W
- Archipelago: Arctic Archipelago

Administration
- Canada
- Nunavut: Nunavut
- Region: Qikiqtaaluk

Demographics
- Population: Uninhabited

Fletcher Island is a Baffin Island offshore island located in the Arctic Archipelago in the territory of Nunavut. The island lies in Frobisher Bay, north of Newell Sound. The Hall Peninsula is to the east. Islands in the immediate vicinity include: Field Island to the east; Bruce Island to the northeast; Pike and Pugh Islands to the west.
