= Pike Island (Nunavut) =

Island in Nunavut, Canada

- Location within Nunavut Location within Canada

Geography
- Location: Frobisher Bay
- Coordinates: 63°15′N 068°00′W
- Archipelago: Arctic Archipelago

Administration
- Canada
- Nunavut: Nunavut
- Region: Qikiqtaaluk

Demographics
- Population: Uninhabited

Pike Island (or Pikes Island) is a Baffin Island offshore island located in the Arctic Archipelago in the territory of Nunavut. The island lies in Frobisher Bay, between Pugh Island and Fletcher Island.
