= Low Island (Nunavut) =

Island in Qikiqtaaluk Region, Nunavut, Canada

- Location within Nunavut Location within Canada

Geography
- Location: Frobisher Bay
- Coordinates: 63°24′36″N 67°58′26″W
- Archipelago: Arctic Archipelago

Administration
- Canada
- Nunavut: Nunavut
- Region: Qikiqtaaluk

Demographics
- Population: Uninhabited

Low Island is one of the many uninhabited Canadian arctic islands in Qikiqtaaluk Region, Nunavut. It is a Baffin Island offshore island located in Frobisher Bay just off the Bartlett Narrows, southeast of the capital city of Iqaluit. Other islands in the immediate vicinity include Culbertson Island, Mark Island, McAllister Island, Mitchell Island, and Precipice Island.

Another Low Island lies in the Milne Inlet of northern Baffin Island.
