= Bishop Island =

Island in Nunavut, Canada

- Location within Nunavut Location within Canada

Geography
- Location: Frobisher Bay
- Coordinates: 63°38′N 068°45′W
- Archipelago: Arctic Archipelago

Administration
- Canada
- Territory: Nunavut
- Region: Qikiqtaaluk

Demographics
- Population: Uninhabited

Bishop Island is a Baffin Island offshore island located in the Arctic Archipelago in the territory of Nunavut. The island lies in Frobisher Bay, approximately 13 km (8.1 mi) southwest of Iqaluit. Hill Island and Faris Island are in the immediate vicinity.

The island was named by American Arctic explorer Charles Francis Hall.
