= Pichit Island =

Island in Nunavut, Canada

- Location within Nunavut Location within Canada

Geography
- Location: Frobisher Bay
- Coordinates: 63°34′35″N 68°05′45″W
- Archipelago: Arctic Archipelago

Administration
- Canada
- Nunavut: Nunavut
- Region: Qikiqtaaluk

Demographics
- Population: Uninhabited

Pichit Island is one of the many uninhabited Canadian arctic islands in Qikiqtaaluk Region, Nunavut. It is a Baffin Island offshore island located in Frobisher Bay, approximately 4 km (2.5 mi) south of the capital city of Iqaluit. Other islands in the immediate vicinity include Crimmins Island, Frobisher's Farthest, Jenvey Island, Kudlago Island, and Sybil Island.
