= Thompson Island (Nunavut) =

Island in Qikiqtaaluk Region, Nunavut, Canada

Native name: Twer-oong Island
- Location within Nunavut Location within Canada

Geography
- Location: Frobisher Bay
- Coordinates: 63°29′N 68°28′W
- Archipelago: Arctic Archipelago

Administration
- Canada
- Territory: Nunavut
- Region: Qikiqtaaluk

Demographics
- Population: Uninhabited

Thompson Island (variant: Twer-oong Island) is an uninhabited island off the shore of Baffin Island located in the Arctic Archipelago in the territory of Nunavut. The island lies in Frobisher Bay, south of Faris Island and Hill Island.
