= Hill Island =

Island in Nunavut, Canada

- Location within Nunavut Location within Canada

Geography
- Location: Frobisher Bay
- Coordinates: 63.64°N 68.68°W
- Archipelago: Arctic Archipelago

Administration
- Canada
- Nunavut: Nunavut
- Region: Qikiqtaaluk

Demographics
- Population: Uninhabited

Hill Island is a Baffin Island offshore island located in the Arctic Archipelago in the territory of Nunavut. The uninhabited island lies in Frobisher Bay, approximately 12 km (7.5 mi) southwest of Iqaluit. Bishop Island and Faris Island are in the immediate vicinity.
