= Hall Peninsula =

Peninsula in Nunavut, Canada

Coordinates: 63°30′N 066°00′W

The Hall Peninsula is a peninsula on the southern end of Baffin Island, in Nunavut, Canada. It lies between Frobisher Bay on the west, and the Cumberland Sound on the east between 62°40'N and 65°10'W. The Hall Peninsula is part of the Arctic Tundra biome—the world's coldest and driest biome. The Blunt Peninsula extends off the southeastern part of the Hall Peninsula.

The Hall Peninsula includes the Chidliak Kimberlite Province, which had been found to include diamond-bearing kimberlite pipes.
