= Frobisher Bay =

Inlet in Nunavut, Canada

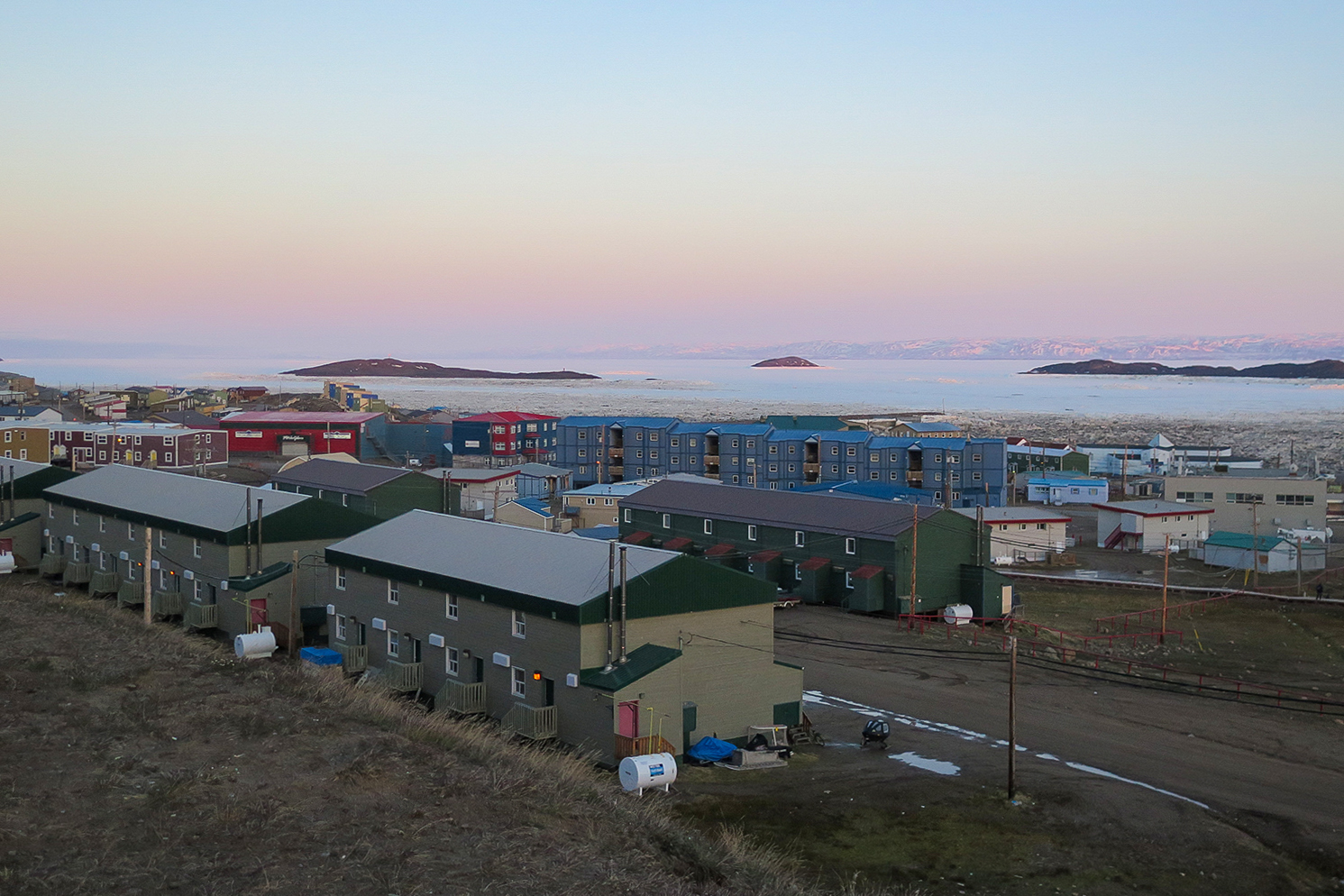
- Frobisher Bay from Iqaluit, June 2015

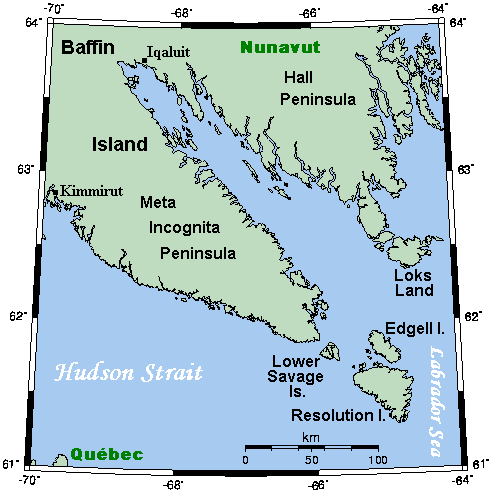
- Frobisher Bay and environs

- Location within Nunavut
- Location: Nunavut
- Coordinates: 62°50′N 66°35′W
- River sources: Sylvia Grinnell River
- Ocean/sea sources: Davis Strait
- Basin countries: Canada
- Max. length: 230 km (140 mi)
- Max. width: 40 km (25 mi)
- Settlements: Iqaluit

Frobisher Bay is an inlet of the Davis Strait in the Qikiqtaaluk Region of Nunavut, Canada. It is located in the southeastern corner of Baffin Island. Its length is about 230 km (140 mi) and its width varies from about 40 km (25 mi) at its outlet into the Davis Strait to roughly 20 km (12 mi) towards its inner end.

The capital of Nunavut, Iqaluit, known as Frobisher Bay from 1942 to 1987, lies near the innermost end of the bay.

== Geography ==
Frobisher Bay has a tapered shape formed by two flanking peninsulas, the Hall Peninsula to the northeast, and the Meta Incognita Peninsula to the southwest. The Bay's funnel like shape ensures that the tidal variance at Iqaluit each day is about 7 to 11 m (23 to 36 ft). This shape is due to the large outlet glacier centred over Foxe Basin during the Quaternary glaciation (Pleistocene), which gouged the Bay's basin, now flooded by the sea.

Within Frobisher Bay itself are a number of bays, inlets and sounds. Among these are Wayne Bay and Ward Inlet (up towards the far northwestern end), and also Newell Sound, Leach Bay and Kneeland Bay (along the southwest shore). Hamlen Bay, Newton Fiord, Royer Cove, and Waddell Bay are located along the northeast shore. Frobisher Bay's whole coastline is marked with innumerable narrow inlets into which flow many small streams. There are high cliffs on both shores, rising to roughly 330 m (1,080 ft) on the northeast shore, and twice that on the southwest shore as a result of the tilting of the Earth's crust locally during the early Tertiary.

Frobisher Bay is also studded with islands. These include Hill Island and Faris Island near Iqaluit, Pugh, Pike, Fletcher and Bruce islands at the mouth of Wayne Bay, Augustus Island in Ward Inlet, and Chase, McLean, Gabriel and Nouyarn islands towards the Bay's mouth.

== Climate ==
Climate data is taken from Iqaluit Airport. The area has a tundra climate (Köppen: ET, Trewartha: Ftkd) typical of the Arctic region, although it is well outside the Arctic Circle. It features long, cold winters and brief, cool summers. Average monthly temperatures are below freezing for eight months of the year. Iqaluit averages just over 400 millimetres (16 in) of precipitation annually, much wetter than many other localities in the Arctic Archipelago, with the summer being the wettest season. Temperatures of the winter months are comparable to other northern communities further west on the continent such as Yellowknife and to some extent even Fairbanks, Alaska, even though the area is a few degrees colder than the latter. Summer temperatures are, however, much colder due to its easterly maritime position affected by the waters of the cold Baffin Island Current. This means that the tree line is much further south in the eastern part of Canada, being as southbound, in spite of low elevation, as northern Labrador.

Although it is north of the natural tree line, there are some short, south-facing imported black spruce (Picea mariana) specimens protected by snowdrifts in the winter, in addition to a few shrubs, which are woody plants. These include the Arctic willow (Salix arctica). The Arctic willow may be up to around 7.6 m (25 ft) horizontally, but only 150 mm (6 in) tall.

The climate of Iqaluit is also colder than Gulf Stream locations on the same latitude. For example, the Norwegian city of Trondheim has an annual mean temperature that is 15.2 °C (27.4 °F) milder.

The lowest temperature ever recorded was −45.6 °C (−50.1 °F) on 10 February 1967. The highest temperature ever recorded in Iqaluit was 26.8 °C (80.2 °F) on 21 July 2008.

Iqaluit's climate is changing. In 1979, the mean temperature was −9.0 °C (15.8 °F), but in 2023, it was −6.8 °C (19.8 °F). Furthermore, during the first 23 years of that period, there were 14 years which displayed a negative temperature anomaly and 9 which displayed a positive one, whereas in the second 23 years, there were only 3 negative and 20 positive temperature anomaly years.

Climate data for Iqaluit (Iqaluit Airport) WMO ID: 71909; coordinates 63°45′N 68°33′W; elevation: 33.5 m (110 ft); 1991–2020 normals, extremes 1946–present
| Month | Jan | Feb | Mar | Apr | May | Jun | Jul | Aug | Sep | Oct | Nov | Dec | Year |
|---|---|---|---|---|---|---|---|---|---|---|---|---|---|
| Record high humidex | 3.3 | 5.2 | 4.3 | 6.8 | 13.3 | 21.7 | 27.8 | 27.6 | 18.8 | 8.6 | 4.8 | 3.4 | 27.8 |
| Record high °C (°F) | 3.9 (39.0) | 5.7 (42.3) | 4.2 (39.6) | 7.2 (45.0) | 13.3 (55.9) | 22.7 (72.9) | 26.8 (80.2) | 25.5 (77.9) | 18.4 (65.1) | 9.1 (48.4) | 5.6 (42.1) | 3.8 (38.8) | 26.8 (80.2) |
| Mean daily maximum °C (°F) | −22.0 (−7.6) | −22.9 (−9.2) | −17.6 (0.3) | −8.9 (16.0) | −0.3 (31.5) | 7.0 (44.6) | 12.0 (53.6) | 11.1 (52.0) | 5.6 (42.1) | −0.5 (31.1) | −7.5 (18.5) | −14.7 (5.5) | −4.9 (23.2) |
| Daily mean °C (°F) | −26.0 (−14.8) | −27.0 (−16.6) | −22.4 (−8.3) | −13.5 (7.7) | −3.2 (26.2) | 3.9 (39.0) | 8.1 (46.6) | 7.5 (45.5) | 2.9 (37.2) | −3.2 (26.2) | −11.1 (12.0) | −18.9 (−2.0) | −8.6 (16.5) |
| Mean daily minimum °C (°F) | −29.9 (−21.8) | −31.0 (−23.8) | −27.2 (−17.0) | −18.1 (−0.6) | −6.1 (21.0) | 0.7 (33.3) | 4.2 (39.6) | 3.8 (38.8) | 0.2 (32.4) | −5.8 (21.6) | −14.7 (5.5) | −23.0 (−9.4) | −12.2 (10.0) |
| Record low °C (°F) | −45.0 (−49.0) | −49.0 (−56.2) | −44.7 (−48.5) | −34.2 (−29.6) | −26.1 (−15.0) | −10.2 (13.6) | −2.8 (27.0) | −2.5 (27.5) | −12.8 (9.0) | −27.1 (−16.8) | −36.2 (−33.2) | −43.4 (−46.1) | −49.0 (−56.2) |
| Record low wind chill | −65.5 | −66.4 | −62.1 | −53.1 | −36.0 | −18.8 | −7.2 | −8.6 | −18.6 | −42.9 | −56.8 | −60.1 | −66.4 |
| Average precipitation mm (inches) | 16.3 (0.64) | 14.0 (0.55) | 21.4 (0.84) | 22.7 (0.89) | 21.0 (0.83) | 48.7 (1.92) | 39.8 (1.57) | 61.7 (2.43) | 50.8 (2.00) | 30.2 (1.19) | 18.5 (0.73) | 16.2 (0.64) | 361.2 (14.22) |
| Average rainfall mm (inches) | 0.4 (0.02) | 0.1 (0.00) | 0.0 (0.0) | 0.0 (0.0) | 3.3 (0.13) | 46.1 (1.81) | 44.4 (1.75) | 65.5 (2.58) | 43.9 (1.73) | 12.3 (0.48) | 0.7 (0.03) | 0.0 (0.0) | 216.6 (8.53) |
| Average snowfall cm (inches) | 19.4 (7.6) | 15.1 (5.9) | 20.6 (8.1) | 23.8 (9.4) | 23.0 (9.1) | 3.8 (1.5) | 0.0 (0.0) | 0.1 (0.0) | 8.5 (3.3) | 21.1 (8.3) | 25.9 (10.2) | 28.8 (11.3) | 190.0 (74.8) |
| Average precipitation days (≥ 0.2 mm) | 12.1 | 10.7 | 12.4 | 12.8 | 10.6 | 12.3 | 12.4 | 14.3 | 15.7 | 13.2 | 12.5 | 12.8 | 151.5 |
| Average rainy days (≥ 0.2 mm) | 0.06 | 0.06 | 0.06 | 0.06 | 1.7 | 10.7 | 13.1 | 14.8 | 13.2 | 3.8 | 0.24 | 0.0 | 57.7 |
| Average snowy days (≥ 0.2 cm) | 10.1 | 8.8 | 8.7 | 9.6 | 8.7 | 2.1 | 0.06 | 0.12 | 3.7 | 9.8 | 11.9 | 12.7 | 86.3 |
| Average relative humidity (%) (at 1500 LST) | 68.1 | 67.6 | 68.9 | 74.6 | 77.3 | 74.6 | 72.9 | 73.5 | 75.2 | 78.7 | 78.4 | 74.3 | 73.7 |
| Mean monthly sunshine hours | 32.4 | 94.0 | 172.2 | 216.5 | 180.5 | 200.2 | 236.8 | 156.8 | 87.9 | 51.4 | 35.6 | 12.6 | 1,476.8 |
| Percentage possible sunshine | 18.5 | 39.0 | 47.4 | 48.2 | 31.9 | 32.5 | 39.3 | 31.0 | 22.4 | 16.8 | 17.7 | 8.9 | 29.5 |
| Average ultraviolet index | 0 | 0 | 1 | 2 | 4 | 4 | 4 | 3 | 2 | 1 | 0 | 0 | 2 |
Source: Environment and Climate Change Canada (sunshine 1981–2010 from ECCC) (ultraviolet index from Weather Atlas)

== History ==
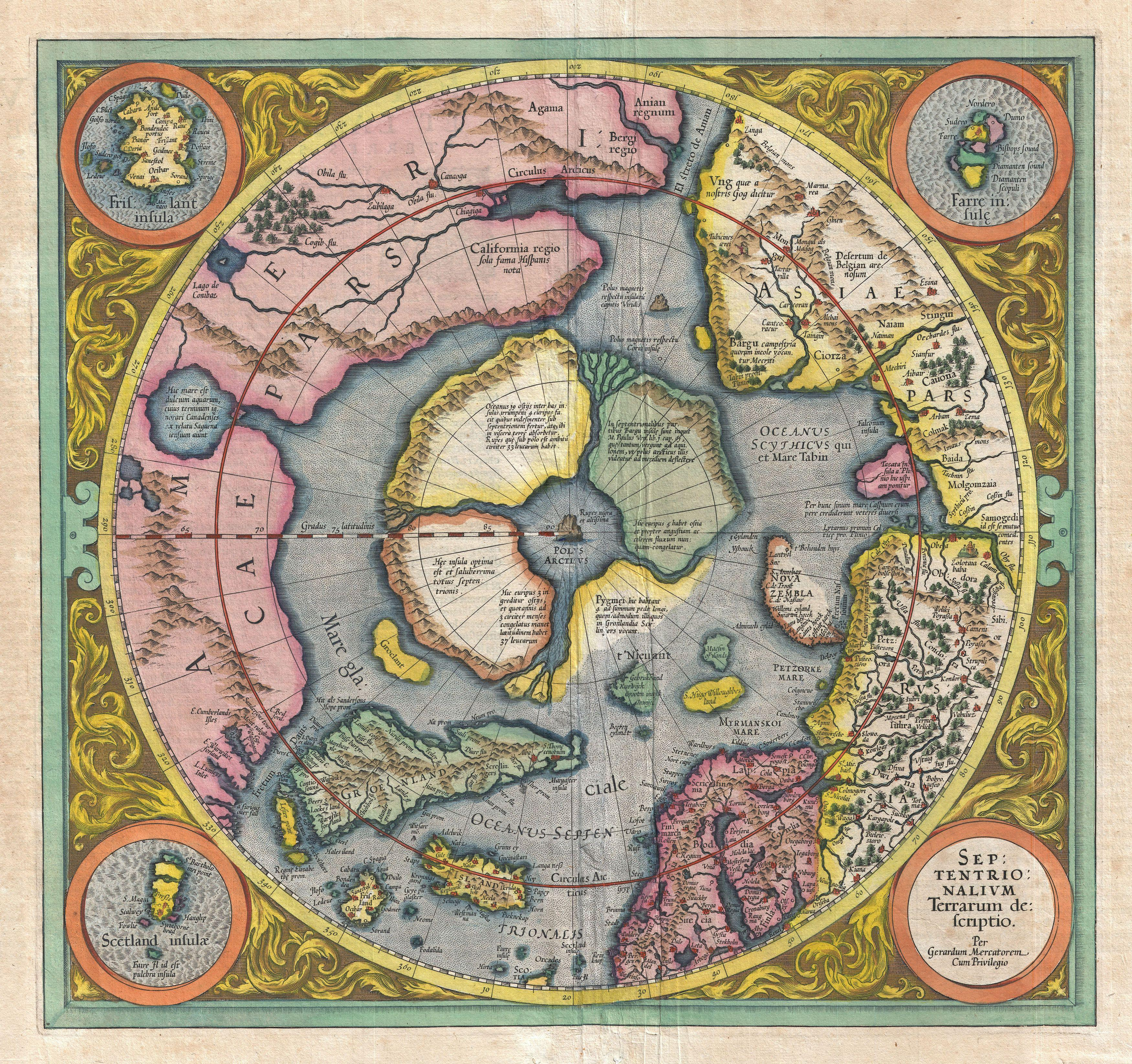
The Hondius Map, displaying the Frobisher "Strait" bisecting southern Greenland.

Frobisher Bay is named for the English navigator Sir Martin Frobisher, who, during his search for the Northwest Passage in 1576, became the first European to visit it. Until Hall's voyage in 1861, the Bay was thought by Europeans to be a strait separating Baffin Island from another island.

The first Church of England service recorded on North American soil was a celebration of Holy Communion at Frobisher Bay in the last days of August or early September 1578. The Anglican Church of Canada's Prayer Book fixes the day of commemoration as September 3. The chaplain on Frobisher's voyage was " 'Maister Wolfall (probably Robert Wolfall), minister and preacher', who had been charged by Queen Elizabeth 'to serve God twice a day'."
