= Inuit culture =

Culture of the Inuit in the Arctic and Subarctic region

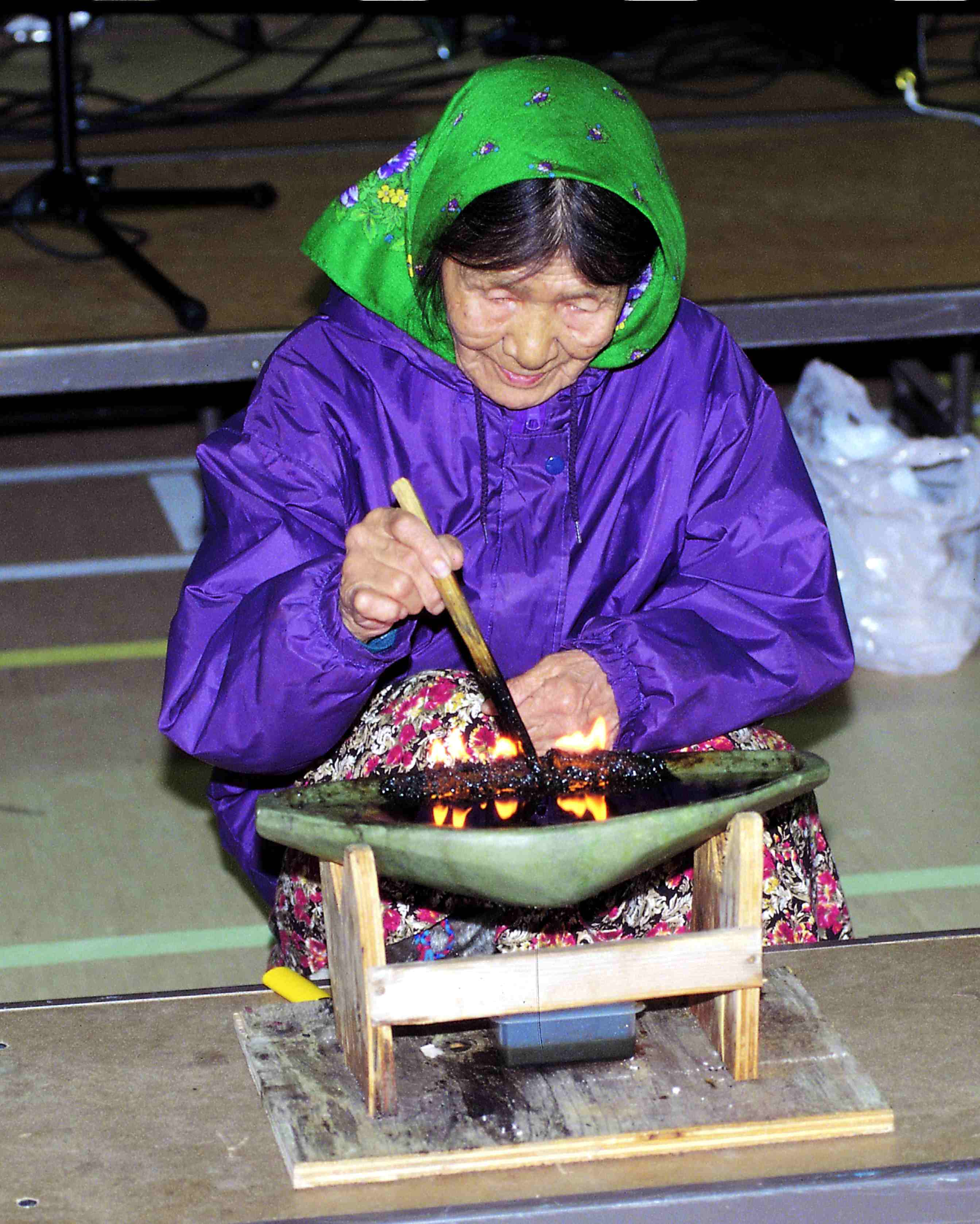
Qulliq – lit to celebrate the creation of Nunavut Territory of Canada on April 1, 1999

The Inuit are an indigenous people of the Arctic and subarctic regions of North America (parts of Alaska, Canada, and Greenland). The ancestors of the present-day Inuit are culturally related to Iñupiat (northern Alaska), and Yupik (Siberia and western Alaska), and the Aleut who live in the Aleutian Islands of Siberia and Alaska. The term culture of the Inuit, therefore, refers primarily to these areas; however, parallels to other Eskimo groups can also be drawn.

The word "Eskimo" has been used to encompass the Inuit and Yupik, and other indigenous Alaskan and Siberian peoples, but this usage is in decline.

Various groups of Inuit in Canada live throughout the Inuvialuit Settlement Region of the Northwest Territories, the territory of Nunavut, Nunavik in northern Quebec and Nunatsiavut in Labrador and the unrecognised area known as NunatuKavut. With the exception of NunatuKavut these areas are sometimes known as Inuit Nunangat.

The traditional lifestyle of the Inuit is adapted to extreme climatic conditions; their essential skills for survival are hunting and trapping, as well as the construction of fur clothing for survival. Agriculture was never possible in the millions of square kilometres of tundra and icy coasts from Siberia to Northern America including Greenland. Therefore, hunting became the core of the culture and cultural history of the Inuit. They used harpoons and bows and arrows to take down animals of all sizes. Thus, the everyday life in modern Inuit settlements, established only some decades ago, still reflects the 5,000-year-long history of a hunting culture which allowed the Inuit and their ancestors to populate the Arctic.

== Etymology ==
Europeans in North America used to refer to the Inuit as Eskimos, but the people consider that term pejorative. The primary reason some people consider Eskimo derogatory is the questionable but widespread perception that in Algonquian languages it means "eaters of raw meat." One Cree speaker suggested the original word that became corrupted to Eskimo might indeed have been askamiciw (which means "he eats it raw"), and the Inuit are referred to in some Cree texts as askipiw (which means "eats something raw").

The word Inuit is the autonym, the name which the people use for themselves and it means "the people." Its singular form is Inuk.

== Inuit Circumpolar Council ==
The Inuit Circumpolar Council (ICC), formerly Inuit Circumpolar Conference, is a multinational non-governmental organization (NGO) and indigenous peoples' organization (IPO) representing the 180,000 Inuit and Yupik people (sometimes referred to as Eskimo) living in Alaska (United States), Canada, Greenland (Denmark), and Chukotka, Siberia (Russia).

The Conference, which first met in June 1977, initially represented Native Peoples from Canada, Alaska and Greenland. In 1980 the charter and by-laws of ICC were adopted. The Conference agreed to replace the term Eskimo with the term Inuit. This has not however met with widespread acceptance by some groups, most pre-eminently the Yupik. The principal goals of the ICC are to strengthen unity among Inuit of the circumpolar region; to promote Inuit rights and interests on an international level; to develop and encourage long-term policies that safeguard the Arctic environment; and to seek full and active partnership in the political, economic, and social development of circumpolar regions., or in short: to strengthen ties between Arctic peoples and to promote human, cultural, political and environmental rights and polities at the international level.

== Cultural history ==
=== Overview ===
The common ancestors of the Inuit and related peoples are believed by anthropologists to have their origin in eastern Siberia, arriving in the Bering Sea area approximately 10,000 years ago.

The Inuit in North America (including Greenland) are the descendants of what anthropologists call the Thule people, who emerged from western Alaska around 1000 CE. They had split from the related Aleut group about 4000 years ago and from northeastern Siberian migrants. They spread eastwards across the Arctic. They displaced the related Dorset culture (from 500 BCE to between CE 1000 and 1500), called the Tuniit in Inuktitut, which was the last major Paleo-Eskimo culture.

The first Inuit group, known as Paleo-Eskimos, crossed the Bering Strait in 3000 BCE presumably on winter ice, which was long after earlier migrations by the ancestors to the North American Indians. Archaeological finds have revealed that the Paleo-Eskimos moved to the northern Canadian Arctic in 2300 BCE, apparently because of a change in climate. From there they gradually followed the herds of game across the Arctic to Greenland, and dispersed into more distinct nomadic tribes.

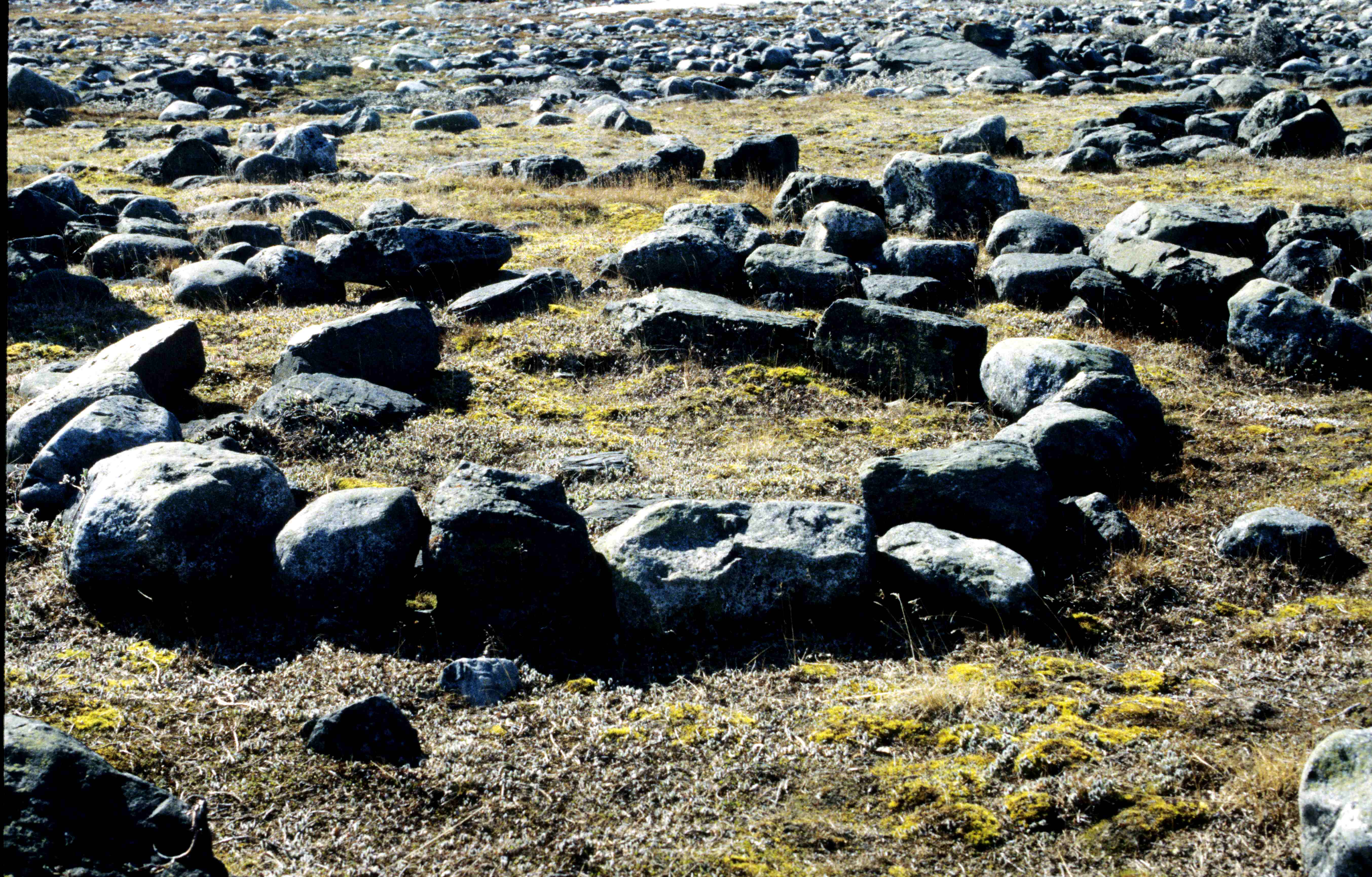
Tent ring from the Thule culture on the Meliadine River, near Rankin Inlet, Canada

Pre-Dorset culture (c. 3200 to 850 BCE) is said to begin when the Paleo-Eskimos settled on the islands of the Canadian archipelago and northern Greenland. The descriptions "Dorset" and "Pre-Dorset" come from Cape Dorset on Baffin Island, the source of an assemblage which in 1925 anthropologist Diamond Jenness identified as originating from a hitherto unknown "Dorset culture." The Paleo-Eskimos weathered the winter of the high Arctic with much more difficulty than their later descendants because they lacked technologies such as boats, harpoon-tips, dog sleds, dwellings other than skin tents, and sources of warmth other than small fire pits and wood fuels. In the central Canadian Arctic, they mainly hunted muskoxen and caribou with bow and arrow, and fished with barbed devices. Groups living near the coastline hunted seals, walruses and smaller whales by throwing harpoons from the shore or from sea ice.

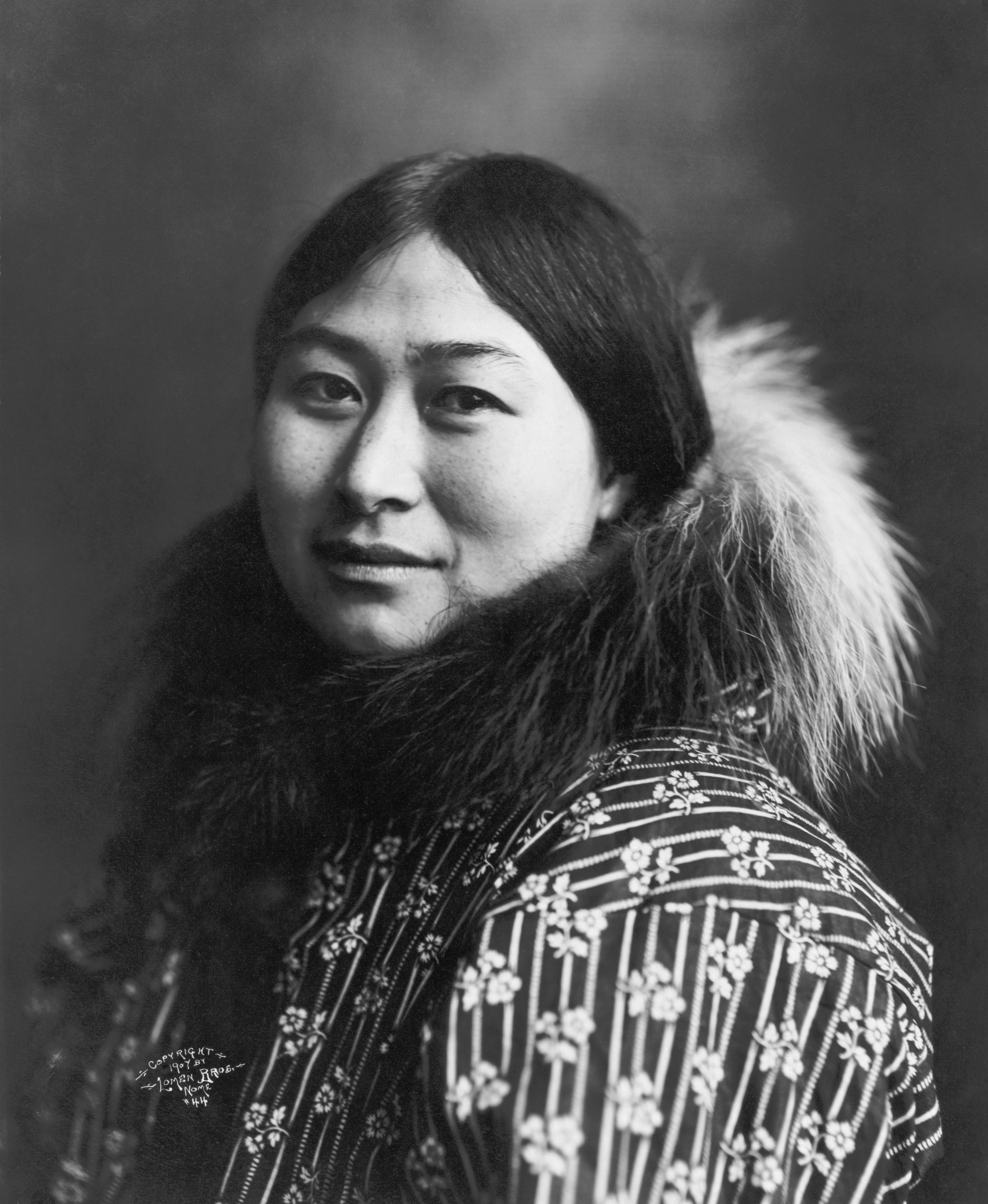
Inuk woman, Nome, 1907

=== Period I (9000 – 5000 BCE) ===
- Western Arctic
  - Paleo-Arctic tradition – Alaska and the east, west, and the southwest Yukon Territory.
  - Anangula Tradition

=== Period II (5000 – c. 2000 BCE) ===
- Western Arctic
  - Ocean Bay I
  - Northern Archaic tradition

=== Period III (c. 2000 – 1000 BCE) ===
- Western Arctic
  - Takli Culture
  - Arctic small tool tradition (spreads eastward) = Alaska Peninsula, around Bristol Bay, and on the eastern shores of the Bering Strait
- Eastern Arctic
  - Eastern Arctic Small Tool Tradition groups c. 3000 – 500 BCE
- Independence I culture

Northern Greenland and the Canadian Arctic between 2400 and 1000 BCE. This Paleo-Eskimo culture was named after Independence Fjord, where traces of a large settlement were found. Their lodgings were erected on elliptical foundations centred upon box-shaped hearths made of flat stones set on end. These they filled with driftwood, musk ox dung, and bones. They might have started fires with the help of a bow drill operated by sinews, which was in general use some centuries later.

- Saqqaq culture 2400 – 900 BCE

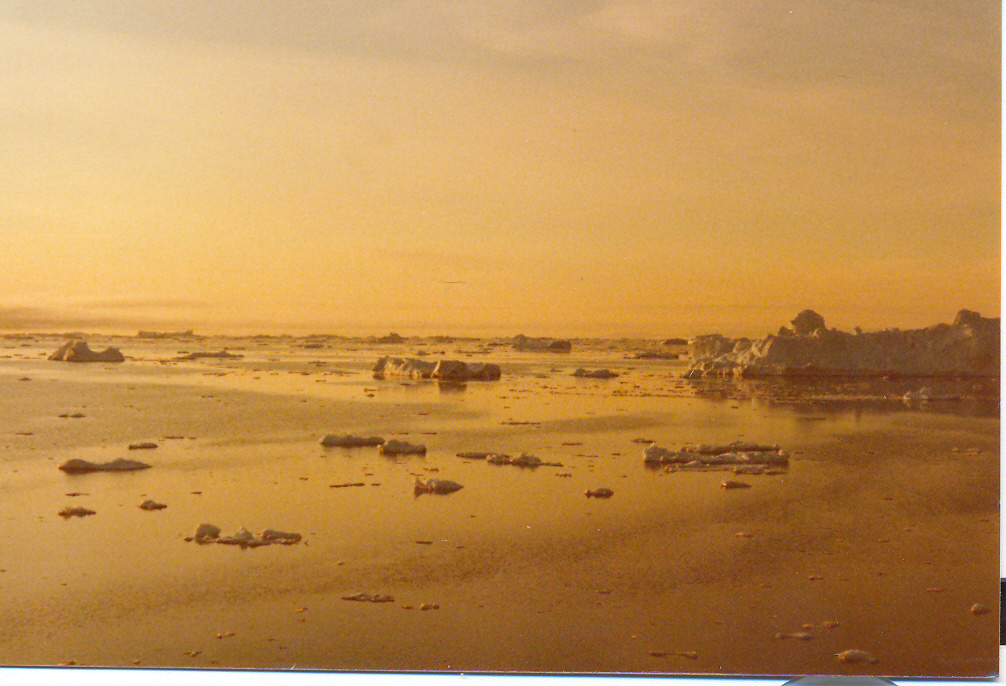
Hunting place of the Saqqaq culture on Disko Bay, Greenland, photo by Jan Kronsell

In the western and southern parts of the eastern coast of Greenland, the Saqqaq culture developed around 2300 BCE and lasted 1500 years. The centre of their settlements was Disko Bay near the place Saqqaq, which lent its name to the culture. The people extended their culture along the fjords and coastlines in the area. The culture of the Saqqaq people shows marked similarity to the culture that in the Canadian Arctic is described as "Pre-Dorset", and the two cultures developed around the same time. Scholars believe that the people of the Saqqaq split off from the Pre-Dorset culture, migrated into Greenland from Ellesmere Island in the north, and later migrated to the southern coast.

=== Period IV (1000 BCE – 1000 CE) ===
==== Western Arctic ====
- Kachemak tradition
- Norton tradition – 1000 BCE to 800 CE.
  - Choris (750 – 400 BCE),
  - Norton (500 BCE — 800 CE)
  - Ipiutak (100–200 BCE to 800 CE) (in northern Alaska, the forerunners of the Thule people)

==== Eastern Arctic ====
- Independence II culture (700 – 80 BCE)

Northern and northeastern Greenland from around, north and south of the Independence Fjord. Presumably for climatic reasons, northern Greenland was not populated for about 500 years afterward. Archaeological evidence has shown that before the disappearance of the Saqqaq culture from southern Greenland, a new culture arrived from the Canadian archipelago. The newer people showed a more developed culture from an archaeological standpoint. That culture is called Independence II culture, and it seems to have developed from the Canadian Pre-Dorset cultures. Possibly, they came in close contact with the Saqqaq culture.

The range of distribution of the Independence II people approximately corresponds to that of the Independence I people. The oldest finds have been dated to 1400 BCE, and the most recent to 400 BCE. Researchers have not confirmed whether the farthest northern regions of Greenland were constantly settled during this 1000-year period, because only about 10 dwellings are extant. The climate of that time steadily worsened; the warmest temperature of the Independence II period approximately matches the coldest temperature of the Independence I period.

Archaeological research has focused its fieldwork on areas of Greenland below 83 degrees latitude north for traces of the Independence II culture. In 1987 the remains of a larger Independence II settlement was discovered on the Île-de-France (at about 78 degrees north). The Independence II people hunted the same animals as earlier cultures (seals and muskoxen), but for the first time also walruses. The houses of the Independence II period were similar to those of the Independence I period, only more complex. So far no connection between the two cultures has been proven. Independence II tools are more reminiscent of the Pre-Dorset and the later Dorset culture. The fate of the Independence II culture is unknown; it is possible that they migrated south along the east coast of Greenland and merged into the Dorset Culture.

- Dorset Culture (500 BCE – 1000 CE)

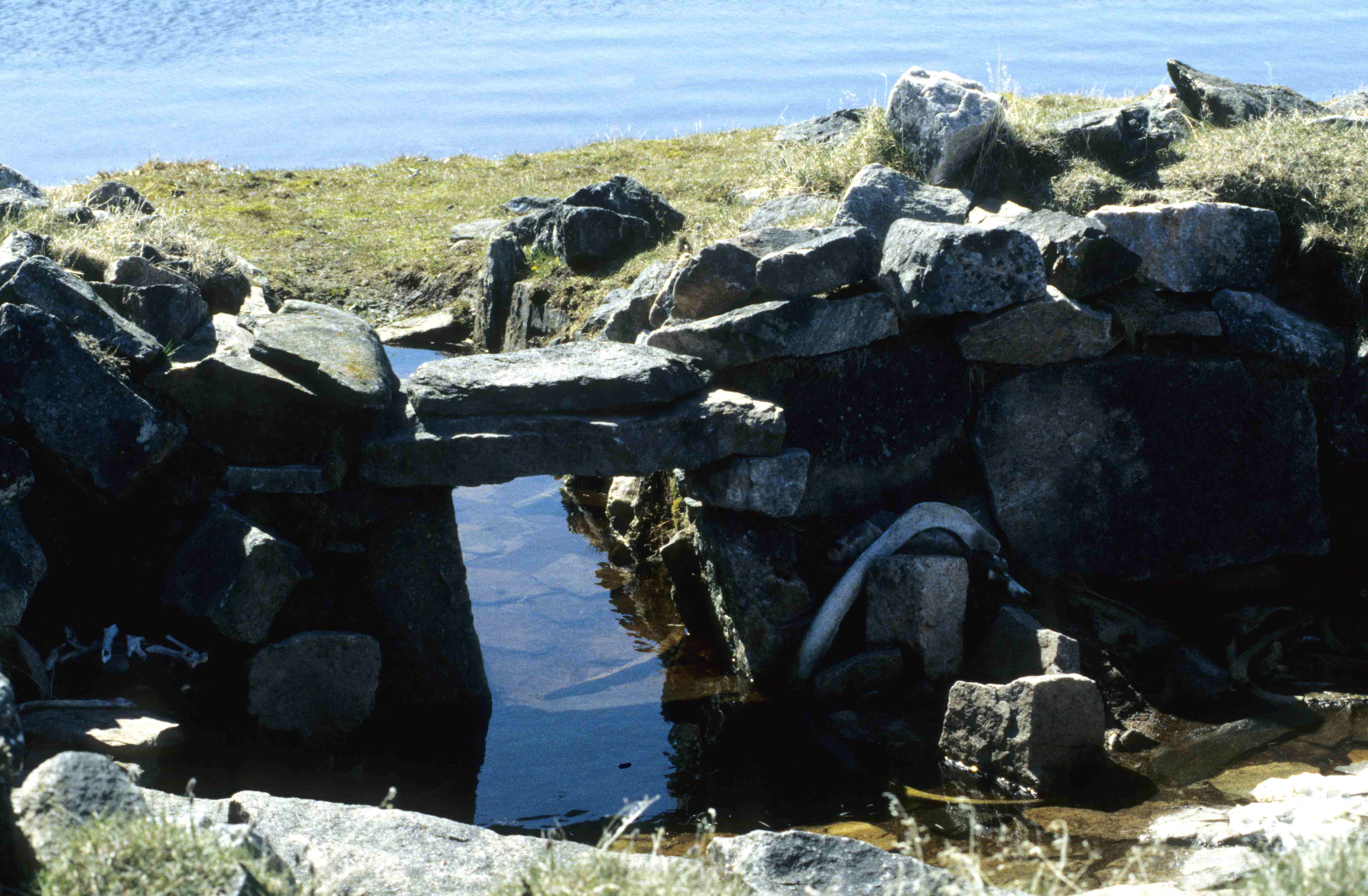
Thule artefacts on Mallikjuaq Island, near Cape Dorset

Archaeological evidence shows that between 500 BCE and 500 CE, remarkable technological and cultural advances took place in the area of northern Canada and Greenland known as the Dorset region. Today this period is known as Dorset I. The Dorset people are probably identical to the Tuniit (singular Tuniq, also Tornit or Tunirjuat), who are described in Inuit mythology as powerful giants who dwelt in stone houses. They were believed to have been capable of enormous feats of strength, such as carrying walruses or moving enormous boulders.

Their hunting methods were greatly improved over previous Arctic cultures. They probably invented the igloo, which is difficult to determine because such ephemeral structures leave no archaeological evidence. They spent the winters in relatively permanent dwellings constructed of stone and pieces of grass; these were the precursors of the later qarmaqs. They were also the first culture to carve seal-oil lamps (qulliq, also spelled kudlik) from soapstone.

In the next 500 years, known as the Dorset II period, the Dorset culture expanded to occupy the region between Victoria Island in the west to Greenland in the east to Newfoundland in the south. A shift in climate, which enabled them to settle high-Arctic regions, probably contributed to this. It is remarkable that the Dorset II culture uniformly maintained the stylistic attributes of the Dorset I culture despite this rapid territorial expansion.

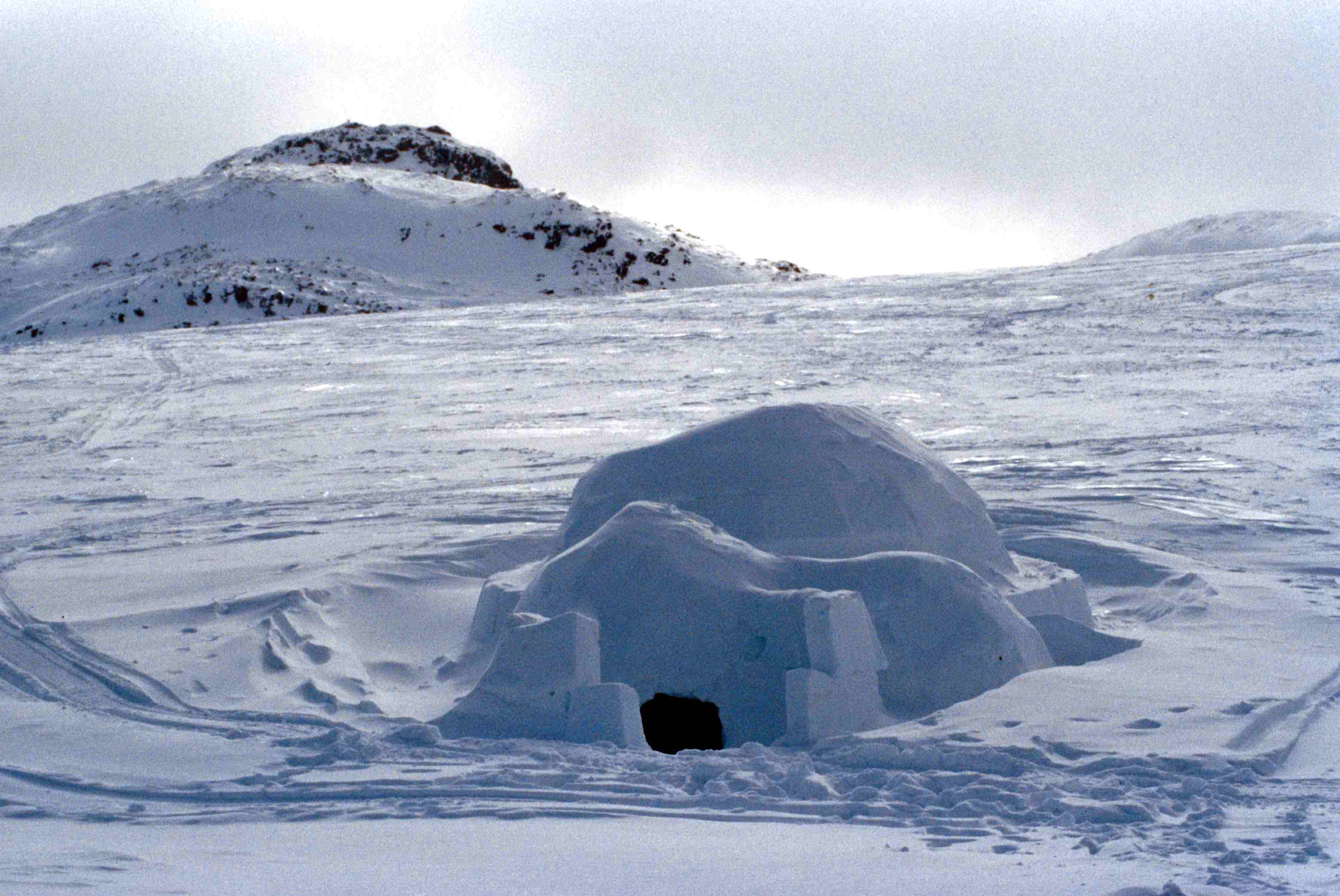
Igloo

Ivory carvings date to as early as the Dorset I period, but artistic activity appears to have greatly increased in the Dorset II period. The presence of tiny human masks that subtly suggest animal features, carvings of bears with incised spirit lines indicating skeletal structures, and enigmatic tubes that may have been used to suck spirits out of the possessed; indicate the shamanistic, ritual character of this art. This cultural trend probably results from socio-economic pressures exerted upon the Dorset by the presence of new ethnic groups in the region.

This period's climate was responsible for the Vikings' naming of Iceland and Greenland, labels that in our times sound paradoxical.

=== Period V (1000 CE – present) ===
==== Western Arctic ====
- Koniaq
- Old Bering Sea
  - Okvik
  - Birnirk – north coast of Alaska, sixth to the twelfth century CE.
  - Punuk
  - Thule—Bering Sea Thule
    - "Western Thule" of North Alaska
    - Canadian Thule
      - Inugsuk Thule of Greenland
- Thule culture (1000 –1800 CE)

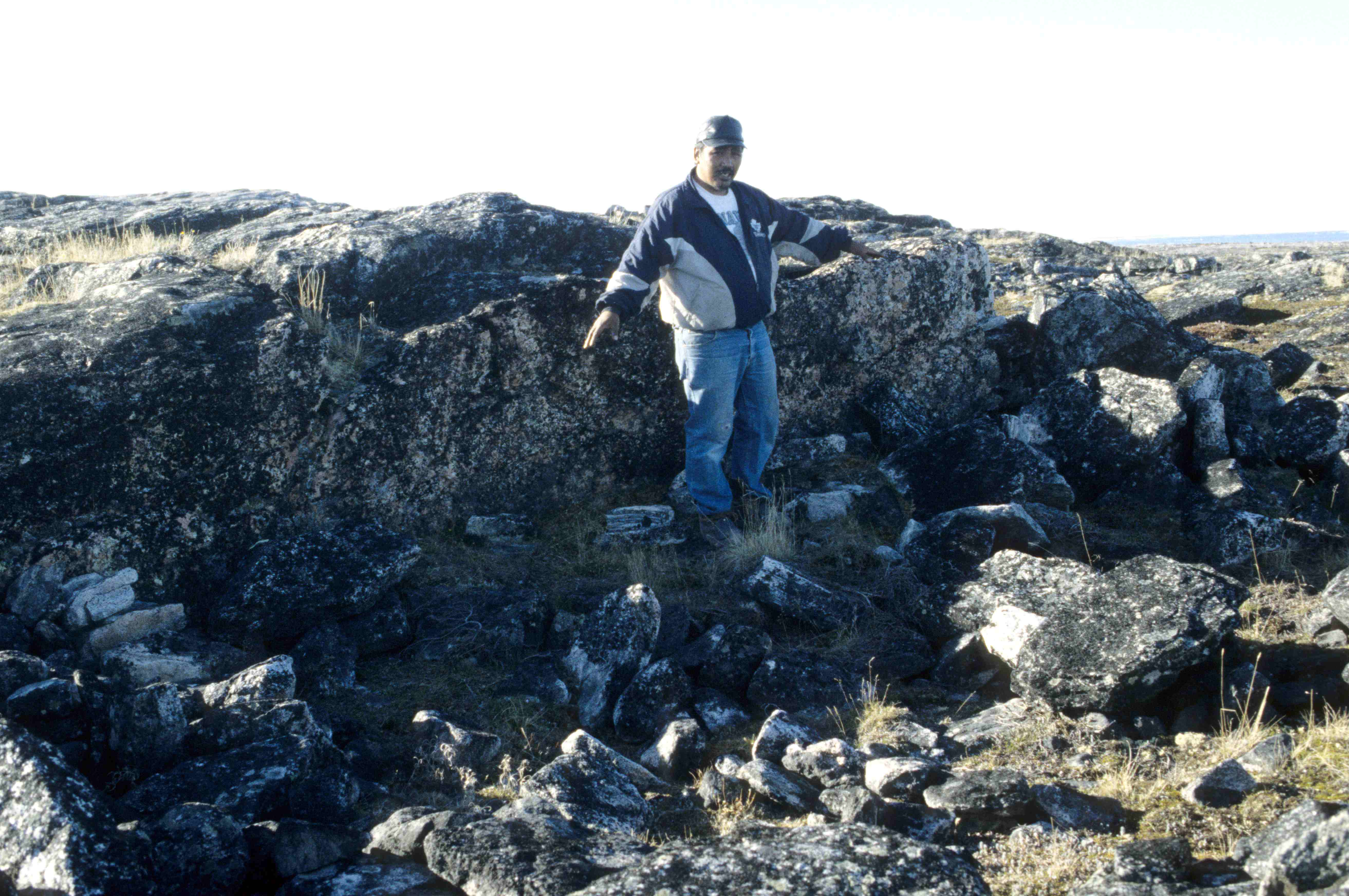
An Inuk explains Thule settlement artefacts at Chesterfield Inlet

The relatively temperate climate of the Alaska had allowed much greater cultural advances among the peoples there during the 3,000 years since the Pre-Dorset had left the region.

==== Cultural and technological advancements in Alaska ====
The various peoples of the Alaskan coasts had in that period developed entirely new techniques for hunting and fishing; these technologies also fundamentally changed their lifestyle and culture. Developments included boats constructed of watertight seal skin stretched over wooden frames such as the kayak (Inuktitut: qajag), used by hunters, and the umiak, a large boat used by groups of up to 20 women; new styles of spears, and harpoons equipped with weights and floats. These technologies enabled the hunting of whales, which provided a valuable source of food (especially whale skin, rich in vitamin C) and expanded the range of available materials to be processed for construction (bones and skin) and heating (whale oil). The development of dog sleds and of igloos that could be entered by a tunnel provided easier travel for the people and warmer dwellings during the winter. All of these advances promoted the formation of new social, religious, and artistic values.

==== The wave of Thule migrations ====
The warmer climate of North America in 1000 CE increased the amount of habitable territory in the Arctic and contributed to population growth. Presumably, this development, along with the constant pursuit of quarry into higher latitudes and the search for meteorite iron, was a major impetus for the migration of the Alaskan Thule into northern Canada and Greenland. In the so-called "second migration", some of the displaced groups migrated south, settling in the Hudson Bay area. As Inuit myths explain, the Dorset-culture residents were assimilated by the technologically superior Thule in most areas but were massacred in others. The Dorset culture subsequently died out throughout the Arctic in a short period around 1000 CE. They held out for a few centuries longer in northern Labrador and in the Ungava region (until about 1300 CE); the isolated Sadlermiut survived until the early 20th century on the southern coasts of Southampton Island and two islands nearby, Walrus Island and Coats Island.

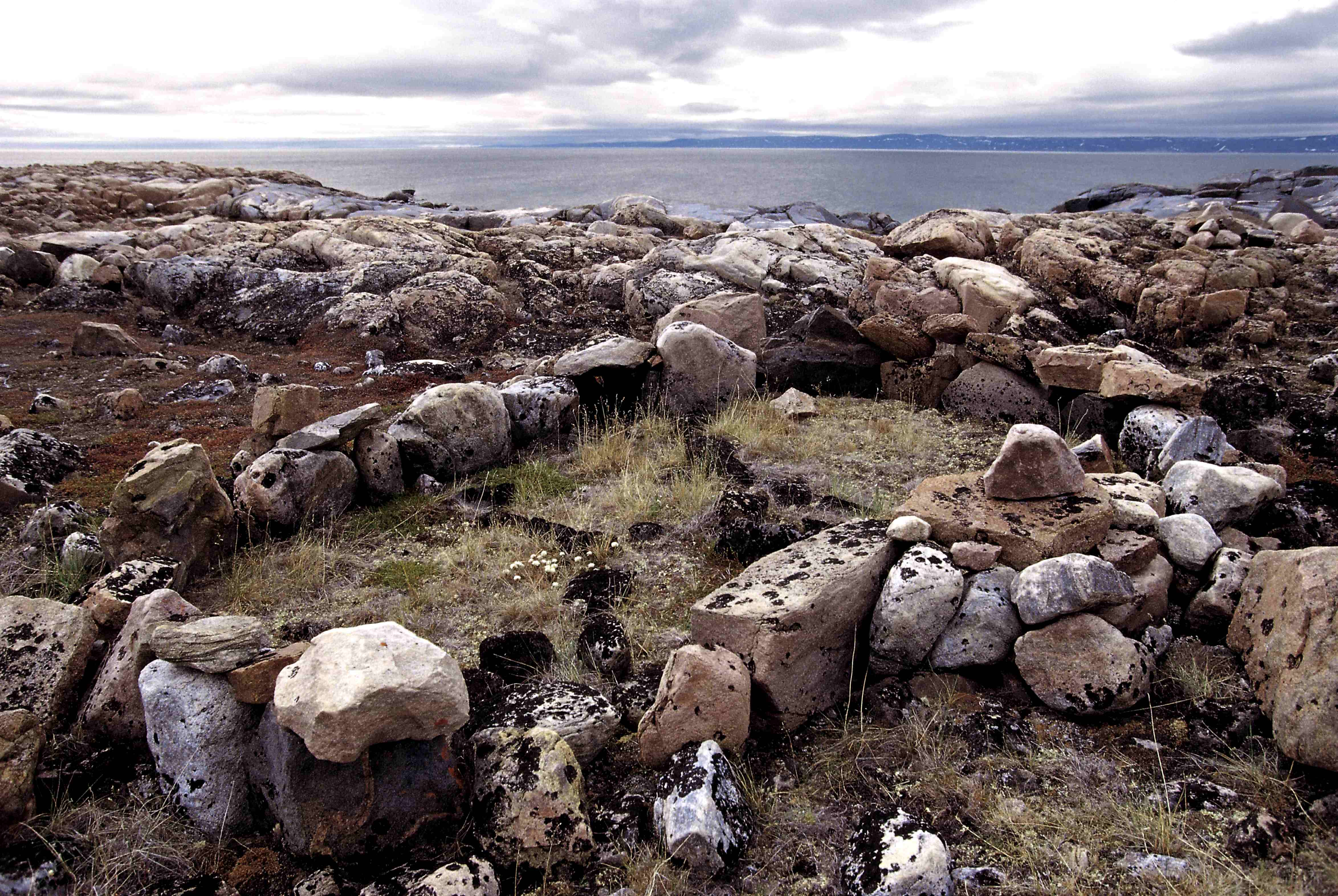
Remains of a Thule dwelling (Ukkusiksalik National Park)

The new arrivals were the direct ancestors of today's Inuit. They originated from the area around the Bering Strait, but are named the Thule after Thule in Greenland, the location of Comer's Midden, where the first traces of their settlements were excavated.

==== Thule dwellings ====
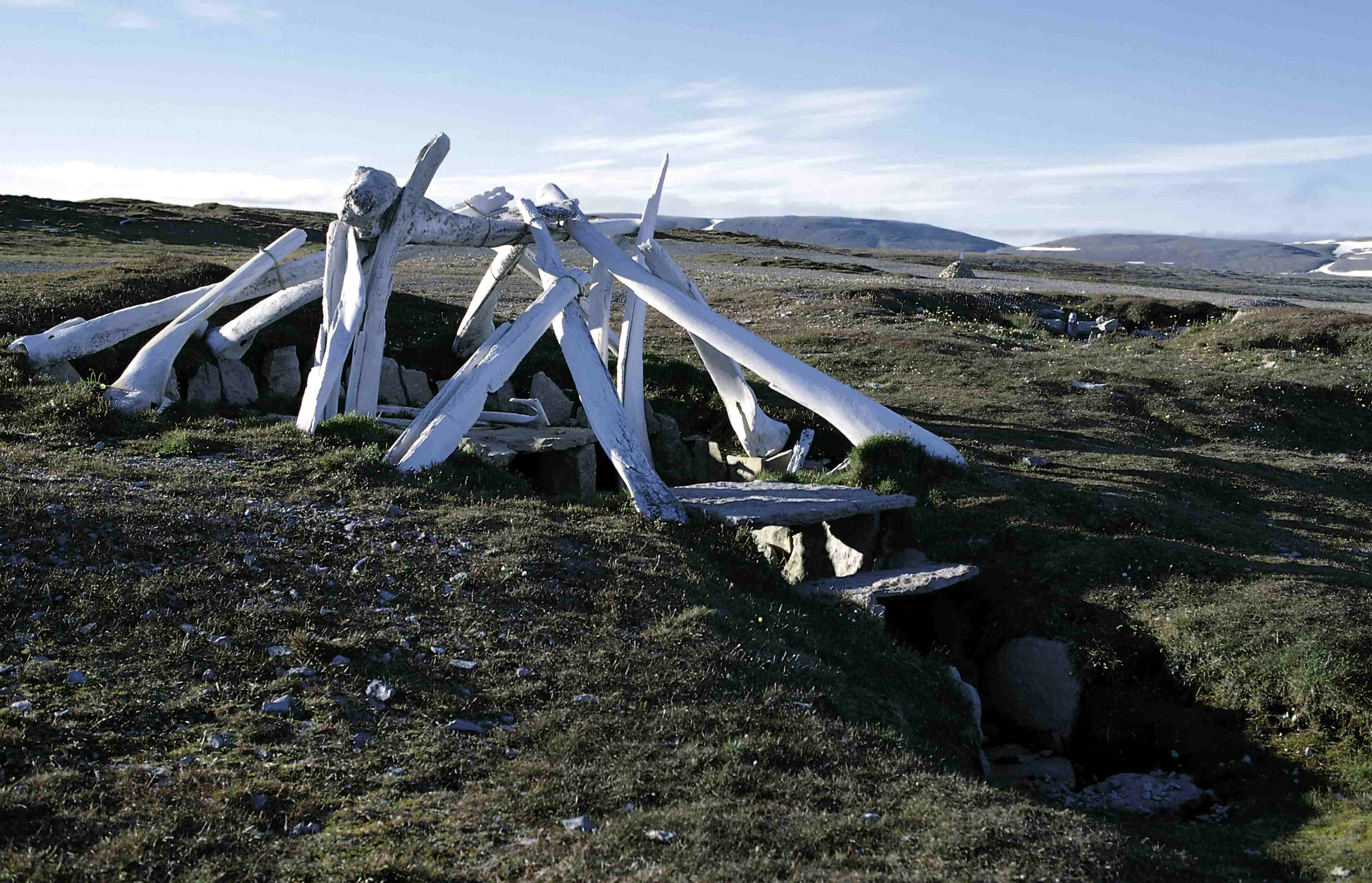
Whalebone house (with reconstructed whalebone dome), near Resolute

The typical Thule house was constructed from a framework of whale jawbones and ribs anchored in the tundra soil with rocks. Animal hides were stretched over the frame, which was covered with sod. As accommodations for long hunting trips, the Thule used hide-tents in the summer.

==== Artistic activities ====
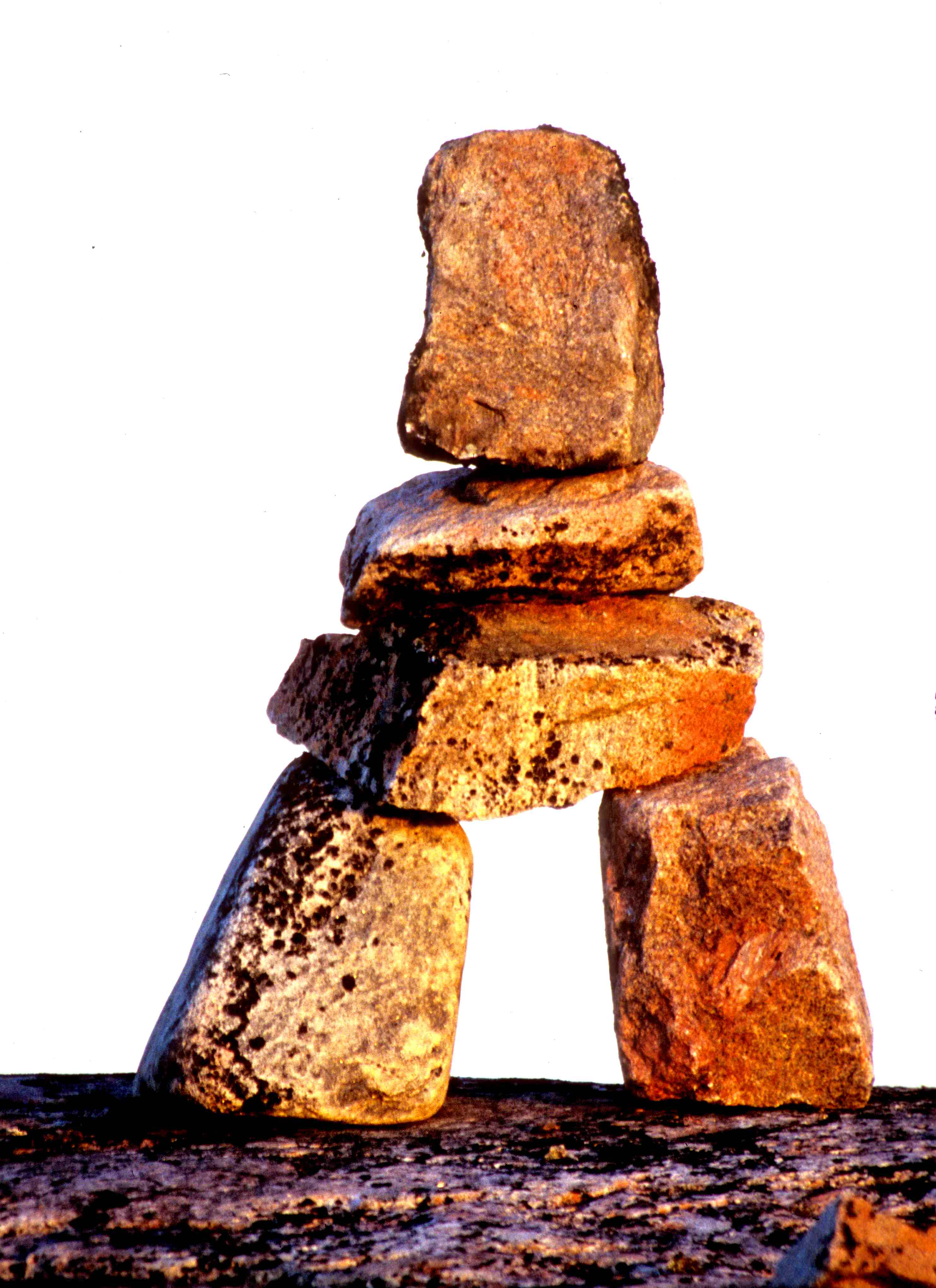
Inunnguaq, "like a human form" (Inuksuk)

While the artistic productions of the Dorset were almost exclusively shaped by shamanistic ritual and myths, such influences are barely detectable in Thule art. The utensils discovered in excavations of well-preserved Thule dwellings show only decorative incisions. These utensils were almost entirely functional, with no ritual purpose. Small figurative carvings in ivory of female figures, water birds, and whales have also been found in Thule sites, but in relatively small numbers. Occasionally water birds would be depicted with the heads of women and vice versa, but such shamanistic carvings are few among the already small proportions of figurative carvings in Thule art.

Among the art of the Thule, the depictions of bears especially contrasts with the art of the Dorset. In Dorset art, bears are realistically depicted within stylistic conventions; today, these objects are interpreted as spirit-helpers or amulets against dangers encountered in the hunt. In Thule art, images of bears are limited to carved bear heads that attached to harpoon shafts. Whether they served a decorative or functional purpose is uncertain (probably both). The Thule used bear teeth as jewellery, or hunting trophies. The artefacts left by the Thule generally suggests that they led a more comfortable lifestyle and had leisure time to artistically decorate their personal effects- their art was not the result of social or economic anxieties.

They constructed diverse and numerous Inuksuit (like a man), piled-stone landmarks that survive. Some are examples of an impressive art form.

==== Transitional phase (1300 – 19th century) ====
From the beginning of the 14th century, a gradual cooling occurred throughout the Canadian Archipelago and the Arctic Ocean coast of the mainland. The period between 1550 and 1880, the so-called "Little Ice Age", caused temperatures significantly lower than today's in North America and Europe (with a brief period of higher heat around 1800). The effect of the drop in temperature upon the hunting-dependent lifestyle of the Thule was significant. Entire regions of the high Arctic were depopulated, partly by mass migrations but also by the starvation of entire communities. The traditional way of life was maintained only by communities in the relatively hospitable regions of the Arctic: the southern end of Baffin Island, Labrador, and the southernmost tip of Greenland. In Greenland, the Thule developed a different social structure and new dwelling types, and became what is known as the Inugsuk culture.

In Greenland, the beginning of the 17th century brought the first European whaling ships and sudden change. In the following 150 years, up to 10,000 whalers would annually pass the coast of Greenland and substantially influence the culture of the Thule living there. The emerging trade relationships made intermarriage with European-Canadians and European-Americans common; there were few genetically pure Inugsuk after several generations.

==== Historical period of the Inuit (from 1800) ====
The 19th century is regarded as the beginning of "Inuit culture." Although the Thule traditions endured in a limited way, the living conditions of Inuit in the historical period were considerably worse than those of their ancestors 1000 years before. The technical standards and spirit of their artwork likewise began to decline. Carving and decorative engraving, for example, became rarer and less differentiated. The colder climate of the period and the resulting decline in animals as game meant that the Inuit were forced to abandon their winter settlements in search of quarry. In their newly nomadic way of life, the Inuit built more temporary winter dwellings. These were tent-like huts constructed of stone, grass, and snow. The Inuit called them qarmaqs. The technique of constructing igloos was further developed and became more widespread.

==== Contact with Europeans in Canada ====
Contact with Europeans was another important impetus for change in the culture of the Inuit. The earliest contacts with the Vikings, later with explorers, fishermen and whalers, affected Canadian Inuit (as opposed to Greenland's) less profoundly and more locally. Those early European arrivals did not intend to settle Canada. Such contacts proved fatal for many Inuit due to the spread of sexually transmitted diseases, smallpox and other infectious diseases.

In contrast, tradesmen, missionaries and representatives of the Canadian administration established themselves in the region and directly influenced the life of the natives. The Canadians erected the first administrative and police stations in 1903, near the important whaling base of Fullerton Harbour on Hudson Bay and on Herschel Island northwest of the Mackenzie Delta. In that same year, the Norwegian Roald Amundsen started to transit the famous Northwest Passage with his ship Gjøa on a more southerly course than that of his predecessors, alongside the Canadian mainland.

Starting at the beginning of the 20th century, radical changes occurred for the Arctic people. Greenland was visited with increasing frequency: Alfred Wegener led an expedition in 1912–13, and the Thule expeditions by Knud Rasmussen took place in 1915–1924. In 1933, the Permanent Court of International Justice attested Denmark's authority in Greenland, with cultural, political and structural impacts for the Inuit.

In Canada, the Hudson's Bay Company tapped the previously unexplored "Barren Lands" of the Kivalliq Region to the west of Hudson Bay for trade. The Inuit no longer hunted animals for food and clothing, but mainly to acquire goods for barter with the emissaries of markets in the south and in Europe. The fur of the Arctic fox was especially in demand, but other kinds of fur and the ivory of walruses and narwhals were also desirable. The insistence on fox fur alone caused disruption as the trapping of foxes was traditionally done by the women. However, the numbers required by the traders meant travelling long distances over the trap line and it became men's work (see Menstruation and Family life below). Due to trade, the Inuit could acquire goods of the European-Canadian civilization, such as weapons and ammunition, tobacco, coffee, tea, sugar and flour. To keep the hunters associated with the trading posts, the traders lent them traps and extended credit to the Inuit. Becoming more dependent on another people meant that the native society had lost its former self-sufficiency. Therefore, changing their cultural development.

==== 19th century social structure and way of life ====
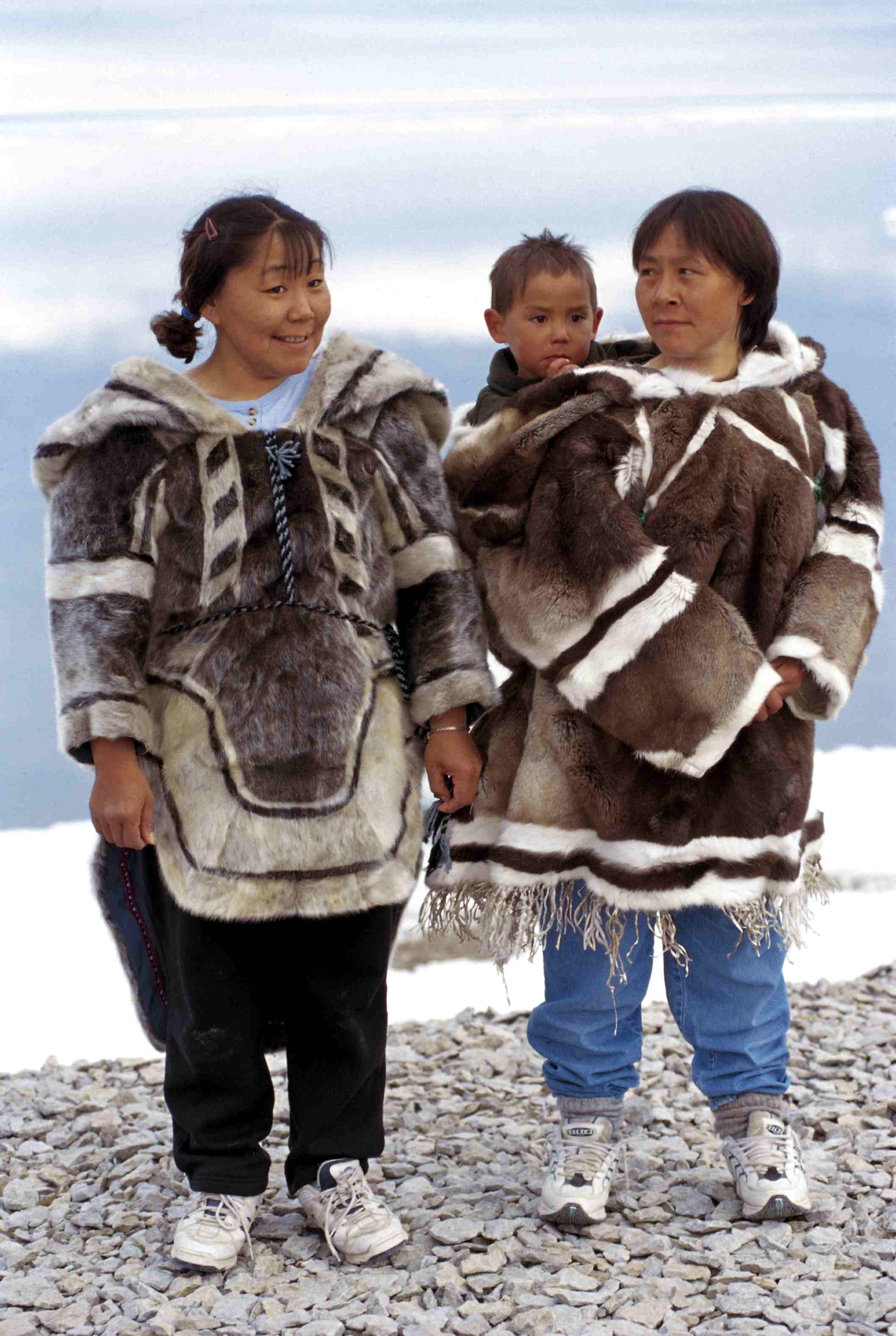
Traditional Inuit clothes; Amauti

The basic social structure of the Inuit in the 19th century consisted of an estimated 50 groups of 200 to 800 members apiece. The membership was based upon the voluntary association of large and loosely composed clans. The clans in turn were made up of extended families- the grandparents, parents, and children. Such a loose social structure, which allowed families self-sufficiency and self-governance, increased the chances of social survival in times of scarcity.

Hunting provided the Inuit with a balanced diet and the raw materials for clothing, housing, household implements and heating, boat and sled-building, hunting weapons, toys, and art-objects. Stones, carefully chosen and carved, were used for select but important objects: arrow, spear, and harpoon heads, hide-scrapers, and knives. Soapstone, a relatively soft and easily carved material, was used for the production of oil lamps (qulliqs) and cooking vessels.

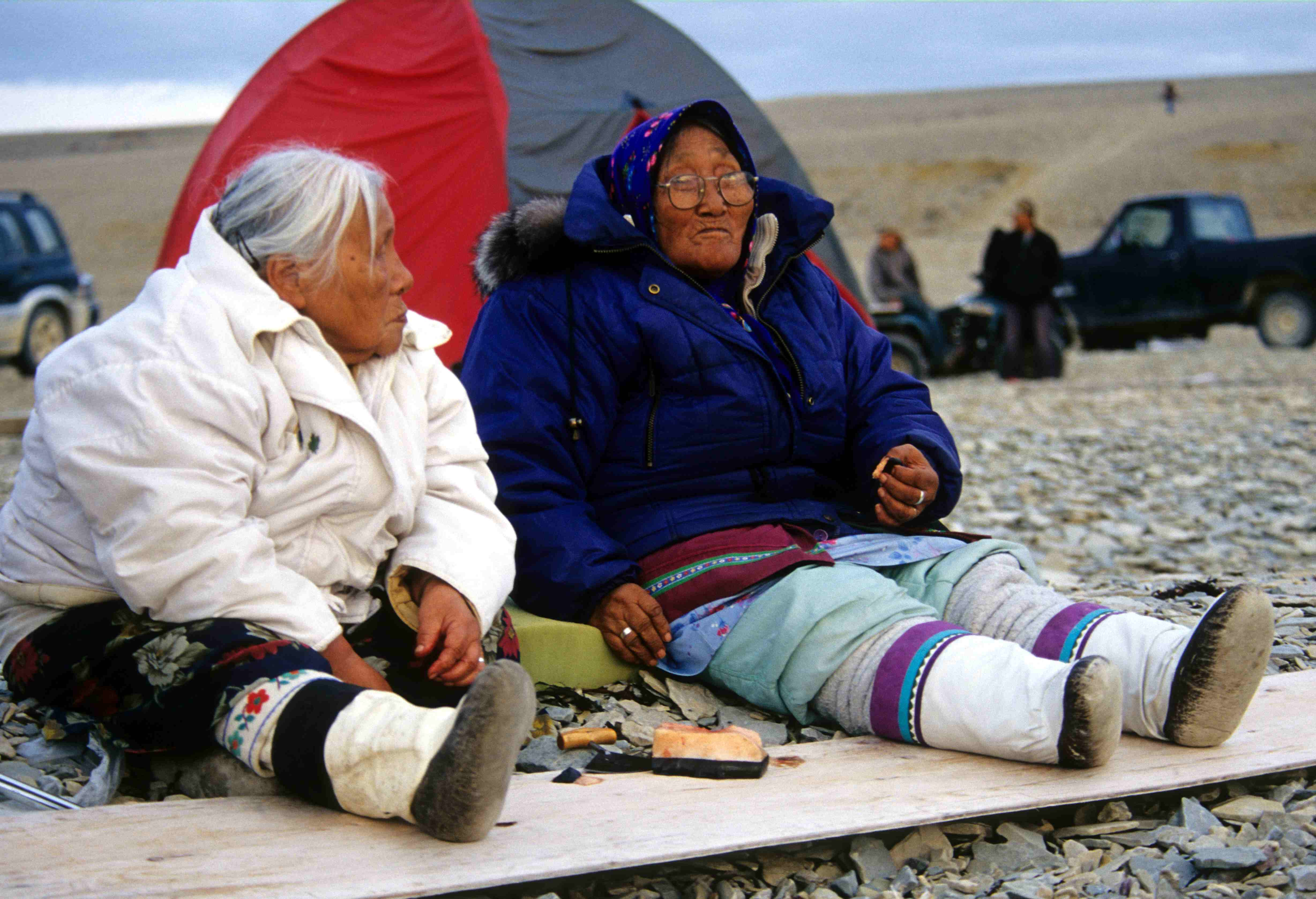
Women eating maktaaq, a traditional Inuit delicacy (the skin of a Greenland whale)

Plant-materials played a small role in Inuit culture, as they were so rare. Wood is scarce in the Arctic, except in the form of occasional driftwood. The bones, tusks, and antlers of hunted animals were used in its place. Berries were collected in large numbers during the late summer, but while they provided a source of some vitamins, they were far from sufficient. The people met their vitamin requirements by eating raw animal products, such as muktuk (whale skin and blubber), meat and fish.

The Inuit tradition of living in tents during summer and in igloos and qarmait (singular: qarmaq, warm half-subterranean houses made from boulders, whale bones and sod) in winter still followed the Thule practices. The most important principle of all building constructions was the lowered entrance tunnel, which served as a windscreen and cold trap. The inner living area was constructed at a higher level so that the heavier cold air could not easily enter it. Girl children played with string figures within the igloos, as preparation for learning to sew and partly as a ritual act. The girls of the Chugach people mainly played this in autumn because it was believed this weaving captured the sunrays and thus delayed the beginning of winter. Often the creation of string figures was accompanied by rhymes and songs describing tales, legends and myths.

The Inuit had developed winter clothing that ensured an effective use of the body heat, avoiding holes that would allow air to leak out. Apart from seal, mostly caribou skin was used, and in Greenland polar bear fur. In order to create a cushion of warm air, the clothing was loosely tailored and worn in two layers, the outer one with the hair inside, the inner one with the hair outside. In summer, only the inner layer was worn. The hood fixed on the inside of the coat avoided the leaking of warm air at the neck. Mothers used an additional part of their hoods for carrying the toddlers in their parka (amauti).

=== Nomadic life in the first half of the 20th century ===
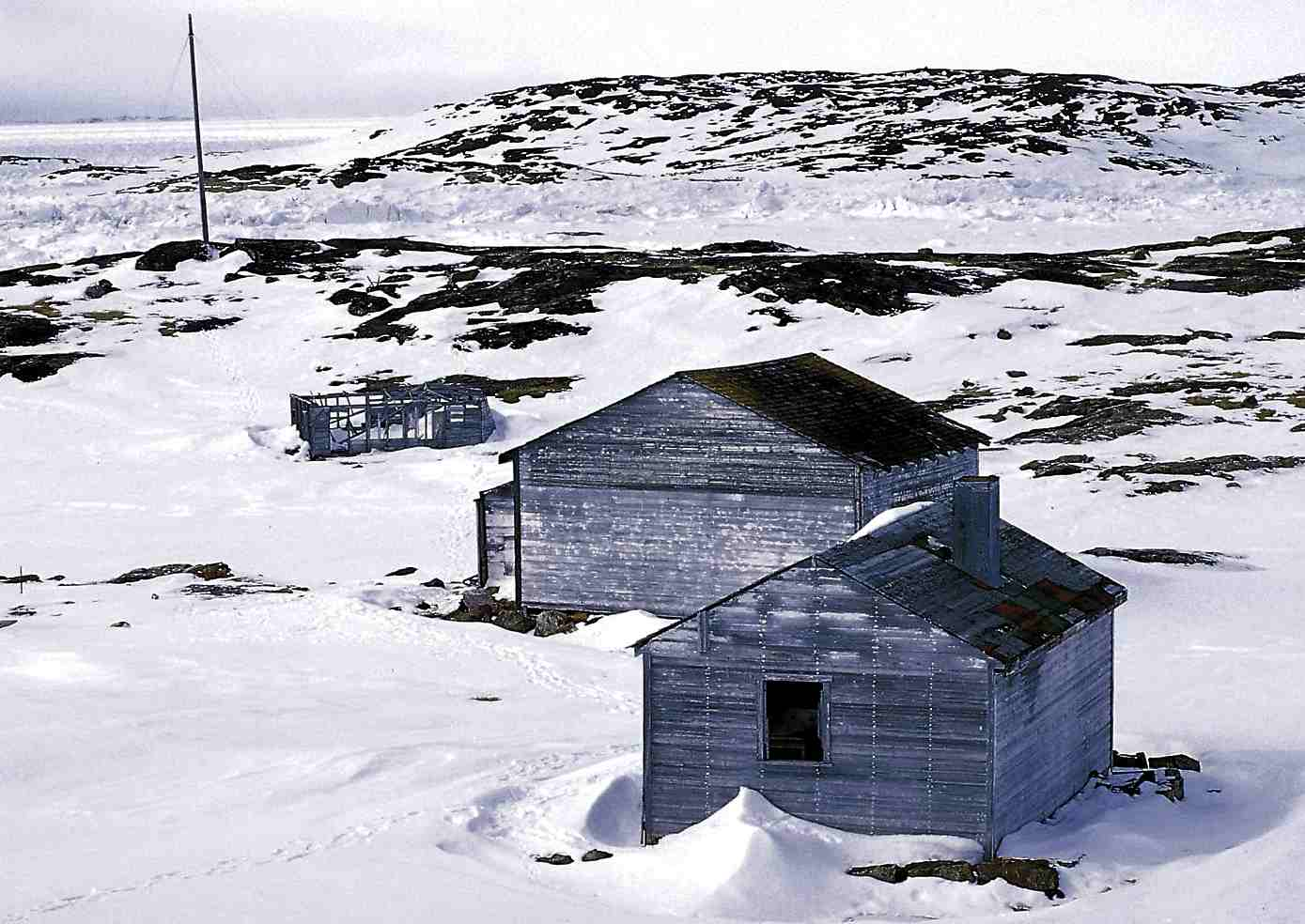
Camp Ikirasaq (Southern Baffin Island), abandoned in the late 1940s

Many elders still remember the time, more than 60 years ago, when the Inuit lived a nomadic lifestyle. Depending on the seasons (up to sixteen according to old traditions), they followed the animals they hunted for clothing and nourishment. They had to relocate and reconstruct their camps frequently and followed the same traditions for generations.

At the turn to the 20th century, most Inuit still lived in hide tents during the summer. Sometimes, they already owned canvas tents obtained from the Hudson's Bay Company. The interior was divided into a back part used for sleeping, usually raised by coat underlays, and a front part for cooking and living; a tradition still in practice today. The woman's sleeping place was always beside the kudlik, an oil lamp usually carved from soapstone used for lighting, heating and cooking, because it was her duty to operate it. The man's sleeping place was near the weapons and hunting equipment; the children were nestled between their parents for warmth. Today the kudlik is replaced by a product of modern industry, the Coleman stove, which is easy to transport and operated by gasoline and naphtha.

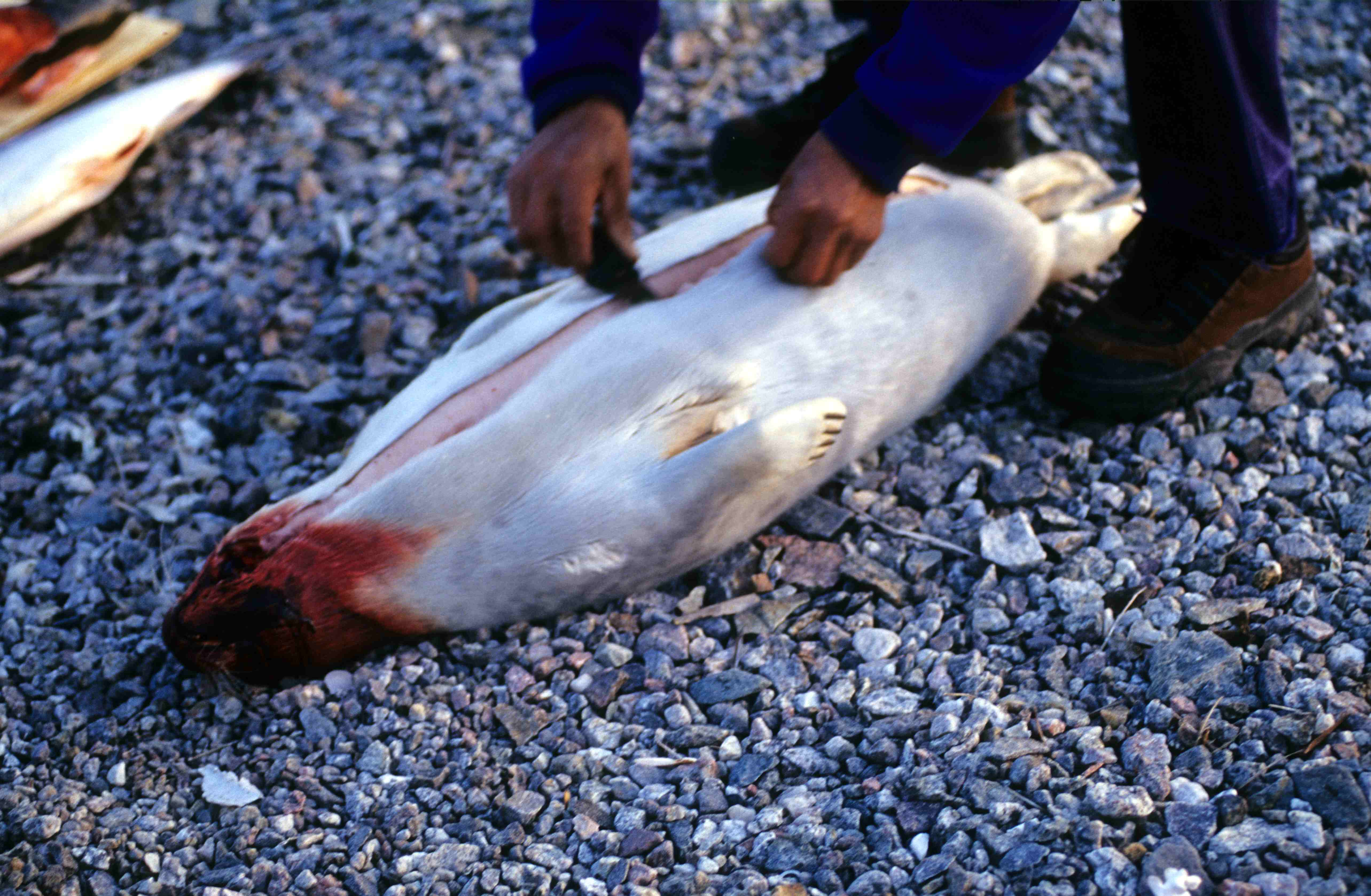
Dressing a ringed seal

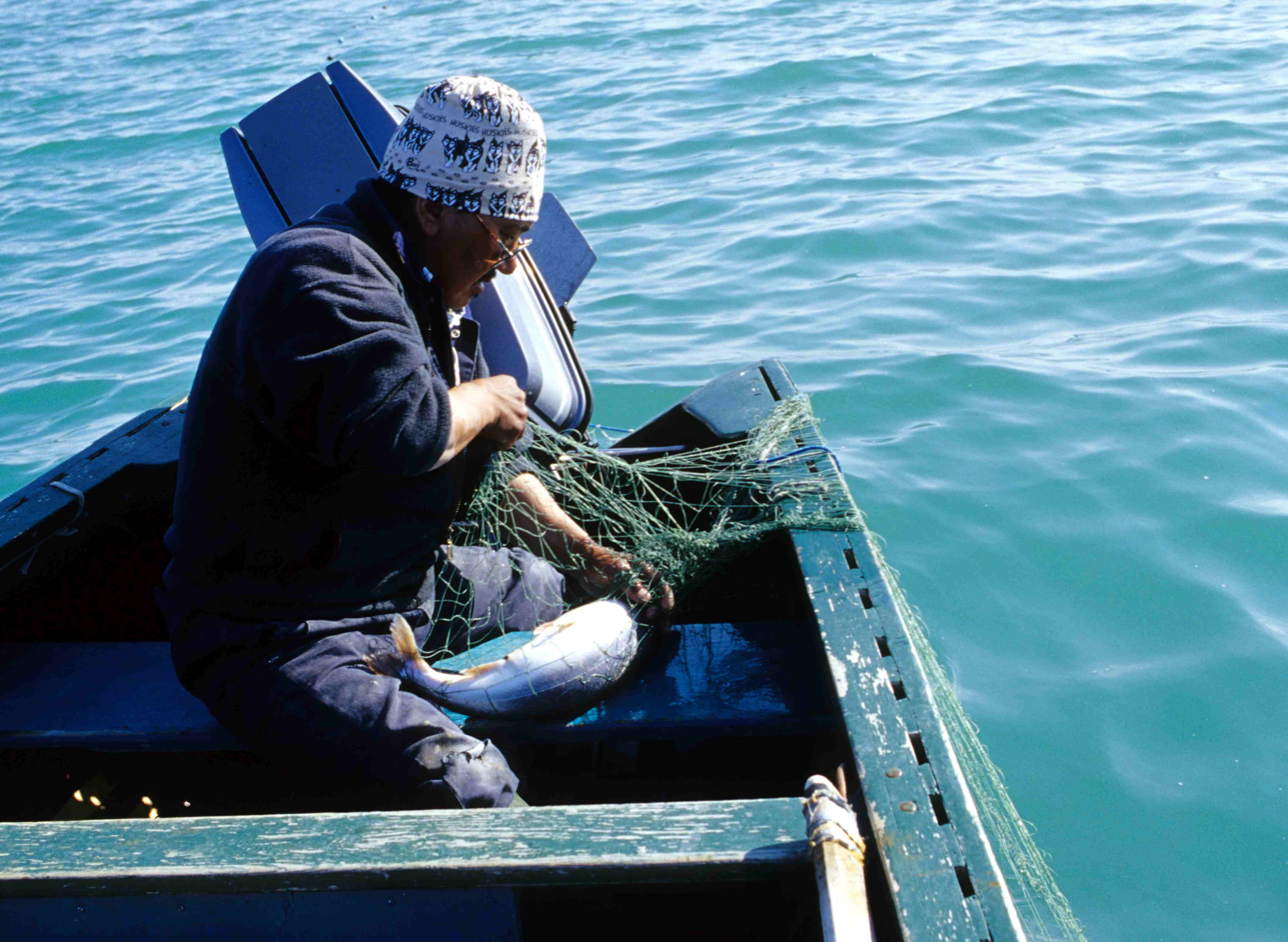
Fishing for Arctic char

In the few months of summer, the people moved camp to the estuaries, because there it was easier to catch the favoured Arctic char, e.g. by using artificial weirs, and the eggs of seabirds. For the inland Inuit, the caribou was the most important resource; it provided meat, a hide for clothing, and sinew for rope. The coastal Inuit hunted mostly seals and walruses and, depending on the region, narwhals and belugas; of course also the occasional caribou. The seals were used for food for men and dogs. Their oil was used for the kudliks, and their skin and sinews for seal boots (kamik), kayak coverings, ropes (also drag ropes for dog sleds) and dog whips.

During the winter, the Inuit lived in igloos, which were erected separately or connected by tunnels. Snow of a specific consistency was necessary to build them. They had the same general interior arrangement as the tents. The most important element was a lowered entrance tunnel, repelling the heavier cold air and the wind from entering inside. As additional prevention against cold, the sleeping area was elevated by a layer of snow as compared to the living area.

Some of the families that wanted to live in permanent camps, built themselves a partially subsurface home of rocks, whale bones, coat and sod, the so-called qarmaq. The construction of such camps is certainly based on the Thule tradition. During the winter, they used qarmaqs, but in summer preferred the more airy tents.

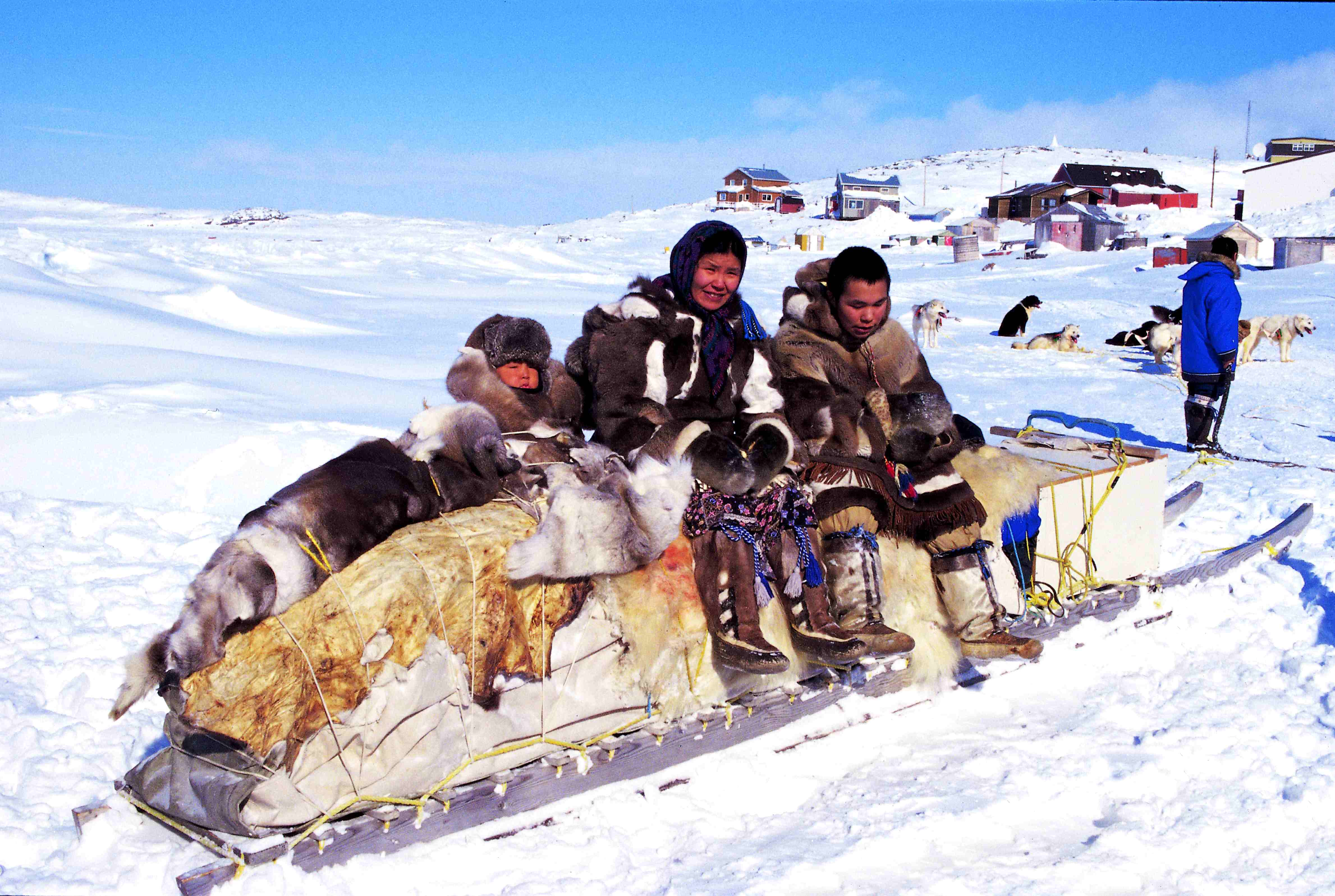
A traditional dog sled (qamutik), today almost entirely replaced by the snowmobile, except for festive occasions.

Due to the hard weather conditions in winter, in this season the families joined closer together. Mutual visits at hunting places of different groups were for the exchange of news and experiences, but mostly for the exchange of food from different sources. In winter, travelling was done by dog sleds, partly presumably also by foot.

During the warmer seasons, mainly the people used the kayak, or, mostly as "women boat" for families, the large umiak, and travelled by foot. Traditional land routes were, e.g., from Wager Bay to Repulse Bay in north, to Chesterfield Inlet with the adjacent Baker Lake in the southwest and to Chantrey Inlet at the Arctic Ocean in the northwest.

== Inuit in Canada ==
=== Transition into the 21st century ===
==== Fundamental change of living conditions ====
Between 1800 and 1950, the culture and way of living of the Canadian Inuit, who had not known any monetary system before, changed fundamentally. Complete self-sufficiency and independence were to a large extent replaced by dependence on goods of western industrialized countries, such as clothing, many kinds of foodstuffs, weapons, tools and technical equipment. This development was largely due to the fact that as hunters and trappers, they could develop only a low level of productivity that could not financially cover the Western way of living. Moreover, the products of the kill depended too much on market and fashion fluctuations, not to speak of concerns related to protection of species and of the environment.

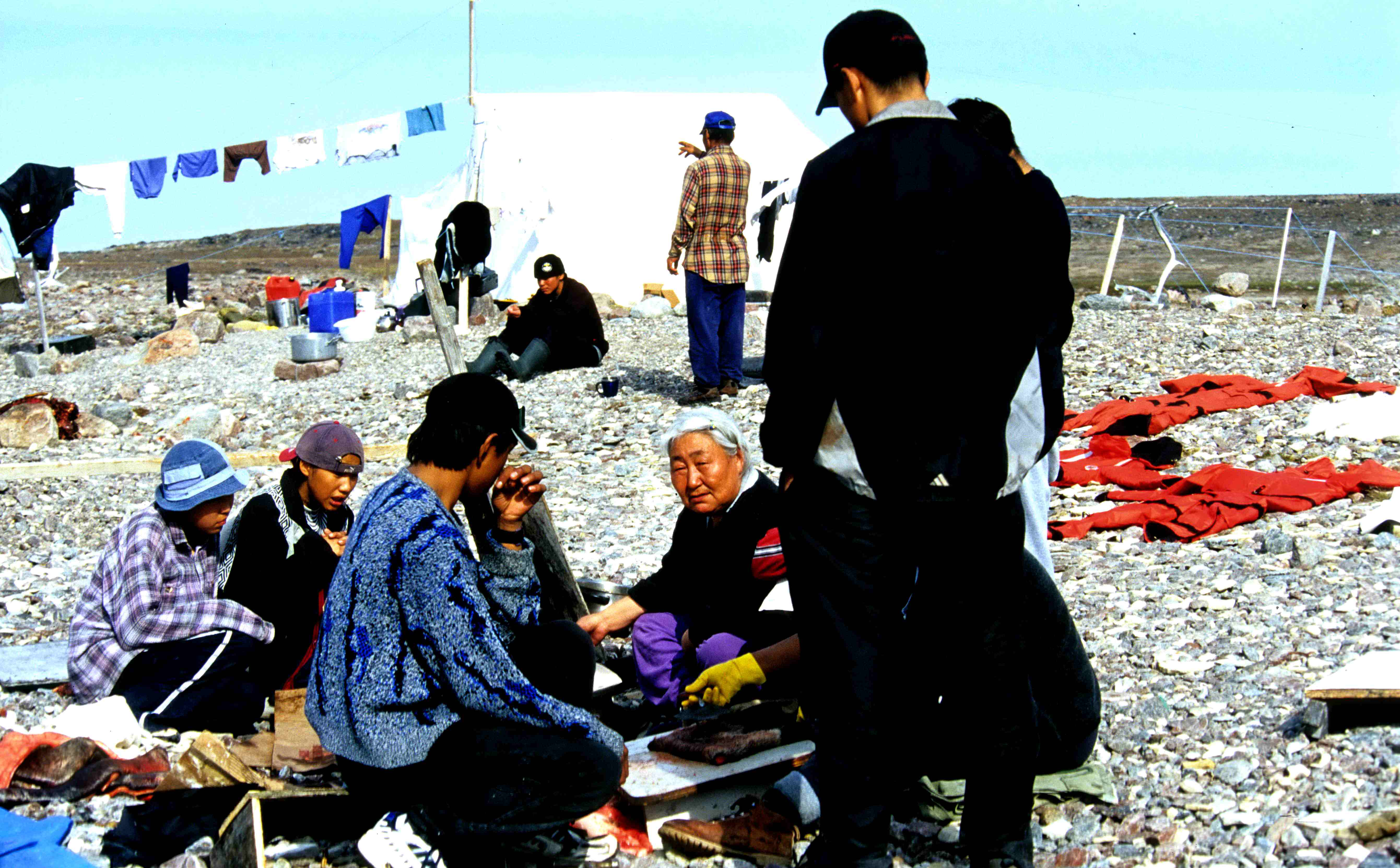
Life on the land, following tradition (Camp Najutaqtujuq, North Baffin Island)

Post–World War II, the northern regions were increasingly incorporated into a Cold War strategic defense concept, and military and radar stations of the Distant Early Warning Line (DEW Line) were established. Although this developed the infrastructure and created jobs, it also led to a sudden urbanization that not every community could adapt to. Traditional ways of living were increasingly constrained and eliminated, with no provision made for the transition to the new way of living. The transitional difficulties were further enhanced, for example, by the fact that at the end of the 1940s, the Kivalliq Region had to be placed under quarantine because of the appearance of serious infectious diseases such as polio (for which there was as yet no vaccine). At the same time, the caribou population west of Hudson Bay nearly perished. As a consequence, the Inuit of that area lost their food supply. Those Inuit still mostly living in camps faced an increasing threat from tuberculosis; many who contracted the disease had to be treated in sanatoriums in the south. Many Inuit tried to continue their traditional way of living in their ancestral regions while adapting to the new conditions. But, they became more dependent on governmental welfare.

The Canadian state had primarily scientific interest in its northern regions during the first half of the century. Beginning in the 1950s, it became concerned about three issues: military security requirements, discovery of economically important natural resources, and an increasing sensibility for the special concerns of the Inuit. The government felt the need to exercise governmental control and sovereignty over the territory. The Canadian government created a Department of Indian Affairs and Natural Resources in 1953 (now Aboriginal Affairs and Northern Development Canada). This department established social benefits such as unemployment aid, social welfare, care of the sick and of the elderly, child allowance, comprehensive educational and welfare programs of the industrial areas of Canada. At the same time, the Canadian government forcibly moved many Inuit families from their traditional hunting grounds into new and empty areas, to reinforce claims of Canadian sovereignty.

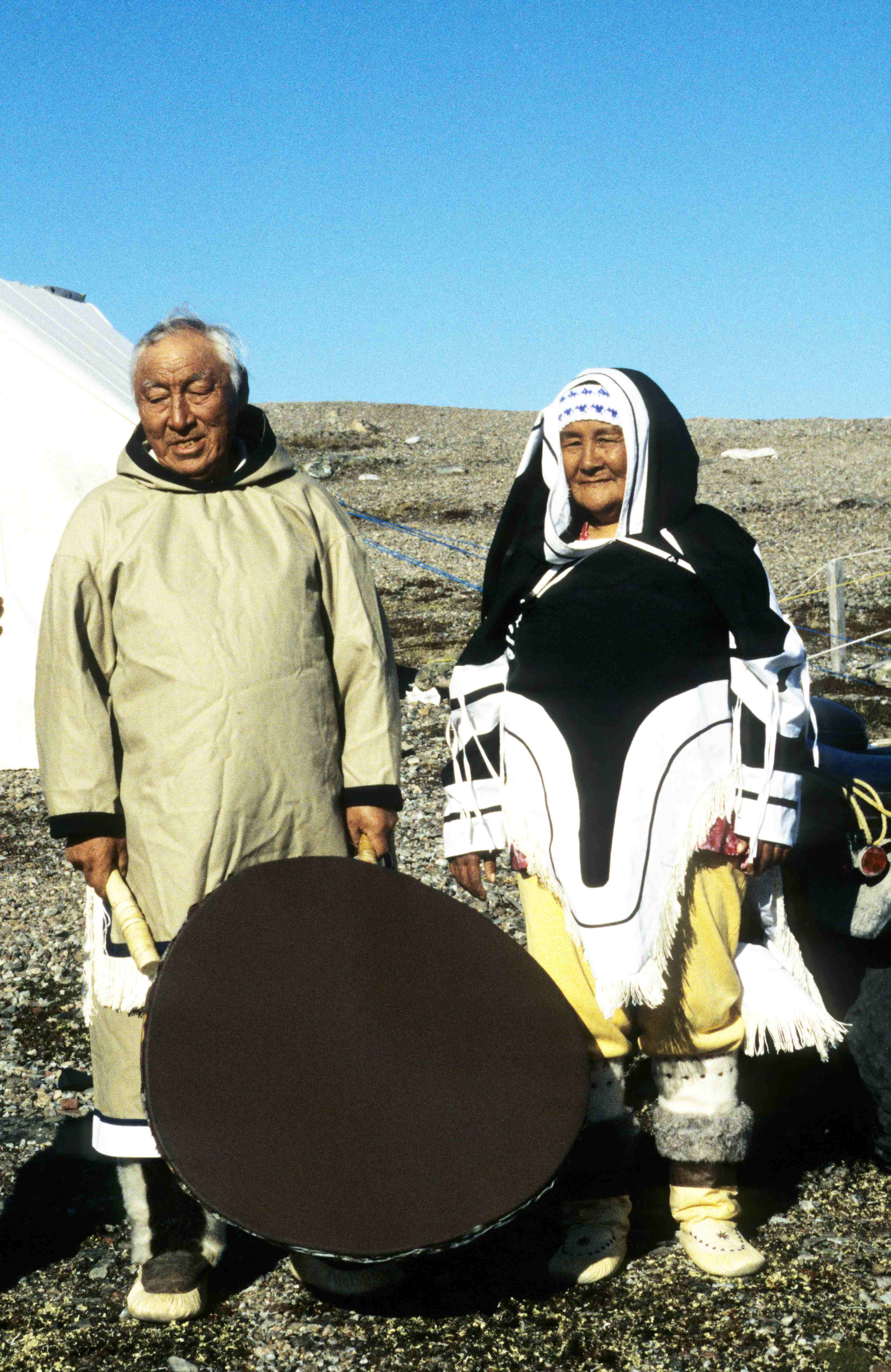
Drum dancer in a Camp near Meliadine River

=== Traditional customs ===
==== Menstruation ====
Traditionally, young Inuit women received little information about puberty, fertility, and pregnancy. Consequently, elders describe that it was not uncommon for young women to remain in bed when they reached menarche, believing that they were sick or physiologically different. Once informed, the young woman's mother would instruct her on menstruation practices and often, the camp (or community) would become apprised of her situation. During menstruation, women were expected to follow certain practices including, 1) not sitting where men sat, 2) using rabbit skin, foxes or mosses and other garments, with the exception of men's garments, for sanitary pads, and 3) laying rabbit skin on the bed at night to soak up blood. According to elders, women had to abide by more rules than men because of their menstruation and some rules were not only considered tradition, but also taboo if not followed. For example, using a man's garment for a sanitary pad could prevent the young woman from finding a husband for marriage.

==== Marriage ====
Marriage commonly occurred when the woman reached 14–15 years of age and the man reached adulthood, considered around 20 years of age. The marriage was traditionally arranged by the parents of the couple, possibly as early as infanthood, and often reflected a desire to strengthen the bond between families. In some parts of the Arctic, men also practised the tradition of "stealing" their wife from a camp, symbolically showing that the family did not want the daughter to leave their camp. In these cases, the family would later celebrate together and the woman would then join the husband's territory.

Before the arrival of Christian missionaries, it was mostly the families who decided which children should marry whom, i.e. arranged marriages. Marriages often served to strengthen family ties, and girls had no say in choosing their partners. Sometimes a young man who had not yet been pledged, sent to the parents of the girl, without being personally present in those negotiations. The wedding was completely unceremonial (the same was true for birthdays). After Christianization, the only change was that now the couples also received Christian marriage ceremonies whenever a priest travelled their areas (often months after the actual marriage). When finally government administration had been established, marriages were also registered by the administration, initially by police officers, later by the local administrations. Since moving from the camps to the settlements, more couples live together without marriage. This way, they feel less tied but also less responsible. Into the 1970s, it was in no way unusual to make agreements regarding newborns about eventual marriages. However, when these promises of marriage became due, fifteen or twenty years later, they were taken less and less seriously.

Before Christianization (referred to as Siqqitiq by the Inuit), polygamy, more often polygyny, less so polyandry, were not unusual among the Inuit. Extramarital relationships were accepted especially during extensive hunting trips, and there were so-called "lamp extinction games" with ritual partner exchanges. According to a popular theory, these traditions reduced the danger of inbreeding and resulting population bottleneck in small and isolated settlements. With colonization, these customs led to great conflicts: on one hand such traditions were thought by missionaries as sinful, on the other, they were interpreted as sexual arbitrariness and taken advantage of, often leading to prostitution and sexual exploitation.

==== Family life ====
The Inuit arrived in North America somewhere between 6000 BC and 2000 BC, they were one of the last groups to arrive to North America.

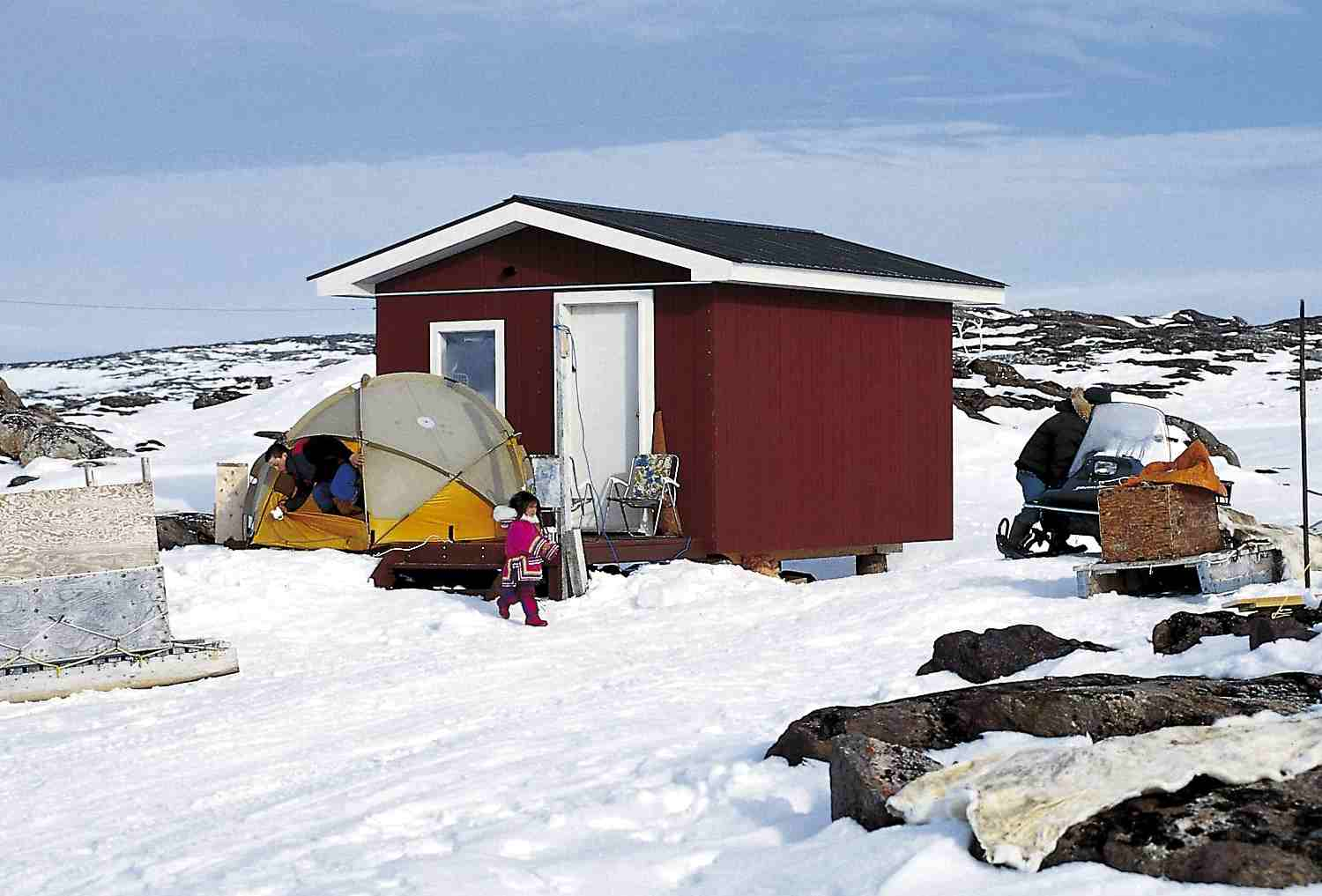
Inuit cabin built for use while on the land hunting and fishing

Until the middle of the 20th century, i.e. until the move from disperse camps to settlements, the sexual division of labour between men and women within the families and family groups in northern Canada was traditionally arranged fairly well, and rather different: The men were responsible for the acquisition of food, especially for hunting and fishing, and for technical work (including the construction of igloos, qarmaqs, and tents). The Inuit women were predominantly in charge of intra-family concerns, such as caring for little children, taking care of the kill (conservation of meat, cleaning of furs, and the like), the sewing of clothing, fire keeping in the qulliq, etc. (their participation in hunting and fishing was limited). Whenever a family lost its breadwinner (for example in an accident), it was usually dependent on support by other families, and the widow was sometimes adopted as an additional wife by a close relative of the deceased (see widow inheritance).

However, due to men being required to sometimes travel large distances to obtain food the division was not absolute. Men, for example, would need to know how to sew in case repairs were needed to their clothing. At the same time, women were required to know how to hunt and be able to help with igloo building.

The move from the camps to the settlements, which essentially took place during the 1950s, brought about significant changes in this respect: The Inuit now were immediate subjects of governmental administration and care (also social welfare). By occupations that were completely new to them, like in health care and local administration, but also in Inuit arts, the women with their earned money were able to contribute like the men to the livelihood of their families. Nowadays, the division of tasks and responsibilities between male and female Inuit are, following Canadian legislation, not very different from western industrialized nations, of which the Inuit are considered a part. In the Northwest Territories the first female premier was Nellie Cournoyea, an Inuk. In Nunavut, female representatives and ministers are as common as their male counterparts. There are Inuit municipalities with female mayors, for example.

=== Health disparities ===
Nunavummiut, 85% of whom identify as Inuit, experience wide gaps in health status and access. The people of Nunavut have a life expectancy which is more than 14 years shorter than the Canadian average (66.8 years vs. 81 years). This is likely affected by its astonishingly high suicide rate, which is eleven times the national average. Smoking rates in Nunavut are more than double the national average. The fertility rate is more than twice as high (3.3 vs. 1.5 nationally). Of particular concern in Nunavut is rapid urbanization and subsequent overcrowding, with many homes without improved sanitation facilities. Food insecurity is another concern, with nearly 57% of children living in food insecure households as measured by University of Toronto researchers. This dovetails with Nunavut's high obesity rate, which stands at 45.4%- more than twice the national average of 21.8%.

=== The context of birth ===
The Second World War and subsequent Cold War initiated a newfound interest in the Arctic by the Canadian government. Its vast mineral resources and strategic proximity to the USSR brought rapid development to the region. The study of the Inuit's health outcomes also began, finding vast health disparities between northern and southern Canadians. This prompted the opening of several nursing outposts in the Northwest Territories, including what is now Nunavut to provide primary and some secondary care to the Inuit population. These proved successful, and several studies found that Inuit had better access to primary care than many southern Canadians. To aid in maternity care, the government in Ottawa began recruiting midwives from England and New Zealand to work in the Arctic regions, which preserved the woman-centred midwifery model of care practiced by the traditional Inuit midwives. However, this was short-lived due to more stringent immigration laws passed in the 1970s. The physicians recruited to replace these midwives advocated for a medicalized, tertiary-care level birth, and a de facto policy of flying women to southern hospitals for labour and delivery was adopted. In the 1970s and 1980s, nearly 100% of pregnant women were flown out of their homeland to give birth. The most popular routes—from north to Yellowknife, Ottawa, Ontario; Churchill, Manitoba; or Winnipeg, Manitoba could be more than 1,000 miles.

So common was the fly out to give birth that Inuit culture began to adapt to this almost inevitable fact. To announce a newborn member of their community, many Inuit proclaim "the newborn has arrived" instead of "the baby is born". Due to the fact that the infant is several weeks old when it arrives in its homeland, it is common for members of the community to shake the baby's hand to welcome them to the community.

In the early 21st century, about half of Inuit women are flown out from Nunavut to southern hospitals for delivery, and evacuations consume more than 20% of the territory's health budget. They normally leave two to three weeks prior to their due date and return two to three weeks after birth. There are reports of Inuit women returning home after more than one month away to find their house in ruins and their other children poorly cared for. Inuit culture is closely tied to the land and community, and birth outside of this land causes cultural dissonance. Many Inuit women interviewed about the practice remarked that their children born outside of Nunangat were not truly Inuit. Some communities, such as Cambridge Bay, have a birthing centre available for low risk births and in 2014 two local women graduated from Nunavut Arctic College's midwifery program. The centre is available for all communities in the Kitikmeot Region. However, higher risk and first-time mothers must still go to the hospital in Yellowknife.

=== Pregnancy behaviours and beliefs ===
==== Pregnancy ====
Young Inuit women were discouraged from engaging in sexual intercourse until they reached "prime maternity age", after marriage, about 15. Once aware, it was important that the woman immediately divulge her pregnancy status to her mother, husband, and close community, as the Inuit believed that her status demanded special considerations and/or treatment to ensure the health of mother, baby, and camp. To prevent miscarriage, the husband and camp were to assure that the woman did not become mentally stressed or exhausted during the pregnancy.

In pregnancy, women's care was traditionally guided by the taboos, known as pittailiniq, from the elders in the community. These taboos informed the woman's behaviors and activities in order to prevent complications, promote a healthy birth, and ensure desired characteristics of the infant. For example, in regards to activity, the Inuit had many pittailiniq about maintaining physical activity throughout pregnancy and resisting idleness or laziness, which was believed to adversely affect labour and birth. Another common pittailiniq instructed the woman to massage her stomach until she felt the fetus move, so that the baby wouldn't "stick" to the uterus.

- Diet in pregnancy

The Inuit also followed many taboos (pittailiniq) about diet and consumption in pregnancy. Consistently, elders report that pregnant women were to abstain from raw meat, eating only boiled or cooked meat, during pregnancy. Men were also expected to observe this rule, but only when in the presence of their wives. The preferential treatment of pregnant women also extended to food, and the best pieces of meat and food were always reserved for the pregnant woman.

The pittailiniq regarding the diet of pregnant women demonstrate the strong emphasis on maternal diet affecting infant beauty and/or appearance. Some of these pittailiniq are listed below.

==== Birth ====
According to elders, the women were not taught how to prepare for birth. Women expected and trusted that they would receive instruction and advice from their midwife and other birth attendants (i.e. mother and/or mother-in-law) during the event.

According to elders, birth ideally occurred with both an assistant and midwife, but due to hunting-based economy/survival, many births occurred in transit or at a hunting camp. In these cases, the elders report that either the men would assist or the woman would endure birth alone. Due to the uncertainty of their location at the time of birth, the woman was often unaware of who her midwife was until birth.

In the community, a midwife (Kisuliuq, Sanariak) or "maker" was a highly revered female member of the community, who had acquired experience and skills in birth by attending births with their mother, an elder, or other midwife of the community; often beginning at young age.

Labour and birth were times of great celebration in the Inuit community. Traditionally, when a woman began having contractions, her midwife would gather other women of the community to help the labouring woman through the birthing process. Very often, women were expected to continue their daily chores up until the late stages of labour and endure labour pains without the aid of pain management.

In traditional Inuit birth culture, the birth event was handled almost exclusively by the midwife. However, the woman played an active role in her own birth experience and was encouraged to follow her body's own physiologic cues regarding pushing and rest.

Sources on traditional Inuit birth practices provide little reference to the postpartum period.

In regards to physical care after birth, the information is also minimal. Women, who are able to breastfeed, do so immediately after birth, often continuing for two years or longer. Breastfeeding served as their only method of contraception and birth spacing.

=== The newborn ===
The birth of a newborn into the camp is cause for widespread celebration in the community and everyone, including children, would shake hands at its arrival.

Also occurring immediately after birth, a designated person, often the midwife, felt the infant's genitalia to determine its gender. This person then became the infant's sanaji (for an infant boy) or arnaliaq (for an infant girl) and assumed a lifelong role in the child's life. If the infant was a boy, he would later call this person his arnaquti and give her his first catch as a child. The sanaji was also responsible for cutting the umbilical cord, providing the infant's first clothes, naming the child (tuqurausiq), blessing the child (kipliituajuq) and conferring the desired characteristics onto the child.

In rare instances, the child might be considered sipiniq (Inuktitut: ᓯᐱᓂᖅ), meaning the infant is believed to have changed their physical sex from male to female at the moment of birth. This concept has primarily been historically attested in areas of the Canadian Arctic, such as Igloolik and Nunavik.

Once assessed by the midwife and/or sanaji, the infant was promptly given to the mother for initiation of breastfeeding. According to elders, the infant remained in nearly constant physical contact with their mother from the day of birth; sleeping on the family platform, riding in the amauti (baby carrier on the mother), or nestled in her parka for feeding.

==== Naming the newborn ====
Performed by the sanaji or midwife, the tuqurausiq was the highly valued naming practice that linked the child to a relative or deceased family friend. The Inuit believed that when the infant was born, they took on the soul or spirit of a recently deceased relative or community member. Through the name, the child literally assumed the relationship of their namesake. For example, if a child were named for someone's mother, family members would then call that child "mother" and give the child the same respect given to that mother. In addition, as the infant or child is a representative of their namesake, they are considered to generally know what they want or need. Given this belief, it was also considered inappropriate to tell an infant or child what to do, as it was similar to commanding an elder or another adult, which violated social rule in Inuit culture. Children in the 21st century are still named for other family members but the name may be an English one rather than a traditional Inuit name.

==== Newborn outcomes ====
Compared with non-Inuit Canadians, Inuit have higher fertility rates, higher prevalence of births to mothers age 15–19 years, and worse birth outcomes. According to 2012 government statistics, the Inuit population has an infant mortality rate of 26.3 deaths per 1,000 live births, as compared to 4.1 deaths per 1,000 live births in the larger Canadian population. In addition, the Inuit experience a neonatal death rate of 9 deaths per 1,000 live births, versus 4 deaths per 1,000 live births in the Canadian population.

=== Push for a return to community birth ===
Beginning in the late 1970s and 1980s, women in Nunavut and the other areas of Nunangat began a push to end the practice of being flown to the south of Canada (Douglas- Rankin Inlet). This was based on a widely held belief in the region that birth of Inuit children within the Inuit homeland would strengthen the family unit and increase social cohesion. A large anthropological study confirmed strong correlations between the social dissonance caused by birth evacuation and a spectrum of social ills facing Inuit society. Furthermore, Inuit women wanted to return to their traditional practice of woman-centred midwifery, using knowledge passed down through the generations to complement a community-centred birthing experience. In 2008, the government of Nunavut passed the Midwifery Professions Act. This far-reaching provision extended a full scope of practice regarding prenatal, birth, postpartum, and primary care to registered midwives. The act also permitted Nunavut Arctic College to open a midwifery-training program, the curriculum of which is required to include traditional Inuit midwifery knowledge.

==== Birth centres in Nunavut ====
In 1993, the first birth centre in Nunavut opened its doors in Rankin Inlet. Heralded as a first step in returning birth to the North, the Rankin Inlet Birth Centre was a fledgling operation for most of its first decade. Today, more than half of Nunavummiut women give birth in southern hospitals- mostly in Yellowknife, Churchill or Ottawa. Only about 20% of the women in the surrounding Kivalliq region of central Nunavut give birth in the centre and less than half (47%) of the births of Rankin Inlet itself take place there. Its marginal success has been linked to its relatively low capacity, having only two maternity care workers employed there at any one time- both of whom are almost always southern Canadian midwives there on short-term assignments. The birth centre has handled approximately 600 births since its opening. A University of Manitoba audit in 2008 found that the centre has provided consistently safe maternity care since its opening, with not one case of maternal mortality.

A second birth centre is housed within the Qikiqtani Hospital in Iqaluit. The Qikiqtani birth centre handles the majority of births, which occur in Nunavut, about 400 per year. The centre, opened in 2007, houses four birthing suites and a full surgical backup should the woman need it. The centre is equipped to handle breech, VBAC, and other complicated vaginal births using a physician-led team as well as midwives. At eight percent, the centre's cesarean rate is the lowest of any hospital in country. The Qikitqtani birth centre has reduced the evacuation rate on Baffin Island considerably, and there is little need for low-risk women to leave the territory to give birth. The centre's intervention rate is lower than the national average and is considered a model for the rest of the territory.

=== Death ===
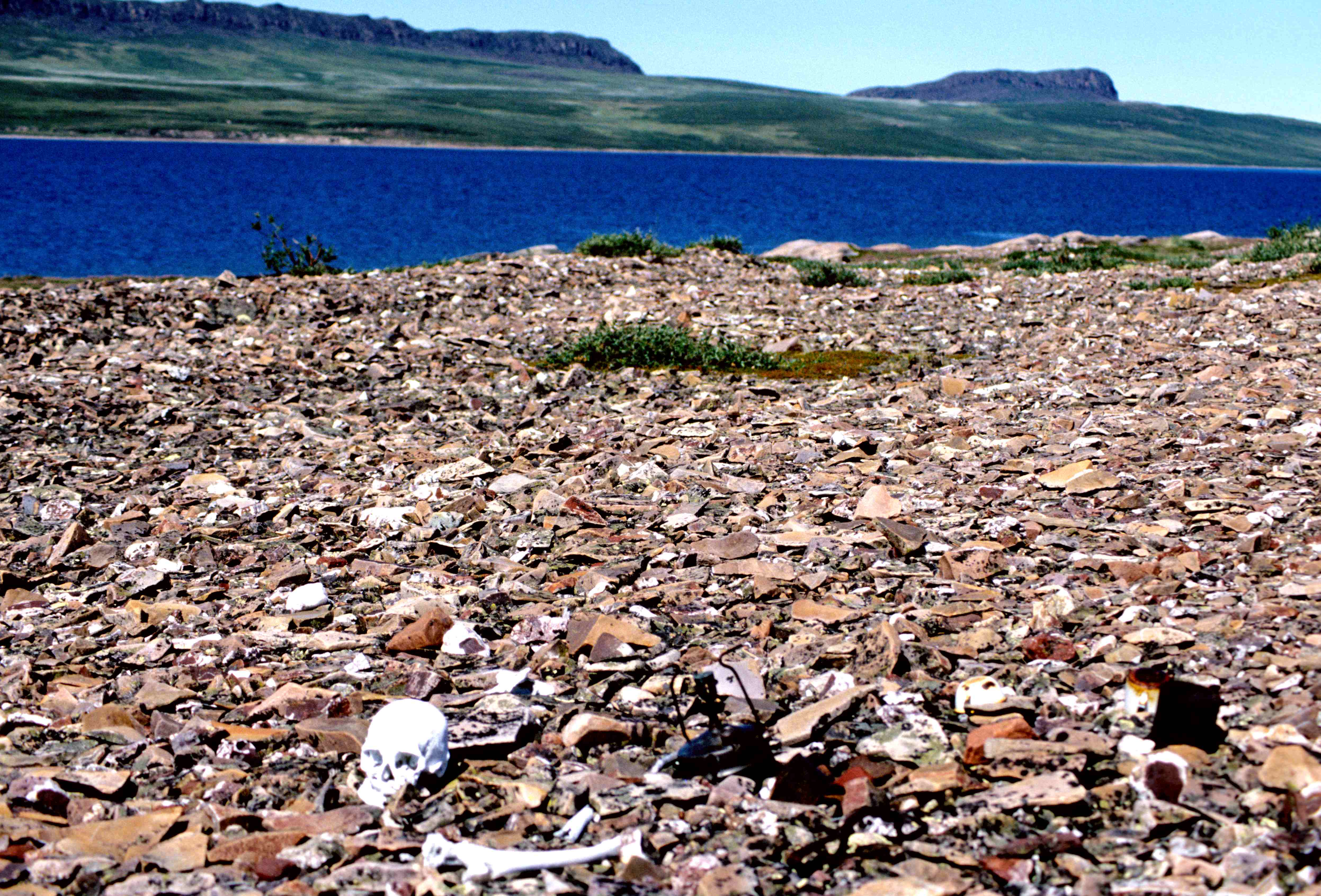
Human remains on a beach near Bathurst Inlet

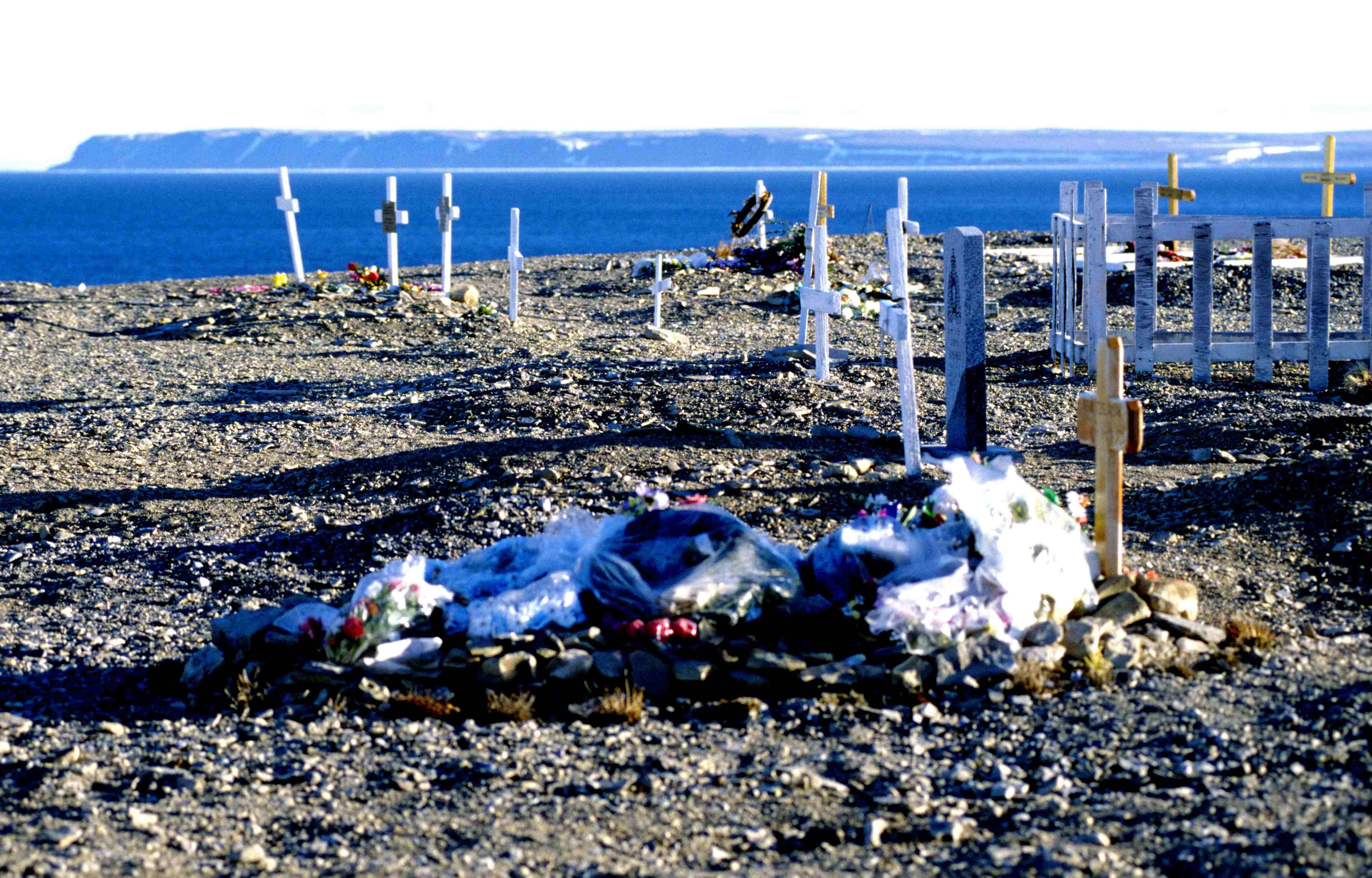
Cemetery of Resolute on the Barrow Strait (Parry Channel)

When the Inuit still lived in camps or as nomads, they had no special tomb sites, much less cemeteries. Before burial, the women of the camp washed the body of the deceased and adjusted the hair; on dead women they braided the hair starting at the forehead. Then they wrapped the body in a large blanket of caribou hide or wool and laid it down far out in the tundra, face up. They stacked cairns on top, to protect the body from scavengers. Nevertheless, scattered human bones can be found throughout the tundra, testifying to the work of carnivores.

Similar burial customs have been found through the centuries. For example, Qilakitsoq mummies dating from 500 years ago show that the Thule people, ancestors of the Inuit, wrapped and protected their dead the same way.

The Inuit believed the aurora borealis to be visible signals from the dead or the spirits of the dead. Some believed that whistling would bring the lights to earth where they would remove the whistlers head for use as a football. In some areas Inuit children feared the ghosts of those deceased long ago and often whistled or blew air against their hands, in order to "blow away" those supernatural beings. In other areas, such as eastern Greenland, the aurora were the spirits of dead children. In pre-missionary times it was usual to give a newborn child the name of a close relative who had died shortly before. This way, ancestors could experience a kind of return to a new life in the child. This custom has survived to this day, although the traditional animism religion has largely given way to Christianity.

Since the move to the settlements, the dead are buried in cemeteries. All members of the community participate in requiems that last for hours, during which the towns appear deserted. Due to the frozen permafrost, burial sites are not deep, and are covered with rocks. Sometimes a blue plastic layer can be detected between the rocks. Here and there, a wooden box with a vitrified cover a few fading artificial flowers and other decorations can be seen. Crosses stand askew on the shifting permafrost. The inscriptions show that many of the dead are children, victims of accidents or natural disasters, and also suicides. Infrequently, there is a wooden hut outside of the town, where those that died during the winter are preserved in natural cold, until the warmer season permits their burial.

=== Challenges created by a changed way of life ===
Given such changes in their way of life, keeping their own identity and recollection of history and ancestors proved to be an extraordinary challenge many Inuit could not meet. These changes led to alcohol and drug problems. The suicide rate of the Inuit rose four times as high as that of the remaining population of Canada.

In the early 21st century the infant mortality rate is still high, about four times higher than the rest of Canada, and the lifespan relatively short, about 13 years less than the rest of the country. However, the Inuit population has grown considerably since the 1960s when there were about 12,000 and, as of the 2016 Canadian census, increasing to just over 65,025, distributed among some 70 settlements, some of which have a population of a few hundred only. They account for about 0.142% of the total population of Canada, and about 4% of the indigenous population, as of 2011. From 2006 to 2016, the Inuit population grew by 29.1% and the total Aboriginal population has grown by 42.5%—more than four times the growth rate of the non-Aboriginal population over the same period.

Within a very short time, modern technology replaced methods and technologies that had been passed on for centuries. Firearms replaced lances and harpoons, snowmobiles, mainly Polaris, Ski-Doo and Yamaha took the place of dog sled teams (the name Ski-Doo is often used for the whole category, since Joseph-Armand Bombardier 1922 built the first snowmobile, Ski-Dog, which mutated to Ski-Doo by a typographical error). ATVs (all-terrain vehicles, quad-bikes) became widely accepted as a general means of transportation.

The Inuit have become consumers who make their living by fishing, hunting, trapping and production of artwork. They also perform wage labour, and often must be supported by additional social welfare. Government support is often the only source of income. The number of recipients is much higher than the average of Canada. Also, the share of employees in public service is 20 to 30 percent, compared to 7 percent for Canada. This is extremely high, and has been rising even higher since the creation of Nunavut. Nowadays only a few areas are left where traditional methods of hunting and fishing have been preserved in their original form.

==== Adjustment to conditions of living in a modern industrial nation ====
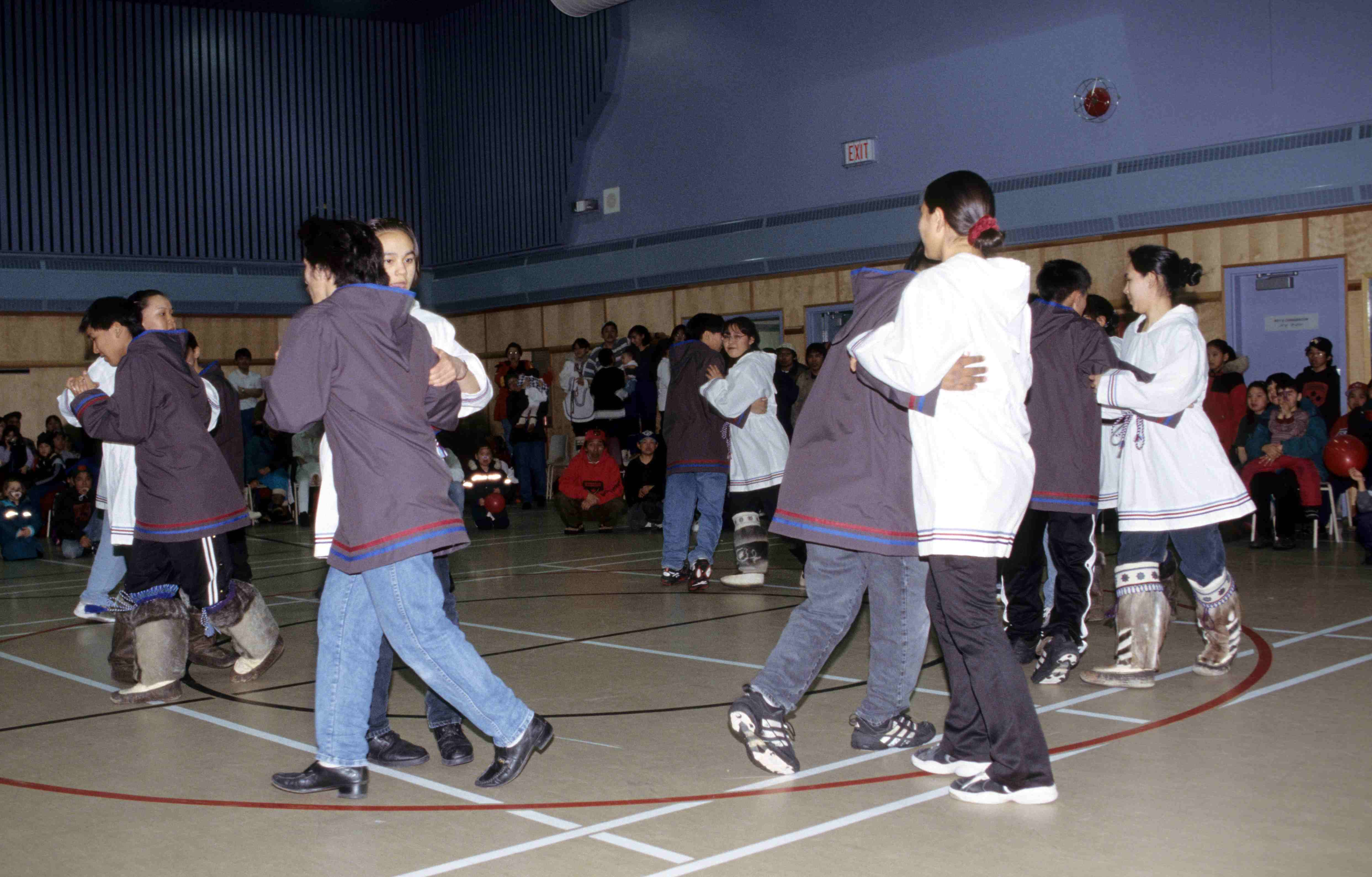
Square Dance from the time of Scottish whalers, which today the Inuit dance in many variations

The capitalist way of thinking in the south of Canada has been a large challenge for the Inuit. It was a drastic experience for the population of a homogeneous, that in an earning-focused, achievement-oriented society authority, power and wealth were defined in a very different way. Before, they were independent in their way of living, but now they saw themselves tied to the chains of a monetary system. Consequently, new patterns of behavior arose, which put enormous strain on family ties. The adjustment to totally different conditions of living, even more so in new administrative centres that were organized by Canadian public employees by the rules of an industrialized country, was understandably difficult for the Inuit. Many have not come to terms with the changes to this day; they do not feel part of either the modern culture nor of that of their ancestors.

The proselytizing by the Anglican Church and the Roman Catholic Church in the first half of the 20th century, which must be critically viewed in some respect, was also of fundamental significance for the cultural change of the Inuit. Although the Arctic nowadays is considered largely Christian, elements of Shamanism appear to persist fairly well at the subliminal level, side by side with Christian thought, despite its condemnation by the missionaries.

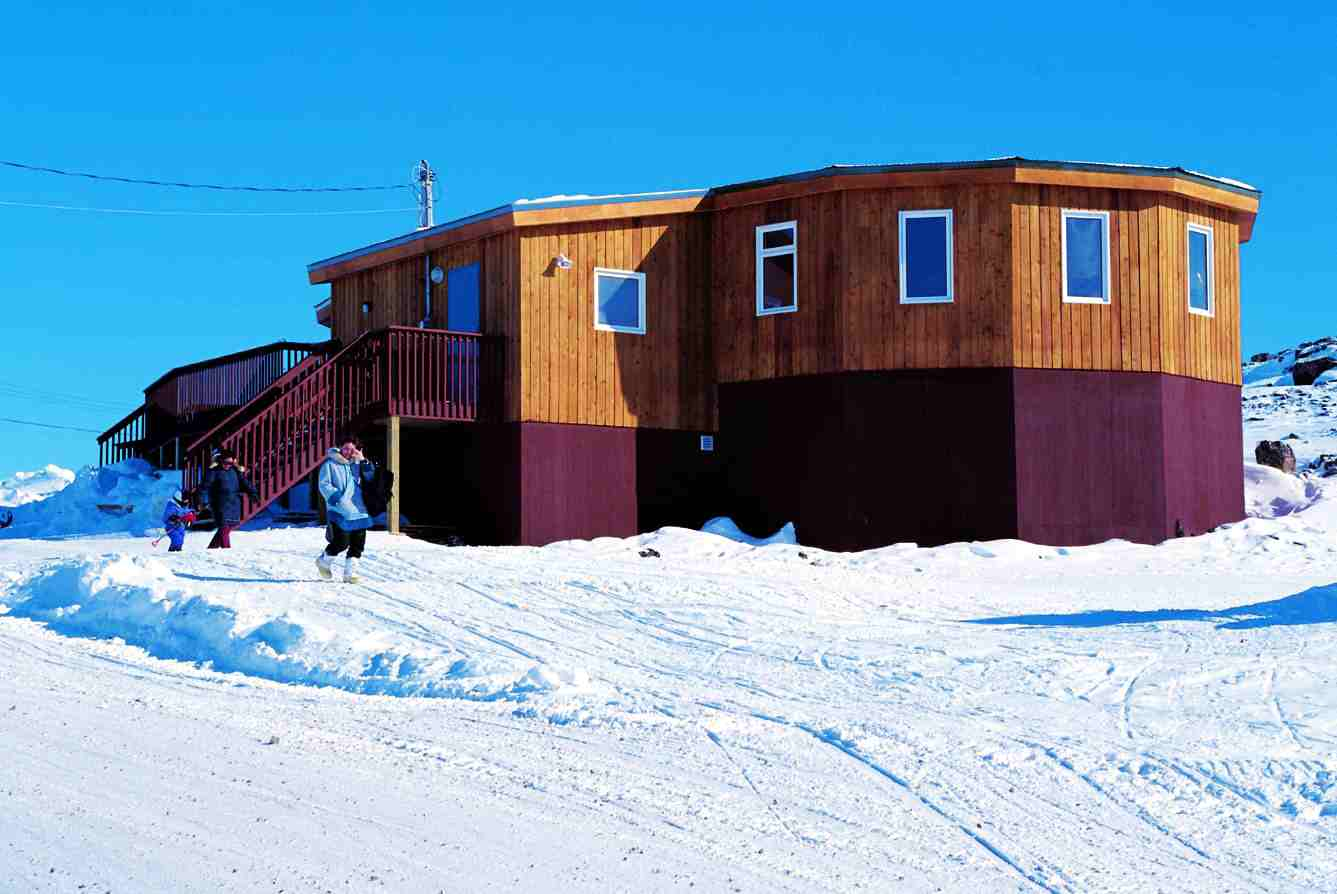
Day Care Centre, (Cape Dorset)

The adjustment to life in a modern industrialized country is easier for the young people who find new types of opportunities, but also all the problems that can be paraphrased by the keyword "TV culture". Compulsory education was introduced in the 1950s, replacing the traditional master-apprentice relationship between parents and children that did without reading and writing skills. Some Inuit were trained to be teachers and clergymen, but their numbers still were much too low. Basic education nowadays takes place in nearly all settlements. In Nunavut during the first three school years, the Inuit language, either Inuinnaqtun or Inuktitut, is the relevant language of instruction. In many schools of the Arctic, "elders", older residents who are recognized for their experience, are teaching the traditional knowledge, known as Inuit Qaujimajatuqangit, about culture, customs and way of living from the pre-settlement time, during planned lectures. Despite all efforts, the number of dropout is generally rather high, because of lack of motivation, among other reasons.

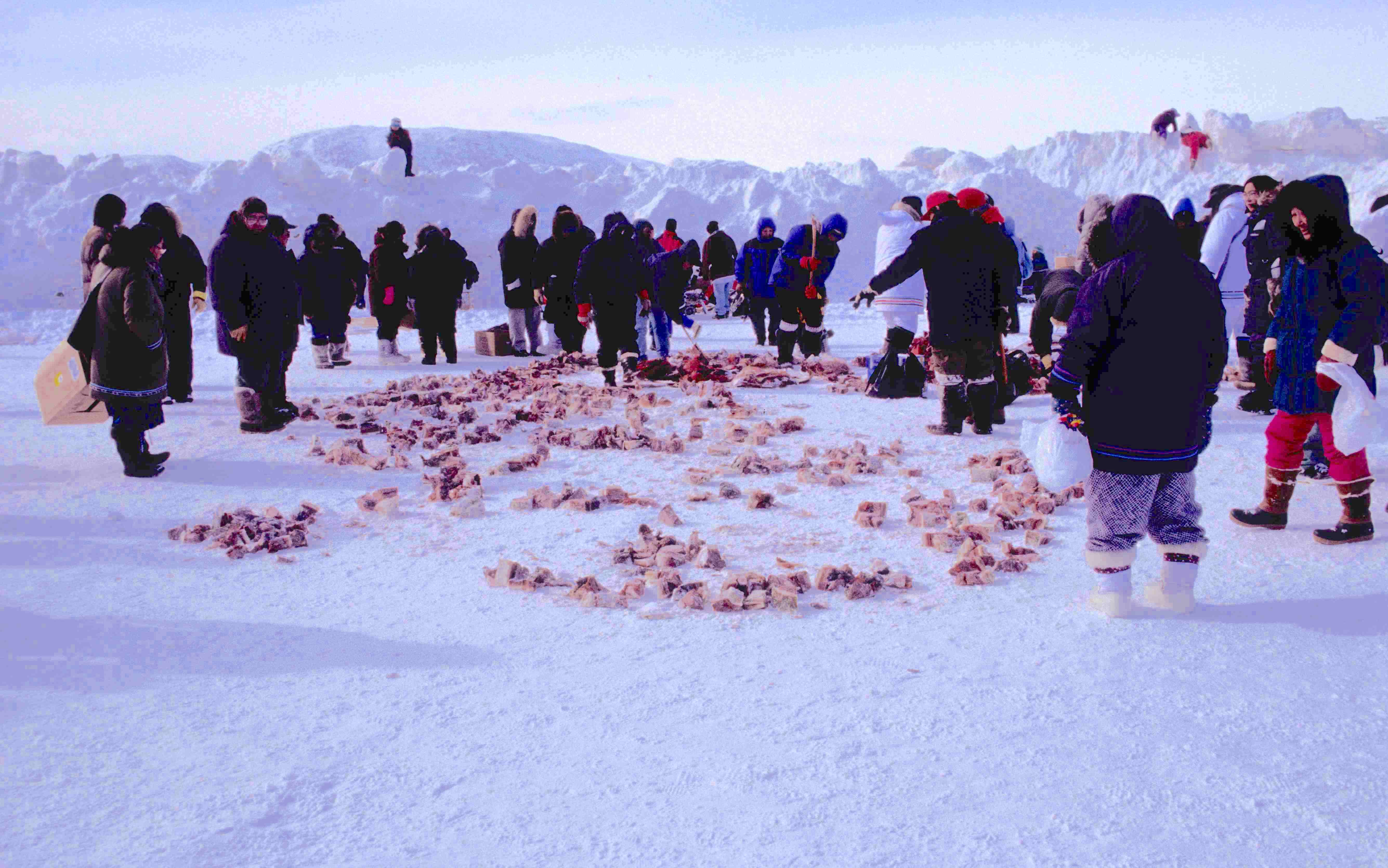
Distribution of frozen, fermented walrus meat

As part of the Government of Canada's assimilation policy many Inuit children, along with First Nations, were sent to residential schools. Children were taken from their home communities in the summer and sent to a school in a centralized area where they would remain for an entire school year. These included Sir Alexander Mackenzie Day School in Inuvik which included the two residences, Stringer Hall for Anglicans and Grollier Hall for Catholics, and Chesterfield Inlet Indian Residential School which included the Turquetil residence. The year away from their homes caused multiple problems upon return. Children were not permitted to speak their native language while at school and thus had problems communicating to community members who spoke little or no English. At the same time the loss of traditional skills meant they were less able to occupy the roles that they would have normally taken up.

Later in the 1970s schools were built in the communities but most did not go beyond grade 7/8. Therefore, this meant leaving the home town during the school year, which was very difficult for many, to attend high school. However, this was at the parents' and child's choice rather than forced schooling. Because of this, there were only a few Inuit with higher education, since they would have to leave during the years of study. In the 21st century all Inuit communities in the Northwest Territories and Nunavut offer schooling up to grade 12. This has increased the graduation rate but it still below that of the rest of Canada.

In the NWT Aurora College and Arctic College in Nunavut offer education programs throughout the territories. These include the Nunavut Teacher Education Program which graduates primary, junior and high school teachers with a Bachelor of Education degree and the Akitsiraq Law School program. Some programs, such as general upgrading, are offered in the home community while others are only available in certain places.

There has been no lack of intensive effort to find ways for the Inuit into a largely self-designed future, and to help them with a recollection of their own values and of their personal identity. It was important in this context to convey a new role of men and women. In the past, the man was responsible for family life and survival, while the women in the camp were charged with the young. Now often both of them have to master new tasks, thereby skipping several stages of development, with this process taking a course different from what happened in the European cultural area. It is not seldom that the woman assumes the sole role of the breadwinner, while the man is unemployed.

==== Cooperatives, a formula for success ====
Big hopes were put into the establishment of cooperatives, today the Arctic Co-operatives Limited, that were to help convey to the Inuit the skills of creating added value, so they would take care of themselves again and at the same time preserve their traditional culture. These cooperatives, mostly managed by Qallunaat (non-Inuit), did in fact prove very successful, because they succeeded in connecting economic thinking with traditional activities and values not only theoretically.

The cooperatives developed activities in disparate areas. They were active in the provisioning of goods and services, such as trading with oil, gas, gasoline and construction materials, the organization of supermarkets with foodstuffs, clothing and technical goods, of hotels and restaurants, the construction of recreational and tourism facilities. On the regional level, the cooperatives ran commercial fur trade and fishing, as well as the production of downs and feathers.

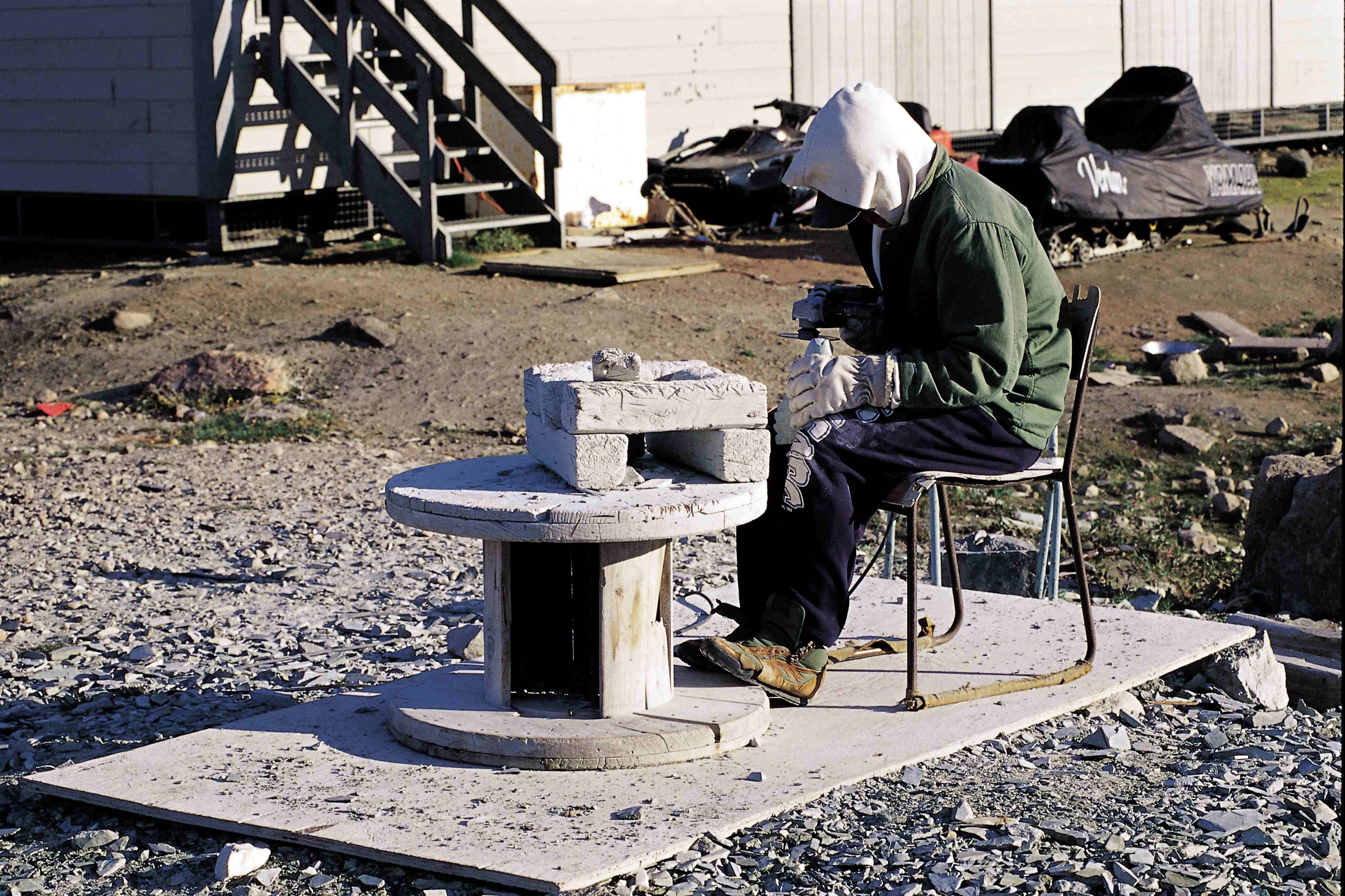
Stone carver in front of his house

In the area of culture, the cooperatives and similar associations were intensely devoted to fostering artistic skills, which were, and still are unusually pronounced among the Inuit. The production and trade of Inuit art, i.e. of artistic and crafted objects, mainly sculptures made from serpentine, soapstone and marble, and soon afterwards also of graphics (drawings, lithotomies, lithographs, erasures) and tapestry (for example hangings), yielded excellent economic and cultural successes.

In the course of the past 50 years this branch of the cooperatives reached an extraordinary importance for value added in the Inuit regions, and clearly ranks first, far ahead of trading hunting products: antlers, fur, or ivory, but overproduction is a growing problem. There is a similar problem with this type of art in Greenland, like the tupilaqs from East Greenland made from walrus ivory.

In 1965, the turnover of Inuit cooperatives with trade of artistic objects and true arts was still below 100,000 Canadian dollars, but two or three decades later it has risen to $5 million, at gross prices, respectively (turnover not registered is estimated at a few additional million dollars). Despite manifold attempts in expanding the areas of activity, real added value still occurs mainly in the consumer goods sector, and scarcely in the real branch of production.

=== Current developments ===
During a period of five thousand years, the Inuit groups have grown apart ethnically. However, the increasing integration into nations foreign to them that were extending into the Arctic made them realize after World War II that they could maintain their cultural identity only if they appeared united at the international level. Therefore, the Eskimo groups of Canada united with their relatives in Alaska and Greenland (after the dissolution of the Soviet Union also with the Siberian Chukchi) to the "Pan-Eskimo Movement". This movement is supported by the Inuit Circumpolar Council, that was founded in 1977 as the Inuit Circumpolar Conference after a lead time of four years and to which its protagonist Eben Hopson (North Slope Borough, Alaska) was invited with his vision of constituting a unified, independent Eskimo nation.

During the 1980s and 1990s a nationalistic trend could indeed be felt, and there was no lack of wishful thinking to achieve the dream of circumpolar unity. But in the reality of daily life, rational and last but not least fiscal thinking prevailed.

==== Nunavut ====
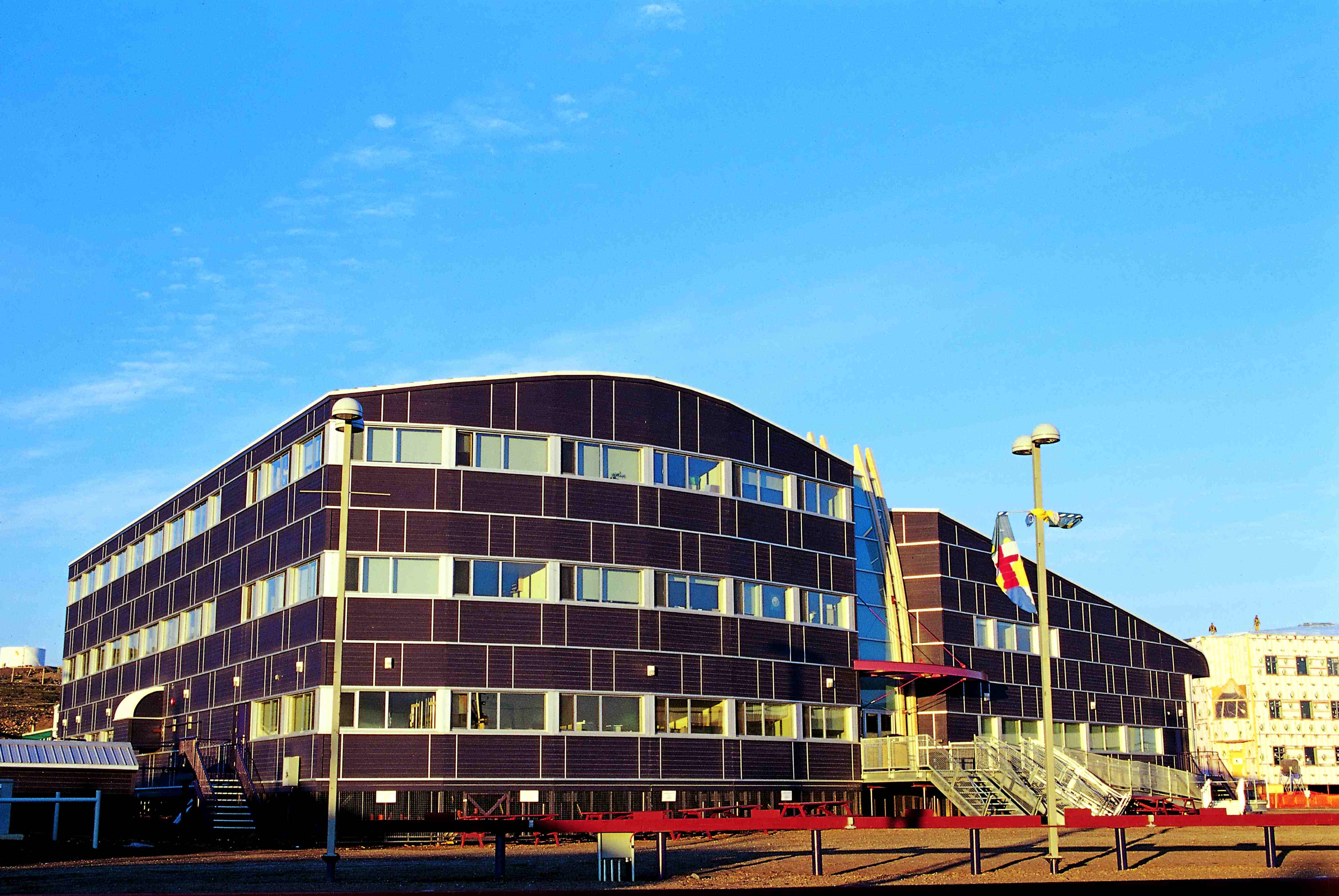
Nunavut Parliament building in Iqaluit

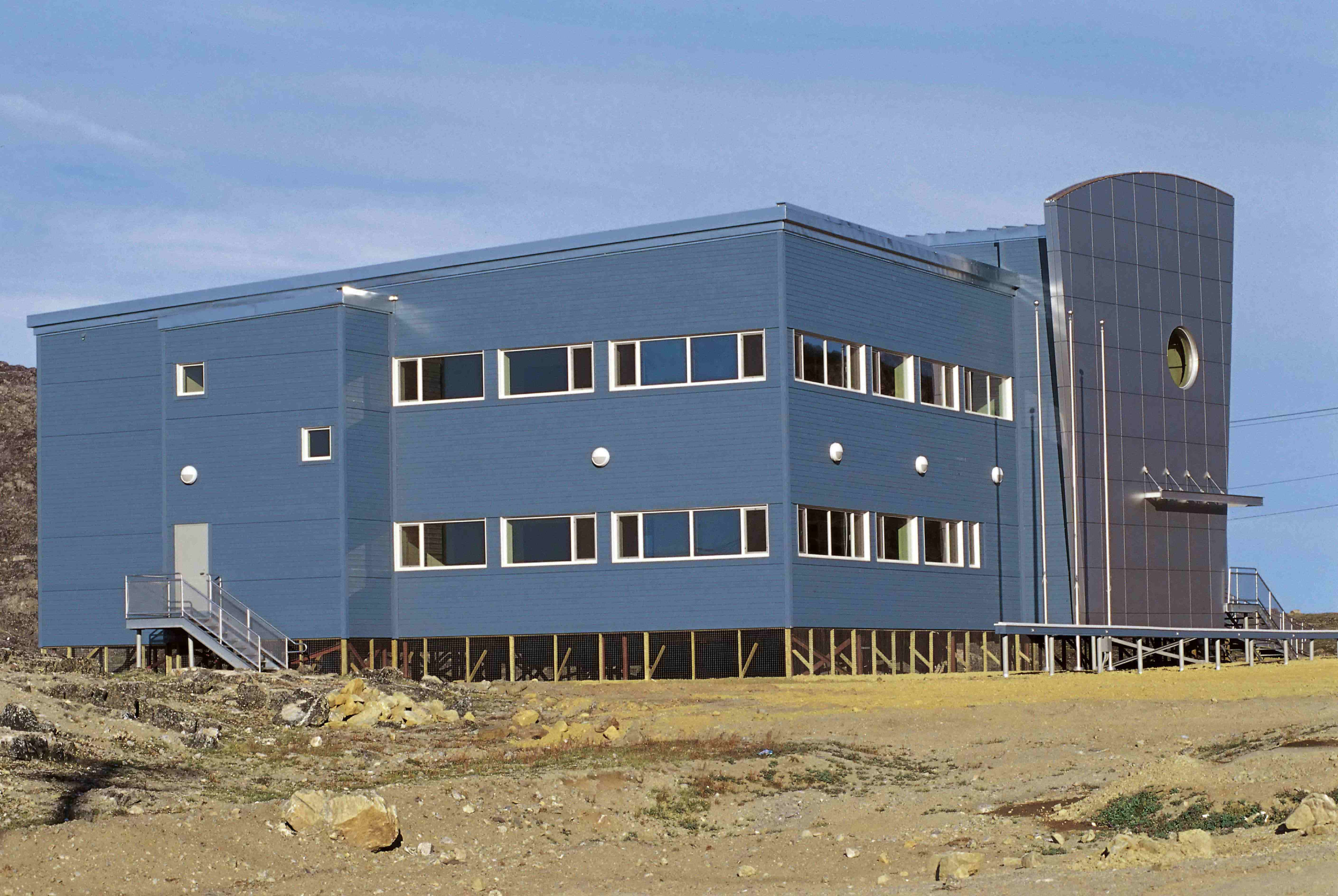
Government building in Cape Dorset (Kinngait)

With all efforts to preserve and cultivate cultural values of the past, the Inuit also want the progress of the modern industrial society. They show concern about the endangering of the environment by technical processes associated with the exploitation of resources, but are also interested in a future of western standards. They have also recognized that they are much better able to influence their conditions of living to their own ideas, when they agree within regional bounds on the goals to be pursued.

The Canadian Inuit, just like the other indigenous peoples (First Nations and Métis people) of Canada, grew the demand for collective ethnic rights and a territory of their own, with a government composed of their kind, and Inuktitut as one of the official languages. On the federal level, the Inuit got the right to vote in 1962. The first Inuk to be elected Member of Parliament was Peter Ittinuar in 1979. In 1976, the organization Inuit Tapirisat ("Inuit Brotherhood"), now the Inuit Tapiriit Kanatami ("Inuit United with Canada"), for the first time demanded the creation of a separate territory in the northeast of Canada. After more than 15 years of negotiation between Inuit and the Federal and Territorial Governments, finally an agreement was reached, the Nunavut Land Claims Agreement, which determined that from April 1, 1999, the north of Canada should be composed of three territories: Yukon, Nunavut and the remaining Northwest Territories. Like the two other territories, Nunavut was placed under direct control of the Canadian federal government and received increasing administrative autonomy. The Inuit have substantial local rights of control. They participate in the execution of important administrative positions, including police, legal and social welfare offices. Inuktitut is official government language, besides English and French.

==== Added value in Nunavut ====
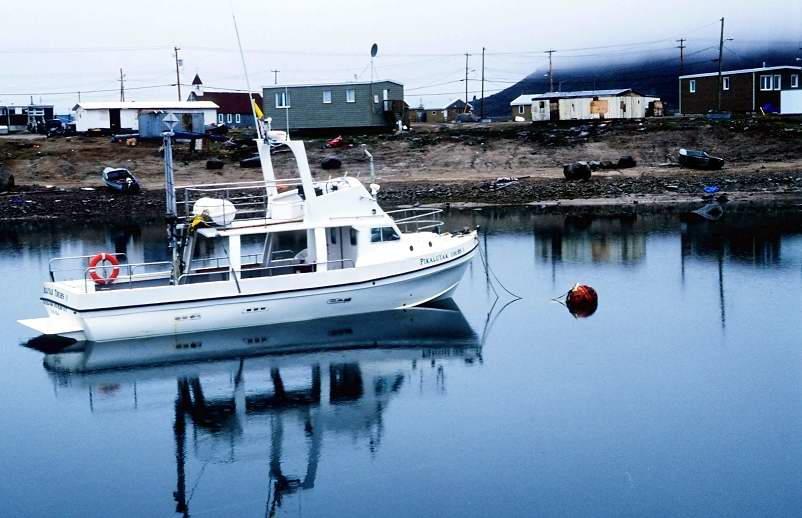
Modern Inuit yacht in a bay of Qikiqtarjuaq, available for tours to remote fjords and glaciers along the east coast of Baffin Island

The territorial government of Nunavut faces the challenge of economic development while balancing the Inuit's longstanding cultural traditions with the demands of contemporary life. Hunting, trapping and fishing remain central to Inuit subsistence and do not contribute enough added value to contribute to economic output. Trade in higher-value products derived from these activities, like seal furs, or ivory from narwhal or walrus, is subject to international trade regulations.

Revenue from Inuit arts or handicraft represents a notable contribution to the local economy, though it supports a relatively small number of livelihoods, particularly because of the large household sizes in many communities. This sector of economic activity by its nature can secure the future of only a limited proportion of the population.

Tourism faces structural constraints. It is difficult to secure sufficient consistent enrollment for group tours to the Arctic, and customized tours do not bring much money to the area. Cruise tourism has been identified as a comparatively more significant source of economic activity compared to other types of travel.

Reconciling traditional practices with the requirements of a modern, self-governing territory remains a central policy challenge for Nunavut's leadership. Whether the Nunavut model of self-determination will be successful depends on development of a sufficient number of trained Inuit professionals and administrators in the coming generations.

The deficit in education attainment and professional training remains substantial. Continued investment in education and leadership development is considered essential if Nunavut is to sustain its cultural identity while fulfilling the administrative and economic responsibilities of a self-governed territory within Canada.

==== Accord of Nunavik ====
An accord, the James Bay and Northern Quebec Agreement, between the Canadian federal government, the Province of Quebec and Inuit representatives resulted in the establishment of the Kativik Regional Government and gave a bigger political autonomy to the Nunavik region. As a result, all residents of the 14 Nunavik settlements elect their own representative in regional elections.

=== Settlement of land claims and titles ===
An important chapter of Canadian Arctic policy regarding development of the Inuit culture is reflected in the agreements settling Inuit land claims opposed to the Canadian state. The advancing exploitation of the Canadian Arctic and if its mineral resources led to ever more conflicts about land ownership and title between Inuit representatives and Federal Government. Land that is not under private ownership is considered as Federal land, but the Inuit claim large areas that they have inhabited and utilized for many centuries. The agreement reached in 1984 regarding land claims of the Inuvialuit (Inuit in the western Arctic) provided means to improve the situation of the indigenous residents of this region, by assuring 91,000 km^{2} (35,000 sq mi) of land to 2,500 Inuvialuit, as well as monetary compensation, funds for improving the social structure, hunting right, and more influence on dealing with the fauna, on natural and environmental protection.

The Nunavut Land Claims Agreement signed in 1993 with the Tunngavik Federation of Nunavut is the most comprehensive agreement ever reached in Canada. As a result, about 17,500 Inuit receive 350,000 km^{2} (140,000 sq mi) of land, monetary compensation, a share of the profits from exploiting the mineral resources, hunting rights and a larger voice in questions regarding land and environment.

Also in the north of the province of Quebec, land claims of Inuit groups were settled successfully. living in the interior and on the eastern coast of Labrador, a part of the province of Newfoundland and Labrador. Nunatsiavut, home to about 3,800 Inuit, is an Inuit self-government region in Labrador created on June 23, 2000. This Settlement area comprises the majority of Labrador's North Coast, while the land-use area also includes land farther to the interior and in Central Labrador. Nain is the administrative centre

=== Traditional Inuit culture ===
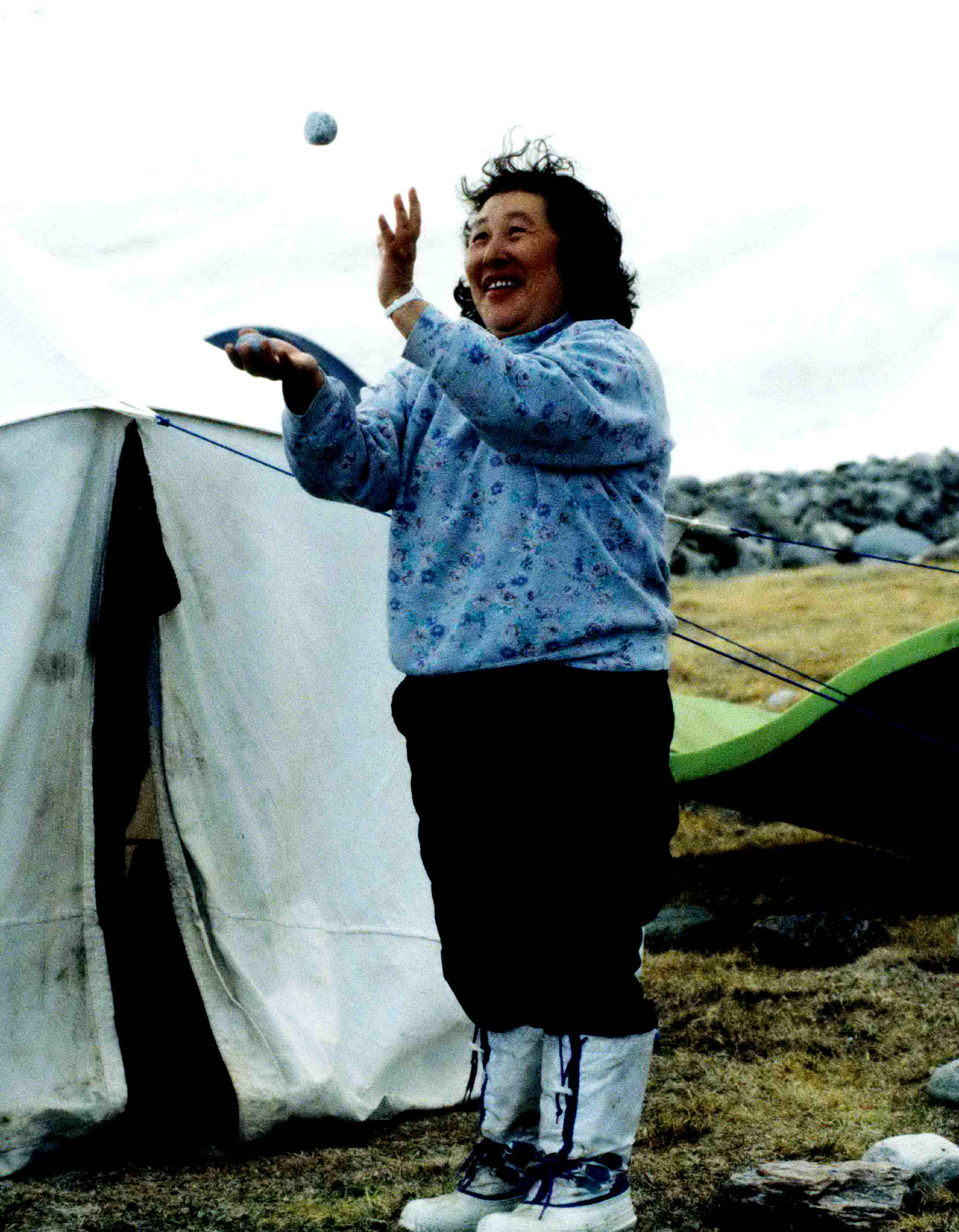
Traditional game with stones (1995)

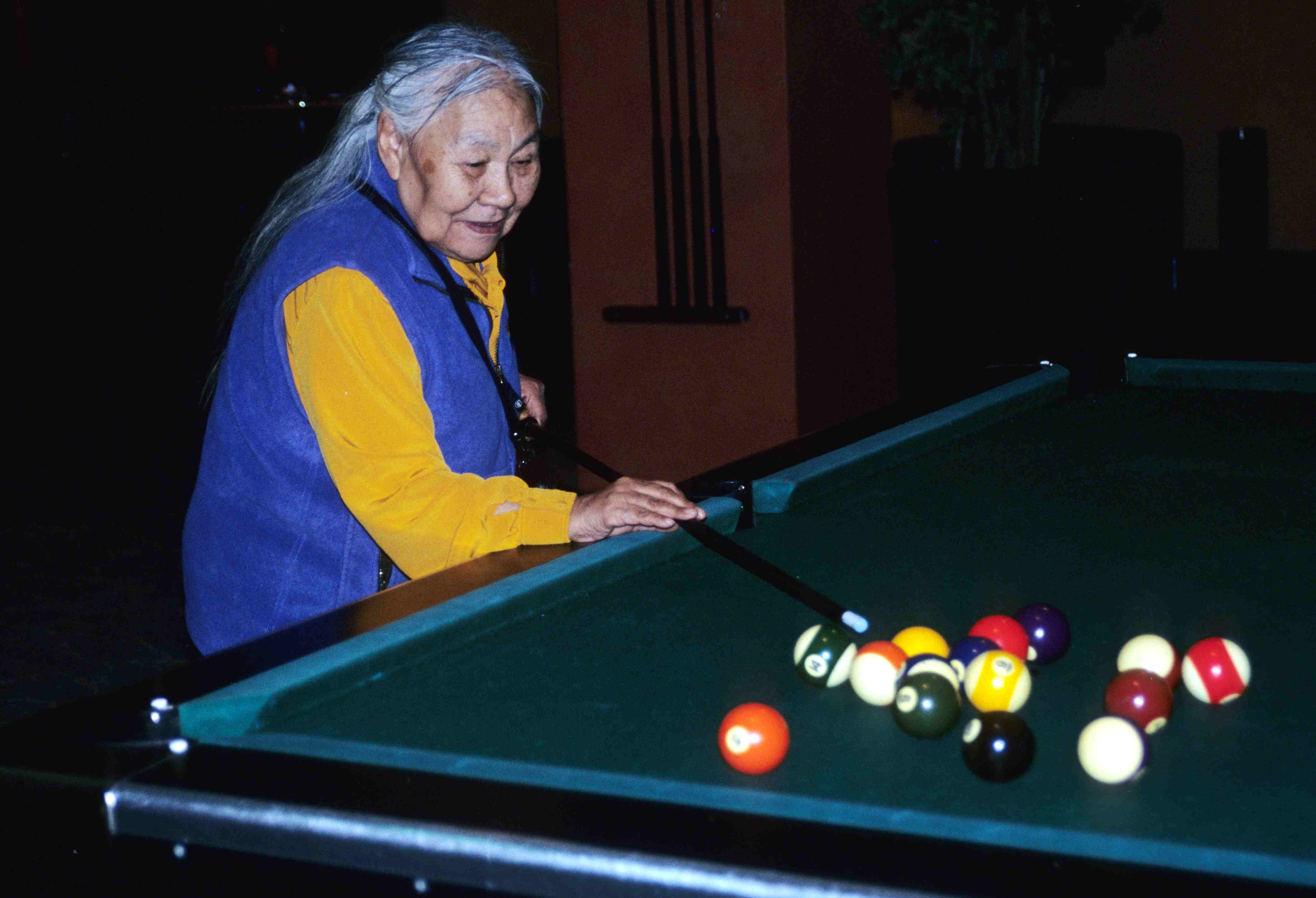
Inuk artist Kenojuak Ashevak playing pool billiards in a hotel in Berlin (2004)

The Inuit place a high value upon self-determination. The governments of Nunavut, the Northwest Territories and Nunatsiavut do not have political parties, but operate as consensus governments. Difficult questions are common in judicature, where traditional Inuit concepts are opposed to the legal system of the Canadian state.

==== Preservation of tradition and culture ====
In general, the government of Nunavut sees one of its most important tasks to be the preservation and care of Inuit tradition and culture. Currently, it puts great effort into recording and archiving the oral accounts of "elders" about the time before the move of the Inuit into the settlements. It is high time for this, because the number of elders with this knowledge are dwindling. The festival leading up to the new year is Quviasukvik, which also is their traditional new year and is held on Christmas.

==== Contemporary literature ====
A special part of the centuries-old cultural heritage of the Inuit are their myths and legends, which had been passed exclusively by word of mouth, because the Inuit had no written language and consequently had no literary tradition. In the Inuit culture story telling had the function that in other cultures literature has. The oral recital of passed-on knowledge gave the Inuit families particularly a feeling of immediate togetherness. At the same time, narrating made a connection between past and present, because the essential statements had been passed from generation to generation and accepted as the truth, without reservations. Among the Inuit, there are even nowadays few authors in the strict sense: writers mainly produce reports, summaries and essays about traditional contexts, or their own experiences ("non-fiction"), in seldom cases poems (mostly anthems) or songs.

A few noted Inuit writers have written works that are classified as novels, including Mitiarjuk Nappaaluk's Sanaaq, Markoosie Patsauq's Harpoon of the Hunter and Tanya Tagaq's Split Tooth, although even these works often defy conventional Western notions of literary genre, typically blending both fictional and non-fictional elements.

Among the best-known Inuit authors are the former Commissioner of Nunavut (the highest governmental representative of the territory), Peter Irniq (born 1947 on the Lyon Inlet, Kivalliq Region), the writer, poet, cartoonist and photographer Alootook Ipellie (born 1951 in a camp near Iqaluit, died 2007 in Ottawa), Michael Kusugak the children's author, and the former president of the Makivik Corporation and active author Zebedee Nungak (born 1951 in the south of Puvirnituq, Quebec).

==== Contemporary music ====
The Inuit did not have a very distinct tradition of music. There were "Aya-Yait", songs used for passing experiences from generation to generation, and so called because of their refrain "aya-ya". In a musical sense, they were simply-structured compositions. The traditional "throat singing" as well as the ritual drum dance by no means claim to be artistic compositions, but they were used for entertainment and for mythological-religious customs. The Inuit first heard European melodies by listening to the whalers. With those, they saw European instruments for the first time, the fiddle and the accordion, both of which have remained popular among the Inuit to this day. They also learned the square dance from the whalers. For the past twenty years, a kind of pop music is catching on in the Arctic, which the Inuit adopted from the south and then modified their own way. Today Susan Aglukark (born in 1967 in Churchill, Manitoba, and grew up in Arviat) is perhaps one the most popular Inuit singers. Other singers include Tagaq, Charlie Panigoniak and Lucie Idlout.

==== Contemporary fine arts ====
Contemporary Inuit art and handicrafts did not come about before the late 1950s as important resources for added value. soapstone sculptures, artistic drawings, hangings and tapestries (the latter mainly in Arviat, Baker Lake and Pangnirtung), attire, ceramics and dolls are providing a basic livelihood to a large number of Inuit artists of all ages today, just like hunting and fishing.

== Movies ==
- The Way of the Eskimo (Columbia Eneutseak), 1911
- Nanook of the North (Robert J. Flaherty), 1922
- Eskimo (Peter Freuchen, W. S. "Woody" Van Dyke II), 1932–33
- Trial at Fortitude Bay (Victor Sarin), 1994
- Kikkik (Martin Kreelak, Ole Gjerstad, Elisapee Karetak), 2000
- Atanarjuat – The Fast Runner (Zacharias Kunuk), 2001
- Minik (Axel Engstfeld), 2006
- The Necessities of Life (Benoît Pilon), 2000
- White Dawn

== Bibliography ==
- Barry Lopez: Arctic Dreams. Random House, Vintage, Bantam, Simon & Schuster 1986. ISBN 978-0553263961 (National Book Award for Nonfiction)
- Bryan & Cherry Alexander: Eskimo – Jäger des hohen Nordens. Belser, Stuttgart 1993. ISBN 3-7630-2210-4
- Kai Birket-Smith: Die Eskimos. Orell Füssli, Zürich 1948.
- Fred Bruemmer: Mein Leben mit den Inuit. Frederking & Thaler, München 1995. ISBN 3-89405-350-X
- Ernest Burch Jr., Werner Forman: The Eskimos. University of Oklahoma Press, Norman 1988, Macdonald/Orbis, London 1988. ISBN 0-8061-2126-2
- Brian M. Fagan: Das frühe Nordamerika – Archäologie eines Kontinents. C. H. Beck, München 1993. ISBN 3-406-37245-7
- Kenn Harper, Kevin Spacey: Give Me My Father's Body. The Life of Minik, the New York Eskimo. Steerforth Press, South RoyaltonVT 2000. ISBN 1-883642-53-1
- Kenn Harper: Minik – Der Eskimo von New York. Edition Temmen, Bremen 1999. ISBN 3-86108-743-X (deutsche Ausgabe)
- Richard Harrington: The Inuit – Life as it was. Hurtig, Edmonton 1981. ISBN 0-88830-205-3
- Gerhard Hoffmann (Hrsg.): Im Schatten der Sonne – Zeitgenössische Kunst der Indianer & Eskimos in Kanada. Edition Cantz, Stuttgart 1988. ISBN 3-89322-014-3
- Betty Kobayashi Issenman: Sinews of Survival – The Living Legacy of Inuit Clothing. UCB Press, Vancouver 1997. ISBN 0-7748-0596-X
- Robert McGhee: Ancient People of the Arctic. UBC Press, Vancouver 1996. ISBN 0-7748-0553-6
- David Morrison, Georges-Hébert Germain: Eskimo – Geschichte, Kultur und Leben in der Arktis. Frederking & Thaler, München 1996. ISBN 3-89405-360-7
- Maria Tippett, Charles Gimpel: Between Two Cultures – A Photographer Among the Inuit. Viking, Toronto 1994. ISBN 0-670-85243-0
- Ansgar Walk: Im Land der Inuit – Arktisches Tagebuch. Pendragon, Bielefeld 2002. ISBN 3-934872-21-2
- Ansgar Walk: Kenojuak – Lebensgeschichte einer bedeutenden Inuit-Künstlerin. Pendragon, Bielefeld 2003! ISBN 3-934872-51-4
- Sturtevant, William C. (1978). Handbook of North American Indians. Washington : Smithsonian Institution : 1978-2001. ISBN 0-16-004580-0.

== See also ==
- Circumpolar peoples
- Disc number – used by the Government of Canada in lieu of surnames
- Eskimo
- Head pull – Inuit game
- Higher education in Nunavut
- Lists of Inuit
- Siberian shamanism, Inuit religion, and Alaska Native religion
- Two-spirit
