= Jeannie Ugyuk =

Canadian politician

MLA for Nattilik
- In office 2010–2013
- Preceded by: Enuk Pauloosie
- Succeeded by: riding dissolved

MLA for Netsilik
- In office 2013–2015
- Preceded by: new district
- Succeeded by: Emilino Qirngnuq

Personal details
- Born: Spence Bay, Northwest Territories (now Taloyoak, Nunavut)
- Party: non-partisan consensus government

Jeannie Ugyuk is a Canadian Inuk politician, who was elected as the Member of the Legislative Assembly for the electoral district of Nattilik in the Legislative Assembly of Nunavut in the 2010 by-election. At that time the riding of Nattilik encompassed the communities of Gjoa Haven and Taloyoak, Nunavut. She became the second woman, along with Premier Eva Aariak, to sit in the 3rd Nunavut Legislature.

In the 2013 general election Ugyuk ran, unopposed, in the newly created riding of Netsilik, which consists of Taloyoak and Kugaaruk. She was chosen as the Family Services Minister in the 4th Nunavut Legislature. On November 7, 2015, a leadership review of the cabinet was held and as a result of a non-confidence vote a motion was made to remove Ugyuk from cabinet. On November 9, prior to discussion on the motion, Ugyuk resigned both from cabinet and as MLA and the motion was withdrawn. A by-election was held within six months.

== Before politics ==
Ugyuk was born in Taloyoak and has always lived there. She is a graduate of Nunavut Arctic College and was employed as a social worker. She has also taught at the Netsilik School in Inuktitut. She has also served on the hamlet council, the board of the woman's shelter and on the Anglican vestry and worked as a social worker.

Ugyuk is married with three children.
