= Tunnillie =

Tunnillie is a surname. Notable people with the surname include:

- Ikayukta Tunnillie (1911–1980), Inuk artist
- Ovilu Tunnillie (1949–2014), Inuk sculptor
- Toonoo Tunnillie (1920–1969), Inuk artist
