= Ukkusiksalik National Park =

National park in Nunavut, Canada

- Parc national Ukkusiksalik
- IUCN category II (national park)
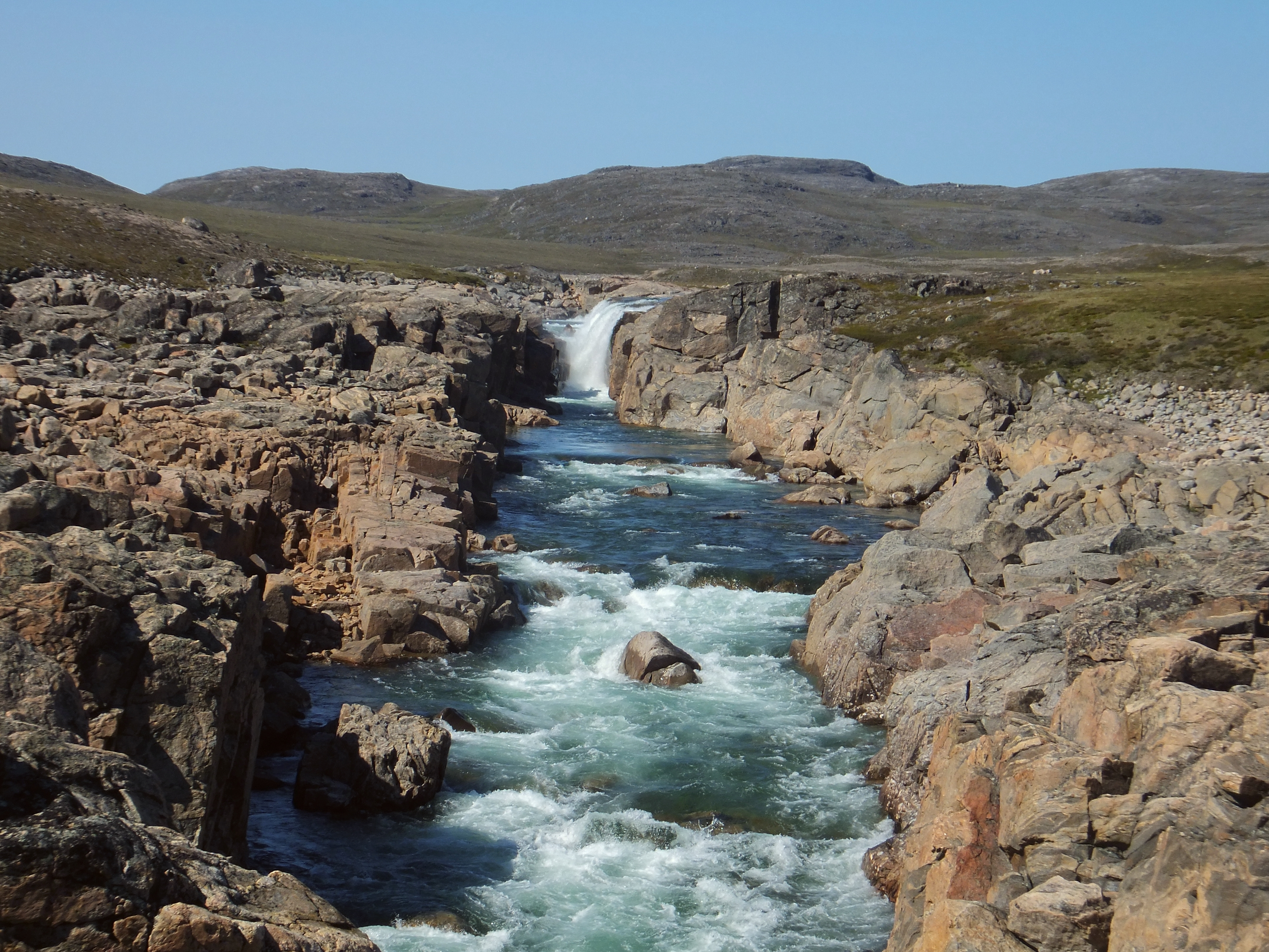
- Upper falls on Sila River

- Location within Canada Location within Nunavut
- Interactive map of Ukkusiksalik National Park
- Location: Nunavut, Canada
- Nearest city: Chesterfield Inlet
- Coordinates: 65°20′30″N 87°18′20″W
- Area: 20,885 km^{2} (8,064 sq mi)
- Established: August 23, 2003
- Governing body: Parks Canada

Ukkusiksalik National Park (/uːkuːˈsɪksəlɪk/) is a national park in Nunavut, Canada. It covers 20,885 km^{2} (8,064 sq mi) of tundra and coastal mudflats south of the Arctic Circle and the hamlet of Naujaat (formerly Repulse Bay), from Hudson Bay's Roes Welcome Sound towards the western Barrenlands and the source of Brown River. The park surrounds Wager Bay, a 100 km (62 mi)-long inlet on the Hudson Bay. Although the smallest of Nunavut's four national parks, it is the sixth largest in Canada. Its name relates to steatite found there: Ukkusiksalik means "where there is material for the stone pot" (from ukkusik, meaning pot or saucepan like qulliq).

In addition to a reversing waterfall and over 500 archeological sites, including an old Hudson's Bay Company (HBC) trading post, the region is home to such species as polar bears, brown bears, grey wolves, caribou, seals and peregrine falcons. Vegetation in the park is typical low tundra, with dwarf birch, willow and mountain avens. Scattered patches of boreal forest can be encountered in river valleys.

The park is uninhabited now, but the Inuit lived there from the 11th century to the 1960s. Remains of fox traps, tent rings, and food caches have been discovered in the area. The Hudson's Bay Company had an operating trading post in the area from 1925 to 1947.

The park was created on August 23, 2003, becoming Canada's 41st national park, and the fourth in Nunavut. It can be reached from the nearest communities of Baker Lake or Naujaat by plane or boat.

== History ==
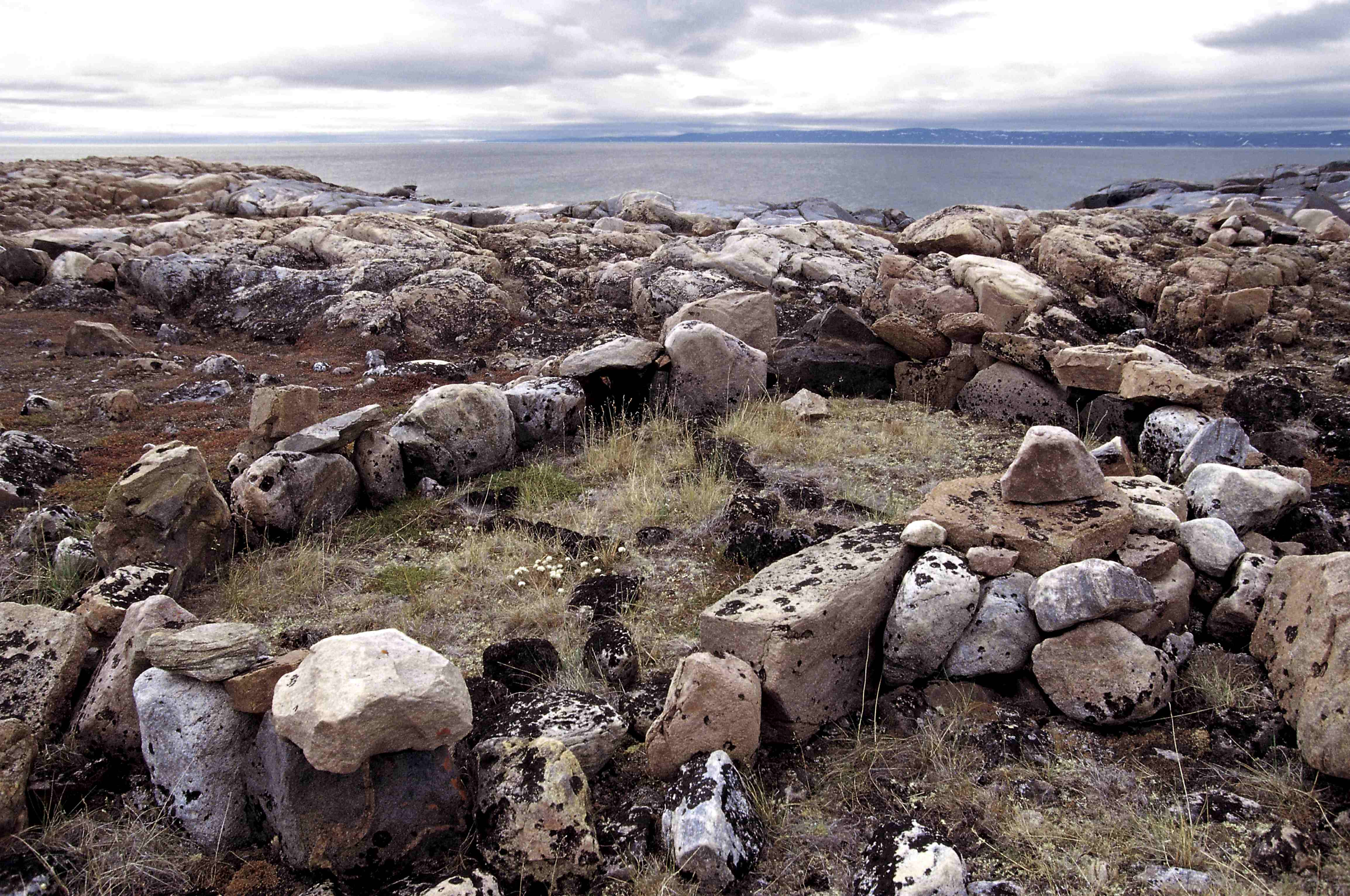
Qarmaq relics, Tinittuktuq Flats (Wager Bay)

Little is written about Wager Bay's early history, as until the 19th century the area was inhabited by Inuit who traditionally passed down their history by word-of-mouth.

There is, however, a remarkable quantity of stone relics, mainly tent rings from Thule people, inuksuit, caches, and shelters which provide evidence that the coast of Wager Bay has been inhabited for thousands of years. About 500 archaeological sites have been identified in recent years as well from Dorset culture (500 BC - 1000 AD), as from Thule culture (1000 - 1800 AD) and the last two centuries.

Barrenland Inuit (or Caribou Inuit) were not a homogeneous tribe, but families of quite diverse groups:

- Ukkusiksalingmiut from Back River and Hayes River regions
- Aivilingmiut from the Naujaat region
- Qairnirmiut from Baker Lake and Chesterfield Inlet regions
- Netsilik Inuit (Natsilingmiut) from around Kugaaruk and Taloyoak

=== First Europeans ===
In 1742, Christopher Middleton on his sailing ship Furnace was the first European to enter the fjord, which he could not leave for several weeks because of ice flow.

He named the bay after Sir Charles Wager, First Lord of the British Admiralty, and an inlet where he anchored Douglas Harbour after James and Henry Douglas, sponsors of his expedition. The Savage Islands nearby he named after "savage Eskimos" he met there.

Middleton was not successful in his search for the Northwest Passage, and neither was William Moore with his sloop Discovery five years later. As the region was too remote and thought to be useless, the bay was not again recorded or visited by Europeans for more than a century. In the 1860s, American explorer Charles Francis Hall's two-masted ship Monticello reached Roes Welcome Sound in 1864 while searching for John Franklin's lost Northwest Passage expedition of 1845 and had to overwinter at the mouth of Wager Bay.

In 1879, another American expedition led by Lieutenant Frederick Schwatka searching for John Franklin passed nearby Wager Bay by land. The region eventually became recognized when the fur trade started there at the end of the 19th century.

=== Early 20th century ===
At the beginning of the 20th century, the Canadian government showed an interest in the Wager Bay region and sent geologist Albert Peter Low on Neptune in order to establish Canada's sovereignty over the Arctic north.

At nearly the same time, in 1900, the American whaler George G. Cleveland, working alone, established a whaling station near the entrance of the bay, that operated for the next four years. Despite his closure of the station, Scottish whalers for some time tried their luck to hunt marine mammals in the Wager area. Large iron harpoon heads and other remnants are still found on the Savage Islands.

In 1910, the Royal North-West Mounted Police (RNWMP, precursor of the Royal Canadian Mounted Police) set up a police post at Wager Bay coast, near the Savage Islands. A police boat wreck in a small inlet on the southeast shore of Wager Bay is testimony to the brief presence of police there.

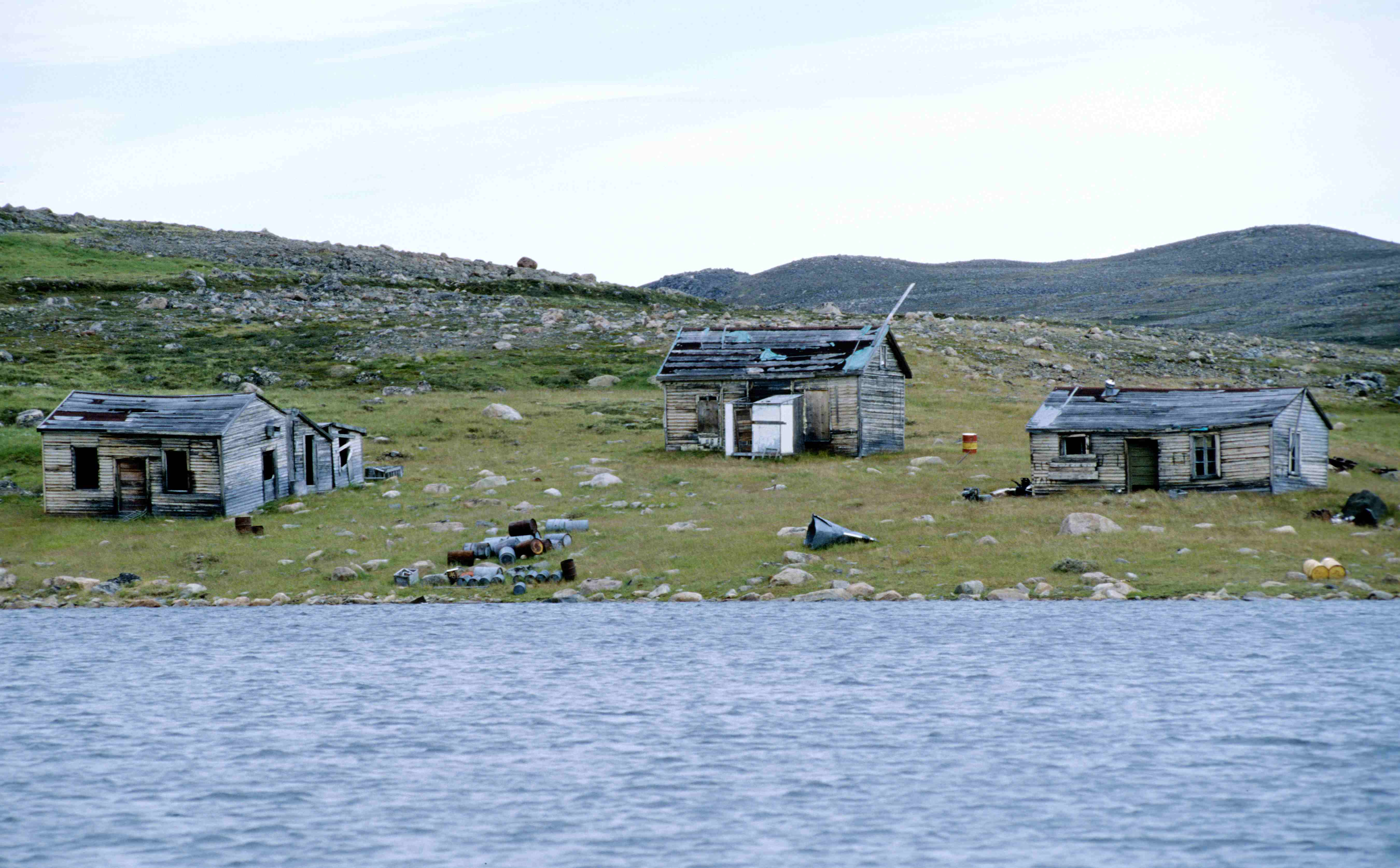
Abandoned Hudson's Bay Company outpost, Ford Lake

In 1915, George Cleveland set up a temporary—and the region's first—trading post, near the mouth of Wager Bay. In 1919, Cleveland, now working for the HBC, again set up a trading post in the mouth of Wager Bay. It was transferring building materials for the establishment of the Repulse Bay HBC post. Situated at a favorable location at the northern end of Roes Welcome Sound, this post became important for the company's intention to expand their business towards the north.

Alongside these local activities, the Hudson's Bay Company, during the first years of the 20th century, made a great effort to get the fur trade under control. They started to build up a large and dense network of posts from the barren lands of northwest Hudson Bay to the northern coast of the continent. According to those plans, a post at the outermost edge of Wager Bay should play a key role. That new post was meant to include the Ukkusiksalingmiut area to the Back River estuary, 250 km (160 mi) to the northwest, into the company's strategy, thereby, if ever possible, preventing commercial activities of competitors, Revillon Frères, operating from their Baker Lake base. In the late summer of 1925, the two-masted schooner Fort Chesterfield entered the channel, and, following the advice of local Inuit, found a well-protected inlet in Tusjujak (now Ford Lake, named after J. L. Ford, post manager in 1929) to establish their strategic station.

During the first years, things went quite well. Besides offering usual supply goods, the post supported the Inuit in general, and gave, as far as possible, medical assistance. Thus, it became a meeting point that allowed Inuit from distant camps to exchange news as well. In December 1929, twenty-two Inuit families were counted, 107 persons in total, camping in their igloos nearby. Soon later, fur trade stopped booming. Hudson's Bay Company changed their major post into an outpost in 1933 and entrusted an Inuk, Iqungajuq (Wager-Dick), with its management. He thereby got the chance to start his own business in the fur trade. Wager-Dick and his family lived in the post buildings and ran the outpost until 1946. The company was eventually successful with its strategy towards its competitor and bought Revillon Frères in 1936.

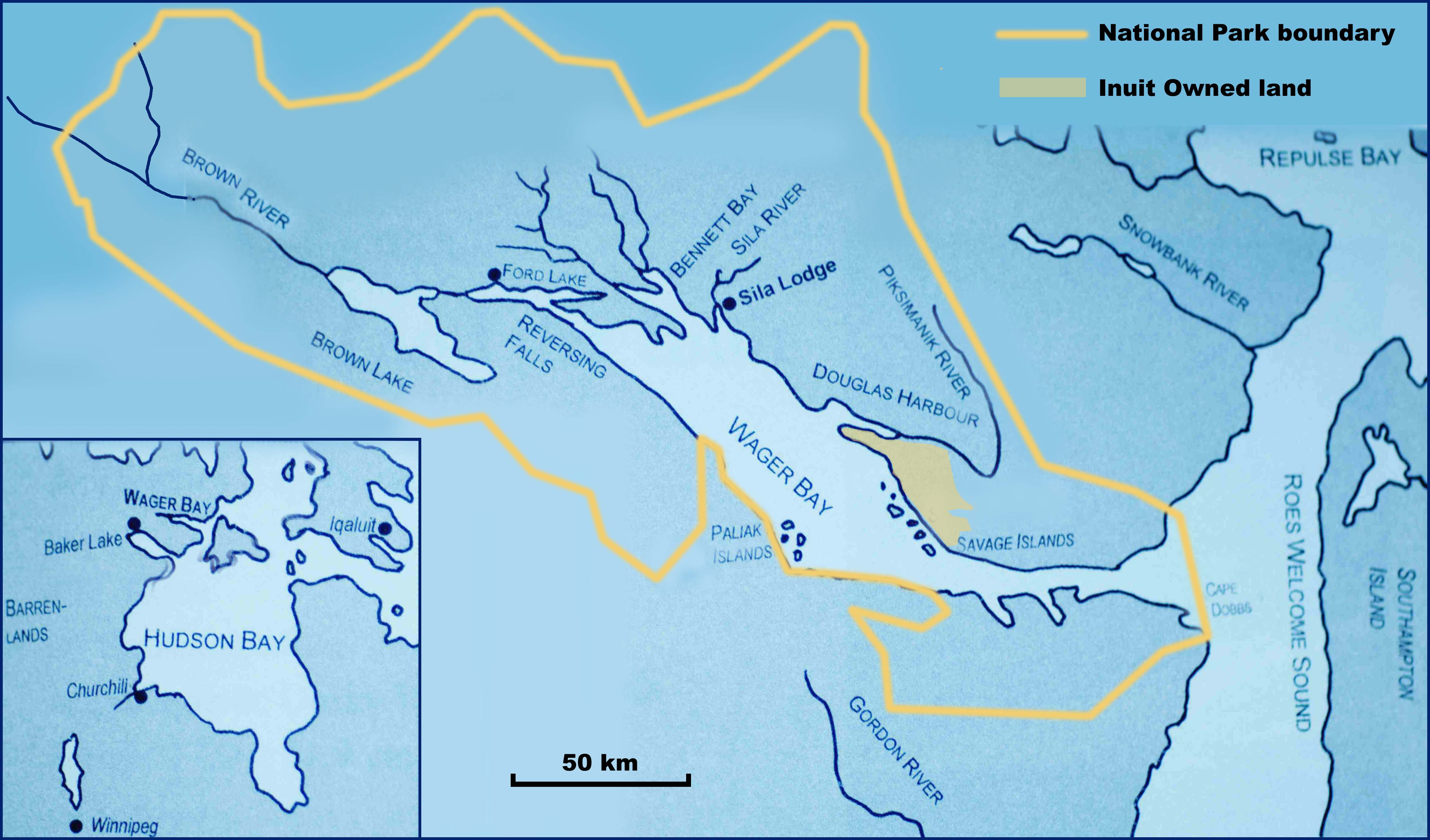
Ukkusiksalik National Park

Catholic missionaries, Missionary Oblates of Mary Immaculate, who passed by in those years set up a small mission on one of Savage Islands, but never had great success and withdrew, when the activities of Hudson's Bay Company ended by mid-1940s and the Inuit had migrated into communities.

Some 30 years later, from 1979 to 1981, Inuit from Rankin Inlet tried to revive their former homeland, but without success. The area is presently unoccupied by people, except for occasional visitors and local Inuit who hunt in the area.

Declared a national park on August 23, 2003, Ukkusiksalik became Canada's 41st national park.

== Landscape ==
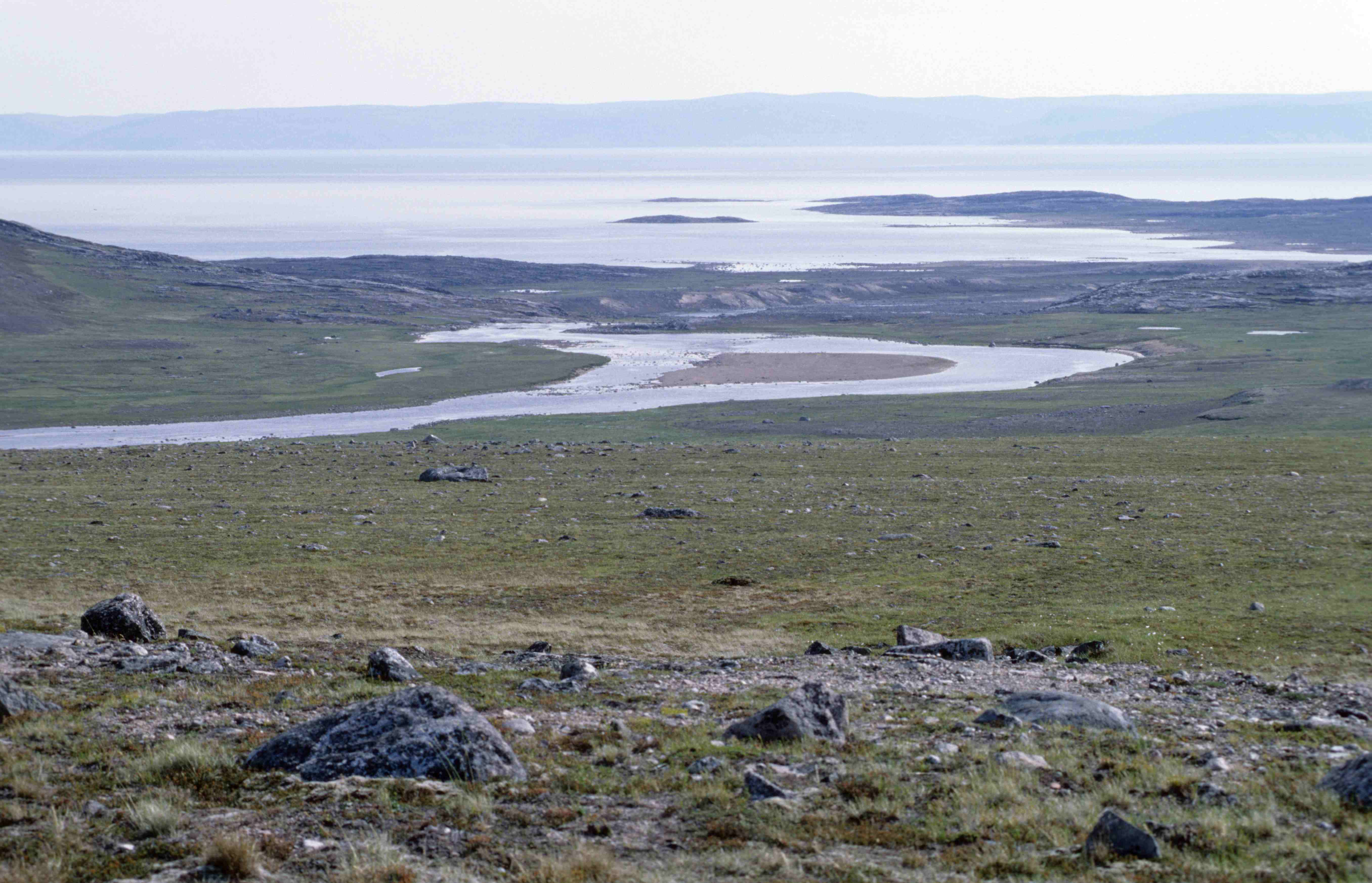
Sila River and Wager Bay

At Hudson Bay's northwest corner, some 200 km (120 mi) northeast of Chesterfield Inlet, near the Capes Fullerton and Kendall, is the entrance of Roes Welcome Sound, which extends northwards between the Barrenlands of the Kivalliq Region (meaning: border of the land) and Southampton Island to Repulse Bay, where there is a settlement of that name, situated at the Arctic circle. Wager Bay is an inlet of Roes Welcome Sound, pretty much in its geographical center, near Cape Dobbs.

Wager Bay is the core of the national park. Its entrance is a rather narrow bottleneck, it is more than 30 km (19 mi) long and approximately 4 km (2.5 mi) wide at its narrowest spot. The tides rise and fall up to 8 metres (26 ft) and currents are extraordinary and cause large accumulations of ice masses during most of the year, often preventing the passage of watercraft. During early summer the rising flood water washes large quantities of drifting ice and icebergs into the bay. These accumulate during ebb tide, close the bottleneck like a cork and may stay for hours or even days.

In some places, Wager Bay is more than 250 m (820 ft) deep. The fjord is up to 35 km (22 mi) wide and almost 200 km (120 mi) long, extending northwest into Kivalliq-Barrenlands. It reaches latitude 66°, therefore some 40 km (25 mi) from the Arctic Circle.

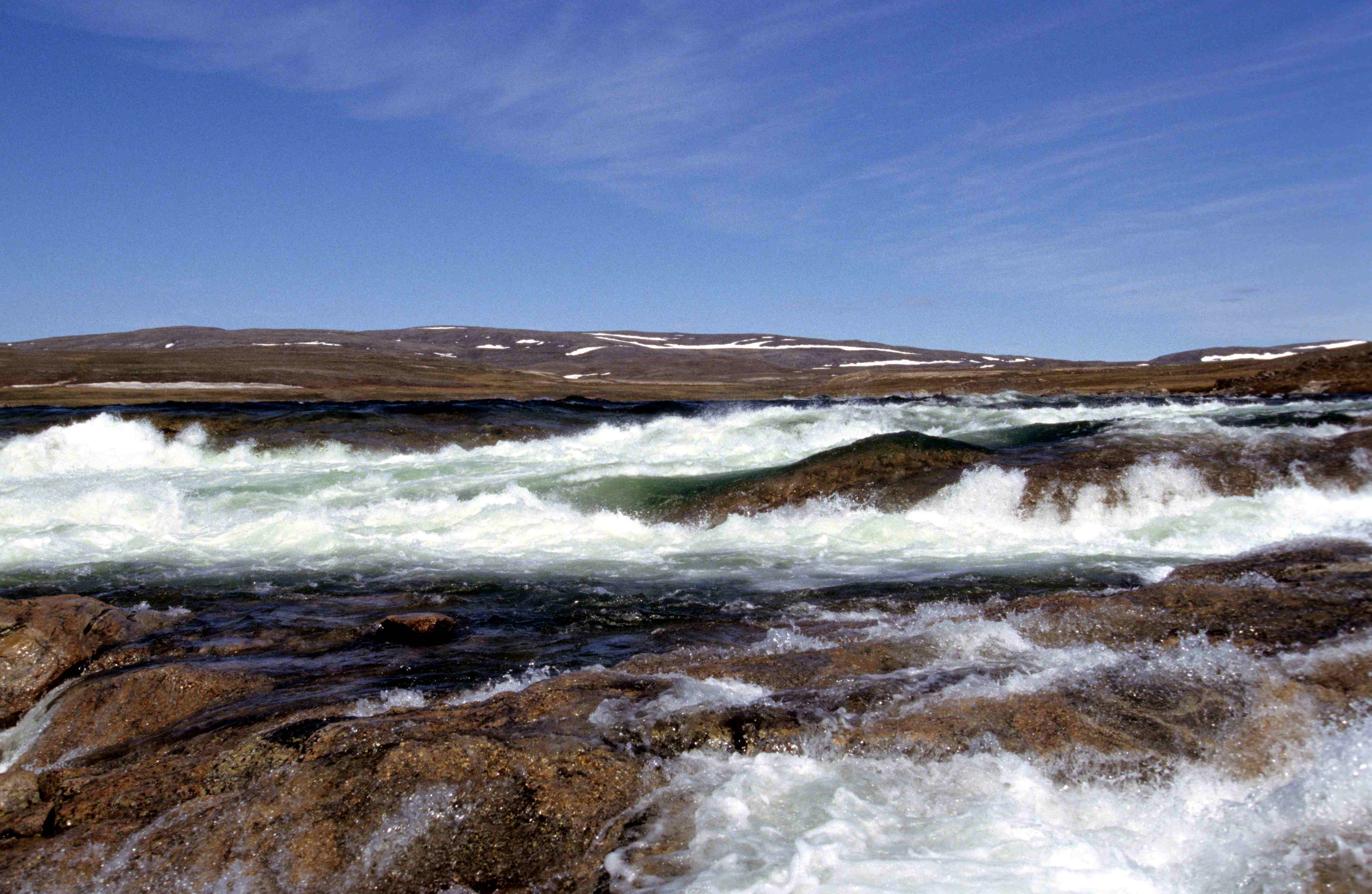
Sila River's "Second Waterfall"

Even at its western end, tides are impressive, between Wager Bay and the 2 km (1.2 mi) wide Ford Lake (Tusjujak in Inuktitut), so-called Reversing Falls occur. In Canada, only three of those phenomena are known, Reversing Falls in New Brunswick and Barrier Inlet, Hudson Strait, Nunavut are the others. The strongest ones are in Norway, 30 km (19 mi) east of Bodø, Nordland. They are called Saltstraumen and considered world's strongest tidal currents.

The soil of the area is characteristic of the Canadian Shield.

== Climate ==
The prevailing climate is arctic-maritime; relatively little precipitation, low temperatures, and strong winds. It has North America's highest wind chill and largest snowdrifts. Due to this, the National Park is considered to be "high arctic".

A remarkable feature is that at the south shore of Wager Bay a steep mountain range, gorged by former glaciers, strongly influences the weather. Due to its proximity to Hudson Bay, drops in temperature and strong fog are normal during summertime, as blizzards are during early autumn. The bay is not completely free of ice before the end of July, although temperatures may range from cool to very warm between May and September.

== Fauna ==
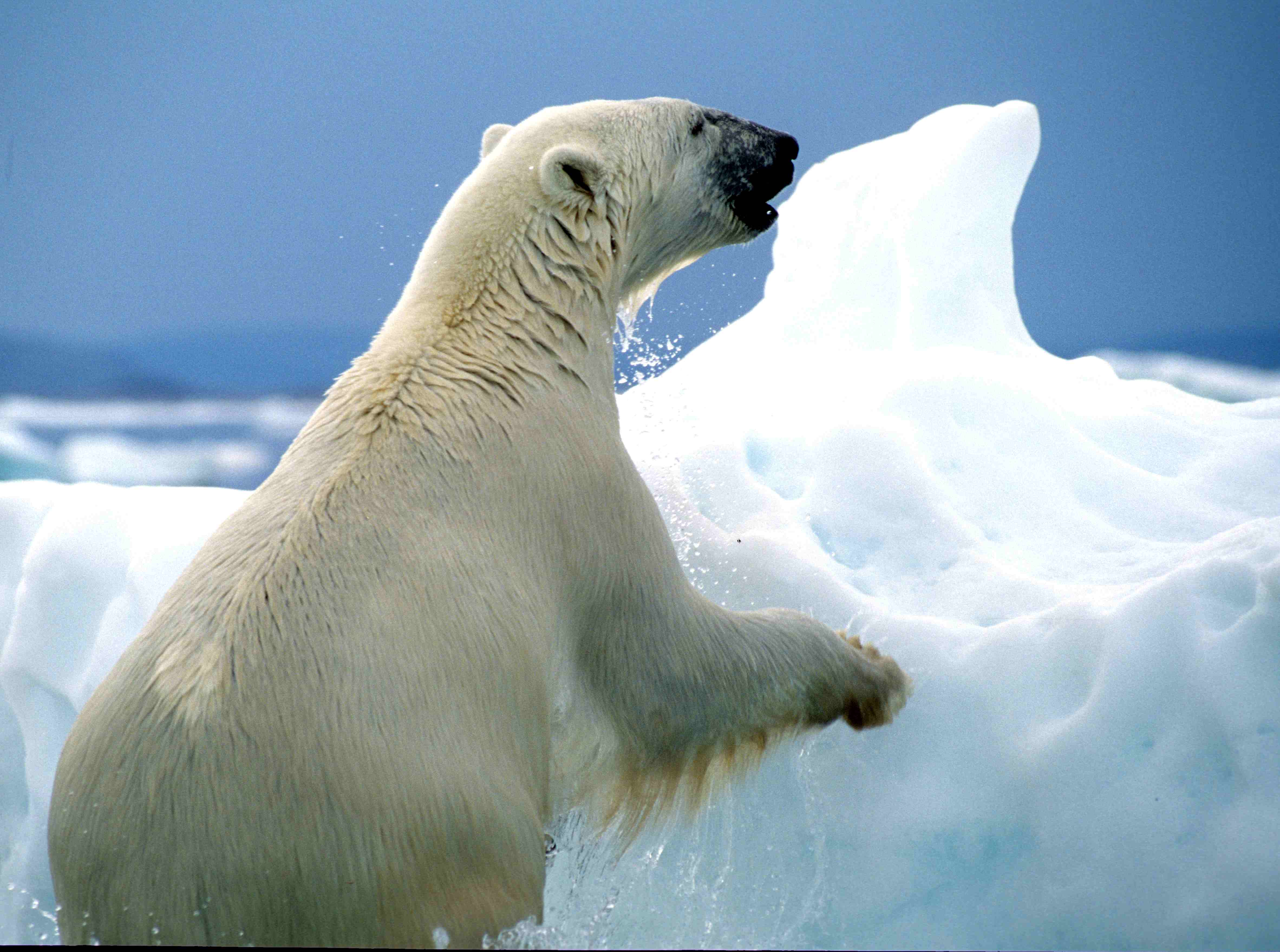
Male polar bear climbing ice floe

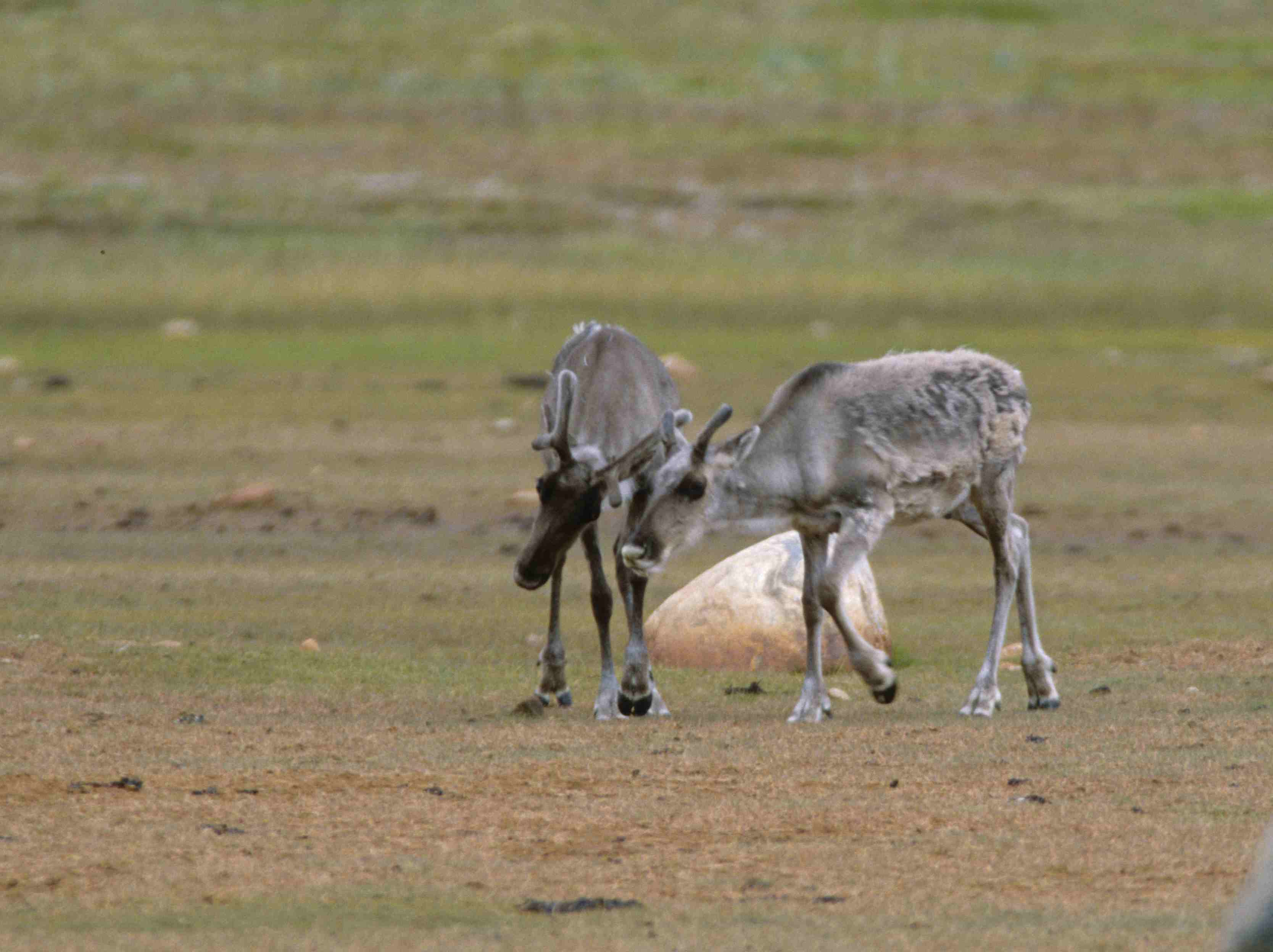
Two young caribou at Wager Bay during low tide

According to actual zoological research, there are sixteen species of mammals in the park. At Wager Bay's south shore is a large polar bear denning area. Therefore, in July and at the beginning of August, polar bears can be observed, from a boat, on floes, on islands or swimming from close up. barren-ground caribou (Rangifer tarandus groenlandicus) and curious Arctic ground squirrels (Spermophilus parryii) come close to Sila Lodge. More rarely seen are the shy lemmings (Lemmus trimucronatus). Due to their camouflage, Arctic foxes (Vulpes lagopus) and Arctic hares (Lepus arcticus), are not easily spotted but are most likely seen when fleeing. Other animals seen occasionally include Hudson Bay wolves (Canis lupus hudsonicus), muskoxen (Ovibos moschatus), snowshoe hares (Lepus americanus) and wolverines (Gulo gulo).

Several species of marine mammals can be seen in the park's area: ringed seals (Phoca hispida) and bearded seals (Erignathus barbatus) live there in large numbers, and from time to time a walrus (Odobenus rosmarus), common seal (harbour seal, Phoca vitulina), a beluga (Delphinapterus leucas), a narwhal (Monodon monoceros), or a bowhead whale (Balaena mysticetus) may appear in Wager Bay.

Only four species of fish have been reported: Arctic char (Salvelinus alpinus), lake trout (Salvelinus namaycush), lumpfish (Cyclopterus lumpus) and ninespine stickleback (Pungitius pungitius).

Birders are able to observe up to forty species, including:

- Birds of prey
  - Golden eagle (Aquila chrysaetos)
  - Gyrfalcon (Falco rusticolus, bird of the Northwest Territories)
  - Peregrine falcon (Falco peregrinus)
  - Rough-legged hawk (Buteo lagopus)
  - Snowy owl (Bubo scandiacus)
- Water and sea birds
  - Common eider (Somateria mollissima)
  - King eider (Somateria spectabilis)
  - Oldsquaw (Clangula hyemalis)
  - Northern pintail (Anas acuta)
  - Canada goose (Branta canadensis)
  - Snow goose (Chen caerulescens)
  - Brant goose (Branta bernicla)
  - Tundra swan (Cygnus columbianus)
  - Common loon (Gavia immer)
  - Yellow-billed loon (Gavia adamsii)
  - Pacific loon (Gavia pacifica)
  - Red-throated loon (Gavia stellata)
  - Glaucous gull (Larus hyperboreus)
  - Ivory gull (Pagophila eburnea)
  - Long-tailed jaeger (Stercorarius longicaudus)
  - Herring gull (Larus argentatus)
  - Thayer's gull (Larus thayeri)
  - Black guillemot (Cepphus grylle)
  - Arctic tern (Sterna paradisaea)
- Shore birds
  - Sanderling (Calidris alba)
  - Baird's sandpiper (Calidris bairdii)
  - Pectoral sandpiper (Calidris melanotos)
  - Semipalmated sandpiper (Calidris pusilla)
  - White-rumped sandpiper (Calidris fuscicollis)
  - Semipalmated plover (Charadrius semipalmatus)
  - American golden plover (Pluvialis dominica)
  - Sandhill crane (Grus canadensis)
- Song birds
  - Snow bunting (Plectrophenax nivalis)
  - Lapland longspur (Calcarius lapponicus)
  - Common raven (Corvus corax)
  - Rock ptarmigan (Lagopus muta, bird of Nunavut)
  - Horned lark (Eremophila alpestris)
  - Water pipit (Antus spinoletta)

Upland game birds

  - Willow ptarmigan (Lagopus lagopus)

== Flora ==
On the one hand, the national park is a typical rocky tundra area, on the other hand, beneath algae, bryophyte and lecanorales lichens grows a flora of 25 families of flowering plants. They are closely related to alpine flora, but different. The following families and species are found:

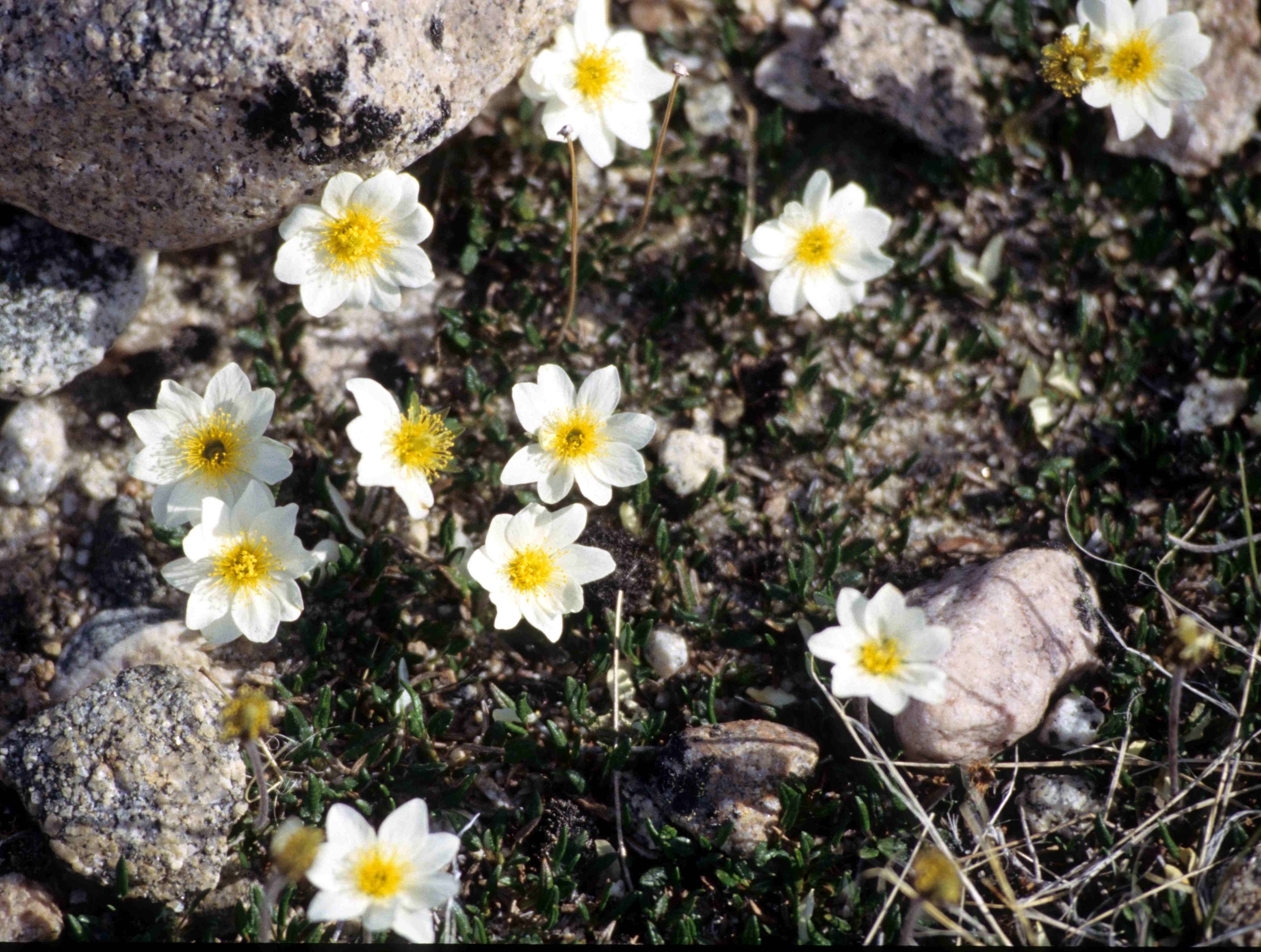
Mountain avens – territorial flower of the Northwest Territories

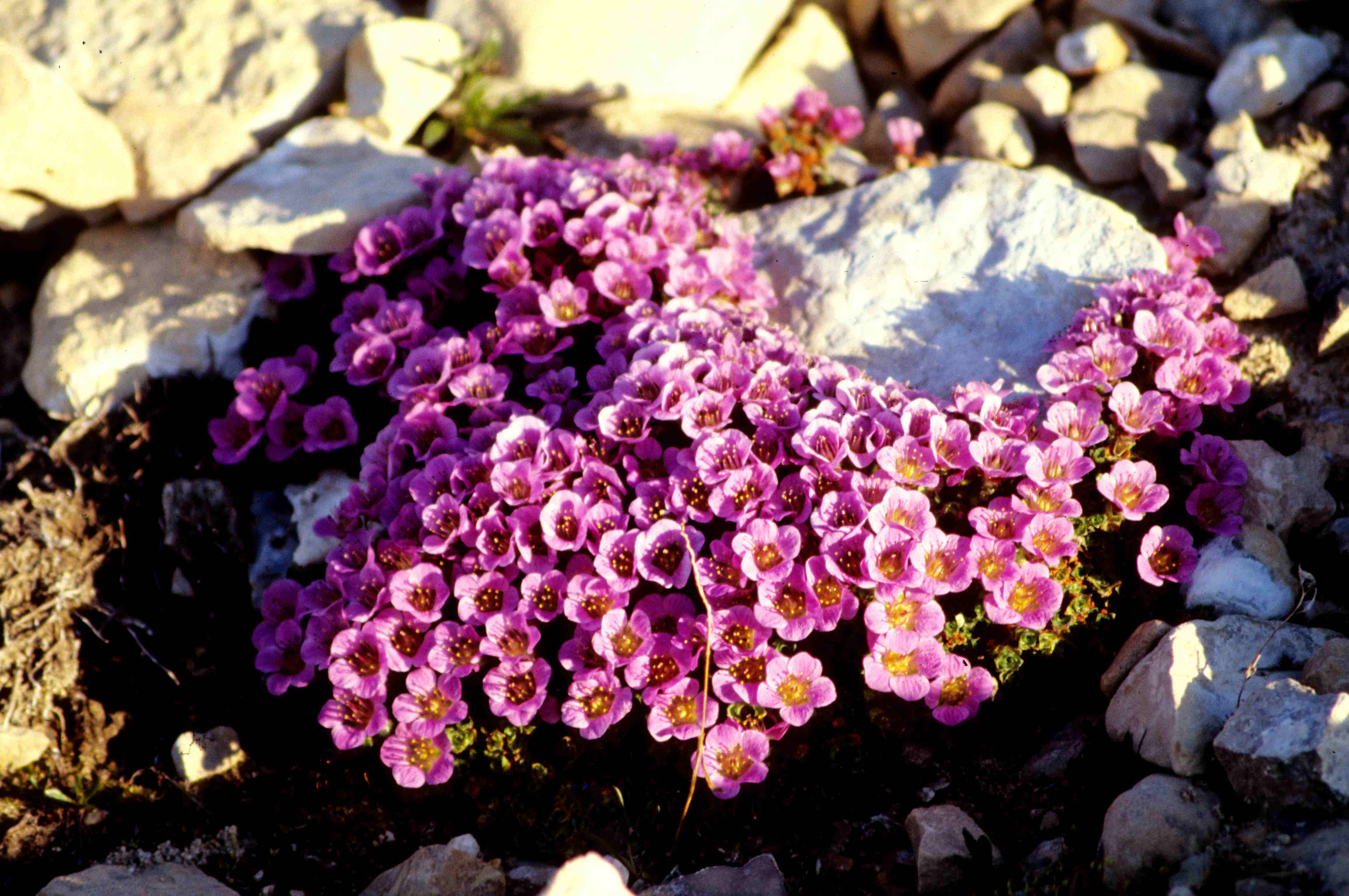
Purple saxifrage – territorial flower of Nunavut

- Birch family (Betulaceae) - dwarf birch (Betula nana), American dwarf birch (Betula glandulosa)
- Bladderwort family (Lentibulariaceae) - common butterwort (Pinguicula vulgaris)
- Bluebell family (Campanulaceae) – bluebell (Campanula uniflora)
- Borage family (Boraginaceae) - sea lungwort (Mertensia maritima)
- Buckwheat family (Polygonaceae) – alpine bistort (Polygonum viviparum), mountain sorrel (Oxyria digyna)
- Buttercup family (Ranunculaceae) - birdfoot buttercup (Ranunculus pedatifidus), pygmy buttercup (Ranunculus pygmaeus)
- Clubmosses (Lycopodiaceae) - mountain clubmoss (Huperzia selago)
- Daisy family (Asteraceae) - alpine daisy (Arnica alpina), Arctic daisy (Dendranthema arcticum), lacerate dandelion (Taraxacum lacerum), mastodon flower (Senecio congestus), pussy-toes (Antennaria ssp.), sea-shore chamomile (Matricaria ambigua), wormwood (Artemisia borealis)
- Diapensia family (Diapensiaceae) – diapensia (Diapensia lapponica)
- Ferns (Polypodiaceae) - fragrant shield fern (Dryopteris fragrans)
- Figwort family (Scrophulariaceae) - Arctic lousewort (Pedicularis arctica), hairy lousewort (Pedicularis hirsuta), Labrador lousewort (Pedicularis labradorica), Lapland lousewort (Pedicularis lapponica), Sudeten lousewort (Pedicularis sudetica)
- Grasses (Poaceae or Gramineae) - Alpine fescue (Festuca brachyphylla), bluegrass (Poa alpina), reed-bentgrass (Calamagrostis lapponica), sea lyme-grass (Leymus arenarius), spike trisetum (Trisetum spicatum), wild barley (Hordeum jubatum)

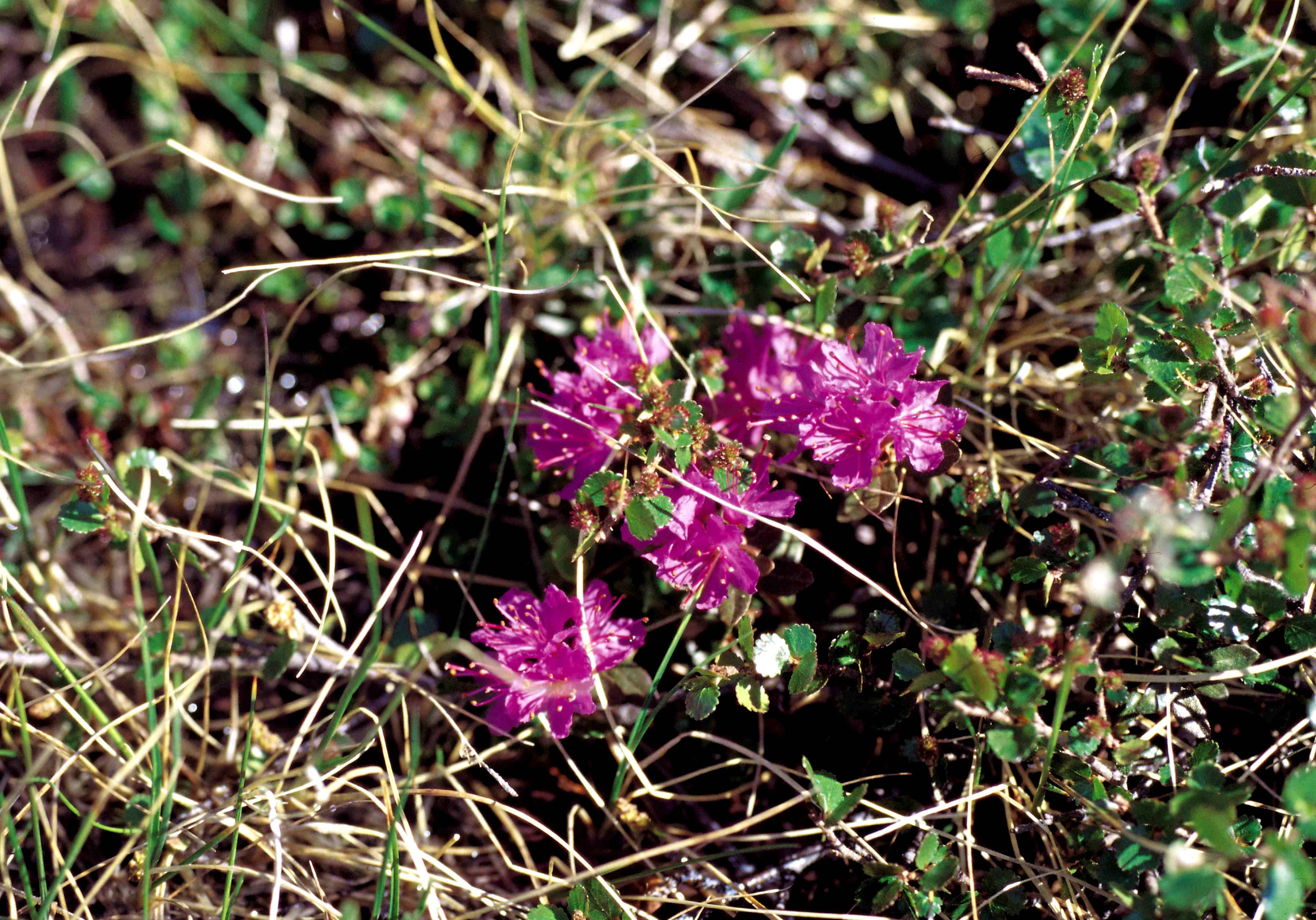
Lapland rose-bay, Ukkusiksalik National Park, July 1999

- Heath family (Ericaceae) - Arctic bell heather (Cassiope tetragonal), black bearberry (Arctostaphylos alpina), bog bilberry (Vaccinium uliginosum), Labrador tea (Rhododendron subarcticum), bog-rosemary (Andromeda polifolia), crowberry (Empetrum nigrum), Lapland rose-bay (Rhododendron lapponicum), large-flowered wintergreen (Pyrola grandiflora), mountain cranberry (Vaccinium vitis-idaea)
- Horsetail family (Equisetaceae) - horsetail (Equisetum arvense)
- Leadwort family (Plumbaginaceae) - thrift (Armeria maritime)
- Lily family (Melanthiaceae) - false bog asphodel (Tofieldia pusilla)
- Mustard family (Brassicaceae or Cruciferae) - Arctic bladderpod (Lesquerella arctica)
- Pea family (Fabaceae, Faboideae) - alpine milk vetch (Astragalus alpinus), Arctic oxytrope (Oxytropis arctica), blue oxytrope (Oxytropis arctobia), liquorice-root (Eskimo potato) (Hedysarum alpinum), sweet vetch (Hedysarum mackenziei), yellow oxytrope (Oxytropis maydelliana)
- Pink family (Caryophyllaceae) - Arctic bladder campion (Melandrium affine), knotted pearlwort (Sagina nodosa), moss campion (Silene acaulis), mouse-ear chickweed (Cerastium alpinum), purple bladder campion (Melandrium apetalum), seabeach sandwort (Honckenya peploides), star chickweed (Stellaria longipes)
- Poppy family (Papaveraceae) - Arctic poppy (Papaver radicatum)
- Rose family (Rosaceae) - cinquefoil (Potentilla) or silverweed (Potentilla anserina or Argentina anserina), cloudberry (Rubus chamaemorus), mountain avens (Dryas octopetala) (flower of the Northwest Territories), snow cinquefoil (Potentilla nivea)
- Saxifrage family (Saxifragaceae, saxifrage) - bulblet saxifrage (Saxifraga cernua), golden saxifrage (Chrysosplenium), grass of Parnassus (Parnassia), prickly saxifrage (Saxifraga tricuspidata), purple saxifrage (Saxifraga oppositifolia) (flower of Nunavut)
- Sedges (Cyperaceae) - Arctic cotton (Eriophorum scheuchzeri), cotton grass (Eriophorum vaginatum), sedge (Carex ssp.)
- Plantain family (Plantaginaceae (see Hippuris or Hippuridaceae)) - common mare's tail (Hippuris vulgaris)
- Willow family (Salicaceae, salix) - Arctic willow (Salix arctica), planeleaf willow (Salix planifolia), least willow (Salix herbacea), net-leaved willow (Salix reticulata), trailing willow (Salix arctophila)
- Willowherb family (Onagraceae) - fireweed (Epilobium angustifolium) (flower of Yukon)
- Wintergreen family (Pyrolaceae) -

== Tourism ==
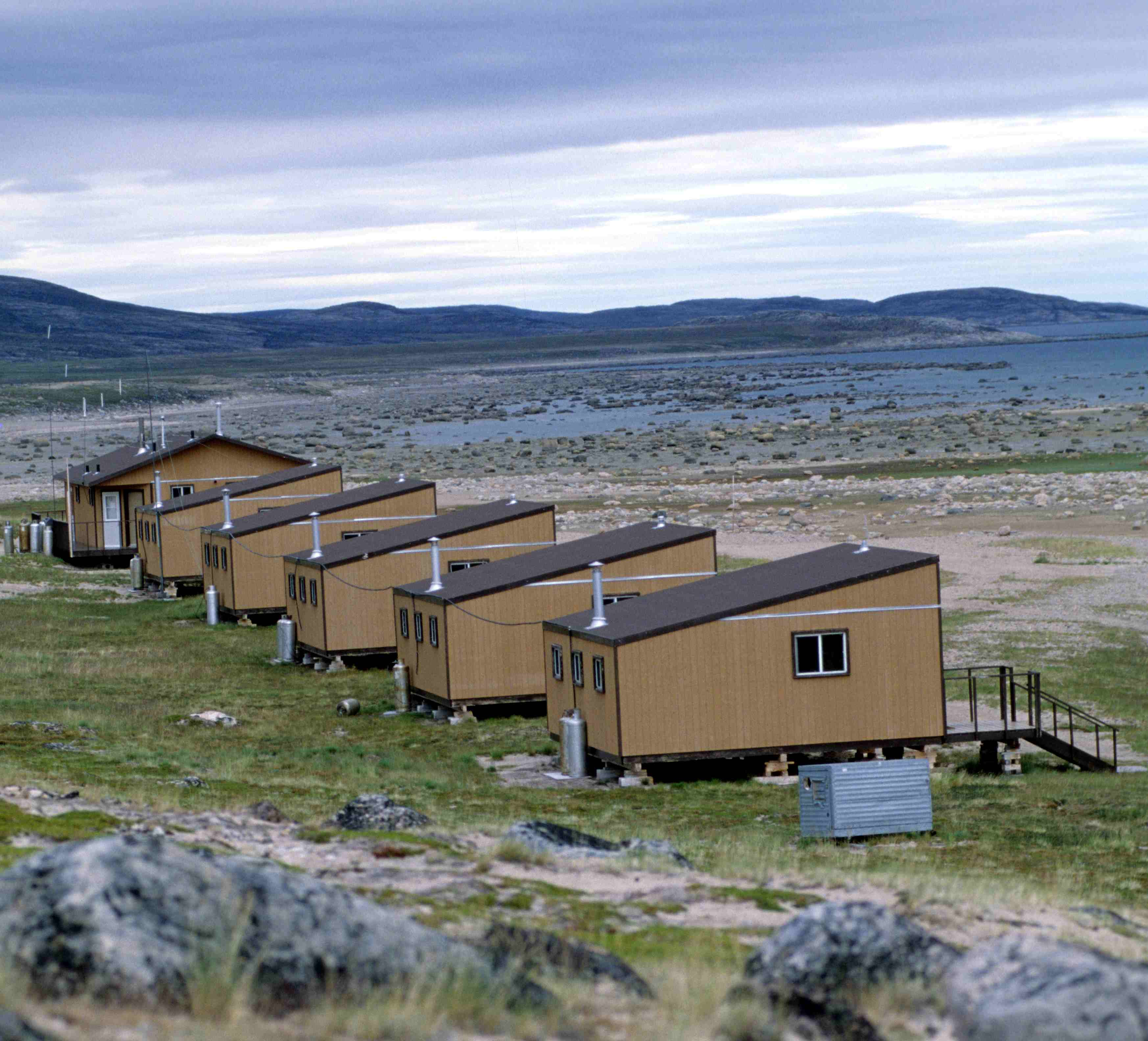
Sila Lodge, Wager Bay

Usually, the park can only be visited during a very few summer weeks, from the beginning of July until the beginning of August. Before that, Wager Bay has too much ice to be visited by boat, and in the autumn the Inuit say: "During summertime, you may watch polar bears. Afterwards, they will watch you!"

The place can be reached by a hired plane – usually one would depart from Baker Lake, about 350 km (220 mi) away, where scheduled flights arrive from Rankin Inlet. One can also approach by motorboat from Repulse Bay, where Parks Canada runs a station, but due to possible problems with ice this might take longer and therefore will only be considered by explorers or movie teams who have to bring a lot of equipment.

The only air strip in the park is at the Sila River on Wager Bay's north coast. In 1987, Inuit from the area built Sila Lodge at this location. The lodge was opened for a few weeks during the summertime to allow nature enthusiasts to stay in the area. Due to the high expenses of the flights, the lodge has been little used since 2002. From Sila Lodge, guided tours were offered, for instance boating tours to the Wager Bay islands, or to Ford Lake across the reversing falls, to the former Hudson's Bay Company outpost, or walks to the surrounding area, where one would find impressive relics of earlier settlements, such as tent rings, qarmaq and inuksuk. The site can be used as a starting point for backpacking trips, but with suitable precautions taken for polar bears in the area.

=== Trekking routes ===
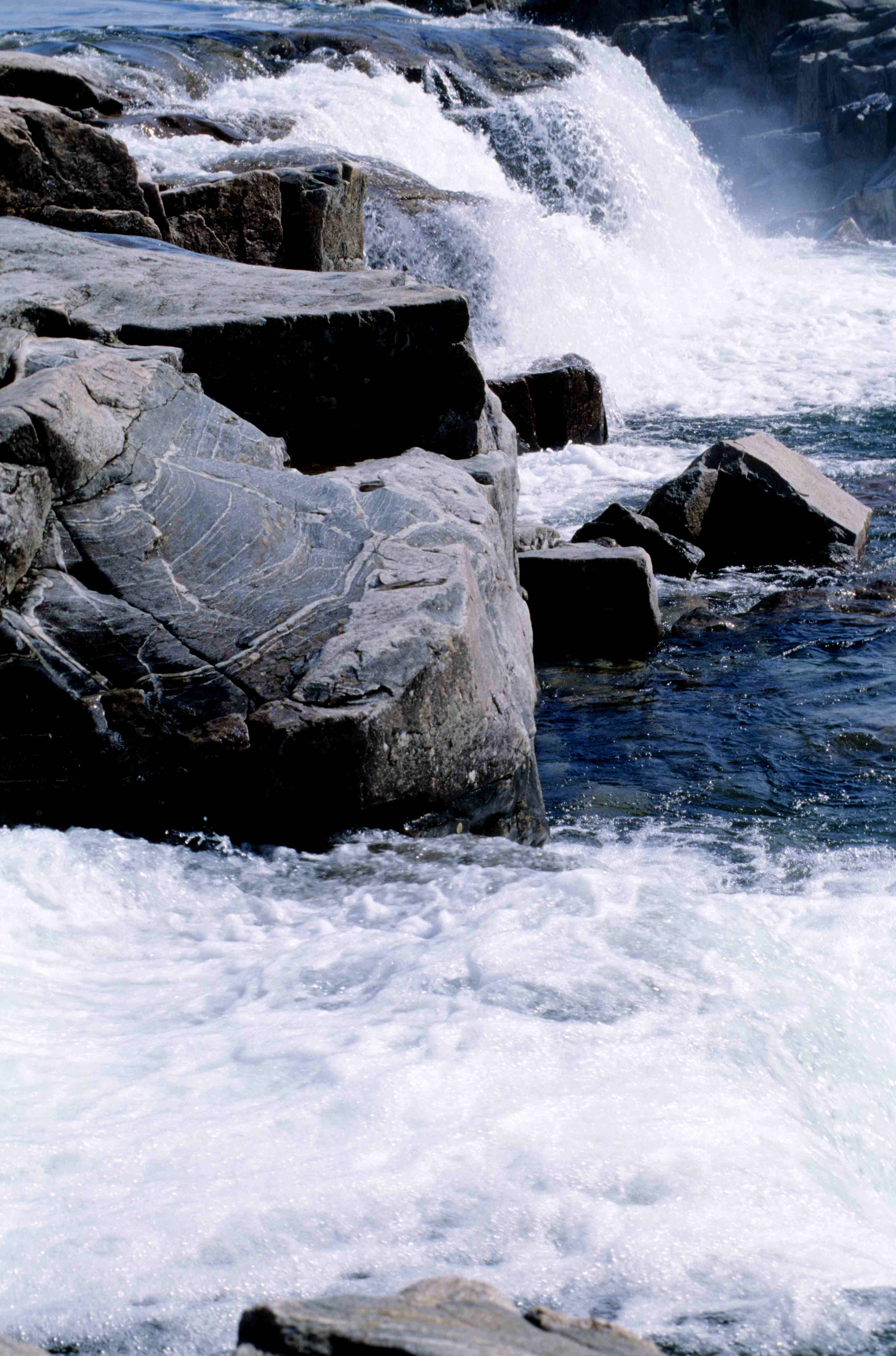
Sila River's "Fourth Waterfall" – typical Canadian Shield rocks

The following valleys, water falls and lakes can be reached by walking from the Sila Lodge area:

- First (lowest) waterfall of Sila River - total: 4 km (2.5 mi) | time to walk: 1 hr | total time: 1.5 hrs | height difference: 40 m (130 ft) | peak: 4 m (13 ft) | difficulty: easy
- Traversing Tinittuktuq Flats - total: 6 km (3.7 mi) | time to walk: 1.5 hrs | total time: 5 hrs | height difference: 80 m (260 ft) | peak: 30 m (98 ft) | difficulty: easy
- To Ship's Cove - total: 10 km (6.2 mi) | time to walk: 2.5 hrs | total time: 4 hrs | height difference: 50 m (160 ft) | peak: 30 m (98 ft) | difficulty: easy-medium
- Second waterfall of Sila River - total: 8 km (5.0 mi) | time to walk: 2.5 hrs | total time: 5 hrs | height difference: 160 m (520 ft) | peak: 110 m (360 ft) | difficulty: medium
- Third and fourth waterfall of Sila River and Falcon Gorge - total: 8 km (5.0 mi) | time to walk: 2.5 hrs | total time: 5 hrs | height difference: 416 m (1,365 ft) | peak: 110 m (360 ft) | difficulty: medium-difficult
- Fisherman's Hike - total: 10 km (6.2 mi) | time to walk: 3 hrs | total time: 5 hrs | height difference: 200 m (660 ft) | peak: 150 m (490 ft) | difficulty: medium-difficult
- To Butterfly Lake - total: 16 km (9.9 mi) | time to walk: 5 hrs | total time: 8 hrs | height difference: 400 m (1,300 ft) | peak: 250 m (820 ft) | difficulty: (very) difficult

== Photo gallery ==
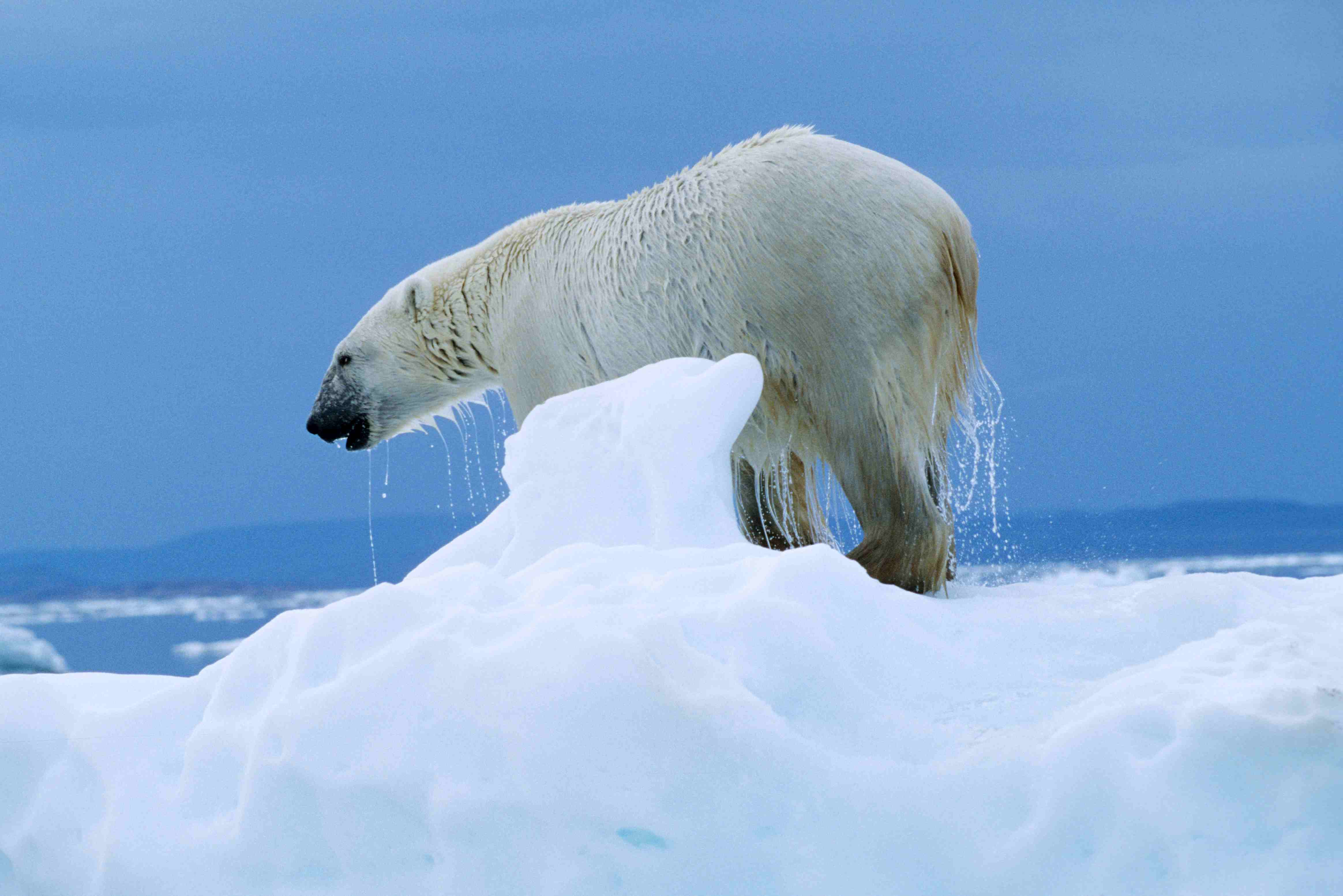
Polar bear (Ursus maritimus) stepping on ice flow

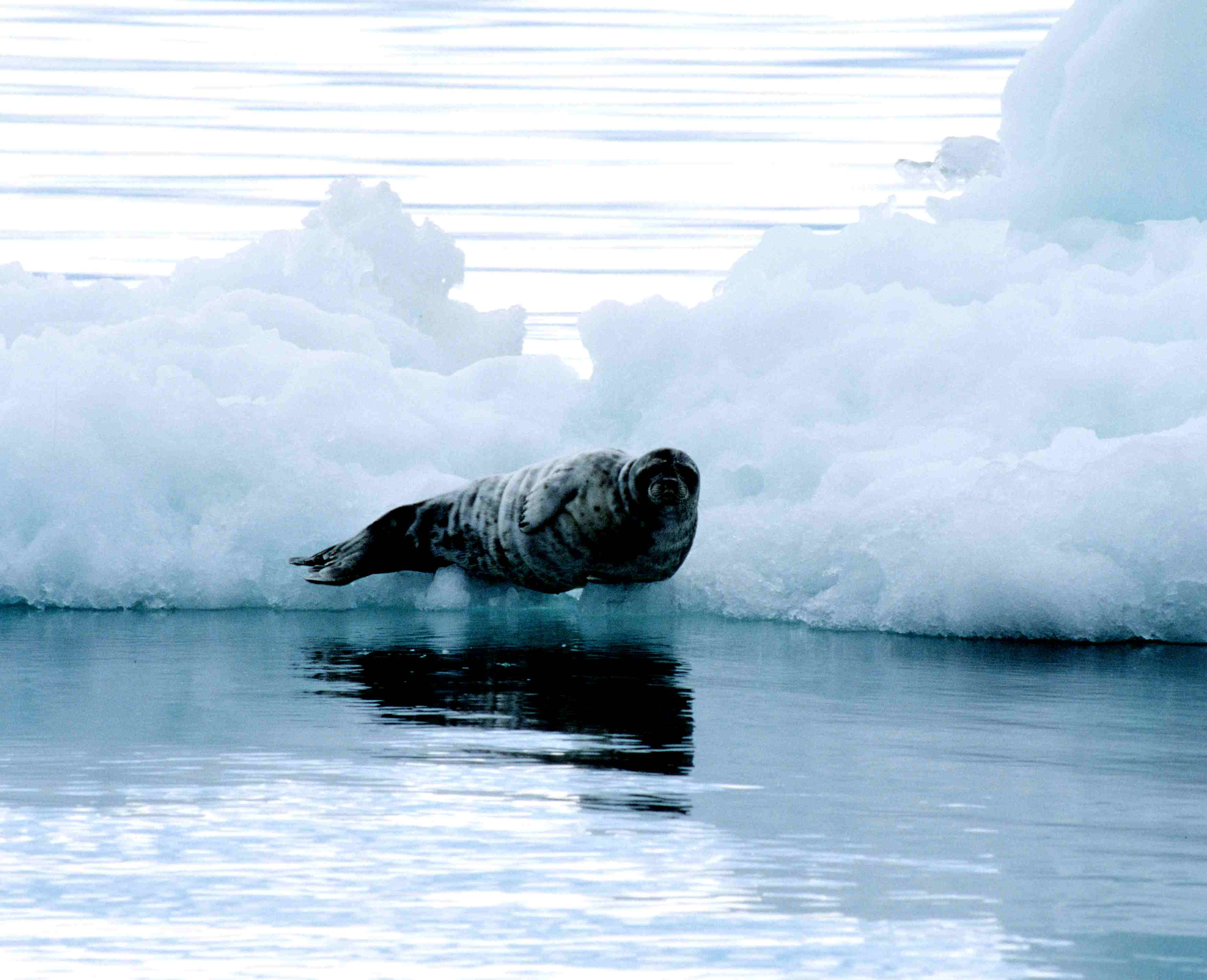
Bearded seal (Erignathus barbatus) on ice flow in Wager Bay

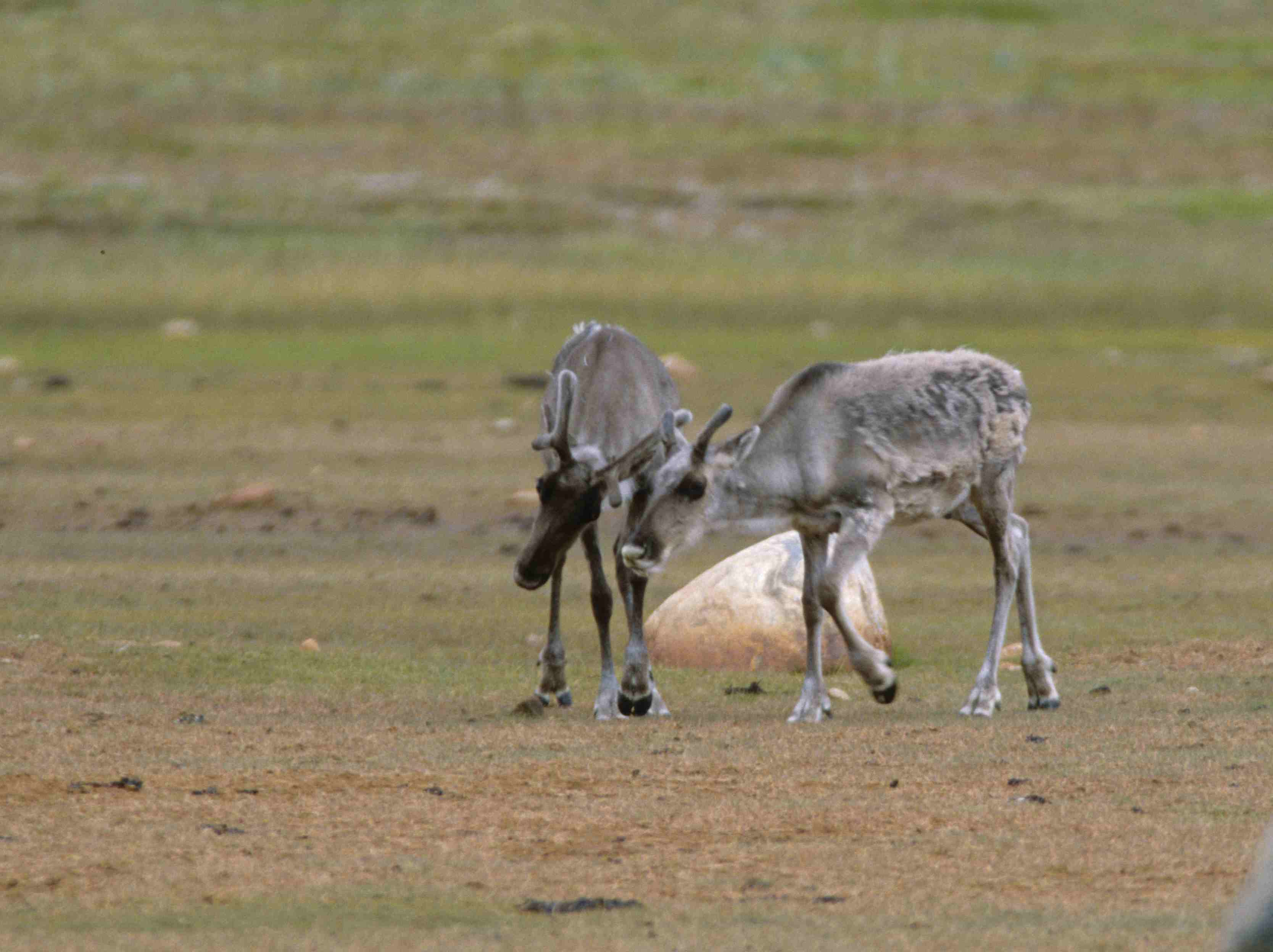
Two young Barrenland caribous (Rangifer tarandus groenlandicus) near Wager Bay

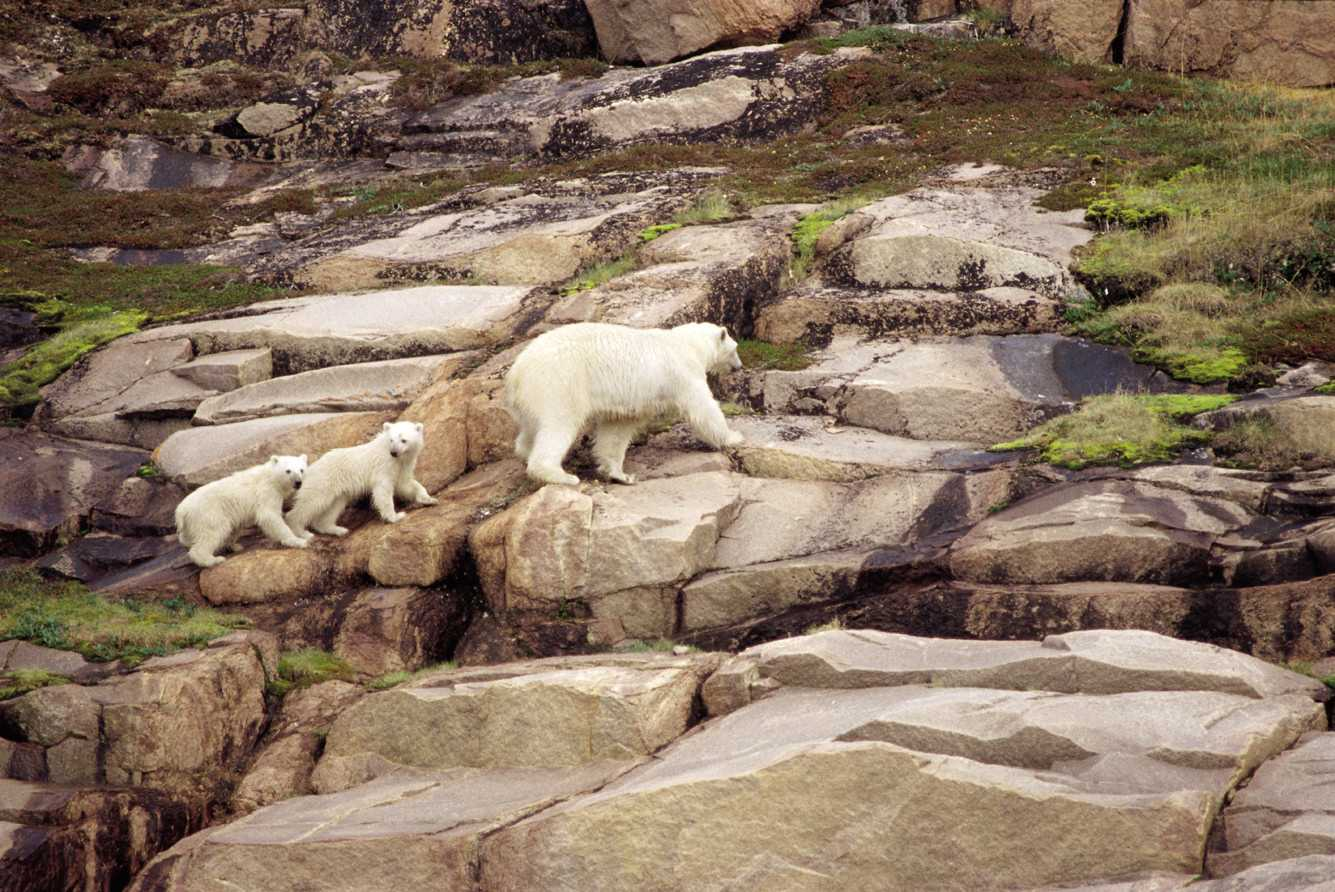
Polar bear mother and two cubs climbing up Guillemot Island

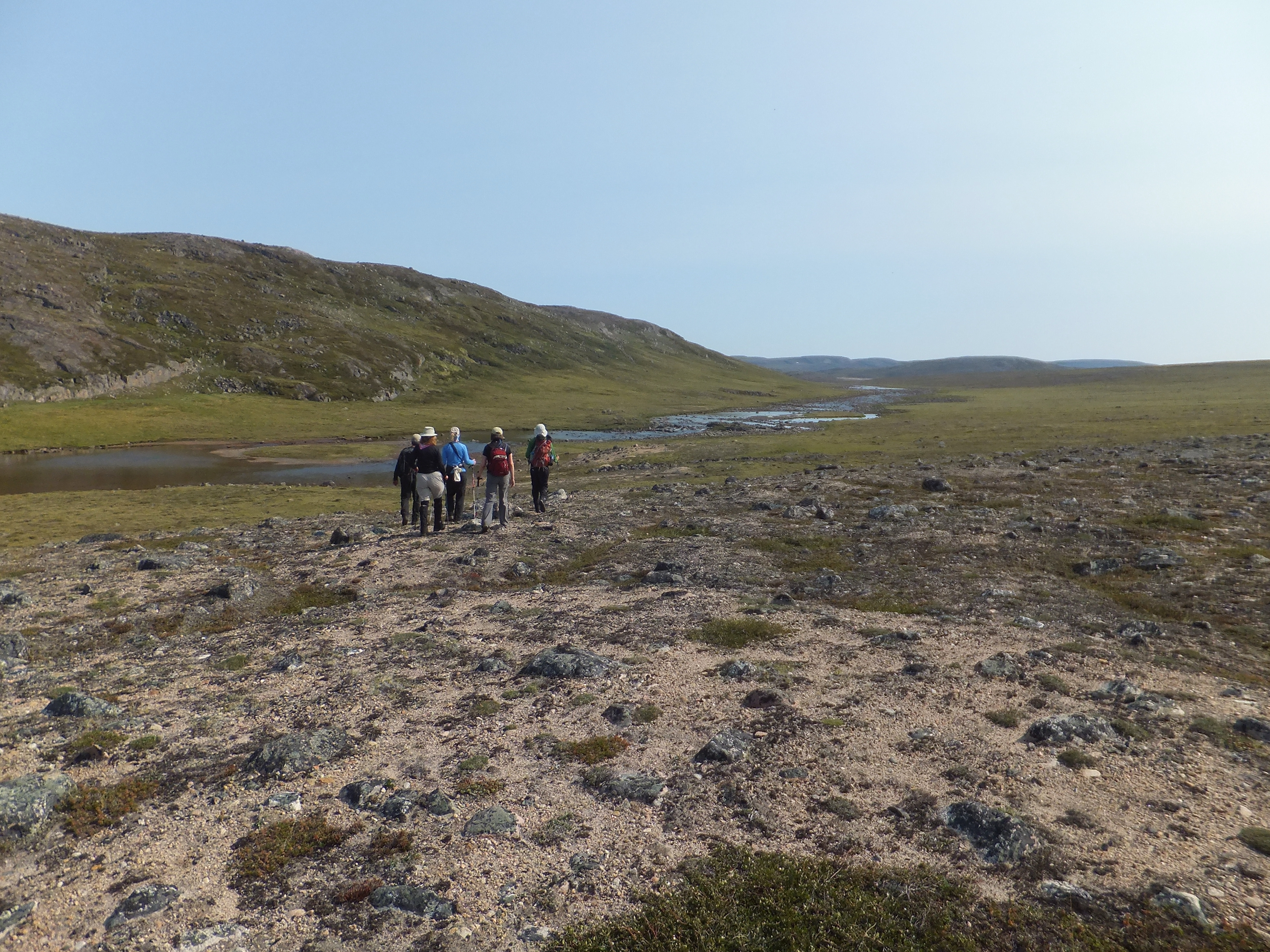
East fork of Sila River

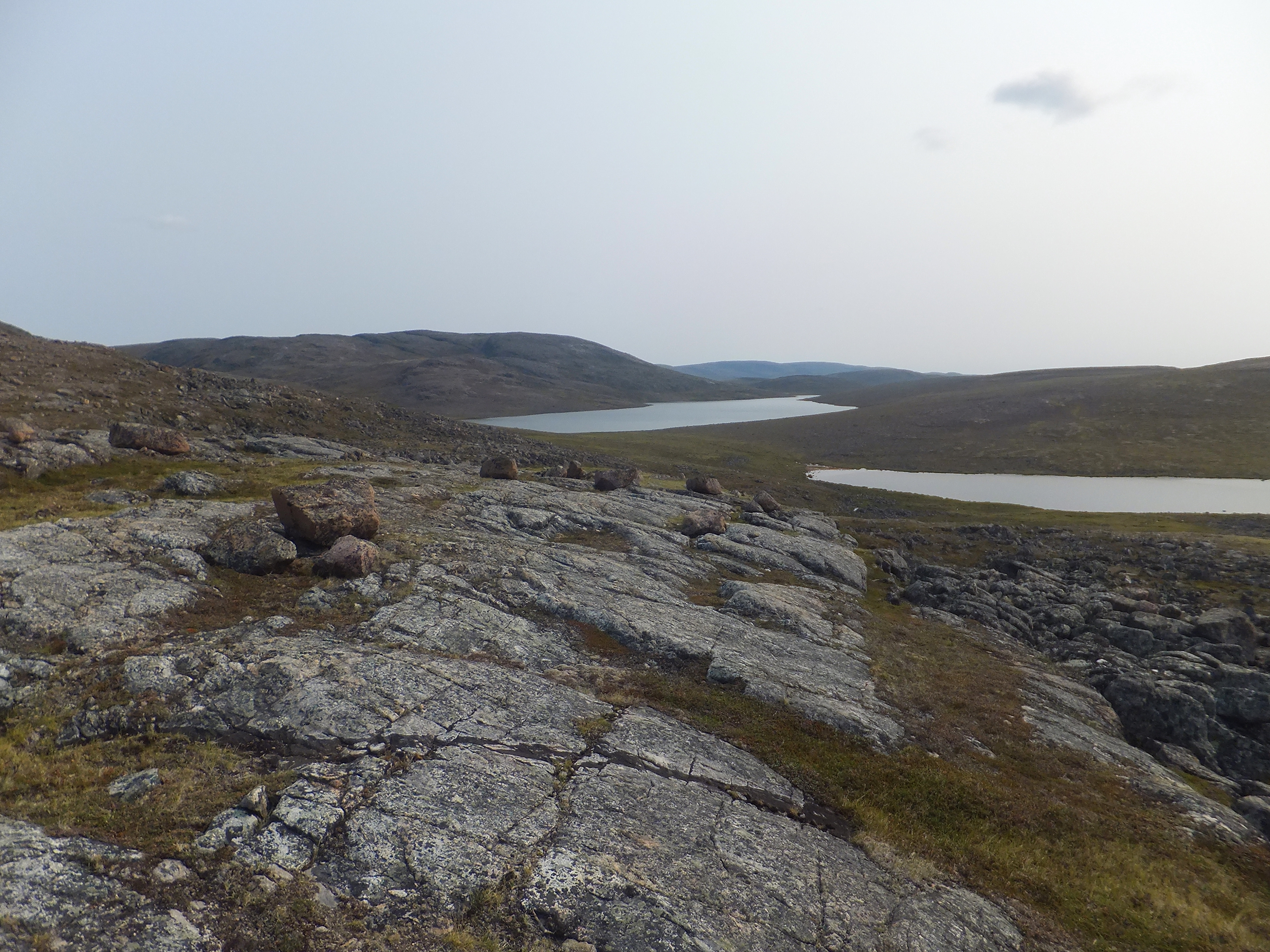
Park interior beyond Sila River

== Books ==
- Nunavut Handbook, Iqaluit 2004 ISBN 0-9736754-0-3
- Walk, Ansgar: Der Polarbär kam spät abends – Skizzen von der Wager Bay, Pendragon Verlag Bielefeld, 2002 ISBN 3-934872-22-0 (German) [“The Polar Bear Came Late at Night: Sketches of Wager Bay”; there is no English edition of the book.]

== See also ==
- List of national parks of Canada
- List of protected areas of Nunavut
