= Nattilik =

Former territorial electoral district in Nunavut, Canada

Nattilik (Inuktitut syllabics: ᓇᑦᑎᓕᒃ; Inuktitut pronunciation: [natːilik]) was a territorial electoral district (riding) for the Legislative Assembly of Nunavut, Canada. The riding consisted of the communities of Gjoa Haven and Taloyoak. Gjoa Haven is now a part of the Gjoa Haven riding and Taloyoak is a part of the Netsilik riding.

The seat became vacant as of 22 February due to the resignation of former Member of the Legislative Assembly, Enuk Pauloosie. Clerk of the assembly, John Quirke, said that a by-election must be held within six months. A by-election was held 26 April 2010, with Jeannie Ugyuk winning the seat.

== Election results ==
=== 1999 election ===
1999 Nunavut general election
Name	Vote	%
Uriash Puqiqnak	179	25.79%
Joseph W. Aglukkaq	161	23.20%
Charlie Cahill	149	21.47%
Steve Alookee	83	11.96%
Wally Mimurana Porter	65	9.37%
Anthony Anguttitauruq	57	8.21%
Total Valid Ballots	694	100%
Voter Turnout %	Rejected Ballots	

=== 2004 election ===
2004 Nunavut general election
Name	Vote	%
Leona Aglukkaq	305	42.84%
David Irqiut	203	28.51%
Anthony Anguttitauruq	130	18.26%
Simon Qingnaqtuq	30	4.21%
Ruediger H. J. Rasch	28	3.93%
Sonny Porter	11	1.55%
Tom Akoak	5	0.70%
Total Valid Ballots	712	100%
Voter Turnout 107.04%	Rejected Ballots 3	

=== 2008 election ===
2008 Nunavut general election
Name	Vote	%
Enuk Pauloosie	229	34.5%
Jeannie Ugyuk	197	29.7%
Louie Kamookak	192	29.0%
Paul Ikuallaq	45	6.8%
Total Valid Ballots	663	100%
Voter Turnout 83.7%	Rejected Ballots 4	

=== 2010 by-election ===
April 26, 2010 by-election
Name	Vote	%
Jeannie Ugyuk	358	52.6%
Anthony Angutittauruq	196	28.8%
Joseph Aglukkaq	127	18.6%
Total Valid Ballots	681	100%
Voter Turnout 72.03%	Rejected Ballots 6	

== See also ==
- List of Nunavut territorial electoral districts
- Canadian provincial electoral districts
