= Enuk Pauloosie =

Canadian politician

MLA for Nattilik
- In office 27 October 2008 – 22 February 2010
- Preceded by: Leona Aglukkaq
- Succeeded by: Jeannie Ugyuk

Personal details
- Born: 1961 (age 64–65) Taloyoak, Nunavut
- Party: non-partisan consensus government

Enuk Pauloosie is an Inuk Canadian, a former politician who was elected as the Member of the Legislative Assembly for the electoral district of Nattilik in the Legislative Assembly of Nunavut in the 2008 territorial election. His, now defunct, riding of Nattilik encompassed the communities of Gjoa Haven and Taloyoak, Nunavut.

== Before politics ==
Enuk Pauloosie was born in Spence Bay, Northwest Territories (now Taloyoak, Nunavut), in 1961. He had taken many jobs in both the public and private sectors prior to his 2008 election to the electoral district of Nattilik. These positions included five years as a police officer with the Royal Canadian Mounted Police in the communities of Baker Lake and Cambridge Bay. Pauloosie was also the General Manager of Housing in Gjoa Haven, the Assistant Manager of the Kikertak Co-op in Gjoa Haven and a board member of both the Gjoa Haven Co-op and the local Hunters and Trappers Association.

From 1995 to 1999, he served as the Planning and Land Administrator for the Gjoa Haven community, and has also served as the Lands Officer for the Kivalliq Inuit Association in Cambridge Bay and Kugluktuk.

== Political career ==
In 2008, Pauloosie ran in the Nunavut general election in the riding of Nattilik. He campaigned on a platform of concern for housing, education (especially ensuring that more Inuit traditional values are taught in schools), economic growth, municipal issues and tourism. Out of 663 electors, Pauloosie captured 229 votes, or 34.5%. This result was 32 votes (4.8%) above the next most popular candidate, Jeannie Kanayuk Ugyuk.

In June 2009, Pauloosie was suspended from sittings of the Legislative Assembly of Nunavut without pay for the entire spring session for being "persistently absent without reasonable explanation from recent meetings of the Legislative Assembly’s committees and caucuses". The motion to suspend Pauloosie was passed without opposition. He resumed his seat in the fall session of the Legislative Assembly.

In November 2009, Pauloosie called upon the Government of Nunavut to ban all of its employees from flying Air Canada to support northern airlines such as First Air and Canadian North.

On 22 February 2010, Pauloosie presented a letter of resignation to James Arreak, the Speaker of the Legislative Assembly. Pauloosie said that he was resigning for personal reasons but did not expand on them. Clerk of the assembly, John Quirke, said that by-election must be held within six months.

== Personal life ==
Enuk Pauloosie is married to his wife Celine and has two sons.
