= Emiliano Qirngnuq =

Canadian politician

Emiliano Qirngnuq MLA

Member of the Legislative Assembly of Nunavut for Netsilik
- In office February 8, 2016 – September 20, 2021
- Preceded by: Jeannie Ugyuk
- Succeeded by: Inagayuk Quqqiaq

Personal details
- Party: non-partisan consensus government

Emiliano Qirngnuq is a Canadian politician, who was elected as the Member of the Legislative Assembly for the electoral district of Netsilik in the Legislative Assembly of Nunavut in a by-election held 8 February 2016. He was reelected in the 2017 Nunavut general election but defeated in the 2021 Nunavut general election by Inagayuk Quqqiaq. He ran again in the 2025 Nunavut general election, when both he and Quqqiaq were defeated by Cecile Nelvana Lyall.

Qirngnuq is from the hamlet of Kugaaruk, Nunavut and was formerly the manager of the Koomiut Co-Op. Qirngnuq stated that he wanted to make language preservation a priority.
