= Mary Qayuaryuk =

Inuk artist (1908-1982)

- Born: April 25, 1908
- Died: June 7, 1982 (aged 74)

Mary Qayuaryuk (April 25, 1908 – June 7, 1982), also known as Kudjuakjuk, was an Inuk printmaker and midwife. She settled in Cape Dorset in 1966 after living off the land. She was the first woman elected to the Cape Dorset Community Council and between 1966 and 1982 she worked with the West Baffin Eskimo Co-operative. She was married to Kopapik "A" and three of her daughters also became artists, Qaunaq Mikkigak, Sheokjuke Toonoo, and Laisa Qayuaryuk.

Her work was focused on animals, and owls and other birds in particular. Her work is included in the collections of the National Gallery of Canada, and the Portland Art Museum. She had exhibits at The Innuit Gallery of Eskimo Art, Winnipeg Art Gallery, Inuit Gallery of Vancouver, Arctic Artistry, Feheley Fine Arts, and the Frye Art Museum among others.

Her granddaughter, Ovilu Tunnillie (1949–2014) was an Inuk sculptor.
