= Qarmaq =

Type of inter-seasonal, single-room family dwelling used by Inuit

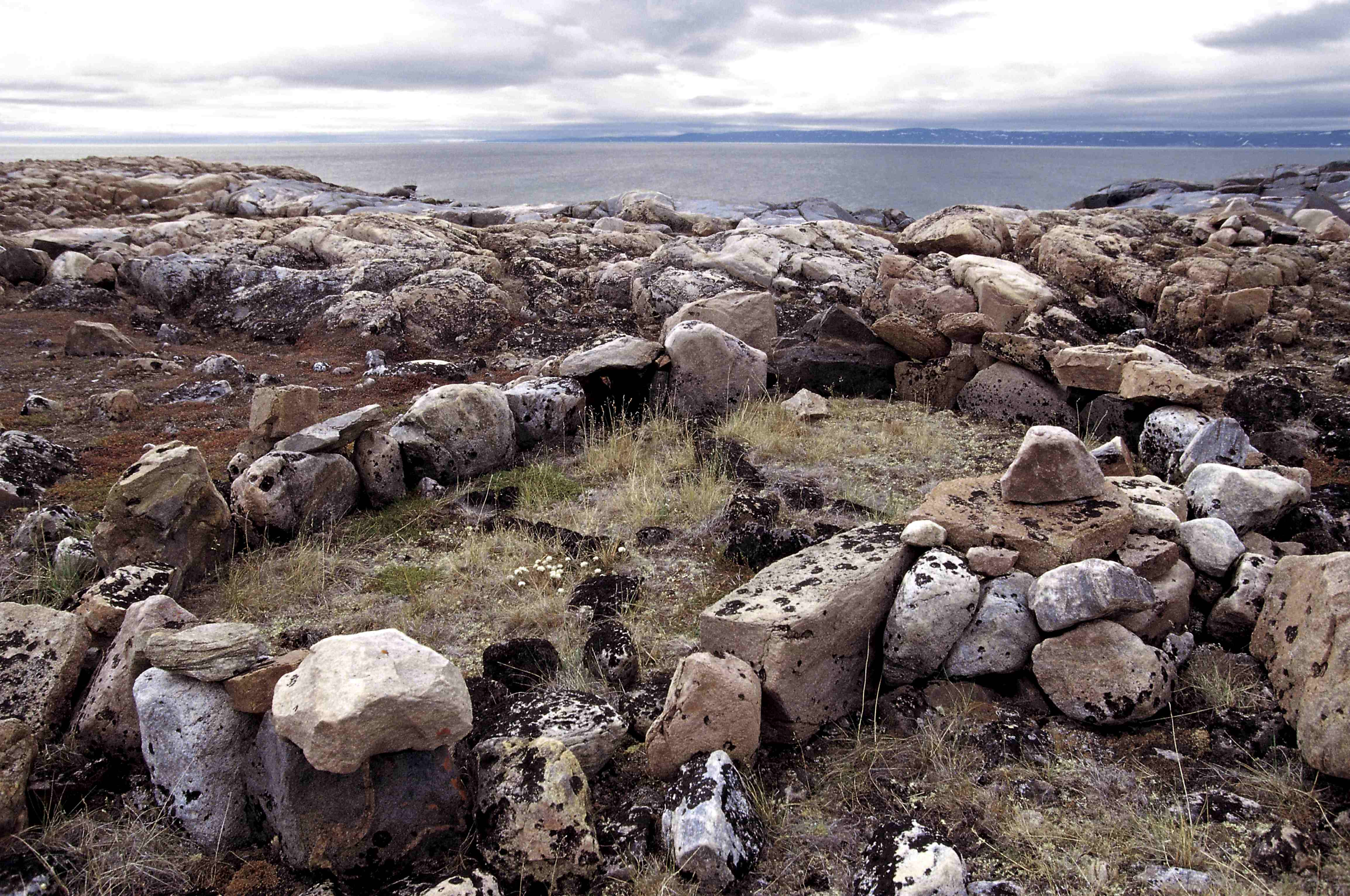
Thule qarmaq relics in Ukkusiksalik National Park

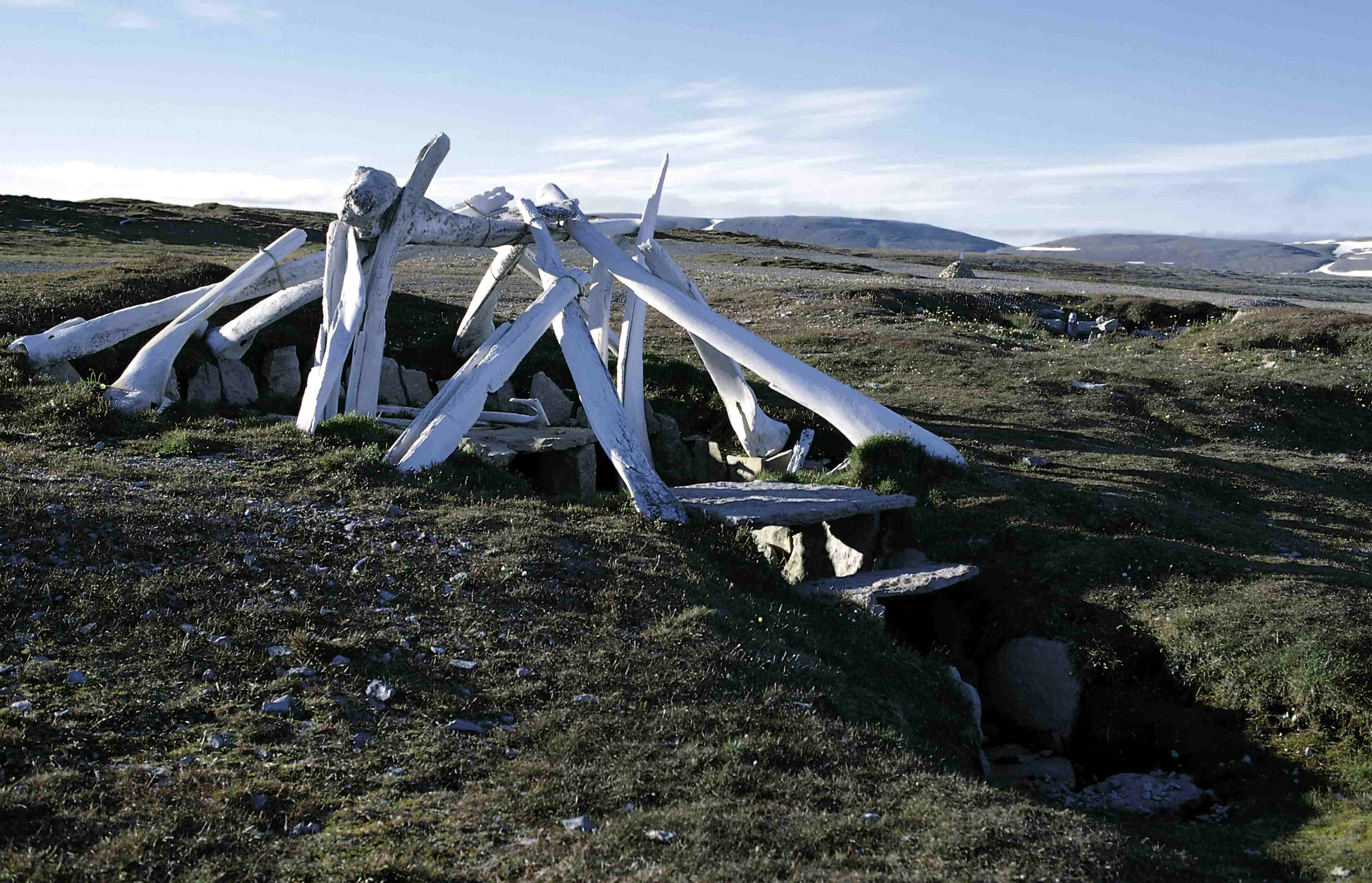
Qarmaq (whale bone roof reconstructed) near Resolute, Nunavut

Qarmaq (plural: "qarmat") is an Inuktitut term for a type of inter-seasonal, single-room family dwelling used by Inuit. To the Central Inuit of Northern Canada, it refers to a hybrid of a tent and igloo, or tent and sod house. Depending on the season, the lower portion was constructed of snow blocks or stone, while the upper portion used skins or canvas. To the Kalaallit of Greenland, qarmaq refers to the dwelling's wall. Qarmaq were built in the transitional seasons of fall and spring with a circular wall of stone, sod, or blocks of snow, a framework usually made from animal bones, which were covered with a skin.

== History ==
Qarmaqs were used by the Inuit up to the 1950s. They were used as early as the Thule people, predominantly during the cold season. In winter, they also lived in igloo, especially while traveling, but when possible, the qarmaq was the preference.

== Architecture ==
Finding the appropriate site for the qarmaq included understanding the geological layout of an area in relationship to elements of weather. Its construction involved men, women and children.

=== Snow qarmaq ===
Men collected and pieced together boulders and framework. Lacking timber, the framework was usually made of bone, preferably whale bone. Women and children gathered tundra moss for crevices, and prepared skins for roofing and siding. After winter snow arrived, the men used long knives to cut up blocks of snow, placing them in an outwardly direction for further protection. When the outer casing was attacked by the weather or gnawed on by wolves or foxes, women patched it up again and again, often with numb fingers in the freezing cold and biting wind.

=== Sod qarmaq ===
Summer tents, which were easy to transport, gave way to the sod qarmaq in fall.

== Interior ==
Inside, qarmaqs offered warmth only by the flame of the qulliq. The sleeping area was slightly elevated and used caribou skin for padding.
