= Netsilik (electoral district) =

Territorial electoral district in Nunavut, Canada

Nunavut electoral district
- Boundaries of Netsilik

Territorial electoral district
- Legislature: Legislative Assembly of Nunavut
MLA
Cecile Nelvana Lyall
- District created: 2013
- First contested: 2013
- Last contested: 2025

Netsilik (Inuktitut: ᓇᑦᑎᓕᒃ) is a territorial electoral district (riding) for the Legislative Assembly of Nunavut, Canada. The riding consists of the communities of Taloyoak and Kugaaruk. The district was created prior to the 28 October 2013 general election. The communities were previously in Nattilik and Akulliq.

Jeannie Ugyuk was chosen as the Family Services Minister in the 4th Nunavut Legislature. On 7 November 2015, a leadership review of the cabinet was held and as a result of a non-confidence vote a motion was made to remove Ugyuk from cabinet. On 9 November, prior to discussion on the motion, Ugyuk resigned both from cabinet and as MLA and the motion was withdrawn. A by-election was held in February 2016.

== Members of the Legislative Assembly ==
† by-election

Parliament	Years	Member
4th	2013–2016	Jeannie Ugyuk
4th†	2016–2017	Emiliano Qirngnuq
5th	2017–2021	Emiliano Qirngnuq
6th	2021–2025	Inagayuk Quqqiaq
7th	2025–present	Cecile Nelvana Lyall

== Election results ==
=== 2025 election ===
2025 Nunavut general election
Candidate	Votes	%
Cecile Nelvana Lyall	294	46.7
Emiliano Qirngnuq	253	40.2
Inagayuk Joseph Quqqiaq	63	10.0
Johnny Qilluniq	20	3.2
Mary Anaumiq Neeveacheak	0	0.0
Eligible voters		963
Total valid ballots		633
Rejected ballots		1
Turnout		65.80%

=== 2021 election ===
2021 Nunavut general election
Candidate	Votes	%
Inagayuk Joseph Quqqiaq	222	45.1
Emiliano Qirngnuq	187	38.0
Simon Qingnaqtuq	83	16.9
Eligible voters		914
Total valid ballots		492
Rejected ballots		0
Turnout		53.8%

=== 2017 election ===
2017 Nunavut general election
Candidate	Votes	%
Emiliano Qirngnuq	310	68.7
Joe Tulurialik	141	31.3
Eligible voters		823
Total valid ballots		451
Rejected ballots		4
Turnout		54.82%

=== 2016 by-election ===
2016 Nunavut general election
Candidate	Votes	%
Emiliano Qirngnuq	137	31.21
Tars Angutingunirk	116	26.42
John Ningark	65	14.81
Wesley Totalik Sr.	64	14.58
Joseph Quqqiaq	57	12.98
Eligible voters		751
Total valid ballots		439
Rejected ballots		7
Turnout		59.39%

=== 2013 election ===
2013 Nunavut general election
Candidate	Votes
Jeannie Ugyuk	Acclaimed

== See also ==
- List of Nunavut territorial electoral districts
- Canadian provincial electoral districts
