= Lucy Meeko =

Inuk artist

- Born: 1929
- Died: 2004 (aged 74–75); Kuujjuaraapik, Quebec, Canada
- Known for: Sculpture, printmaking, basketry, sewing

Lucy Meeko (1929–2004) was an Inuk artist known for her multidisciplinary work in sculpture, printmaking, basketry and sewing. Meeko was born in Kuujjuaraapik, Quebec. Her career as a sculptor began in the 1950s; in the 1970s, together with her husband Noah, she created engravings for the Kuujjuarapic Cooperative.

Meeko's work was featured in Keeping our Stories Alive: The Sculpture of Canada's Inuit along with the work of Ovilu Tunnillie and Uriash Puqiqnak.

Her work is included in the permanent collections of the National Gallery of Canada, the Winnipeg Art Gallery, the Bibliotheque et Archives nationales du Quebec, the Nelson Atkins Museum of Art and the McCord Museum, Montreal.

Meeko died in 2004 from smoke inhalation, while attempting to rescue her husband Noah from a house fire in Kuujjuaraapik.
