= Taloyoak Airport =

Airport in Nunavut, Canada

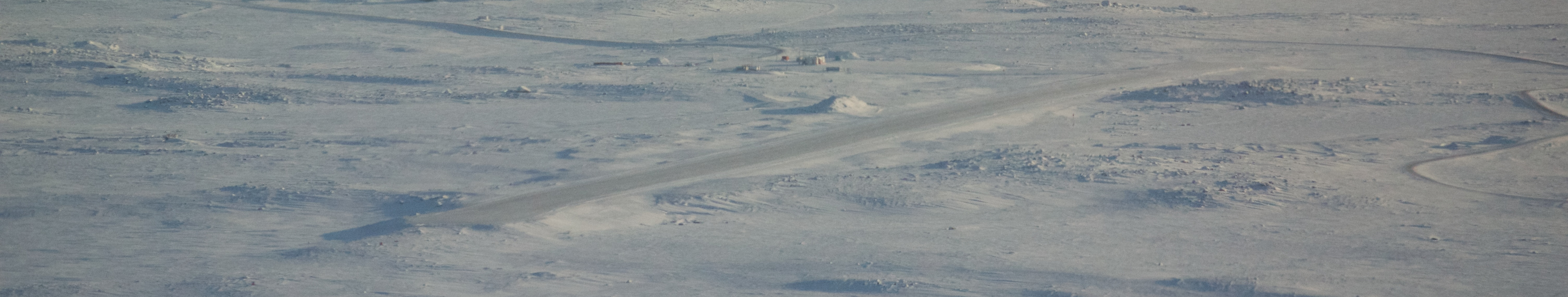
- Aerial view of airport
- IATA: YYH; ICAO: CYYH; WMO: 71580

Summary
- Airport type: Public
- Operator: Government of Nunavut
- Location: Taloyoak, Nunavut
- Time zone: MST (UTC−07:00)
  - Summer (DST): MDT (UTC−06:00)
- Elevation AMSL: 90 ft / 27 m
- Coordinates: 69°32′48″N 093°34′37″W

Map
- Location in Nunavut CYYH (Canada)

Runways
Direction	Length		Surface
Direction	ft	m	Surface
15/33	4,009	1,222	Gravel

Statistics (2018)
- Aircraft movements: 1,929
- Sources: Canada Flight Supplement; Environment Canada; Movements from Statistics Canada.

Taloyoak Airport (IATA: YYH, ICAO: CYYH) is located 0.75 nautical miles (1.39 km; 0.86 mi) west of Taloyoak, Nunavut, Canada, and is operated by the Government of Nunavut.

== Airlines and destinations ==
Airlines	Destinations
Canadian North	Cambridge Bay, Gjoa Haven, Kugaaruk, Yellowknife
