= Uriash Puqiqnak =

Canadian politician

MLA for Nattilik
- In office 1999–2004
- Preceded by: first member
- Succeeded by: Leona Aglukkaq

Personal details
- Born: April 15, 1946 (age 80) Chantrey Inlet, Northwest Territories (now Nunavut)
- Party: non-partisan consensus government

Uriash Puqiqnak, CM (born April 15, 1946) is an experienced soapstone carver and former territorial and municipal level politician in Canada. He served as Mayor of Gjoa Haven, Nunavut and was a member of the Nunavut Legislature from 1999 until 2004. Uriash Puqiqnak briefly served as acting speaker in 2000 after Levi Barnabas' resignation.

== Carving ==
Puqiqnak is a famous soapstone carver, his works are on display all over Canada. He was appointed as a Member of the Order of Canada on July 29, 2005. His work is also featured in Keeping our Stories Alive: The Sculpture of Canada's Inuit along with the work of Ovilu Tunnillie and Lucy Meeko.

== Political career ==
Puqiqnak began his political career when he was elected mayor of Gjoa Haven, Nunavut.

Puqiqnak was elected to the Nunavut Legislature in the 1999 Nunavut general election. He won the Nattilik electoral district, defeating five other candidates in a hotly contested race with nearly 26% of the popular vote. During his time in office, he pushed the territorial government to develop better programs to promote home grown intuit art and discourage counterfeit carving from entering the marketplace.

He would only serve for one term as in the legislative assembly and chose not to run for re-election when it was dissolved in 2004. He left politics to spend more time with his family.

Despite leaving politics, Puqiqnak is still involved in community service. He currently serves as a member of the Nunavut Tourism Board and is chair of Parks Canada History steering committee.
