= Inagayuk Quqqiaq =

Canadian politician

Member of the Legislative Assembly of Nunavut for Netsilik
- In office November 19, 2021 – October 27, 2025
- Preceded by: Emiliano Qirngnuq
- Succeeded by: Cecile Nelvana Lyall

Personal details
- Party: non-partisan consensus government

Inagayuk Joseph Quqqiaq is a Canadian Inuk politician, who was elected to the Legislative Assembly of Nunavut in the 2021 Nunavut general election. He represented the electoral district of Netsilik until his defeat in 2025.
