= Central Inuit =

Central Inuit are Inuit of northern Canada, their designation determined by geography and their tradition of snowhouses ("igloos"), fur clothing, and sled dogs. They are differentiated from Alaska's Iñupiat and Greenland's Kalaallit. Central Inuit are subdivided into smaller groupings which include the Kivallirmiut (Caribou Inuit), Netsilik, Iglulingmiut (Iglulik), and Baffin Island Inuit. Though Copper Inuit are geographically located in the central Arctic, they are considered to be socially and ideologically distinct from the Central Inuit.

The Central Inuit conception of the world's structure has gender qualities. Women are considered to be connected to the sea, sea mammals, sea tools, and winter. Meanwhile, men are seen as connected with the land, land animals, land tools, and summer. Gender concept also affects burials. They do not commonly create images of supernatural powers, preferring instead to make amulets using pieces of things including animals.

Central Inuit lived in multiple types of dwellings. In addition to igloos, they also lived in qarmaqs.

== See also ==
- Inuit Nunangat
