= Netsilik School =

Location
- Box 9 Taloyoak, Nunavut, X0B 1B0; Canada; 69°32′19″N 93°31′55″W

Information
- Motto: Culture, Tradition and Learning
- Founded: 1972
- School board: Kitikmeot School Operations
- Superintendent: Jonathan Bird
- Principal: Gina Pizzo
- Grades: Kindergarten to 12
- Enrollment: approx. 315 (August, 2010)
- Language: Inuktitut and English
- Colours: Blue and White
- Mascot: Seal
- Team name: Seals
- Website: www.polarnet.ca/~netsilik/

Netsilik School in Taloyoak, Nunavut, Canada, serves a population of about 300 students from Kindergarten up to grade 12, as well as a preschool program funded by Aboriginal Headstart Canada which has approximately 40 students. The school was built in the 1970s and the current principal, Gina Pizzo, was named as one of Canada's outstanding principals in 2012. The preschool program, up to grade 3, provides Inuktitut immersion, and a 60/40% Inuktitut/English program in the higher grades.
