= Toonoo Tunnillie =

Inuk artist (1920-1969)

- Born: 1920
- Died: 1969 (aged 48–49)

Toonoo Tunnillie (1920–1969) was an Inuk artist and the father of notable artist Oviloo Tunnillie.

== Biography ==
Toonoo was the youngest of five children, many of whom died at a young age. Little is known about his teenage years, however by the late 1950s he was earning a living as a well-respected carver primarily selling to fur traders in the Cape Dorset area. He became one of the earliest Inuit artists to achieve prominence for his sculpture outside of the Canadian North.

Tunnillie was a major influence on his daughter Oviloo, inspiring her own interest in carving. Following the birth of his children, Toonoo supported his family through carving primarily serpentinite stone. In 1959, he was hospitalized in Southern Canada for nearly a year, for unknown reasons. In 1966, Toonoo sold his daughter's work through a Hudson's Bay Company trading post several kilometer's away from the family's home, marking the start of her formal artistic career.

Tunnillie's wife Sheojuke was also an artist, known for printmaking.

During a hunting trip in 1969 with his brother-in-law Mikkigak Kingwatsiak, Toonoo perished in what was believed to be a hunting accident, but later revealed to be murder.

== Major exhibitions ==
- Coronation Exhibition, Gimpel Fils London (1953)
- Canadian Eskimo Art, organized by the Department of Northern Affairs of National Resources (1954)

== Collections ==
- Winnipeg Art Gallery
- Musée national des beaux-arts du Québec
