= Ovilu Tunnillie =

Canadian Inuk sculptor (1949-2014)

- Born: December 20, 1949; Kangia, Baffin Island, Northwest Territories (now Nunavut)
- Died: June 12, 2014 (aged 64)
- Citizenship: Canadian (Inuit)
- Occupation: Artist/Sculptor
- Years active: 1972–2012
- Spouse: Iola Tunnillie
- Parents: Toonoo Tunnillie (1920–1969) (father); Sheokjuke (1928–2012) (mother)
- Relatives: Mary Qayuaryuk (1908–1982) (maternal grandmother)

Ovilu (also spelled Oviloo) Tunnillie RCA (December 20, 1949 – June 12, 2014) was born at Kangia, Baffin Island, Northwest Territories (now Nunavut) and was an Inuk sculptor. Her carvings served as her commentary on both traditional and changing contemporary Inuit culture. She was one of the first Inuit artists to work with an autobiographical theme.

At a young age, Oviloo's family was disrupted by the government's forced removal of tuberculosis (TB) patients to sanitariums in southern Canada. She was taken to Clearwater Lake Indian Hospital in Manitoba, where she spent two year-long stays. The experience of dehumanization and alienation by white officials remained a major theme in her art.

Tunnillie came from a noted artistic family. Her parents, Sheojuke Toonoo (1928–2012) and Toonoo (1920–1969) were noted artists and her grandmother, Mary Qayuaryuk (1908–1982), (also known as Kudjuakjuk) was also a sculptor, who inspired her to become a sculptor. However as an eldest daughter, Ovilu's interest in sculpture was unaligned with typical social roles, and she often faced pressure from family to abandon her practice at a young age.

== Career ==
Tunnillie carved her first work, Mother and Child, in 1966 when she was 17 years old. Tunnillie's works are rendered in the distinctive serpentinite rock that is common to South Baffin. Her style is distinctive, employing an architectural quality. Themes in her work range from alcohol abuse and sexual assault to memories of her time in a southern TB clinic freely depicting the inter-cultural reality of the contemporary Inuit women.

Ovilu quickly became the primary breadwinner for her family, and exhibited in early exhibitions with what would become the West Baffin Ekismo Cooperative. She began exploring materials and practices such as metalworking, and switched to electric carving tools following surgery on her arm in this period. Tunnillie had her first solo exhibition in June 1981 at the Canadian Guild of Crafts in Montreal, after which she was represented by Dorset Fine Arts (DFA) in Toronto. In the following years she exhibited internationally including in West Germany in 1988 and the United States in 1993.

Her work is featured in several private and public collections including the Canadian Guild of Crafts Quebec, the Canadian Museum of Civilization, the National Gallery of Canada, the Winnipeg Art Gallery, and the Hermitage Museum, Leningrad. Her work is also featured in Keeping our Stories Alive: The Sculpture of Canada's Inuit along with the work of Lucy Meeko and Uriash Puqiqnak.

She was elected to the Royal Canadian Academy in 2003. Though she was active in the contemporary art world, she failed to generate the sales she needed to support her family living in Toronto and Ottawa. Her contemporaries remember the financial stress placing a strain on Oviloo's work, transforming her more conceptual pieces to 'pedestrian' decorative works. Oviloo spent the early 2000s between Montreal and Vancouver, before returning permanently to Cape Dorset in 2006. She died of ovarian cancer in 2014.

== Exhibitions ==
- Debut - Cape Dorset Jewellery, Canadian Guild of Crafts Quebec (1976)
- Oviloo Toonoo, Canadian Guild of Crafts Quebec, Montreal (1981)
- Arctic Vision: Art of the Canadian Inuit, travelling exhibition put on by the Department of Indian Affairs and Northern Development and Canadian Arctic Producers, Ottawa (1984–1986)
- Building on Strengths: New Inuit Art from the Collection, Winnipeg Art Gallery (1988)
- Hermitage - 89: New Exhibits, Hermitage Museum, Leningrad, Soviet Union
- Oviloo Tunnillie: A Woman's History in Stone, Winnipeg Art Gallery (2016)
