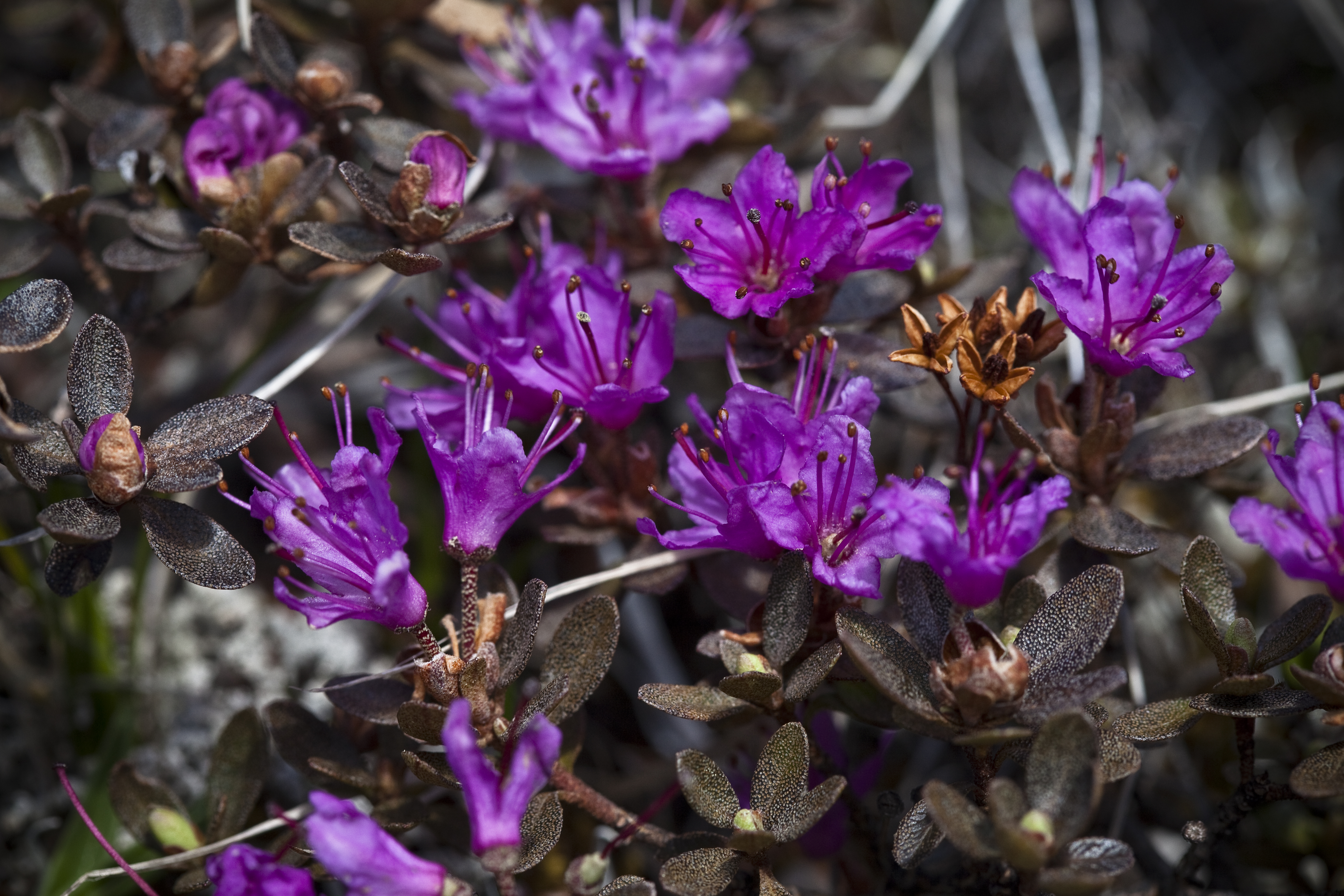

Conservation status
- Secure (NatureServe)

Scientific classification
- Kingdom: Plantae
- Clade: Tracheophytes
- Clade: Angiosperms
- Clade: Eudicots
- Clade: Asterids
- Order: Ericales
- Family: Ericaceae
- Genus: Rhododendron
- Species: R. lapponicum

Binomial name
- Rhododendron lapponicum (L.) Wahlenb.

Synonyms
- Azalea lapponica L.; Rhododendron confertissimum Nakai; Rhododendron lapponicum subsp. parvifolium (Adams) T. Yamaz.; Rhododendron palustre Turcz.; Rhododendron parviflorum F. Schmidt; Rhododendron parvifolium Adams; Rhododendron parvifolium subsp. confertissimum (Nakai) A.P. Khokhr.

= Rhododendron lapponicum =

Species of subarctic plant

Rhododendron lapponicum is a dwarf species of Rhododendron native to arctic and subarctic regions of North America, Europe, and Asia. It is commonly known as Lapland rosebay, rhododendron de Laponie in French-speaking Canada, qijjuttaaqpait tipilitt (ᕿᔾᔪᑦᑖᖅᐸᐃᑦ ᑎᐱᓕᑦᑦ) in Inuktitut-speaking regions of Canada, and gāoshān dùjuān (高山杜鹃) in China. The specific epithet lapponicum was given to the species by Carl Linnaeus, naming it after the Swedish region of Lapland.

== Description ==
R. lapponicum is a small perennial subshrub that may grow in prostrate or erect forms depending on local conditions. In harsh alpine environments, it may reach only 5 cm (2.0 in) in height. Elsewhere, it may form a multi-branched shrub 20 cm (7.9 in) to 1 m (39 in) tall. It is able to produce clonal colonies through spreading rhizomes, with a single colony having a lifespan of several decades.

The evergreen leaves can be elliptic, ovate, or obovate in shape and are 0.4–2.5 cm (0.16–0.98 in) long. They are attached to the stem on petioles 1.5–4 mm long. The leaf is coriaceous with the entire surface, including the petiole, being covered in golden or rust-colored scales. The leaf margins are entire, and may be plane or revolute.

The inflorescence is a fascicled raceme with 3-6 flowers. Each flower is born on a pedicel 2.5–14 mm long. Both the pedicel and calyx are covered in rust-colored scales. The corolla is broadly funnel-shaped and 0.65-1.5 cm wide. The petals are violet rose to purple, and rarely white, in color. Each flower bears 5-10 stamens, 7–13 mm long. The plant flowers in spring and summer, with the exact timing dependent on latitude and elevation.

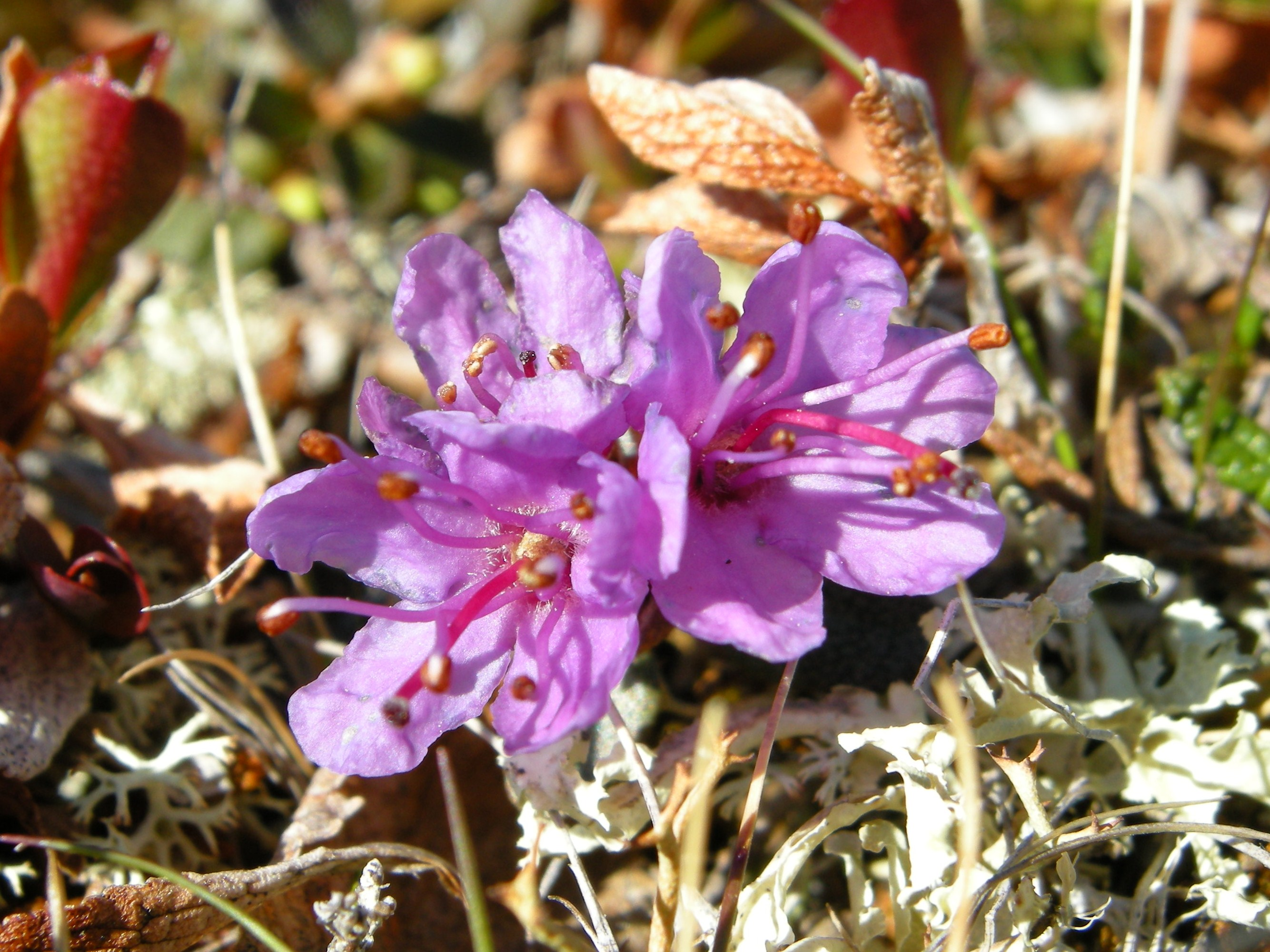
Flowering in Kolvik, Porsanger, Norway

The fruit is a cylindric-ovate capsule, 4–7 mm long by 2–3 mm wide, densely covered in rust-colored scales.

The seeds are ellipsoid in shape, smooth, yellowish in color, and 1-1.2 mm long.

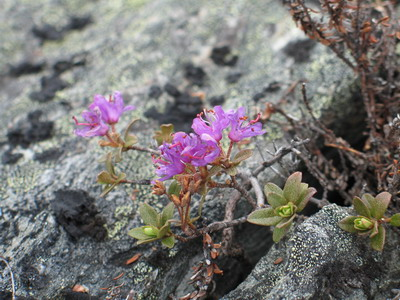
Small, hardy individual emerge from cracks in frost-weathered rocks in tundra environments

== Distribution and habitat ==
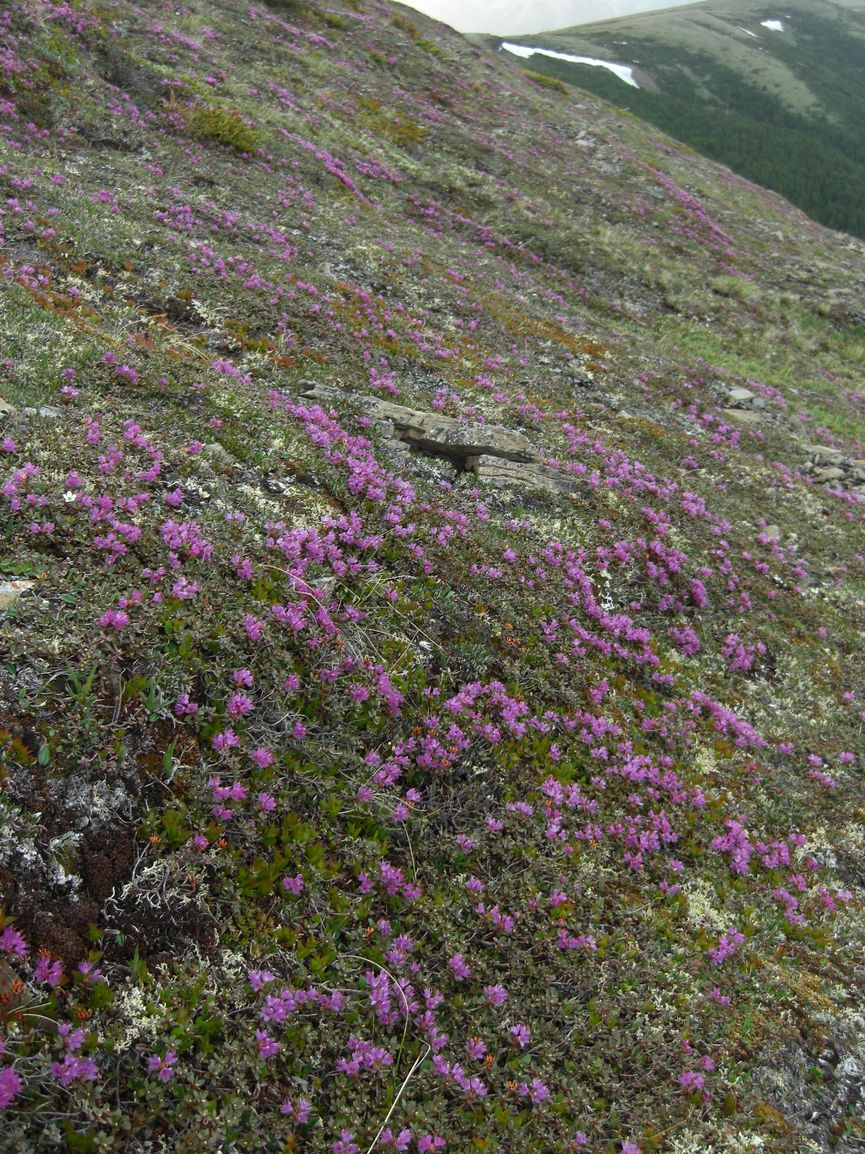
Blooming en masse in the alpine zone of Mount Stearn, AB, Canada

R. lapponicum has a wide-ranging circumpolar distribution, occurring in arctic and alpine tundra environments across northern North America, northern Europe, and northeastern Asia. It grows at elevations ranging from sea level to 1,900 m (6,200 ft). It may be found in rocky barrens, heaths, bogs, beach ridges, or sandy stream banks. In eastern alpine ecosystems, it is commonly associated with cushion-tussock and heath-shrub-rush plant communities.

In North America, it mostly occurs across Alaska, Canada, and Greenland. In western Greenland, it is known to hybridize with R. tomentosum producing the hybrid species R. × vanhoeffenii. In the contiguous United States, it is historically known from only four locations: Mount Marcy in New York, the Presidential Range in New Hampshire, Mount Katahdin in Maine, and two sandstone ledge sites in the Driftless Area of southwest Wisconsin. In July 2015, a previously unknown population of R. lapponicum was identified in Chittendon County, Vermont. It is unclear when this population became established, but there is no evidence to suggest it did not arrive by natural means. These disjunct populations likely represent remnants of a more widespread southerly distribution of the species that existed during, or soon after, the last glacial advancement.

In Europe, the species is native to the Scandinavian nations of Norway, Sweden, and Finland. In Asia, it can be found in Northeast China and Inner Mongolia, Mongolia, Japan, North Korea, and Siberia.

== Conservation status and threats ==
Due to its large range, abundant habitat, and broad habitat preferences, R. lapponicum is categorized by NatureServe as a globally secure (G5) species. In North America, it is designated as a threatened species in much of the southern extent of its range. It is critically imperiled (S1) in Maine, Nova Scotia, Vermont, and Wisconsin; and imperiled (S2) in Manitoba, New Hampshire, and New York. Like other alpine species, it is threatened by warming temperatures due to climate change, which may alter the distribution of plant communities at high elevations. Other potential local risks include trampling due to human recreation, and the decline of associated pollinator species.
