= Cecile Nelvana Lyall =

Canadian politician

The Honourable Cecile Nelvana Lyall MLA

Member of the Legislative Assembly of Nunavut for Netsilik
- Incumbent
- Assumed office October 27, 2025
- Preceded by: Joseph Inagayuk Quqqiaq

Member of the Executive Council of Nunavut
- Incumbent
- Assumed office November 20, 2025

Personal details
- Party: Non-partisan consensus government

Cecile Nelvana Lyall is a Canadian politician, who was elected to the Legislative Assembly of Nunavut in the 2025 Nunavut general election. She represents the electoral district of Netsilik.

Nelvana Lyall studied business administration at Red River College in Winnipeg. She is also a councillor for Taloyoak.
