= Taloyoak =

Hamlet in Nunavut, Canada

Taloyoak ᑕᓗᕐᔪᐊᖅ Talurjuaq
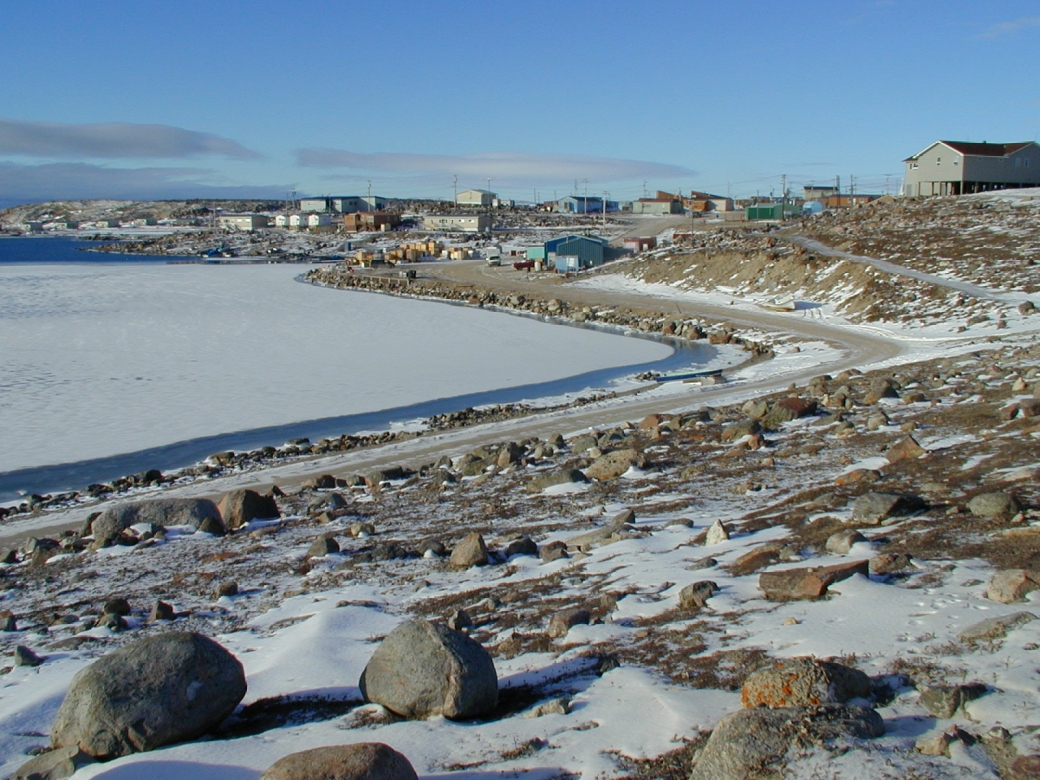
- Taloyoak in June

- Location within Nunavut Location within Canada
- Coordinates: 69°32′10″N 093°31′15″W
- Country: Canada
- Territory: Nunavut
- Region: Kitikmeot
- Electoral district: Netsilik

Government
  - Type: Hamlet council
  - Mayor: Chuck Pizzo-Lyall
  - MLA: Cecile Nelvana Lyall

Area (2021)
  - Total: 35.38 km^{2} (13.66 sq mi)
- Elevation: 28 m (92 ft)

Population (2021)
  - Total: 934
  - Density: 26.4/km^{2} (68/sq mi)
- Time zone: UTC−07:00 (MST)
  - Summer (DST): UTC−06:00 (MDT)
- Canadian Postal code: X0B 1B0
- Area code: 867

Taloyoak or Talurjuaq (Inuktitut syllabics: ᑕᓗᕐᔪᐊᖅ [taloʁjuˈaq]), formerly known as Spence Bay until 1 July 1992, although the body of water on which it is situated continues to be known as Spence Bay — same as the body of water on which Iqaluit is situated continues to be known as Frobisher Bay — (2021 population 934) is located on the Boothia Peninsula, in the Kitikmeot Region of Nunavut, Canada. The community is served only by air and by annual supply sealift. Taloyoak, the northernmost community in mainland Canada, in Inuktitut means "large blind", referring to a stone caribou blind or a screen used for caribou hunting. The community is situated 460 km (290 mi) east of the regional centre of Cambridge Bay, 1,224 km (761 mi) northeast of Yellowknife, Northwest Territories.

== Demographics ==
Federal census population history of Taloyoak
Year	Pop.	±%
1976	443	—
1981	431	−2.7%
1986	488	+13.2%
1991	580	+18.9%
1996	648	+11.7%
2001	720	+11.1%
2006	809	+12.4%
2011	899	+11.1%
2016	1,029	+14.5%
2021	934	−9.2%
Source: Statistics Canada

In the 2021 Canadian census conducted by Statistics Canada, Taloyoak had a population of 934 living in 203 of its 251 total private dwellings, a change of −9.2% from its 2016 population of 1,029. With a land area of 35.38 km^{2} (13.66 sq mi), it had a population density of 26.4/km^{2} (68.4/sq mi) in 2021.

Languages spoken are English and Inuktitut.

== Broadband communications ==
The community has been served by the Qiniq network since 2005. Qiniq is a fixed wireless service to homes and businesses, connecting to the outside world via a satellite backbone. The Qiniq network is designed and operated by SSi Canada. In 2017, the network was upgraded to 4G LTE technology, and 2G-GSM for mobile voice.

== Surrounding area ==
Taloyoak is surrounded by tundra and the ground is black/grey. To the north there is an impressive rock formation that looks similar to Uluru. Farther north is the Murchison Promontory, the northernmost mainland point of the Americas and of Canada.

== Climate ==
Taloyoak has a tundra climate ("ET"), a polar climate sub-type under the Köppen climate classification, with short but cool summers and long cold winters.

Climate data for Taloyoak (Taloyoak Airport) WMO ID: 71580; coordinates 69°33′N 93°35′W; elevation: 27.4 m (90 ft); 1981–2010 normals
Month	Jan	Feb	Mar	Apr	May	Jun	Jul	Aug	Sep	Oct	Nov	Dec	Year
Record high humidex	−8.3	−11.4	−5.8	0.4	4.4	20.5	24.6	22.2	12.1	4.2	−2.0	−1.7	24.6
Record high °C (°F)	−8.0 (17.6)	−11.0 (12.2)	−3.5 (25.7)	0.5 (32.9)	5.0 (41.0)	22.0 (71.6)	25.9 (78.6)	21.5 (70.7)	12.9 (55.2)	4.5 (40.1)	0.5 (32.9)	−1.5 (29.3)	25.9 (78.6)
Mean daily maximum °C (°F)	−30.3 (−22.5)	−30.1 (−22.2)	−25.4 (−13.7)	−15.5 (4.1)	−5.0 (23.0)	5.2 (41.4)	12.7 (54.9)	9.5 (49.1)	2.2 (36.0)	−7.2 (19.0)	−18.8 (−1.8)	−25.3 (−13.5)	−10.7 (12.7)
Daily mean °C (°F)	−33.7 (−28.7)	−33.7 (−28.7)	−29.5 (−21.1)	−20.3 (−4.5)	−9.1 (15.6)	2.1 (35.8)	8.4 (47.1)	6.2 (43.2)	−0.1 (31.8)	−10.3 (13.5)	−22.3 (−8.1)	−28.9 (−20.0)	−14.3 (6.3)
Mean daily minimum °C (°F)	−37.0 (−34.6)	−37.4 (−35.3)	−33.6 (−28.5)	−25.0 (−13.0)	−13.1 (8.4)	−1.1 (30.0)	4.0 (39.2)	2.9 (37.2)	−2.5 (27.5)	−13.4 (7.9)	−25.8 (−14.4)	−32.5 (−26.5)	−17.9 (−0.2)
Record low °C (°F)	−49.0 (−56.2)	−49.5 (−57.1)	−47.0 (−52.6)	−39.5 (−39.1)	−29.0 (−20.2)	−18.5 (−1.3)	−1.5 (29.3)	−4.0 (24.8)	−14.0 (6.8)	−33.0 (−27.4)	−40.2 (−40.4)	−46.0 (−50.8)	−49.5 (−57.1)
Record low wind chill	−66.6	−68.6	−66.3	−56.0	−36.9	−20.9	−3.9	−10.4	−22.4	−50.6	−53.5	−60.2	−68.6
Average precipitation mm (inches)	8.4 (0.33)	6.1 (0.24)	8.6 (0.34)	9.8 (0.39)	12.8 (0.50)	16.7 (0.66)	23.1 (0.91)	30.5 (1.20)	25.6 (1.01)	22.7 (0.89)	12.7 (0.50)	10.6 (0.42)	187.4 (7.38)
Average rainfall mm (inches)	0.0 (0.0)	0.0 (0.0)	0.0 (0.0)	0.0 (0.0)	1.3 (0.05)	12.7 (0.50)	22.4 (0.88)	29.9 (1.18)	13.9 (0.55)	0.7 (0.03)	0.0 (0.0)	0.0 (0.0)	80.9 (3.19)
Average snowfall cm (inches)	9.3 (3.7)	6.4 (2.5)	9.2 (3.6)	11.6 (4.6)	12.4 (4.9)	4.5 (1.8)	0.7 (0.3)	0.7 (0.3)	12.1 (4.8)	25.8 (10.2)	14.3 (5.6)	12.0 (4.7)	119.0 (46.9)
Average precipitation days (≥ 0.2 mm)	10.1	8.9	10.6	8.8	8.9	8.5	7.6	11.0	11.0	14.5	11.3	11.1	122.3
Average rainy days (≥ 0.2 mm)	0.0	0.0	0.0	0.0	0.5	5.8	7.5	10.7	5.1	0.5	0.0	0.0	30.0
Average snowy days (≥ 0.2 cm)	9.7	8.3	10.2	8.3	8.3	3.5	0.1	0.4	6.4	14.1	11.2	11.0	91.5
Average relative humidity (%)	74.6	73.8	72.3	77.9	83.7	80.2	67.2	72.9	82.4	86.2	79.2	76.6	77.2
Source: Environment and Climate Change Canada Canadian Climate Normals 1981–2010

== See also ==
- List of municipalities in Nunavut
- Bill Lyall
- Marten Hartwell
- David Pisurayak Kootook
- Netsilik
- Netsilik School
- Taloyoak Airport
