= Gender roles among the Indigenous peoples of North America =

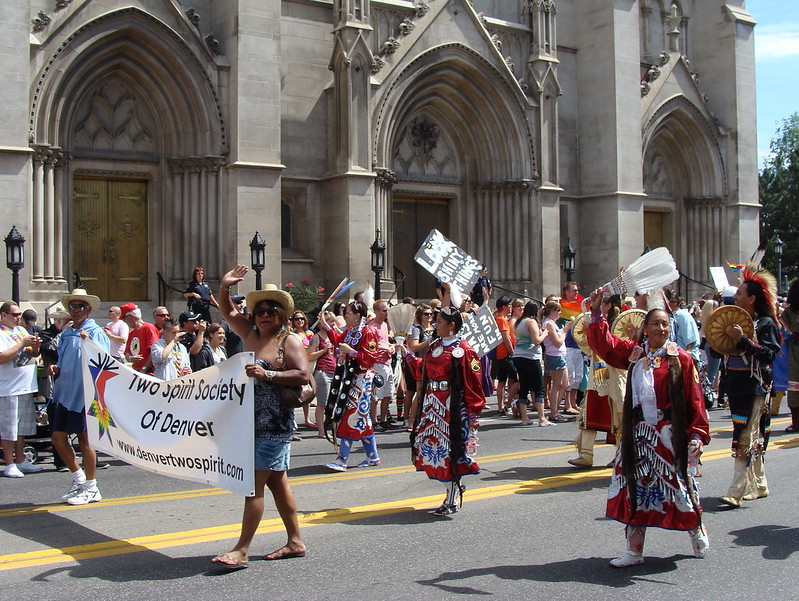
Two Spirit Society of Denver marches at PrideFest Denver, 2011

Traditional gender roles among Native American and First Nations peoples tend to vary greatly by region and community. As with all Pre-Columbian era societies, historical traditions may or may not reflect contemporary attitudes. Gender roles exhibited by Indigenous communities have been transformed in some aspects by Eurocentric, patriarchal norms and the perpetration of systematic oppression. In many communities, these things are not discussed with outsiders.

== Apache ==
Traditional Apache gender roles have many of the same skills learned by both females and males. All children traditionally learn how to cook, follow tracks, skin leather, sew stitches, ride horses, and use weapons. Typically, women gather vegetation such as fruits, roots, and seeds. Women often prepare the food. Men use weapons and tools to hunt animals such as Bison. It is expected that women do not participate in hunting, but the role of mothers is important. A puberty rite ceremony for young girls is an important event. Here the girl accepts her role as a woman and is blessed with a long life and fertility. Apache people typically live in matrilocal households, where a married couple live with the wife's family.

== Eastern Woodland societies ==
Eastern Woodland communities vary widely in whether they divide labor based on sex. In general, as in the Plains nations, women own the home while men's work may involve more travel. Narragansett men in farming communities have traditionally helped clear the fields, cultivate the crops, and assist with the harvesting, whereas women hold authority in the home. Among the Lenape, men and women have both participated in agriculture and hunting according to age and ability, although primary leadership in agriculture traditionally belongs to women, while men have generally held more responsibility in the area of hunting. Whether gained by hunting, fishing, or agriculture, older Lenape women take responsibility for community food distribution. Land management, whether used for hunting or agriculture, also is the traditional responsibility of Lenape women.

Historically, a number of social norms in Eastern Woodland communities demonstrate a balance of power held between women and men. Men and women have traditionally both had the final say over who they would end up marrying, though parents usually have a great deal of influence as well.

=== Haudenosaunee ===
The Haudenosaunee (Iroquois) creation myth holds that before the world was created, there was a floating island in the sky upon which the Sky People lived. Among them, a pregnant Sky Woman who was going to give birth to twins. Her husband was angry to find out they were expecting twins, and pushed her off of the floating island where she landed on the back of a giant turtle which eventually grew and became the continent of North America, which the Sky Woman and her children then gave human life to. This central myth, attributing the creation of the world to a woman rather than a man, is unique and informs the spiritual and philosophical importance of women within the precolonial Haudenosaunee people.

Before colonialism, the Haudenosaunee Confederacy (the Onondaga, Mohawk, Seneca, Cayuga, Oneida and Tuscarora peoples) had a matriarchal socioeconomic and familial structure. Women owned their own property and belongings, and children were considered descendants in their mother's line rather than that of the father. Following his marriage, a man would move into the woman's family home where he and his future children would become members of the woman's clan. In the case of parental separation or the death of the mother, children remained under the custody of the mother or the mother's surviving clan in the case of her death. Additionally, after marriage wives were empowered to divorce their husband by ordering him out of her household at any time, for any reason regardless of shared children or property.

In the 1600s, the Haudenosaunee women carried out what is believed to be the first feminist rebellion within the modern territory of the United States. Previously, Haudenosaunee men bore the sole responsibility of deciding when to declare war against rival nations. Haudenosaunee women, wanting a say in the declaration of war, boycotted sex and child-rearing. This was effective because women were believed to hold the secret to creating life, a greatly honored act. Additionally, since women grew and cultivated crops for their nation, the women of the Five Nations restricted warriors’ access to food and clothing needed for battle. The rebellion was effective, and henceforth Haudenosaunee women were granted the power to veto the nation's engagement in warfare.

Precolonial Haudenosaunee women also exercised a high level of bodily autonomy. Womanhood was respected as sacred, and rape and other acts of violence against women were rare in indigenous societies. Further, women had total control over if, when, and how they desired to bear children.

Women, as heads of household, also had the authority to decide whether or not their children would go to war. Mothers alone held the power to force their children to fight in a war if they felt it served the community, or to forbid their children from fighting if they disapproved of the war, further solidifying women's power in military endeavors.

Further, women controlled the economy of their respective nations through growing and distributing food and other resources. Haudenosaunee women were recognized for their agricultural contributions and creativity throughout the year in ceremonies, nearly all of which celebrated the land's fertility and crops, a primarily female domain. While Haudenosaunee did not practice land ownership in the same way as their colonial successors, the land was understood to be held by women. The Great Law of Peace of the Haudenosaunee Confederacy, formed in the fifteenth century, dictated when an Haudenosaunee woman used a patch of land either to live or for agriculture, it was respected as her property and if she were to move, another woman was free to use the land.

Additionally, women established and maintained the culture of their nations by defining the political, social, and spiritual practices. Senior Haudenosaunee women, the Clan Mothers, were also responsible for nominating and regulating male Rotiyanehson (chiefs) to ensure that they adequately fulfilled responsibilities to the nation. Further, political power was shared among all members of the respective Nation, with women holding voting power alongside men.

Haudenosaunee women and their power within their communities also inspired later post-colonial women's rights movements within the United States. The women's suffrage movement for white American women began in Seneca Falls in 1848, part of the Haudenosaunee Confederacy's traditional territory. Early leaders of the Women's suffrage movement, Elizabeth Cady Stanton and Matilda Joslyn Gage specifically cited the equal rights of Haudenosaunee women to participate in their government as inspiration for their movement. Further, they used Haudenosaunee women as an example to dispute notions that the subordination of white women was not natural nor just, and used their society to demonstrate true democracy in action.

=== Ojibwe ===
Historically, most Ojibwe cultures believe that men and women are usually suited to specific tasks. Hunting is usually a men's task, and first-kill feasts are held as an honour for hunters. The gathering of wild plants is more often a women's occupation; however, these tasks often overlapped, with men and women working on the same project but with different duties. Despite hunting itself being more commonly a male task, women also participate by building lodges, processing hides into apparel, and drying meat. In contemporary Ojibwe culture, all community members participate in this work, regardless of gender.

Wild rice (Ojibwe: manoomin) harvesting is done by all community members, though often women will knock the rice grains into the canoe while men paddle and steer the canoe through the reeds. For Ojibwe women, the wild rice harvest can be especially significant as it has traditionally been a chance to express their autonomy:

The wild rice harvest was the most visible expression of women's autonomy in Ojibwe society. Binding rice was an important economic activity for female workers, who within their communities expressed prior claims to rice and a legal right to use wild rice beds in rivers and lakes through this practice. Ojibwe ideas about property were not invested in patriarchy, as in European legal traditions. Therefore, when early travelers and settlers observed Indigenous women working, it would have involved a paradigm shift for them to appreciate that for the Ojibwe, water was a gendered space where women's ceremonial responsibility for water derives from these related legal traditions and economic practices.

— Brenda J. Child, Holding Our World Together, p. 25

While the Ojibwe continue to harvest wild rice by canoe, both men and women now take turns knocking rice grains.

Both Ojibwe men and women create beadwork and music, and maintain the traditions of storytelling and traditional medicine. In regards to clothing, Ojibwe women have historically worn hide dresses with leggings and moccasins, while men would wear leggings and breechcloths. After trading with European settlers became more frequent, the Ojibwe began to adopt characteristics of European dress.

== Hopi ==
The Hopi (in what is now the Hopi Reservation in northeastern Arizona) are traditionally both matriarchal and matrilineal, with egalitarian roles in the community, and no sense of superiority or inferiority based on sex or gender. Both women and men have traditionally participated in politics and community management, although colonization has brought patriarchal influences that have seen changes in the traditional structures and formerly higher status of women. However, even with these changes, matrilineal structures still remain, along with the central role of the mothers and grandmothers in the family, household, and clan structure.

== Kalapuya ==
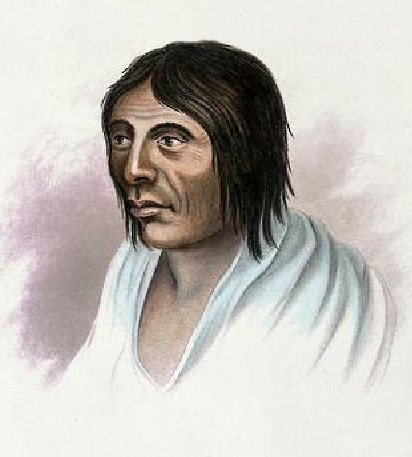
Kalapuya man of today's Willamette Valley, Oregon, USA; circa 1840, by Alfred Thomas Agate

Local leaders were generally men with the greatest wealth. Meanwhile, female leaders more commonly gained status through spiritual leadership. Kalapuya bands typically consisted of extended families of related men, their wives, and children. Ceremonial leaders could be male or female, and spiritual power was regarded as more valuable than material wealth. As such, the spiritual leaders were often more influential than the political leaders.

Kalapuya males usually hunted while the women and young children gathered food and set up camps. As the vast majority of the Kalapuya diet consisted largely of gathered food, the women supplied most of the sustenance. Women were also in charge of food preparation, preservation, and storage. The food hunted by men usually consisted of deer, elk, and fish from the rivers of the Willamette Valley, including salmon and eel. Plants gathered included wapato, tarweed seeds, hazelnuts, and especially camas. The camas bulbs were cooked by women into a cake-like bread which was considered valuable.

Women were involved in the community life and expressed their individual opinions. When a man wanted to marry a woman, he had to pay a bride price to her father. If a man slept with or raped another man's wife, he was required to pay the bride price to the husband. If he did not, he would be cut on the arm or face. If the man could pay the price, he could take the woman to be his wife.

There is a reference to gender variant people being accepted in Kalapuya culture. A Kalapuya spiritual person named Ci'mxin is recalled by John B. Hudson in his interviews from the Kalapuya Texts:

They would say "He is a man (in body), he has changed to a woman (in dress and manner of life). But he is not a woman (in body). It is his spirit-power it is said that has told him, You become woman. You are always to wear your (woman's) dress just like women. That is the way you must always do."

After the arrival of Europeans to the Willamette Valley and the creation of the Grand Ronde Reservation and boarding schools such as Chemawa Indian School, children of the Kalapuya people were taught the typical gender roles of Europeans.

== Inuit ==
=== Arvilingjuarmiut ===
The Arvilingjuarmiut, also known as Netsilik, are Inuit who live mainly in Kugaaruk and Gjoa Haven, Nunavut, Canada. They follow the tradition of kipijuituq, which refers to instances where predominantly biologically male infants are raised as females. Often the decision for an infant to become Kipijuituq is left to the grandparents based on the reactions of the infant in the womb. Children would later go on to choose their respective genders in their pubescent years once they have undergone a rite of passage that includes hunting animals. Similar in concept is sipiniq from the Igloolik and Nunavik areas.

=== Aranu’tiq ===
Aranu’tiq is a fluid category among the Chugach, an Alutiiq people from Alaska, that conforms to neither masculine nor feminine categories. Gender expression is fluid and children typically dress in a combination of both masculine and feminine clothing. Newborn babies are not regarded as new humans but rather as tarnina or inuusia which refers to their soul, personality, shade and are named after an older deceased relative as a way of reincarnation as the relationship between the child and others would go on to match those of the deceased.

== Navajo ==
Similar to other Indigenous cultures, Navajo girls participate in a rite of passage ceremony that is a celebration of the transformation into womanhood. This event is marked with new experiences and roles within the community. Described as Kinaaldá, the ritual takes place over four days, during the individual's first or second menstrual period. The reason for this is rooted deeply in Navajo supernatural beliefs and their creation myths.

The third gender role of nádleehi (meaning "one who is transformed" or "one who changes"), beyond contemporary Anglo-American definition limits of gender, is part of the Navajo Nation society, a "two-spirit" cultural role. The renowned 19th-century Navajo artist Hosteen Klah (1849–1896) is an example.

Navajo values emphasize the masculine and the feminine, despite the ritual being centered around feminine gender roles. Historically, it is recorded that Navajo cultures respected the autonomy of women and their equality to men in the tribe, in multiple spheres of life within their society. Contrarily, the primary discourse in Western society regarding girls' puberty is associated with discreteness, to be experienced privately for concern of shame and embarrassment regarding menstruation and bodily changes.

== Nez Perce ==
During the early colonial period, Nez Perce communities tended to have specific gender roles. Men were responsible for the production of equipment used for hunting, fishing, and protection of their communities, as well as the performance of these activities. Men made up the governing bodies of villages which were composed of a council and headman.

Nez Perce women in the early contact period were responsible for maintaining the household which included the production of utilitarian tools for the home. The harvest of medicinal plants was the responsibility of the women in the community due to their extensive knowledge. Edibles were harvested by both women and children. Women also regularly participated in politics, but due to their responsibilities to their families and medicine gatherings, they did not hold office. Critical knowledge regarding culture and tradition was passed down by all the elders of the community.

== Sioux ==
The Lakota, Dakota, and Nakota peoples, in addition to some other Siouan-speaking people like the Omaha and Ponca, are patriarchal or patrilineal and have historically had highly defined gender roles. In such tribes, hereditary leadership would pass through the male line, while children are considered to belong to the father and his clan. If a woman marries outside the tribe, she is no longer considered to be part of it, and her children would share the ethnicity and culture of their father. In the 19th century, the men customarily harvested wild rice whereas women harvested all other grain (among the Dakota or Santee). The winkte are a social category in Lakota culture, of male people who adopt the clothing, work, and mannerisms that Lakota culture usually considers feminine. Usually, winkte are homosexual, and sometimes the word is also used for gay men who are not in any other way gender-variant.

== See also ==
- Native Americans in the United States – Gender roles
- Indigenous feminism
- Matriarchy (the Native Americans subsection)
- Missing and murdered Indigenous women
- Native American feminism
- Native American women in politics
- Patriarchy
- Sexual victimization of Native American women
- Two-Spirit
