= Two-spirit =

Umbrella term for gender-variant Indigenous North Americans

Two-spirit pride flag

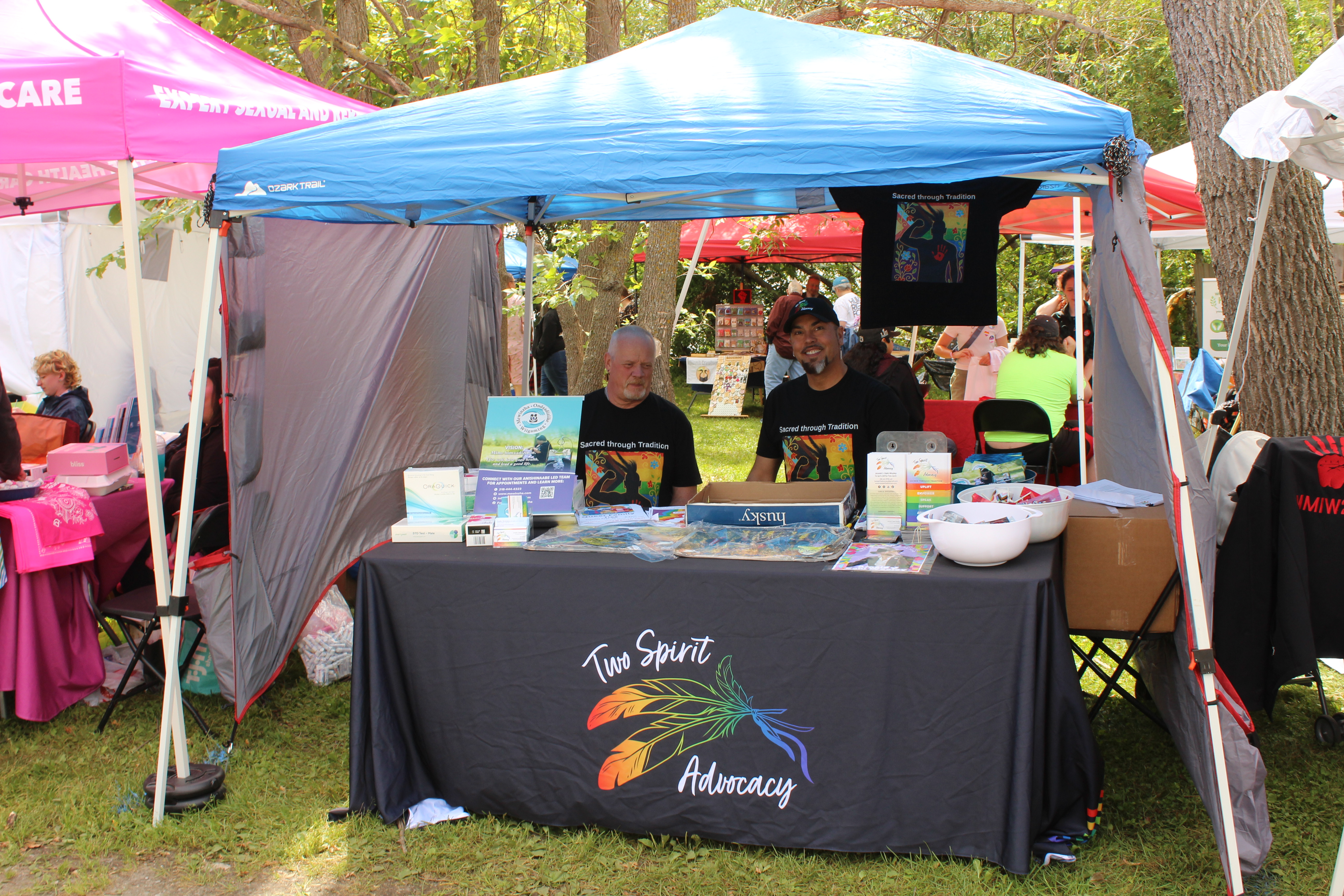
Two Spirit Advocacy booth at Bemidji Pride 2025, Bemidji, Minnesota

Two-spirit (also known as two spirit or occasionally twospirited, (Note: French: Aux deux esprits or bispirituelles) or abbreviated as 2S, (Note: French: 2E) especially in Canada) is a contemporary pan-Indian umbrella term used by some Indigenous North Americans to describe Native people who fulfill a traditional third-gender (or other gender-variant) social role in their communities.

Coined in 1990 as a primarily ceremonial term promoting community recognition, in recent years more individuals have taken to self-identifying as two-spirit. Two-spirit, as a term and concept, is neither used nor accepted universally in Native American cultures. Indigenous cultures that have traditional roles for gender-nonconforming people have names in their own Indigenous languages for these people and the roles they fill in their communities.

The initial intent in coining the term was to differentiate Indigenous concepts of gender and sexuality from those of non-Native lesbians and gays and to replace the pejorative anthropological terms that were still in wide use. Although the term "two-spirit" has been controversial since its adoption, it has experienced more academic and social acceptance than the term berdache, which it was coined to replace. The government of Canada officially uses 2SLGBTQI+ (Note: French: 2ELGBTQI+) as an alternative to the established acronym of LGBTQI+, sometimes shortened to 2SLGBT or a similar variant.

Early adopters stated that a two-spirit identity does not make sense outside of a Native American or First Nations cultural framework and its use by non-Natives is seen as a form of cultural appropriation.

The gender-nonconforming or third-gender ceremonial roles traditionally embodied by some Native American and Indigenous peoples in Canada that may be encompassed by modern two-spirit people vary widely, even among the Native individuals or cultures that use the term. Not all of these cultures have historically had roles for gender-variant people, and among those that do, no one Indigenous culture's gender or sexuality categories apply to all Native people.

== Two-spirit as a term ==
=== Etymology ===
The neologism two-spirit was adopted in 1990 at the Third Annual Inter-tribal Native American, First Nations, Gay and Lesbian American Conference, held near Winnipeg. Credit for developing the term is usually given to several participants in the gatherings. The term was first developed and proposed in English, and later the Ojibwe translation niizh manidoowag was constructed and proposed to honor the language of the Indigenous peoples in whose territory the conference was being held.

Both the English and Ojibwe terms were coined at the 1990 conference, and are not found in the historical record. Two-spirit, in English or translated into any other language, is a general term for wider audiences, and is not intended to replace the traditional terms or concepts already in use in Indigenous cultures.

For early adopters, the term two spirit was a deliberate act to differentiate and distance themselves from non-Native gays and lesbians, as well as from non-Native terminology such as gay, lesbian, and transgender. Particularly offensive was the term berdache, which had previously been the preferred term among non-Native anthropologists to refer to Indigenous people who did not conform to standard European-American gender roles. Berdache, which means "passive partner in sodomy, boy prostitute", is considered offensive by many. Journalist Mary Annette Pember (Red Cliff Ojibwe) and others have written that conference participants were motivated by the desire to coin a new term that could take the place of the outdated and offensive anthropological term.

Two-spirited woman Michelle Cameron (Carrier First Nations) writes, "The term two-spirit is thus an Aboriginal-specific term of resistance to colonization and non-transferable to other cultures. There are several underlying reasons for two-spirited Aboriginals' desire to distance themselves from the mainstream queer community." German anthropologist Sabine Lang writes that for Aboriginal people, sexual orientation or gender identity is secondary to their ethnic identity. "At the core of contemporary two-spirit identities is ethnicity, an awareness of being Native American as opposed to being white or being a member of any other ethnic group".

While initially focused on ceremonial and social roles within the Indigenous community, as a pan-Indian, English-language umbrella term, for some it has come to have similar use as the terms queer (modern, reclaimed usage) or LGBTQ in encompassing lesbian, gay, bisexual, and transgender Native peoples in North America.

==== Disputed origins ====
Primary attribution of the term two spirit, since 1990, has been ascribed to Albert McLeod (Nisichawayasihk Cree), who also acknowledges the input of those who participated in the series of five conferences that culminated in the discussions at the Third Annual Inter-tribal Native American, First Nations, Gay and Lesbian American Conference in 1990. In 2021, Myra Laramee (Fisher River Cree) reported that she proposed the term at the 1990 gathering after the phrase came to her in a dream.

Journalist Mary Annette Pember (Red Cliff Ojibwe) notes that "Non-Native anthropologist Will Roscoe gets much of the public credit for coining the term two spirit. However, according to Kristopher Kohl Miner of the Ho-Chunk Nation, Native people such as anthropologist Wesley Thomas of the Dine or Navajo tribe also contributed to its creation. (Thomas is a professor in the School of Dine and Law Studies.)". Roscoe, like his non-Native mentor Harry Hay, was involved in the gay hippie group Radical Faeries, a non-Native community that emulated Native spirituality and engaged in other forms of cultural appropriation.

=== Criticism of the term ===
Criticism of "two-spirit" centers on the term's Western origins, interpretations and influence, the lack of emphasis on Indigenous cultural traditions as maintained by tribal elders, and the potential to render tribal traditions indistinct or vanish them completely.

The terms used by tribes who have roles for gender-variant persons, both currently and historically, do not translate into any form of 'two spirit', and the Ojibwe form niizh manidoowag is also modern – a new translation from English that was chosen in 1990, after the term was coined in English. In fact, some Indigenous communities or tribes have their own specific terms for third-gender or non-binary gender roles.

With 575 federally recognized tribes in the United States alone, some critics say use of the term two-spirit risks erasing traditional terms specific to different, unique communities, that already have their own terminology for these individuals in their Indigenous languages (if they have them — not all cultures do). Since historically, those recorded as gender-variant individuals are often mentioned in the context of having held spiritual, ceremonial roles, the term two spirit – which may have nothing to do with those beliefs and ceremonies – can create a disconnection from, and forgetting of, the actual cultural beliefs and ceremonies.

At the series of conferences where the term was gradually adopted (1990 being the third of five), some Native attendees expressed concern that reservation communities would scorn the idea of two-spirit and never adopt the term.

Additional issues with two-spirit that others have voiced is that they see it as a capitulation to urbanization and loss of culture that, while initially intended to help people reconnect with the spiritual dimension of these roles, was not working out the way it had been intended. In 2009, writing for the Encyclopedia of Gender and Society, Kylan Mattias de Vries wrote:

With the urbanization and assimilation of Native peoples, individuals began utilizing Western terms, concepts, and identities, such as gay, lesbian, transgender, and intersex. These terms separated Native cultural identity from sexuality and gender identity, furthering a disconnect felt by many Native American/First Nations peoples in negotiating the boundaries of life between two worlds (Native and non-Native/Western). The term two-spirited was created to reconnect one's gender or sexual identity with her or his Native identity and culture. ... Some Native Americans/First Nations people that hold to more traditional religious and cultural values view two-spirit as a cultural and social term, rather than one with any religious or spiritual meaning. ... Since historically, many "berdache/two-spirit" individuals held religious or spiritual roles, the term two spirit creates a disconnection from the past. The terms used by other tribes currently and historically do not translate directly into the English form of two spirit or the Ojibwe form of niizh manidoowag.

==== Perception of Western gender binary ====
The binary nature of two-spirit, or the idea of having two spirits in one body, is not a theme found in the traditional gender roles for Native people, and concerns about this misrepresentation have been voiced since the 1990 conference where the term was adopted. Traditional Native Americans asked about the concept rejected the "Western" gender binary implications of the term "Two Spirit", such as implying that Natives believe these individuals are "both male and female".

Writing on possible misinterpretations from English speakers who hold binary gender views, Kylan Mattias de Vries says in Encyclopedia of Gender and Society: Volume 1 (2009), an academic textbook:

It implies that the individual is both male and female and that these aspects are intertwined within them. The term moves away from traditional Native American/First Nations cultural identities and meanings of sexuality and gender variance. It does not take into account the terms and meanings from individual nations and tribes. ... Although two-spirit implies to some a spiritual nature, that one holds the spirit of two, both male and female, traditional Native Americans/First Nations peoples view this as a Western concept.

== Traditional Indigenous terms ==
While some have found two-spirit a useful tool for intertribal organizing, "the concept and word two-spirit has no traditional cultural significance". Not all tribes have ceremonial roles for these people, and the tribes that do usually use names in their own languages.

With over 500 surviving Native American cultures, attitudes about sex and gender can be diverse. Even with the modern adoption of pan-Indian terms like two-spirit, and the creation of a modern pan-Indian community around this naming, not all cultures will perceive gender-nonconforming members of their communities the same way, or welcome a pan-Indian term to replace the terms already in use by their cultures. Additionally, not all contemporary Indigenous communities are supportive of their gender-variant and non-heterosexual people now. In these communities, those looking for two-spirit community have sometimes faced oppression and rejection. While existing terminology in many nations shows historical acknowledgement of differing sexual orientations and gender expressions, members of some of these nations have also said that while variance was accepted, they never had separate or defined roles for these members of the community. Among the Indigenous communities that traditionally have roles for two-spirit people, specific terms in their own languages are used for the social and spiritual roles these individuals fulfill. The following list is not comprehensive.

Language	Term	Literal translation	Description
Aleut	tayagigux'	"Woman transformed into a man"	
Aleut	ayagigux'	"Man transformed into a woman"	
Blackfoot	ninauh-oskitsi-pahpyaki	"Manly-hearted-woman"	This term has a wide variety of meanings ranging from women who performed the roles of men, dressed as men, took female partners, or who participated in activities such as war.
Blackfoot	ááwowáakii	"A male homosexual"	
Blackfoot	a'yai-kik-ahsi	"Acts like a woman"	There are historical accounts of individuals who engaged in homosexual relationships, or who were born as men but lived their lives as women, possibly for religious or social reasons. These individuals were viewed in a wide variety of ways, from being revered spiritual leaders, brave warriors and artisans, to targets of ridicule.
Cheyenne	heemaneh		A cross-gender or third-gender person, typically a male-bodied person who takes on the roles and duties of a woman. Heemaneh have had specialized roles within Cheyenne society, including officiating during the Scalp Dance, organizing marriages, acting as messengers between lovers, and accompanying men to war.
Cree	ᐃᐢᑵᐤ ᑲ ᓇᐯᐘᔭᐟ, iskwêw ka-napêwayat	"A woman who dresses as a man"	
Cree	ᓇᐯᐤ ᐃᐢᑵᐏᓭᐦᐅᐟ, napêw iskwêwisêhot	"A man who dresses as a woman"	
Cree	ᐄᓇᐦᐲᑲᓱᐦᐟ, înahpîkasoht	"A woman dressed/living/accepted as a man" or "someone who fights everyone to prove they are the toughest"	
Cree	ᐊᔭᐦᑵᐤ, ayahkwêw	"A man dressed/living/accepted as a woman"	Possibly not a respectful term. Others have suggested it is a third-gender designation, applied to both male-bodied and female-bodied people.
Cree	ᓈᐯᐦᑳᐣ, napêhkân	"One who acts/lives as a man"	
Cree	ᐃᐢᑵᐦᑳᐣ, iskwêhkân	"One who acts/lives as a woman"	
Crow	batée		A word that describes both trans women and homosexual males.
Klamath	t’winiːq		A word describing both male-bodied and female-bodied people outside of their respective Klamath gender norms, usually accepted by the community, but living "outside respectable Klamath society".
Klamath	Ämmä’ri	“neatly dressed”	Unique subject pronoun used by healer Muksamse’lapli in the 1890s, usage by others unknown.
Lakota	wíŋkte	"wants to be like a woman"	Male-bodied people who in some cases have adopted the clothing, work, and mannerisms usually considered feminine in Lakota culture. In contemporary Lakota culture, the term is most commonly associated with simply being gay. Both historically and in modern culture, usually winkte are homosexual. Most historical accounts, notably those by other Lakota, see the winkte as regular members of the community, and neither marginalized for their status, nor seen as exceptional. Other writings, usually historical accounts by anthropologists, hold the winkte as sacred, occupying a liminal, third gender role and fulfilling ceremonial roles that can not be filled by either men or women. In contemporary Lakota communities, attitudes towards the winkte vary from accepting to homophobic.
Navajo	nádleehi or nádleeh	"One who is transformed" or "one who changes"	In traditional Navajo culture, nádleeh are male-bodied individuals described by those in their communities as "effeminate male", or as "half woman, half man". A 2009 documentary about the tragic murder of nádleeh Fred Martinez, entitled, Two Spirits, contributed to awareness of these terms and cultures. A Navajo gender spectrum that has been described is that of four genders: feminine woman, masculine woman, feminine man, masculine man.
Ojibwe	ininiikaazo	"Women who functioned as men" or "one who endeavors to be like a man"	According to academic Anton Treuer, sex, gender, and work were often related in Ojibwe culture, but variation was accepted. Ikwekaazo (men who functioned as women) and ininiikaazo (women who functioned as men) lived and worked as their gender, not their sex, and could take spouses of their own sex. Both ikwekaazo and ininiikaazo were considered spiritually strong and honored ceremonially.
Ojibwe	ikwekaazo	"Men who chose to function as women" / "one who endeavors to be like a woman".	According to academic Anton Treuer, sex, gender, and work were often related in Ojibwe culture, but variation was accepted. Ikwekaazo (men who functioned as women) and ininiikaazo (women who functioned as men) lived and worked as their gender, not their sex, and could take spouses of their own sex. Both ikwekaazo and ininiikaazo were considered spiritually strong and honored ceremonially.
Ojibwe	agokwe or agokwa	"man-woman"	Male-assigned. The Ojibwe word agokwe was used by John Tanner to describe gender-nonconforming Ojibwe warrior Ozaawindib (fl. 1797–1832).
Ojibwe	Okitcitakwe	"warrior woman"	Female-assigned
Warao	tida wena	"twisted women"	
Zuni	lhamana		Men who at times may also take on the social and ceremonial roles performed by women in their culture. Accounts from the 1800s note that lhamana, while dressed in "female attire", were often hired for work that required "strength and endurance", while also excelling in traditional arts and crafts such as pottery and weaving. Notable lhamana We'wha (1849–1896), lived in both traditional female and male social and ceremonial roles at various points in their life, and was a respected community leader and cultural ambassador.

== Indigiqueer ==
Another contemporary term in use, as an alternative to two-spirit, and which does not rely on binary conceptions of gender, is Indigiqueer. Originally spelled Indigequeer, the term was coined by TJ Cuthand, and popularized by author Joshua Whitehead. Cuthand first used Indigiqueer for the title of the 2004 Vancouver Queer Film Festival's Indigenous/two-spirit Program, and has written that he came up with this alternative term, "because some LGBTQ Indigenous people don't feel as comfortable with the two-spirit title because it implies some dual gender stuff, which some people just don't feel describes their identity."

== Cultural issues and protocols ==
=== Definition and societal role in Indigenous communities ===
Though "two-spirit" has gained far more mainstream recognition and popularity than the traditional terms in Indigenous languages, acceptance of the term is not universal. While use of "two-spirit" to replace the offensive berdache proceeded, particularly in academic practice, the word has sometimes replaced culturally-specific terms and their attendant Indigenous knowledge, leading to criticism about its potential to dilute or erase culture. Writing for Encyclopedia of Gender and Society: Volume 1 (2009), an academic textbook, Kylan Mattias de Vries says: "Nations and tribes used various words to describe various genders, sexes and sexualities. Many had separate words for the Western constructs of gays, lesbians, bisexuals, intersex individuals, cross-dressers, transgender individuals, gender-variant individuals, or 'changing ones', third genders (men who live as women), and fourth genders (women who live as men). Even these categories are limiting, because they are based on Western language and ideas rooted in a dichotomous relationship between gender, sex, and sexuality. This language barrier limits our understanding of the traditional roles within Native American/First Nations cultures."

Male-bodied two-spirit people, regardless of gender identification, can go to war and have access to male activities such as male-only sweat lodge ceremonies. However, they may also take on "feminine" activities such as cooking and other domestic responsibilities. According to Lang, female-bodied two-spirit people usually have sexual relations or marriages with only females.

For First Nations people whose lives have been impacted by the residential schools, and other Indigenous communities who have experienced severe cultural damage from colonization, the specific traditions in their communities that might now be seen as two-spirit may have been severely damaged, fragmented, or even lost. While not all communities had these ways, in those that did, for some there may be challenges in reviving older traditions, and to overcoming learned homophobia or other prejudices that may have been introduced with colonization.

=== Given title and role ===
Traditional Native American cultures that have ceremonial roles for gender-variant members of their communities may require that these people be recognized and assigned this role by tribal elders. In these cultures, a traditional third-gender ceremonial or social role is a given title that cannot be self-selected. For these communities, two-spirit differs from the mainstream Western use of sexual and gender identity labels because it is a sacred, spiritual and ceremonial role that is recognized and confirmed only by tribal elders of that two-spirit person's Indigenous ceremonial community. In these tribes, two-spirit people have specific duties, and the two-spirit title is not granted unless the person is fulfilling these ceremonial roles.

Talking to The New York Times in 2006, Joey Criddle, who is part Jicarilla Apache, says that two-spirit titles are not interchangeable with "LGBT Native American" or "gay Indian": "The elders will tell you the difference between a gay Indian and a Two-Spirit." He underscores that simply being gay and Native does not make someone a two-spirit, which requires participation in tribal ceremony.

=== Appropriation ===
The increasing visibility of the two-spirit concept in mainstream culture has been seen as both empowering and as having some undesirable consequences, such as the spread of misinformation about the cultures of Indigenous peoples, pan-Indianism replacing culturally-specific teachings and traditions, and cultural appropriation of Indigenous identities and ceremonial ways by non-Natives who do not understand that Indigenous communities see two-spirit as a specifically Native American and First Nations cultural identity, not one to be taken up by non-Natives.

These sort of simplified black-and-white depictions of Native culture and history perpetuate indiscriminate appropriation of Native peoples. Although the current new meme or legend surrounding the term two spirit is certainly laudable for helping LGBTQ people create their own more empowering terminology to describe themselves, it carries some questionable baggage. My concern is not so much over the use of the words but over the social meme they have generated that has morphed into a cocktail of historical revisionism, wishful thinking, good intentions, and a soupçon of white, entitled appropriation.

Two-spirit does not acknowledge either the traditional acceptance or the nonacceptance of individuals in various nations and tribes. The idea of gender and sexuality variance being universally accepted among Native American/First Nations peoples has become romanticized.
Accordingly, the change from berdache to two-spirit is most accurately understood as a non-Native idealization of the social acceptance of gender variance, idealizing a romanticized acceptance of gender variance.

When Indigenous people from communities that are less-accepting of two-spirits have sought community among non-Native LGBTQ communities, however, the tendency for non-Natives to tokenize and appropriate has at times led to rifts rather than unity, with two-spirits feeling like they are just another tacked on initial rather than fully included. Cameron writes:

The term two-spirited was chosen to emphasize our difference in our experiences of multiple, interlocking oppressions as queer Aboriginal people. When non-Aboriginal people decide to "take up" the term two-spirit, it detracts from its original meaning and diffuses its power as a label of resistance for Aboriginal people. Already there is so much of First Nations culture that has been exploited and appropriated in this country; must our terms of resistance also be targeted for mainstream appropriation and consumption? Two-spirited is a reclaimed term designed by Aboriginals to define our unique cultural context, histories, and legacy. When people do not see the harm in "sharing" the term, they are missing the point and refusing to recognize that by appropriating the term they will inevitably alter its cultural context.

In academia, there has since 2010 or earlier been a move to "queer the analytics of settler colonialism" and create a "twospirit" critique as part of the general field of queer studies. However, much of this academic analysis and publishing is not based in traditional Indigenous knowledge, but in the more mainstream, non-Native perspectives of the broader LGBTQ communities, so most of the same cultural misunderstandings tend to be found as in the outdated writing of the non-Native anthropologists and "explorers".

== Two-spirit societies ==
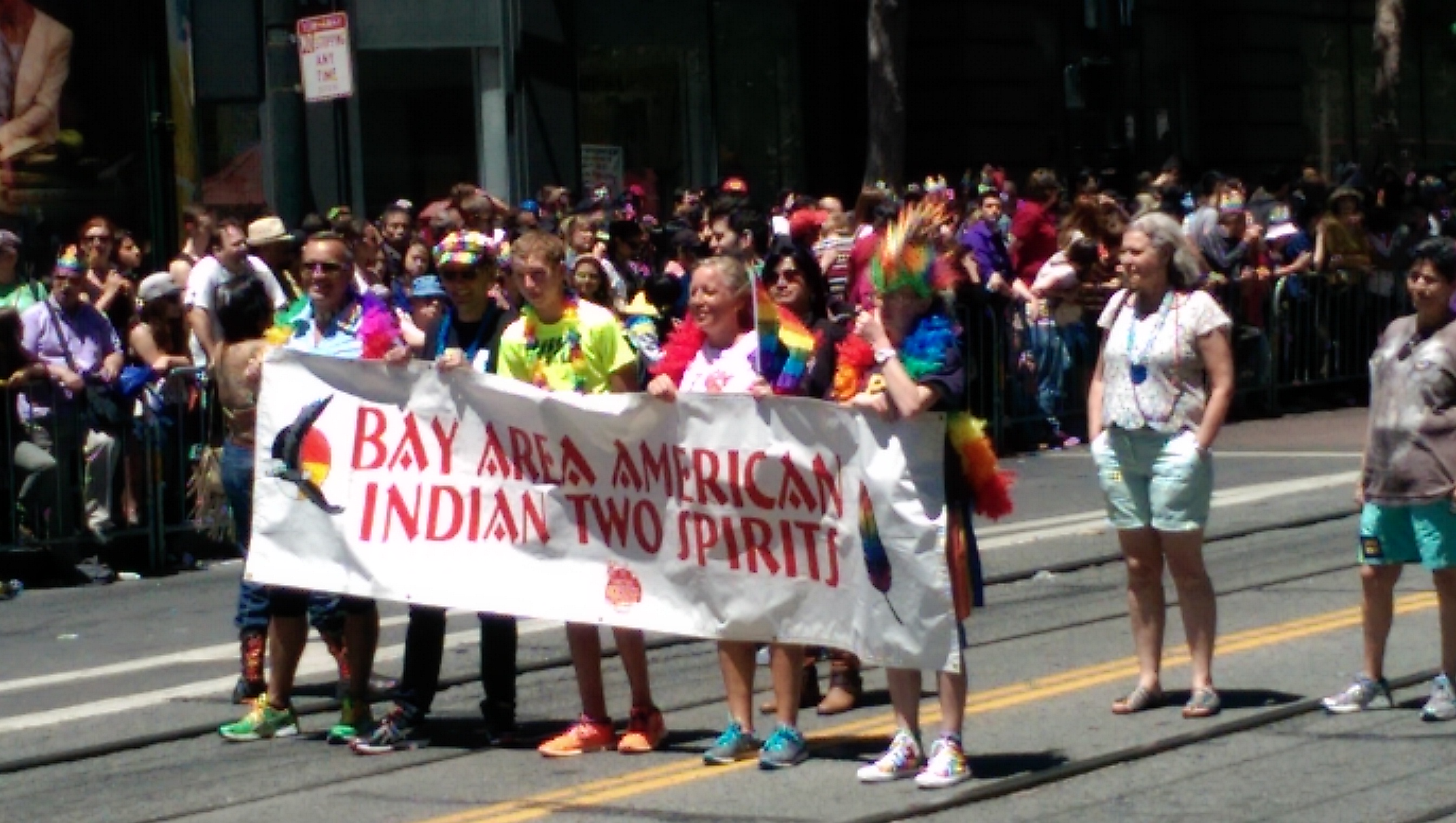
The two-spirit contingent marches at San Francisco Pride 2014

Among the goals of two-spirit societies are group support; outreach, education, and activism; revival of their Indigenous cultural traditions, including preserving the old languages, skills and dances; and otherwise working toward social change.

Some two-spirit societies (past and present) include: 2Spirits of Toronto in Toronto, Ontario; the Wabanaki Two Spirit Alliance in Nova Scotia; the Bay Area American Indian Two-Spirits (est. 1998) in San Francisco, California; Central Oklahoma Two Spirit Natives in Oklahoma City; the East Coast Two Spirit Society and the NorthEast Two-Spirit Society in New York City; Idaho Two-Spirit Society; the Indiana Two-Spirit Society in Bloomington; Minnesota Two Spirits; the Montana Two-Spirit Society in Browning; the Northwest Two-Spirit Society in Seattle, Washington; the Ohio Valley Two Spirit Society of Ohio, Indiana, Kentucky, and Southern Illinois; the Portland Two Spirit Society (est. May 2012) in Portland, Oregon; the Regina Two-Spirited Society in Regina, Saskatchewan; the Texas Two Spirit Society in Dallas; the Tulsa Two-Spirit Society in Tulsa, Oklahoma; the Two-Spirit Society of Denver in Denver, Colorado; and the Wichita Two-Spirit Society in Wichita, Kansas.

== Academic use of umbrella terms ==
Writing in March 1998 to advise colleagues and peers in the anthropology profession on the accurate and respectful use of language for Native American subjects in anthropological research and archaeological projects, Alice Beck Kehoe, a non-Native Professor Emeritus at Marquette University who attended the Annual Inter-tribal Native American, First Nations, Gay and Lesbian American Conferences, recounts her observations of the discussions that resulted in the term two-spirit at the 1990 conference: "At the conferences that produced the book, Two-Spirited People, I heard several First Nations people describe themselves as very much unitary, neither 'male' nor 'female', much less a pair in one body. Nor did they report an assumption of duality within one body as a common concept within reservation communities; rather, people confided dismay at the Western proclivity for dichotomies."

Kehoe cautions that modern identity umbrella terms such as two-spirit can't be relied upon for accurate and respectful historical scholarship because they are too general and are produced out of modern contexts that their subjects do not come from. She additionally recommended against folding Native and two-spirit gender and sexual identities under the "Indo-European tag 'third gender'", as this could obscure the diversity within and among Native societies with relation to gender and sexual identities. She concluded that the best course of action for anthropological professionals when generating language around historical Native artefacts, remains, or societies is to consult with native speakers and to use the terminology within Native peoples' own languages.

== Historical and anthropological accounts ==
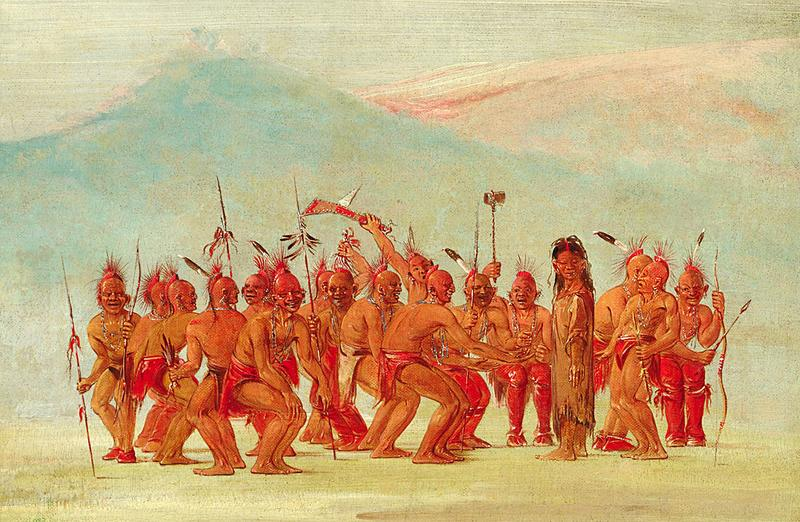
Drawing by George Catlin (1796–1872) while on the Great Plains among the Sac and Fox Nation. Depicting a group of male warriors dancing around a male-bodied person in a woman's dress, non-Native artist George Catlin titled the painting Dance to the Berdach.

Unfortunately, depending on an oral tradition to impart our ways to future generations opened the floodgates for early non-Native explorers, missionaries, and anthropologists to write books describing Native peoples and therefore bolstering their own role as experts. These writings were and still are entrenched in the perspective of the authors who were and are mostly white men. ~ Mary Annette Pember (Red Cliff Ojibwe)

According to German anthropologist Sabine Lang, cross-dressing of two-spirit people was not always an indicator of gender identity. Lang believes "the mere fact that a male wears women's clothing does not say anything about his role behavior, his gender status, or even his choice of partner". Other anthropologists may have mistakenly labelled some Native individuals two-spirit or berdache because of a lack of cultural understanding, specifically around an Indigenous community's worldview, and their particular customs concerning clothing and gender.

According to non-Natives including author Brian Gilley and anthropologist Will Roscoe, the historical presence of male-bodied two-spirits "was a fundamental institution among most tribal peoples", with both male- and female-bodied two-spirits having been documented "in over 130 North American tribes, in every region of the continent". However, Ojibwe journalist Mary Annette Pember argues that this depiction threatens to homogenize diverse Indigenous cultures, painting over them with an excessively broad brush, potentially causing the disappearance of "distinct cultural and language differences that Native peoples hold crucial to their identity".

Don Pedro Fages was second in command on land of the 1769–70 Spanish Portolá expedition, the first European land exploration of what is now the U.S. state of California. At least three diaries were kept during the expedition, but Fages wrote his account later, in 1775. Fages gave more descriptive details about the native Californians than any of the others, and he alone reported the presence of homosexuality in the native culture. The English translation reads:

I have substantial evidence that those Indian men who, both here and farther inland, are observed in the dress, clothing and character of women – there being two or three such in each village – pass as sodomites by profession. ... They are called joyas, and are held in great esteem.

Although gender-variant people have been both respected and feared in a number of tribes, they are not beyond being reproached or, by traditional law, even killed for bad deeds. In the Mojave tribe, for instance, they frequently become medicine persons and, like all who deal with the supernatural, are at risk of suspicion of witchcraft, notably in cases of failed harvest or of death. There have been instances of murder in these cases (such as in the case of the gender-nonconforming female named Sahaykwisā). Another instance in the late 1840s was of a Crow badé who was caught, possibly raiding horses, by the Lakota and was killed.

Lang and Jacobs write that historically among the Apache, the Lipan, Chiricahua, Mescalero, and southern Dilzhe'e have alternative gender identities. One tribe in particular, the Eyak, has a single report from 1938 that they did not have an alternative gender and they held such individuals in low esteem, although whether this sentiment is the result of acculturation or not is unknown.

Among the Iroquois, there is a single report from Bacqueville de la Potherie in his book published in 1722, Histoire de l'Amérique septentrionale, that indicates that an alternative gender identity exists among them.

Many, if not all, Indigenous cultures have been affected by European homophobia and misogyny. Some sources have reported that the Aztecs and Incas had laws against such individuals, though there are some authors who feel that this was exaggerated or the result of acculturation, because all of the documents indicating this are post-conquest and any that existed before had been destroyed by the Spanish. The belief that these laws existed, at least for the Aztecs, comes from the Florentine Codex. Evidence exists that Indigenous peoples produced many codices, but the Spaniards destroyed most of them in their attempt to eradicate ancient beliefs.

Some contemporary Zapotec peoples in Mexico embody the traditional third gender role known as muxe. They consider themselves to be "muxe in men's bodies", who do the work that their culture usually associates with women. When asked by an Austrian researcher in 2004 if they ever considered surgical transition, "none of the respondents found the idea interesting, but rather strange" as their essence as muxe is not dependent on what type of body they are in.

=== Berdache ===
Before the late twentieth century, non-Native (i.e. non-Native American/Canadian) anthropologists used the term berdache (/bərˈdæʃ/ bər-DASH), in a very broad manner, to identify an Indigenous individual fulfilling one of many mixed gender roles in their tribe. Most often these anthropologists applied the term to any male whom they perceived to be homosexual, bisexual, or effeminate by Western social standards, though occasionally the term was applied to lesbian, bisexual and gender nonconforming females as well. This led to a wide variety of diverse individuals being categorized under this imprecise term. At times they incorrectly implied that these individuals were intersex (or, "hermaphrodites").

The term berdache is considered offensive by many. De Vries writes, "Berdache is a derogatory term created by Europeans and perpetuated by anthropologists and others to define Native American/First Nations people who varied from Western norms that perceive gender, sex, and sexuality as binaries and inseparable." The term has now fallen out of favor with anthropologists as well. It derives from the French bardache (English equivalent: "bardash") meaning "passive homosexual", "catamite" or even "boy prostitute". Bardache, in turn, derived from the Persian برده barda meaning "captive", "prisoner of war", "slave". Spanish explorers who encountered these individuals among the Chumash people called them "joyas", the Spanish for "jewels".

Use of berdache has now been replaced in most mainstream and anthropological literature by two spirit, with mixed results. However, the term two spirit itself, in English or any other language, was not in use before 1990.

== Media representation ==
=== Speculative fiction ===
Two-Spirit speculative fiction is a genre that explores gender identity and cultural perspectives through Indigenous traditions and futuristic or alternate realities, sometimes empowering and inspiring readers. The genre offers Indigenous authors and readers a chance to express, reclaim, and reshape their narratives while questioning conventional views on gender and culture through fictional stories. The emergence of Two-Spirit speculative fiction can be understood in the context of queer literature's broader landscape. This includes its efforts to challenge heteronormative narratives and enhance representation within the LGBTQ+ community. Two-Spirit authors use their writing to assert their independence from settler counter-parts and envision a better future for themselves and their communities. Such works are also characterized by a sense of optimism and hope for the future, contrasting with the dark history of Indigenous peoples in the Americas, marked by destruction and genocide.

It is also characterized by its ability to challenge existing power structures and norms, as well as to envision and create new possibilities for gender and cultural identities. Prominent authors include Daniel Heath Justice and Itai Jeffries, while speculative fiction works by two-spirit fiction authors have been collected in anthologies like Love Beyond Body, Space, and Time and Sovereign Erotics: A Collection of Two-Spirit Literature.

=== Film ===
In the 1970 film Little Big Man, the Cheyenne character Little Horse, portrayed by Robert Little Star, is a gay man who wears clothing more commonly worn by women in the culture. He invites the protagonist, Jack Crabb (Dustin Hoffman) to come live with him. In a departure from most portrayals in Westerns of the era, Crabb is touched and flattered by the offer. However, this depiction of Little Horse for Two-Spirit Folk is connected to negative stereotypical representation and furthers the narrative that Two-Spirit Folk are something to be laughed at.

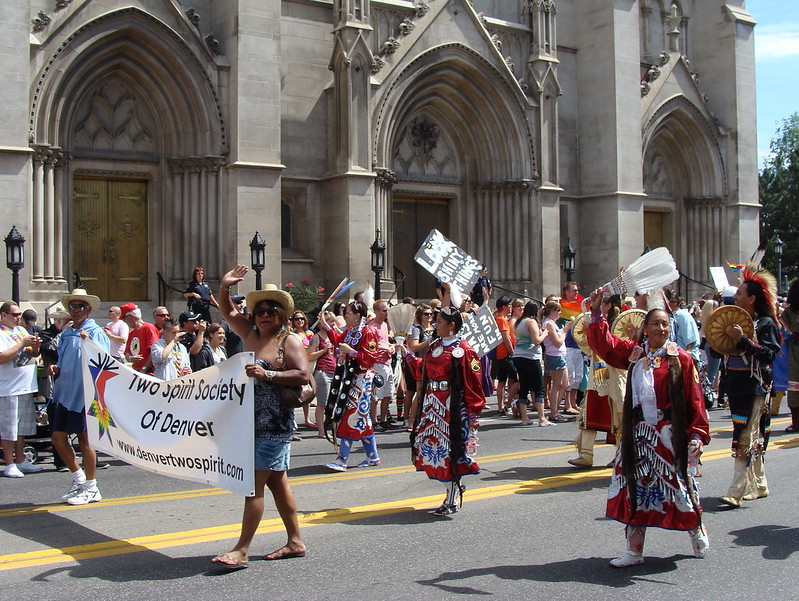
Two Spirit Rally, Denver, Colorado, 2011

The 2009 documentary film Two Spirits, directed by Lydia Nibley, tells the story of the hate-murder of 16-year-old Navajo Fred Martinez. The film was shown on Independent Lens in 2011, and was the winner of the annual Audience Award for that year. In the film, Nibley "affirms Martinez' Navajo sense of being a two spirit 'effeminate male', or nádleeh". Martinez' mother defined nádleeh as "half woman, half man".

Fire Song, a 2015 film directed by Adam Garnet Jones follows a gay Anishnabe teenager in Northern Ontario who is struggling to support his family in the aftermath of his sister's suicide.

In 2017 two-spirited Metis filmmaker Marjorie Beaucage released Coming In Stories: Two Spirit in Saskatchewan as a way to raise awareness about the experiences of two-spirited individuals living in Saskatchewan, Canada.

In the 2018 indie film, The Miseducation of Cameron Post, a Lakota character – Adam Red Eagle, played by Forrest Goodluck – is sent to a conversion camp for identifying as winkte and two-spirit.

The 2021 film Wildhood directed by Bretten Hannam, follows the storyline of Link and his brother Travis (Avery Winters-Anthony) who are fleeing their abusive father. During this journey Link (Phillip Lewitski) discovers his sexuality as a Two-Spirit person and rediscovers his Mi'kmaw heritage.

Premiering at the Sundance Film Festival, the 2023 film Fancy Dance by Erica Tremblay, a Seneca–Cayuga Nation writer and director, is about the crisis of Missing and Murdered Indigenous Women through the disappearance of her sister Tawi (Hauli Gray); the film follows the story of Jax (Lily Gladstone), a butch lesbian living on the Seneca-Cayuga Nation reservation in Oklahoma, and her niece Roki (Isabel DeRoy-Olson).

=== Television ===
In the 2019, second season of American Gods, Devery Jacobs (Mohawk) plays a young Cherokee woman, Sam Black Crow, who self-identifies as "two-spirited" (although in the book, she is mentioned in passing as being bisexual). Her character, raised by a white mother and estranged from her Native father, speaks of looking to older ancestors to try to find her own beliefs, much like the other humans in the series. In an interview Jacobs says, "I identify as queer, and not two-spirited, because I'm Mohawk and we don't have that" and that Neil Gaiman (author of the novels on which the series is based) advocated strongly for her to be cast in the role.

Lovecraft Country, a 2020 HBO television series, features Yahima, an Arawak two-spirit character. Showrunner Misha Green addressed the fate of this character by tweeting "I wanted to show the uncomfortable truth that oppressed folks can also be oppressors. It's a story point worth making, but I failed in the way I chose to make it." The term two-spirit is used anachronistically in the series, being set in the 1950s whilst the term itself was coined in 1990.

RuPaul's Drag Race and Canadas Drag Race both have had various Two-Spirit and Indigiqueer Drag Queens compete. Two-Spirit Drag Queen Anita LandBack, a Mi'kmaw nurse practitioner by day competed on Season Four of Canadas Drag Race, and on Season Five two self-identified Two-Spirit Drag Queens, Jaylene Tyme who is Zagime Anishinabek with ties to Métis Nation Saskatchewan and Xana who is Métis, competed.

=== Books ===
The 2024 graphic novel The Ribbon Skirt is about an Ojibwe two-spirit tween, written by two-spirit author Cameron Mukwa.

=== Social media ===
Through the #Two-Spirit on TikTok scholar Francesca Marino has argued that the representation from the hashtag allows for content creators to have a contrastive, pedagogical, and metamorphic meaning of Two-Spirit. This practice of using the hashtag on TikTok can then be seen as embodying practices that are seen as particularly relevant in disrupting colonial heteropatriarchy.

=== Tributes ===
In 2012, a marker dedicated to two spirit people was included in the Legacy Walk, an outdoor public display in Chicago, Illinois, that celebrates LGBTQ history and people.

== Self-identified Two-Spirit Folk ==
"Self-identified" here is meant as a contrast to the way a traditional two spirit must be recognized as such by the elders of their Indigenous community when the term is used as a synonym for a traditional ceremonial role (for which there will be an already-existing term in that culture's Indigenous language). Inclusion in this list is thus not an indication of whether the person is recognized or not.

- Susan Allen (Rosebud Lakota), Minnesota State Representative
- Shawna Baker (Cherokee Nation) Justice of the Cherokee Nation Supreme Court
- Yolanda Bonnell (Fort William Ojibwe), Canadian actress and playwright
- Lori Campbell (Montreal Lake Cree-Métis), educator and politician.
- Big Wind Carpenter (Northern Arapaho), environmental and indigenous activist
- Raven Davis (Ojibwa), artist, activist, and traditional cultural worker
- Blake Desjarlais (Cree/Metis), Canada's first two-spirit Member of Parliament. Elected in the 2021 Canadian federal election in the Edmonton Griesbach riding as a member of the New Democratic Party.
- Jeremy Dutcher (Tobique Wolastoqiyik), tenor, composer, musicologist, performer and activist
- Bretten Hannam (Mi'kmaq/Ojibwe), filmmaker
- Shawnee Kish (Grand River Mohawk), musician
- Richard LaFortune (Orutsararmiut Yupik), activist, author and artist
- James Makokis (Saddle Lake Cree), physician
- Kent Monkman (Fisher River Cree), visual and performing artist
- Rebecca Nagle (Cherokee Nation), activist and writer
- Harlan Pruden (Beaver Lake Cree), scholar and activist
- Smokii Sumac (Ktunaxa), poet and activist
- Arielle Twist (George Gordon Cree), poet
- Ilona Verley (Nlakaʼpamux), drag queen, contestant on Canada's Drag Race
- Storme Webber (Alutiiq), interdisciplinary artist
- Delina White (Leech Lake Ojibwe), activist, artist, clothing designer
- Joshua Whitehead (Peguis Oji-Cree), poet and novelist
- Massey Whiteknife (Mikisew Cree), businessman, producer and entertainer
- We'wha (Zuni, c. 1849–1896), weaver

== See also ==
- Gay American Indians
- Gender roles among the Indigenous peoples of North America
- Koekchuch
- Māhū, those "in the middle", between the polar genders, in some Pacific Islander Indigenous communities
- Native American identity in the United States
- Osh-Tisch
- Sipiniq, a third gender identity among the Inuit
