= Wide-Open Desert =

2023 non-fiction book by Jordan Biro Walters

Wide-Open Desert: A Queer History of New Mexico
- Author: Jordan Biro Walters
- Publisher: University of Washington Press
- Publication date: 2023
- Pages: 296
- ISBN: 9780295751016
- OCLC: 10017489981

Wide-Open Desert: A Queer History of New Mexico is a non-fiction book by Jordan Biro Walters. It was published in 2023 by University of Washington Press. The book describes the history of the queer community in New Mexico throughout the twentieth century. It tells the history of the Taos Society and the 1969 Love-Lust controversy, and describes the lives of painter Agnes "Agnes" Sims, author Walter Willard "Spud" Johnson, activist Harry Hay, and artists Agnes Martin and Hastíín Klah.

Reviewers praised Wide-Open Desert for Biro Water's description and focus on the intersection between the White, Latino, and Indigenous queer communities, as well as her focus on queer New Mexicans outside of larger cities such as Santa Fe. However, a review in Pacific Historical Review felt that the book could have focused more on Chicana lesbians.

The Western Historical Quarterly described the central themes Biro Walters studied as "creative expression and mobility", and the Southwestern Historical Quarterly praised the way Biro Walters handled the intersection between art, culture, and queer activism. One reviewer noted the book's "wide source base, " including various documents, newspapers, interviews, art, and erotic photography.
