= Transgender =

Gender identity differing from sex assigned at birth

- Transgender flag
- Classification: Gender modality; Gender identity
- Abbreviations: TG; trans
- Subcategories: Trans woman; Trans man; Non-binary and genderqueer; Third gender

Other terms
- Associated terms: Transsexual

A transgender (often shortened to trans) person has a gender identity different from that typically associated with the sex they were assigned at birth. The opposite of transgender is cisgender, which describes persons whose gender identity matches their assigned sex. Transgender does not have a universally accepted definition, including among researchers; it can function as an umbrella term. The definition given above includes binary trans men and trans women and may also include people who are non-binary or genderqueer.

Being transgender is distinct from sexual orientation, and transgender people may identify as heterosexual (straight), homosexual (gay or lesbian), bisexual, asexual, or otherwise, or may decline to label their sexual orientation. Accurate statistics on the number of transgender people vary widely, in part due to different definitions of what constitutes being transgender. Some countries collect census data on transgender people. Canada was the first country to introduce collection of census data on its transgender and non-binary population in 2021. Generally, less than 1% of the worldwide population is transgender, with figures ranging from <0.1% to 0.6%.

Many transgender people experience gender dysphoria and seek medical treatments such as hormone replacement therapy, gender-affirming surgery, or psychotherapy. Not all transgender people desire these treatments, and some cannot undergo them for legal, financial, or medical reasons. Many transgender people desire medical assistance to medically transition from one sex to another; those who do may identify as transsexual.

The legal status of transgender people varies by jurisdiction. Many transgender people experience transphobia (violence or discrimination against transgender people) in the workplace, in accessing public accommodations, and in healthcare. In many places, they are not legally protected from discrimination. Several cultural events are held to celebrate the awareness of transgender people, including Transgender Day of Remembrance and International Transgender Day of Visibility, and the transgender flag is a common transgender pride symbol.

== Terminology ==
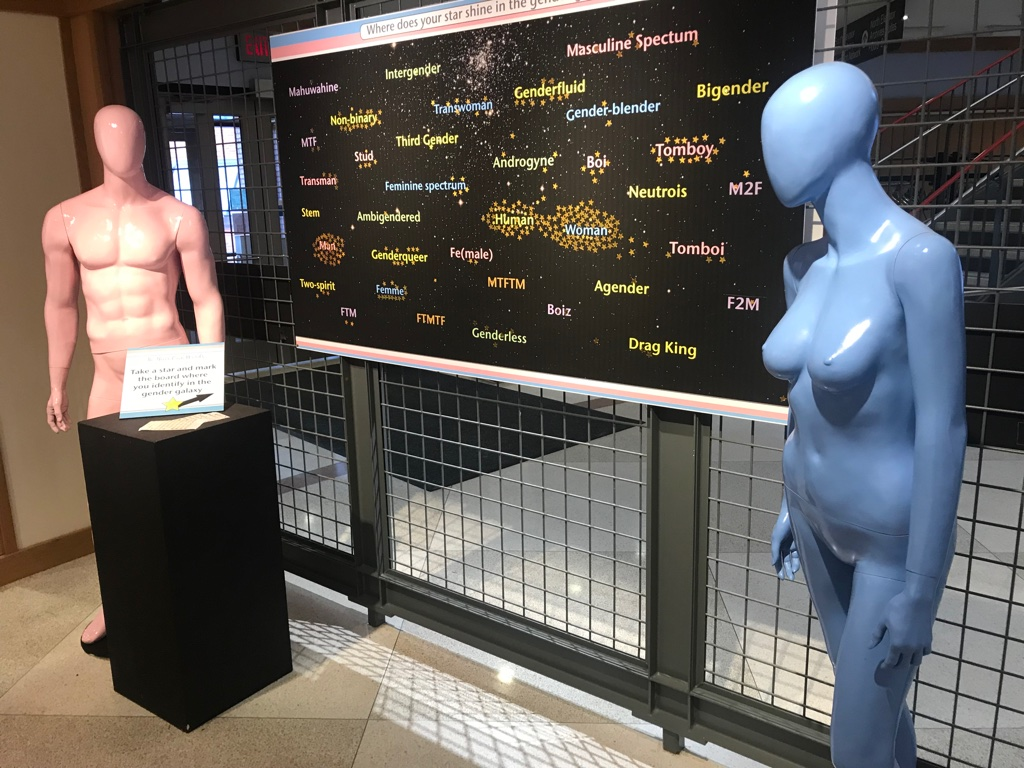
A display on gender identity in the Elmer L. Andersen Library at the University of Minnesota in Minneapolis, Minnesota

Before the mid-20th century, various terms were used within and beyond Western medical and psychological sciences to identify persons and identities labeled transsexual, and later transgender from mid-century onward. Imported from the German and ultimately modeled after German Transsexualismus (coined in 1923), the English term transsexual has enjoyed international acceptability, though transgender has been increasingly preferred over transsexual. The word transgender acquired its modern umbrella term meaning in the 1990s.

Health-practitioner manuals, professional journalistic style guides, and LGBTQ advocacy groups advise the adoption by others of the name and pronouns identified by the person in question, including present references to the transgender person's past.

=== Transgender ===
Although the term transgenderism was once considered acceptable, it has come to be viewed as pejorative, according to GLAAD. Psychiatrist John F. Oliven of Columbia University used the term transgenderism in his 1965 reference work Sexual Hygiene and Pathology, writing that the term which had previously been used, transsexualism, "is misleading; actually, transgenderism is meant, because sexuality is not a major factor in primary transvestism". The term transgender was then popularized with varying definitions by transgender, transsexual, and transvestite people, including Christine Jorgensen and Virginia Prince, who used transgenderal in the December 1969 issue of Transvestia, a national magazine for cross-dressers she founded. By the mid-1970s both trans-gender and trans people were in use as umbrella terms, while transgenderist and transgenderal were used to refer to people who wanted to live their lives as cross-gendered individuals without gender-affirming surgery. Transgenderist was sometimes abbreviated as TG in educational and community resources; this abbreviation developed by the 1980s. In 2020, the International Journal of Transgenderism changed its name to the International Journal of Transgender Health "to reflect a change toward more appropriate and acceptable use of language in our field."

By 1984, the concept of a "transgender community" had developed, in which transgender was used as an umbrella term. In 1985, Richard Ekins established the "Trans-Gender Archive" at the University of Ulster. By 1992, the International Conference on Transgender Law and Employment Policy defined transgender as an expansive umbrella term including "transsexuals, transgenderists, cross dressers", and anyone transitioning. Leslie Feinberg's pamphlet, "Transgender Liberation: A Movement Whose Time has Come", circulated in 1992, identified transgender as a term to unify all forms of gender nonconformity; in this way transgender has become synonymous with queer. In 1994, gender theorist Susan Stryker defined transgender as encompassing "all identities or practices that cross over, cut across, move between, or otherwise queer socially constructed sex/gender boundaries", including, but not limited to, "transsexuality, heterosexual transvestism, gay drag, butch lesbianism, and such non-European identities as the Native American berdache or the Indian Hijra".

Transgender can also refer specifically to a person whose gender identity is opposite (rather than different from) the sex the person had or was identified as having at birth. In contrast, people whose sense of personal identity corresponds to the sex and gender assigned to them at birth – that is, those who are neither transgender nor non-binary or genderqueer – are called cisgender.

=== Transsexual ===
Inspired by Magnus Hirschfeld's 1923 term seelischer Transsexualismus, the term transsexual was introduced to English in 1949 by David Oliver Cauldwell and popularized by Harry Benjamin in 1966, around the same time transgender was coined and began to be popularized. Since the 1990s, transsexual has generally been used to refer to the subset of transgender people who desire to transition permanently to the gender with which they identify and who seek medical assistance (for example, sex reassignment surgery) with this.

Distinctions between the terms transgender and transsexual are commonly based on distinctions between gender and sex. Transsexuality may be said to deal more with physical aspects of one's sex, while transgender considerations deal more with one's psychological gender disposition or predisposition, as well as the related social expectations that may accompany a given gender role. Many transgender people reject the term transsexual. Christine Jorgensen publicly rejected transsexual in 1979 and instead identified herself in newsprint as trans-gender, saying, "gender doesn't have to do with bed partners, it has to do with identity." Some have objected to the term transsexual on the basis that it describes a condition related to gender identity rather than sexuality. Some people who identify as transsexual people object to being included in the transgender umbrella.

In his 2007 book Imagining Transgender: An Ethnography of a Category, anthropologist David Valentine asserts that transgender was coined and used by activists to include many people who do not necessarily identify with the term and states that people who do not identify with the term transgender should not be included in the transgender spectrum. Leslie Feinberg likewise asserts that transgender is not a self-identifier (for some people) but a category imposed by observers to understand other people. According to the Transgender Health Program (THP) at Fenway Health in Boston, there are no universally-accepted definitions, and confusion is common because terms that were popular at the turn of the 21st century may have since been deemed offensive. The THP recommends that clinicians ask clients what terminology they prefer, and avoid the term transsexual unless they are sure that a client is comfortable with it.

Harry Benjamin invented a classification system for transsexuals and transvestites, called the Sex Orientation Scale (SOS), in which he assigned transsexuals and transvestites to one of six categories based on their reasons for cross-dressing and the relative urgency of their need (if any) for sex reassignment surgery. Contemporary views on gender identity and classification differ markedly from Harry Benjamin's original opinions. Sexual orientation is no longer regarded as a criterion for diagnosis, or for distinction between transsexuality, transvestism and other forms of gender-variant behavior and expression. Benjamin's scale was designed for use with heterosexual trans women, and trans men's identities do not align with its categories.

=== Other terms ===
- Transfeminine (commonly abbreviated to both transfem and transfemme) refers to a person, binary or non-binary, who was assigned male at birth and has a predominantly feminine gender identity or presentation.
- Transmasculine (commonly abbreviated to transmasc) refers to a person, binary or non-binary, who was assigned female at birth and has a predominantly masculine gender identity or presentation.
- Transgendered is a common term in older literature. Many within the transgender community deprecate it on the basis that transgender is an adjective, not a verb. Organizations such as GLAAD and The Guardian also state that transgender should never be used as a noun in English (e.g., "Max is transgender" or "Max is a transgender man", not "Max is a transgender"). Transgender is also a noun for the broader topic of transgender identity and experience.
- Assigned Female At Birth (AFAB), Assigned Male At Birth (AMAB), Designated Female At Birth (DFAB), and Designated Male At Birth (DMAB) are terms used to represent a person's sex assigned at birth; they are considered to be more gender-inclusive than the related terms biological male or biological female.
- The term trans* (with an asterisk) emerged in the 1990s as an inclusive term used to encompass a wide range of non-cisgender identities. First used in 1995 on an online Usenet forum, it entered common use in the early 21st century within activist, academic, and online communities. It was originally used to explicitly include both transgender and transsexual, but in modern use it is usually used as a more inclusive version of "trans", explicitly including identities such as genderqueer, agender, and genderfluid. The asterisk represents a wildcard, indicating the inclusion of various identities, beyond just transgender and transsexual, such as gender-fluid or agender, within the transgender umbrella. The use of the asterisk in trans* has been debated; some argue that it adds unnecessary complexity, while others say that it enhances inclusivity by explicitly recognizing non-normative gender identities. The term is incompatible with many common search engines such as Google because the "*" is interpreted as a wildcard character, yielding results with the "trans-" prefix instead of the literal trans*.

=== Shift in use of terms ===
Between the mid-1990s and the early 2000s, the primary terms used under the transgender umbrella were "female to male" (FtM) for men who transitioned from female to male, and "male to female" (MtF) for women who transitioned from male to female. These terms have been superseded by "trans man" and "trans woman", respectively. This shift in preference from terms highlighting biological sex ("transsexual", "FtM") to terms highlighting gender identity and expression ("transgender", "trans man") reflects a broader shift in the understanding of transgender people's sense of self and the increasing recognition of those who decline medical reassignment as part of the transgender community.

In place of transgenderism, terms such as transness, transgenderness, or transidentity, have been suggested, corresponding to their cisgender counterparts, such as cisness, cisgenderness and cisidentity.

== Sexual orientation ==
Gender, gender identity, and being transgender are distinct concepts from sexual orientation. Sexual orientation is an individual's enduring pattern of attraction, or lack thereof, to others (being straight, lesbian, gay, bisexual, asexual, etc.), whereas gender identity is a person's innate knowledge of their own gender (being a man, woman, non-binary, etc.). Transgender people can have any orientation, and generally use labels corresponding to their gender, rather than assigned sex at birth. For example, trans women who are exclusively attracted to other women commonly identify as lesbians, and trans men exclusively attracted to women would identify as straight. Many trans people describe their sexual orientation as queer, in addition to or instead of, other terms.

For much of the 20th century, transgender identity was conflated with homosexuality and transvestism. In earlier academic literature, sexologists used the labels homosexual and heterosexual transsexual to categorize transgender individuals' sexual orientation based on their birth sex. Critics consider these terms "heterosexist", "archaic", and demeaning. Newer literature often uses terms such as attracted to men (androphilic), attracted to women (gynephilic), attracted to both (bisexual), or attracted to neither (asexual) to describe a person's sexual orientation without reference to their gender identity. Therapists are coming to understand the necessity of using terms with respect to their clients' gender identities and preferences.

The 2015 U.S. Transgender Survey reported that of the 27,715 transgender and non-binary respondents, 21% said queer best described their sexual orientation, 18% said pansexual, 16% said gay, lesbian, or same-gender-loving, 15% said straight, 14% said bisexual, and 10% said asexual. A 2019 Canadian survey of 2,873 trans and non-binary people found that 51% described their sexual orientation as queer, 13% as asexual, 28% as bisexual, 13% as gay, 15% as lesbian, 31% as pansexual, 8% as straight or heterosexual, 4% as two-spirit, and 9% as unsure or questioning. A 2009 study in Spain found that 90% of trans women patients reported being androphilic and 94% of trans men patients reported being gynephilic.

== Related identities and practices ==
=== Non-binary identity ===
Some non-binary (or genderqueer) people identify as transgender. These identities are not specifically male or female. They can be agender, androgynous, bigender, pangender, or genderfluid, and exist outside of cisnormativity. Bigender and androgynous are overlapping categories; bigender individuals may identify as moving between male and female roles (genderfluid) or as being both masculine and feminine simultaneously (androgynous), and androgynes may similarly identify as beyond gender or genderless (agender), between genders (intergender), moving across genders (genderfluid), or simultaneously exhibiting multiple genders (pangender). Non-binary gender identities are independent of sexual orientation.

=== Cross-dressing (transvestism) ===
A cross-dresser or crossdresser is a person who dresses in clothes typically associated with the gender opposite the one they were assigned at birth. The term transvestite was formerly used, although cross-dresser is now the preferred term. The term cross-dresser is not exactly defined in the relevant literature. Michael A. Gilbert, professor at the Department of Philosophy, York University, Toronto, offers this definition: "[A cross-dresser] is a person who has an apparent gender identification with one sex, and who has and certainly has been birth-designated as belonging to [that] sex, but who wears the clothing of the opposite sex because it is that of the opposite sex." This definition excludes people "who wear opposite sex clothing for other reasons", such as "those female impersonators who look upon dressing as solely connected to their livelihood, actors undertaking roles, individual males and females enjoying a masquerade, and so on. These individuals are cross dressing but are not cross dressers." Cross-dressers may not identify with, want to be, or adopt the behaviors or practices of the opposite gender and generally do not want to change their bodies medically or surgically. The majority of cross-dressers identify as heterosexual.

The term transvestite and the associated outdated term transvestism are different from the term transvestic disorder, as transvestic dısorder in the Unıted States Diagnostic and Statistical Manual of Mental Disorders (DSM) is sexual arousal from cross-dressing "that causes clinically significant distress or functional impairment in one or more important areas of life." In the International Classification of Diseases it is not a specıfıc dısorder, but is ın the more general category of paraphilic disorder but only if "associated with marked distress that is not simply a result of rejection or feared rejection of the arousal pattern by others or with significant risk of injury or death".

=== Drag ===
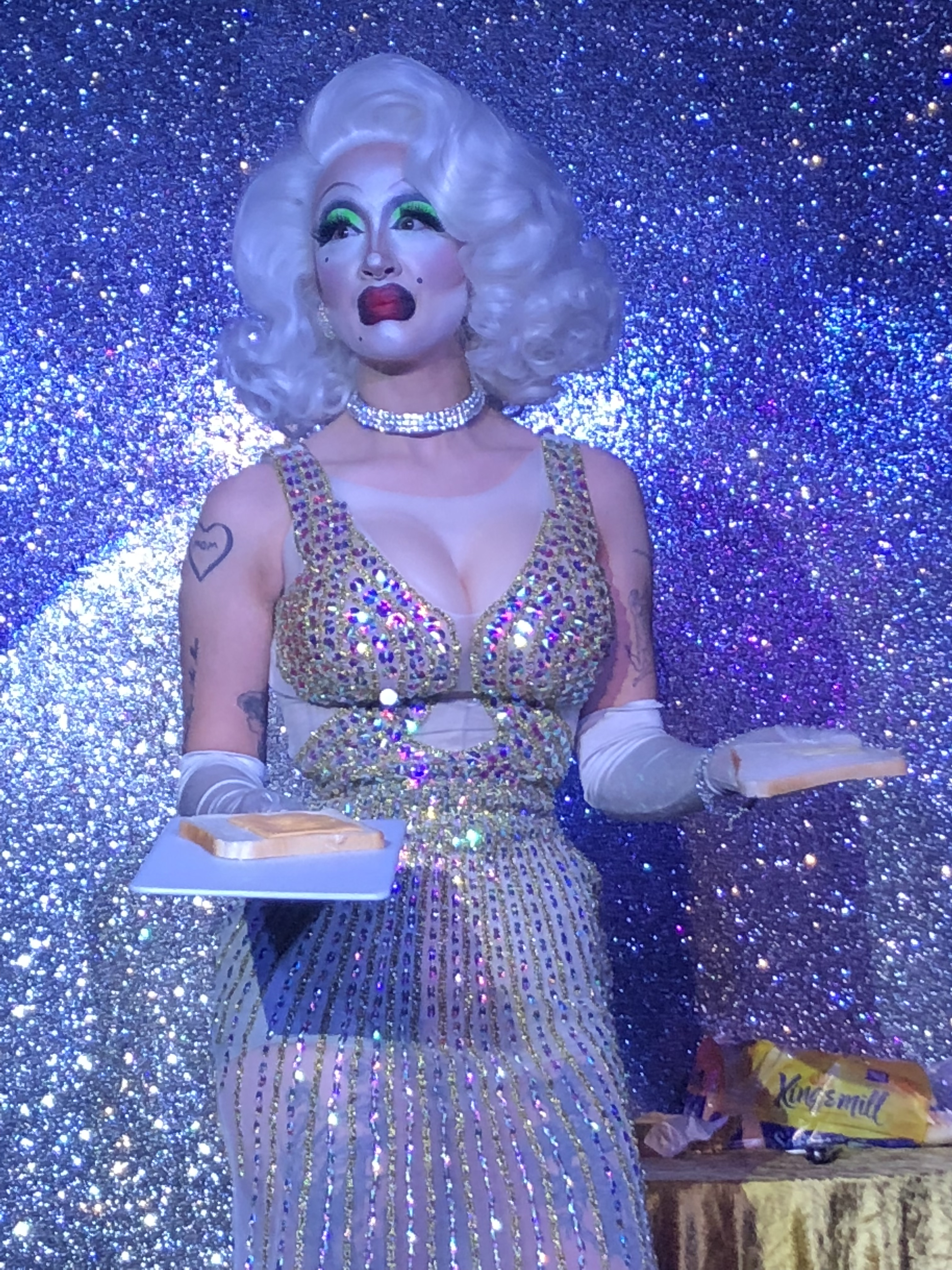
A drag queen performer. Drag performers are not inherently transgender.

Drag is clothing and makeup worn on special occasions for performing or entertaining, unlike those who are transgender or who cross-dress for other reasons. Drag performance includes overall presentation and behavior in addition to clothing and makeup. Drag can be theatrical, comedic, or grotesque. Drag queens have been considered caricatures of women by second-wave feminism. Drag artists have a long tradition in LGBTQ culture.

Generally the term drag queen covers men doing female drag, drag king covers women doing male drag, and faux queen covers women doing female drag. Nevertheless, there are drag artists of all genders and sexualities who perform for various reasons. Drag performers are not inherently considered transgender. However, for some trans people, drag communities have been "a safe and fun arena for exploring gender identity". Some drag performers such as Carmen Carerra have later come out as transgender. Drag historian Devin Antheus stated there were overlaps in the past, such as in the 1960s and 1970s: "for a lot of the girls, both queens who currently now identify as trans and those who don't, back in the day, there weren't such precise divisions when people were in internal spaces … they all rolled together."

Some drag performers, transvestites, and people in the gay community have embraced the pornographically derived term tranny for drag queens or people who engage in transvestism or cross-dressing; this term is widely considered an offensive slur if applied to transgender people.

== History ==
A precise history of the global occurrence of transgender people is difficult to assess because the modern concept of being transgender, and of gender in general in relation to transgender identity, did not develop until the mid-1900s. Historical depictions, records and understandings are inherently filtered through modern principles, and were largely viewed through a medical and (often outsider) anthropological lens until the late 1900s.

Some historians consider the Roman emperor Elagabalus to have been transgender. Elagabalus was reported to have dressed in a feminine manner, preferred to be called "Lady" instead of "Lord" and may have even sought a primitive form of gender-affirming surgery.

Worldwide, a number of societies have had traditional third gender roles, some of which continue in some form into the present day. The Hippocratic Corpus (interpreting the writing of Herodotus) describes the "disease of the Scythians" (regarding the Enaree), which it attributes to impotency due to riding on a horse without stirrups. This reference was well discussed by medical writings of the 1500s–1700s. Pierre Petit writing in 1596 viewed the "Scythian disease" as natural variation, but by the 1700s writers viewed it as a "melancholy", or "hysterical" psychiatric disease. By the early 1800s, being transgender separate from Hippocrates' idea of it was claimed to be widely known, but remained poorly documented. Both trans women and trans men were cited in European insane asylums of the early 1800s. One of the earliest recorded gender nonconforming people in America was Thomas(ine) Hall, a seventeenth century colonial servant. The most complete account of the time came from the life of the Chevalière d'Éon (1728–1810), a French diplomat. As cross-dressing became more widespread in the late 1800s, discussion of transgender people increased greatly and writers attempted to explain the origins of being transgender. Much study came out of Germany, and was exported to other Western audiences. Cross-dressing was seen in a pragmatic light until the late 1800s; it had previously served a satirical or disguising purpose. But in the latter half of the 1800s, cross-dressing and being transgender became viewed as an increasing societal danger.

William A. Hammond wrote an 1882 account of transgender Pueblo "shamans" [sic] (mujerados), comparing them to the Scythian disease. Other writers of the late 1700s and 1800s (including Hammond's associates in the American Neurological Association) had noted the widespread nature of transgender cultural practices among native peoples. Explanations varied, but authors generally did not ascribe native transgender practices to psychiatric causes, instead condemning the practices in a religious and moral sense. Native groups provided much study on the subject, and perhaps the majority of all study until after WWII.

Critical studies first began to emerge in the late 1800s in Germany, with the works of Magnus Hirschfeld. Hirschfeld coined the term "Transvestit" in 1910, borrowed from 19th-century French word travesti with the same meaning, as the scope of transgender study grew, and it was translated to English as "transvestite". His work would lead to the 1919 founding of the Institut für Sexualwissenschaft in Berlin. Though Hirscheld's legacy is disputed, he revolutionized the field of study. The Institut was destroyed when the Nazis seized power in 1933, and its research was infamously burned in the May 1933 Nazi book burnings. Transgender issues went largely out of the public eye until after World War II. Even when they re-emerged, they reflected a forensic psychology approach, unlike the more sexological that had been employed in the lost German research.

== Healthcare ==
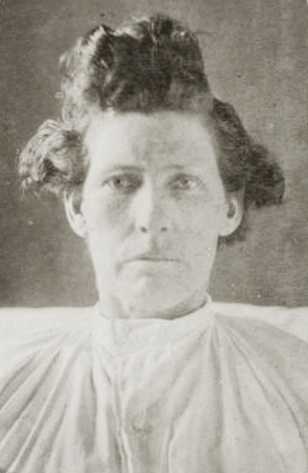
1879 photograph of Edward de Lacy Evans, upon his admittance into Kew Lunatic Asylum. Evans identified as a man for the majority of his life, later becoming known in Melbourne as the "Wonderful Male Impersonator".

=== Mental healthcare ===
People who experience discord between their gender and the expectations of others or whose gender identity conflicts with their body may benefit by talking through their feelings in depth. While individuals may find counseling or psychotherapy helpful, it is no longer recommended as a prerequisite for further transition steps. Research on gender identity with regard to psychology, and scientific understanding of the phenomenon and its related issues has existed for decades. The term gender incongruence is listed in the ICD by the WHO. In the American Diagnostic and Statistical Manual of Mental Disorders (DSM), the term gender dysphoria is listed under code F64.0 for adolescents and adults, and F64.2 for children.

France removed gender identity disorder as a diagnosis by decree in 2010, but according to French trans rights organizations, beyond the impact of the announcement itself, nothing changed. In 2017, the Danish parliament abolished the F64 Gender identity disorders. The DSM-5 refers to the topic as gender dysphoria (GD) while reinforcing the idea that being transgender is not considered a mental illness.

Transgender people may meet the criteria for a diagnosis of gender dysphoria "only if [being transgender] causes distress or disability." This distress may manifest as depression or inability to work and form healthy relationships with others. This diagnosis is often misinterpreted as implying that all transgender people suffer from GD, which has confused transgender people and those who seek to either criticize or affirm them. Transgender people who are comfortable with their gender and whose gender is not directly causing inner frustration or impairing their functioning do not suffer from GD. Moreover, GD is not necessarily permanent and is often resolved through therapy or transitioning. Feeling oppressed by the negative attitudes and behaviours of such others as legal entities does not indicate GD. GD does not imply an opinion of immorality; the psychological establishment holds that people with any kind of mental or emotional problem should not receive stigma. The solution for GD is whatever will alleviate suffering and restore functionality; this solution often, but not always, consists of undergoing a gender transition.

Clinical training lacks relevant information needed in order to adequately help transgender clients, which results in a large number of practitioners who are not prepared to sufficiently work with this population of individuals. Many mental healthcare providers know little about transgender issues. Those who seek help from these professionals often educate the professional without receiving help. This solution usually is good for transsexual people but is not the solution for other transgender people, particularly non-binary people who lack an exclusively male or female identity. Instead, therapists can support their clients in whatever steps they choose to take to transition or can support their decision not to transition while also addressing their clients' sense of congruence between gender identity and appearance.

Research on the specific problems faced by the transgender community in mental health has focused on diagnosis and clinicians' experiences instead of transgender clients' experiences. Therapy was not always sought by transgender people due to mental health needs. Prior to the seventh version of the Standards of Care (SOC), an individual had to be diagnosed with gender identity disorder in order to proceed with hormone treatments or sexual reassignment surgery. The new version decreased the focus on diagnosis and instead emphasized the importance of flexibility in order to meet the diverse health care needs of transsexual, transgender, and all gender-nonconforming people.

The reasons for seeking mental health services vary according to the individual. A transgender person seeking treatment does not necessarily mean their gender identity is problematic. The emotional strain of dealing with stigma and experiencing transphobia pushes many transgender people to seek treatment to improve their quality of life. As one trans woman reflected, "Transgendered individuals are going to come to a therapist and most of their issues have nothing to do, specifically, with being transgendered. It has to do because they've had to hide, they've had to lie, and they've felt all of this guilt and shame, unfortunately usually for years!" Many transgender people also seek mental health treatment for depression and anxiety caused by the stigma attached to being transgender, and some transgender people have stressed the importance of acknowledging their gender identity with a therapist in order to discuss other quality-of-life issues. Rarely, some choose to detransition.

Problems still remain surrounding misinformation about transgender issues that hurt transgender people's mental health experiences. One trans man who was enrolled as a student in a psychology graduate program highlighted the main concerns with modern clinical training: "Most people probably are familiar with the term transgender, but maybe that's it. I don't think I've had any formal training just going through [clinical] programs ... I don't think most [therapists] know. Most therapists – Master's degree, PhD level – they've had ... one diversity class on GLBT issues. One class out of the huge diversity training. One class. And it was probably mostly about gay lifestyle." Many health insurance policies do not cover treatment associated with gender transition, and numerous people are under- or uninsured, which raises concerns about the insufficient training most therapists receive prior to working with transgender clients, potentially increasing financial strain on clients without providing the treatment they need. Many clinicians who work with transgender clients only receive mediocre training on gender identity, but introductory training on interacting with transgender people has recently been made available to health care professionals to help remove barriers and increase the level of service for the transgender population. In May 2009, France became the first country in the world to remove transgender identity from the list of mental diseases.

A 2014 study carried out by the Williams Institute (a UCLA think tank) found that 41% of transgender people had attempted suicide, with the rate being higher among people who experienced discrimination in access to housing or healthcare, harassment, physical or sexual assault, or rejection by family. A 2019 follow-up study found that transgender people who wanted and received gender-affirming medical care had significantly lower rates of suicidal thoughts and attempts. Another study on the impact of parental support on trans youth found that among trans children with supportive parents, only 4% attempted suicide, a 93% decrease.

Suicidal thoughts and attempts by gender affirmation milestones
| Intervention Category | Suicidal Thoughts (Past 12 Months) | Suicidal Attempts (Past 12 Months) | Lifetime Suicidal Thoughts | Lifetime Suicidal Attempts |
|---|---|---|---|---|
| Want hormones and have not had them | 57.9 | 8.9 | 84.4 | 41.1 |
| Want hormones and have had them | 42.9 | 6.5 | 81.9 | 42.4 |
| Want reassignment surgery, have not had | 54.8 | 8.5 | 83.9 | 41.5 |
| Want reassignment surgery, have had | 38.2 | 5.1 | 79.0 | 39.5 |
| Have not "de-transitioned" | 44.2 | 6.7 | 81.6 | 41.8 |
| Have "de-transitioned" | 57.3 | 11.8 | 86.0 | 52.5 |

Autism is more common in people who are gender dysphoric. It is not known whether there is a biological basis. This may be due to the fact that people on the autism spectrum are less concerned with societal disapproval, and feel less fear or inhibition about coming out as trans than others.

=== Physical healthcare ===
Medical and surgical procedures exist for transsexual and some transgender people, though most categories of transgender people as described above are not known for seeking the following treatments. Hormone replacement therapy for trans men induces beard growth and masculinizes skin, hair, voice, and fat distribution. Hormone replacement therapy for trans women feminizes fat distribution and breasts, as well as diminishes muscle mass and strength. Laser hair removal or electrolysis removes excess hair for trans women. Surgical procedures for trans women feminize the voice, skin, face, Adam's apple, breasts, waist, buttocks, and genitals. Surgical procedures for trans men masculinize the chest and genitals and remove the womb, ovaries, and fallopian tubes. The acronyms "Gender-affirming surgery (GAS)" and "sex reassignment surgery" (SRS) refer to genital surgery. The term "sex reassignment therapy" (SRT) is used as an umbrella term for physical procedures required for transition. Use of the term "sex change" has been criticized for its emphasis on surgery, and the term "transition" is preferred. Availability of these procedures depends on degree of gender dysphoria, presence or absence of gender identity disorder, and standards of care in the relevant jurisdiction.

Health risks among transgender people largely align with those of cisgender people with the same hormonal makeup, and the same routine cancer screenings are generally recommended as for cisgender people with the same organs. It has been suggested that trans men who have not had a hysterectomy and who take testosterone may be at increased risk for endometrial cancer due to the presence of external estrogen, but this theoretical risk has not been proven in a clinical setting, and providers do not recommend any additional preventive measures or routine screening.

=== Detransition ===
Detransition refers to the cessation or reversal of a sex reassignment surgery or gender transition. Formal studies of detransition have been few in number, of disputed quality, and politically controversial. Estimates of the rate at which detransitioning occurs vary from less than 1% to as high as 13%. Those who undergo sex reassignment surgery have very low rates of detransition or regret.

The 2015 U.S. Transgender Survey, with responses from 27,715 individuals who identified as "transgender, trans, genderqueer, [or] non-binary", found that 8% of respondents reported some kind of detransition. "Most of those who de-transitioned did so only temporarily: 62% of those who had de-transitioned reported that they were currently living full time in a gender different than the gender they were thought to be at birth." Detransition was associated with assigned male sex at birth, non-binary gender identity, and bisexual orientation, among other cohorts. Only 5% of detransitioners (or 0.4% of total respondents) reported doing so because gender transition was "not for them"; 82% cited external reason(s), including pressure from others, the difficulties of transition, and discrimination. "The most common reason cited for de-transitioning was pressure from a parent (36%)."

== Legality ==
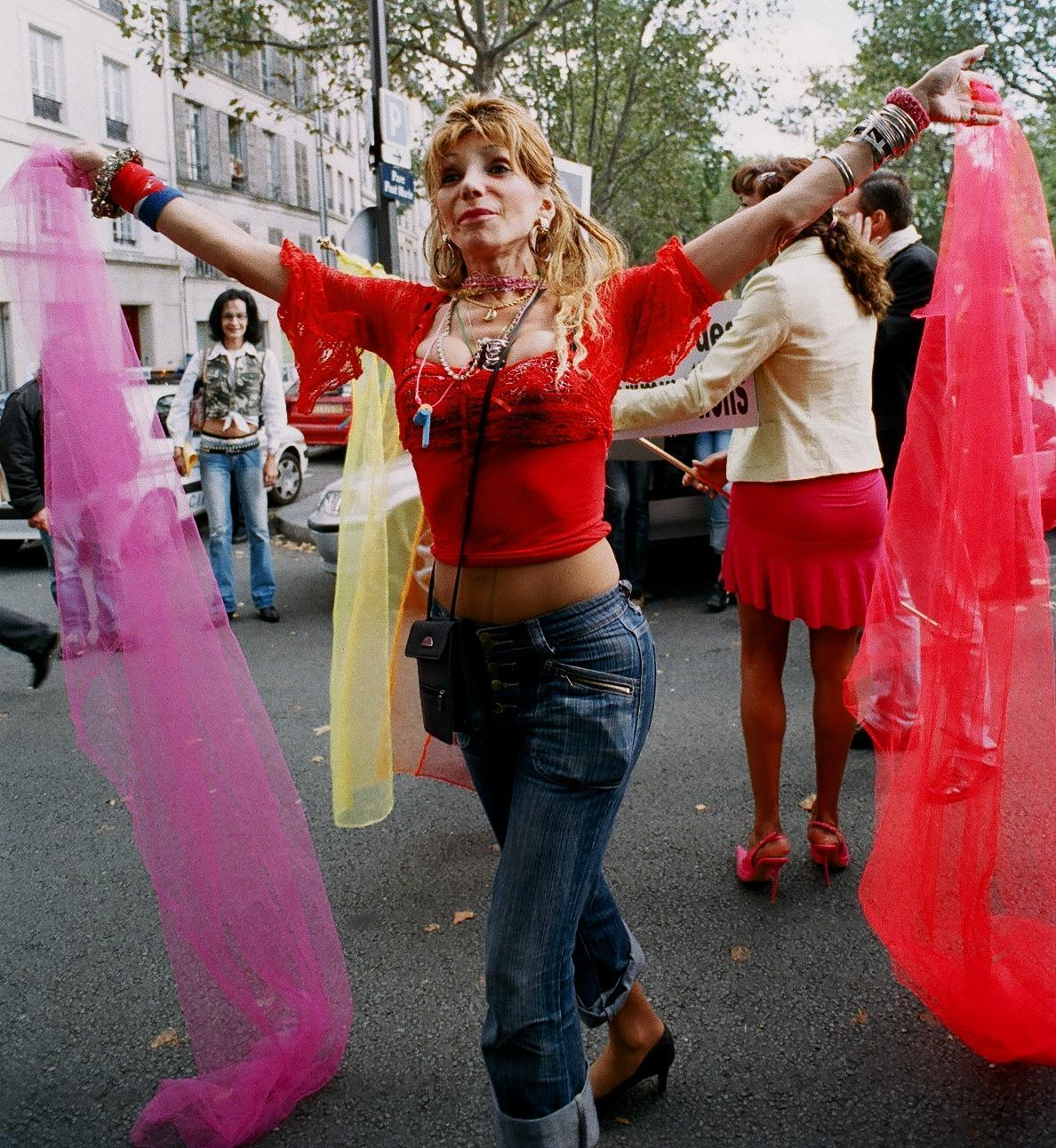
Camille Cabral, a French transgender activist, at a Paris demonstration for transgender people in 2005

Legal procedures exist in some jurisdictions which allow individuals to change their legal gender or name to reflect their gender identity. Requirements for these procedures vary from an explicit formal diagnosis of transsexualism, to a diagnosis of gender identity disorder, to a letter from a physician that attests the individual's gender transition or having established a different gender role. In 1994, the DSM IV entry was changed from "Transsexual" to "Gender Identity Disorder". In 2013, the DSM V removed "Gender Identity Disorder" and published "Gender Dysphoria" in its place. In many places, transgender people are not legally protected from discrimination in the workplace or in public accommodations. A report released in February 2011 found that 90% of transgender Americans faced discrimination at work and were unemployed at double the rate of the general population, and over half had been harassed or turned away when attempting to access public services. Members of the transgender community also encounter high levels of discrimination in health care.

=== Europe ===
A Welsh Government advisory video on transgender hate crimes

As of 2017, 36 countries in Europe require a mental health diagnosis for legal gender recognition and 20 countries require sterilisation. In April 2017, the European Court of Human Rights ruled that requiring sterilisation for legal gender recognition violates human rights.

=== Canada ===
Jurisdiction over legal classification of sex in Canada is assigned to the provinces and territories. This includes legal change of gender classification. On June 19, 2017, Bill C-16, having passed the legislative process in the House of Commons of Canada and the Senate of Canada, became law upon receiving Royal Assent, which put it into immediate force. The law updated the Canadian Human Rights Act and the Criminal Code to include "gender identity and gender expression" as protected grounds from discrimination, hate publications and advocating transgender genocide. The bill also added "gender identity and expression" to the list of aggravating factors in sentencing, where the accused commits a criminal offence against an individual because of those personal characteristics. Similar transgender laws also exist in all the provinces and territories.

=== United States ===
In the United States, transgender people are protected from employment discrimination by Title VII of the Civil Rights Act of 1964. Exceptions apply to certain types of employers, for example, employers with fewer than 15 employees and religious organizations. In 2020, the U.S. Supreme Court affirmed that Title VII prohibits discrimination against transgender people in the case R.G. & G.R. Harris Funeral Homes Inc. v. Equal Employment Opportunity Commission.

In 2016, the United States Department of Education and Department of Justice issued guidance directing public schools to allow transgender students to use bathrooms that match their gender identities. The same year, the United States Department of Defense removed the ban that prohibited transgender people from openly serving in the US military. After back-and-forth reversals by presidents Donald Trump, Joe Biden, and Trump again, and various stays and reversals in the federal courts, a ban is again in effect as of May 2025.

The topic of trans rights in the United States has often been contentious and has become a deeply partisan wedge issue since at least 2022; hundreds of pieces of legislation have been passed, and thousands proposed, that seek to limit the rights of transgender individuals, especially the right of minors to seek gender affirming care.

Compared with data from 2022, by 2025, Americans had become more supportive of restrictions for trans people and less supportive of laws aimed at protecting them. Public opinion polling conducted by the Pew Research Center showed that in 2025, 66% of Americans believed trans athletes should only be allowed to compete on teams that match their sex assigned at birth, while 56% of Americans believed that health care professionals should be banned from providing gender transition care to minors. There is a wide partisan gap in views of trans issues, with Republicans much more likely than Democrats to support policies that limit trans rights.

=== India ===
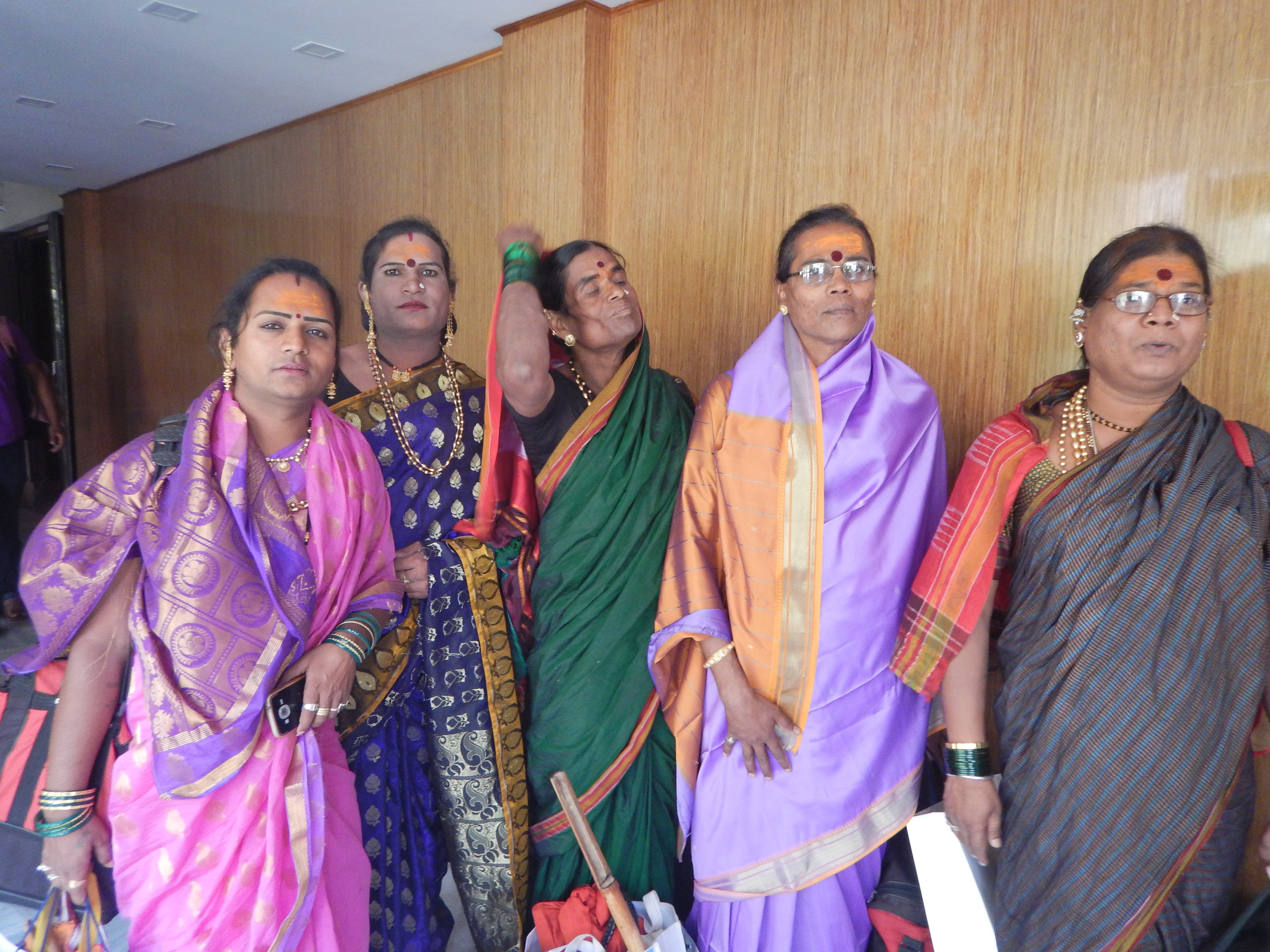
Jogappa is a transgender community in Karnataka and Andhra Pradesh. They are traditional folk singers and dancers.

In April 2014, the Supreme Court of India declared transgender to be a 'third gender' in Indian law. The transgender community in India (made up of Hijras and others) has a long history in India and in Hindu mythology. Justice KS Radhakrishnan noted in his decision that, "Seldom, our society realizes or cares to realize the trauma, agony and pain which the members of Transgender community undergo, nor appreciates the innate feelings of the members of the Transgender community, especially of those whose mind and body disown their biological sex". Hijras have faced structural discrimination including not being able to obtain driving licenses, and being prohibited from accessing various social benefits. It is also common for them to be banished from communities.

== Sociocultural relationships ==
=== LGBTQ community ===
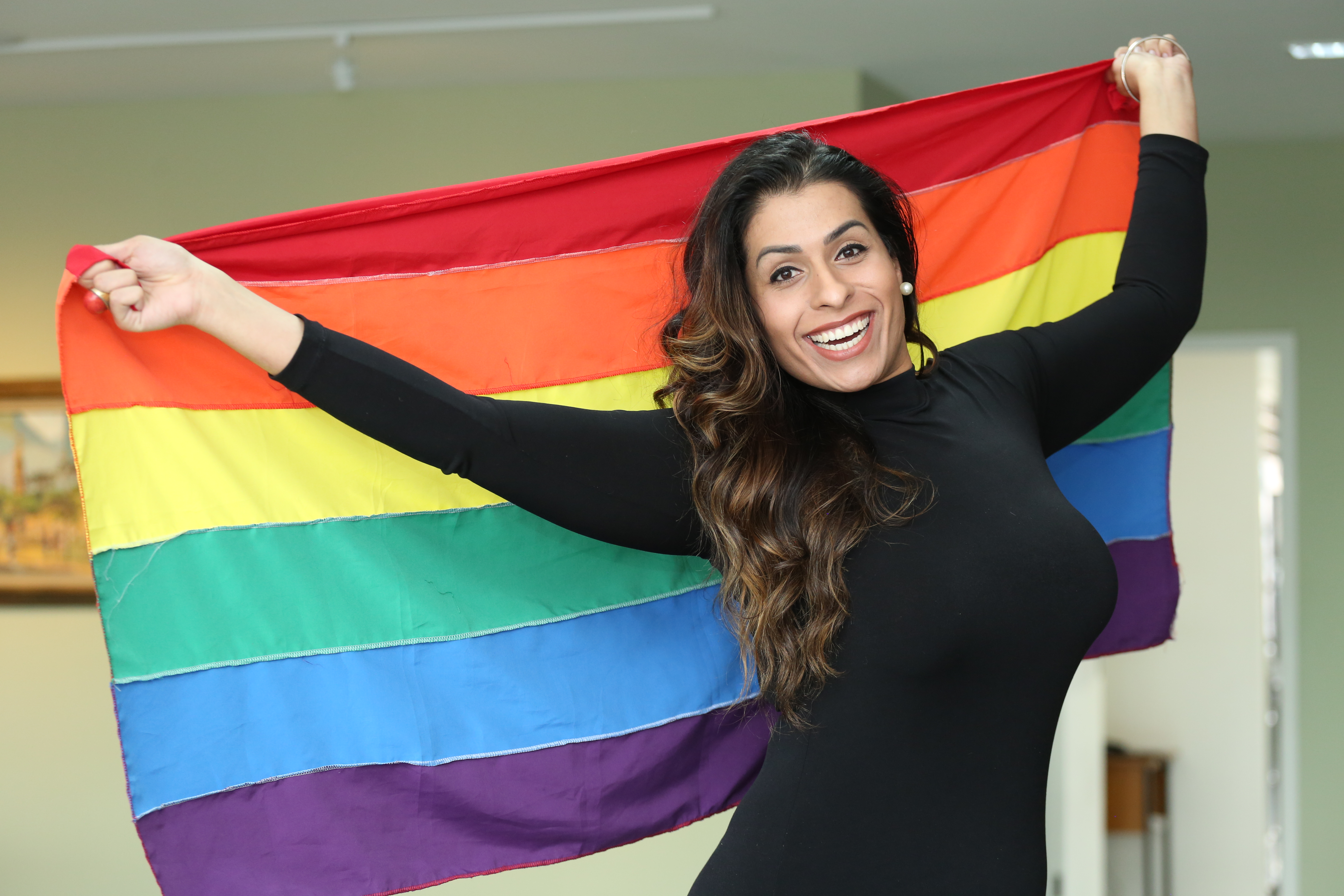
A rainbow flag held by a transgender person

Despite the distinction between sexual orientation and gender, throughout history gay, lesbian and bisexual subcultures were often the only places where gender-variant people were socially accepted in the gender role they felt they belonged to; especially during the time when legal or medical transitioning was almost impossible. This acceptance has had a complex history. Like the wider world, the gay community in Western societies did not generally distinguish between sex and gender identity until the 1970s, and the role of the transgender community in the history of LGBTQ rights is often overlooked.

Transgender individuals have been part of various LGBTQ movements throughout history, with significant contributions dating back to the early days of the gay liberation movement.

The LGBTQ community is not a monolithic group, and there are different modes of thought on who is a part of this diverse community. The changes that came with the Gay Liberation Movement and Civil Rights movement saw many gay, lesbian, and bisexual people making headway within the public sphere, and gaining support from the wider public, throughout the latter half of the twentieth century. The trans community only experienced a similar surge in activism during the start of the twenty-first century. Due to the many different groups that make up the broader LGBTQ movement, there are those within the larger community who do not believe that the trans community has a place within the LGBTQ space.

=== Feminism ===
Feminist views on transgender women have changed over time, but have generally become more positive. Second-wave feminism saw numerous clashes opposed to transgender women, since they were not seen as "true" women, and as invading women-only spaces. Though second-wave feminism argued for the sex and gender distinction, some feminists believed there was a conflict between transgender identity and the feminist cause; e.g., they believed that male-to-female transition abandoned or devalued female identity and that transgender people embraced traditional gender roles and stereotypes. By the emergence of third-wave feminism (around 1990), opinions had shifted to being more inclusive of both trans and gay identities. Fourth-wave feminism (starting around 2012) has been widely trans-inclusive, but trans-exclusive groups and ideas remain as a minority, though one that is especially prominent in the UK. Feminists who do not accept that trans women are women have been labeled "trans-exclusionary radical feminists" (TERFs) or gender-critical feminists by opponents.

=== Discrimination and support ===
Transgender individuals experience significant rates of employment discrimination. According to a 2011 aggregation of several studies, approximately 90% of transgender Americans had encountered some form of harassment or mistreatment in their workplace. 47% had experienced some form of adverse employment outcome due to being transgender; of this figure, 44% were passed over for a job, 23% were denied a promotion, and 26% were terminated on the grounds that they were transgender.

Studies in several cultures have found that cisgender women are more likely to be accepting of trans people than cisgender men.

The start of the twenty-first century saw the rise in transgender activism and with it an increase in support. Within the United States, groups such as the Trevor Project have been serving the wider LGBT community including people who identify with the term transgender. The group offers support in the form of educational resources including research, advocacy, and crisis services. The American Civil Liberties Unions (ACLU) also often represents members of the trans community.

Other groups within the United States specifically advocate for transgender rights. One of these groups directly related to transgender support is the National Center for Transgender Equality (NCTE), which is committed to advocating for policy changes that protect transgender people and promote equality. Through their research, education, and advocacy efforts, the NCTE works to address issues such as healthcare access, employment discrimination, and legal recognition for transgender individuals. One prominent organization within Europe is Transgender Europe (TGEU), a network of organizations and individuals committed to promoting equality and human rights for transgender people within European borders. TGEU works to challenge discrimination, improve transgender healthcare access, advocate for legal recognition of gender identity, and support the well-being of transgender communities.

== Demographics ==
Little is known about the prevalence of transgender people in the general population and reported prevalence estimates are greatly affected by variable definitions of transgender. According to a 2016 systematic review, an estimated 9.2 out of every 100,000 people have received or requested gender affirmation surgery or transgender hormone therapy; 6.8 out of every 100,000 people have received a transgender-specific diagnosis; and 355 out of every 100,000 people self-identify as transgender. These findings underscore the value of using consistent terminology related to studying the experience of transgender, as studies that explore surgical or hormonal gender affirmation therapy may or may not be connected with others that follow a diagnosis of "transsexualism", "gender identity disorder", or "gender dysphoria", none of which may relate with those that assess self-reported identity. Common terminology across studies does not yet exist, so population numbers may be inconsistent, depending on how they are being counted.

A study in 2020 found that, since 1990, of those seeking sex hormone therapy for gender dysphoria there has been a steady increase in the percentage of trans men, such that they equal the number of trans women seeking this treatment.

=== Asia ===
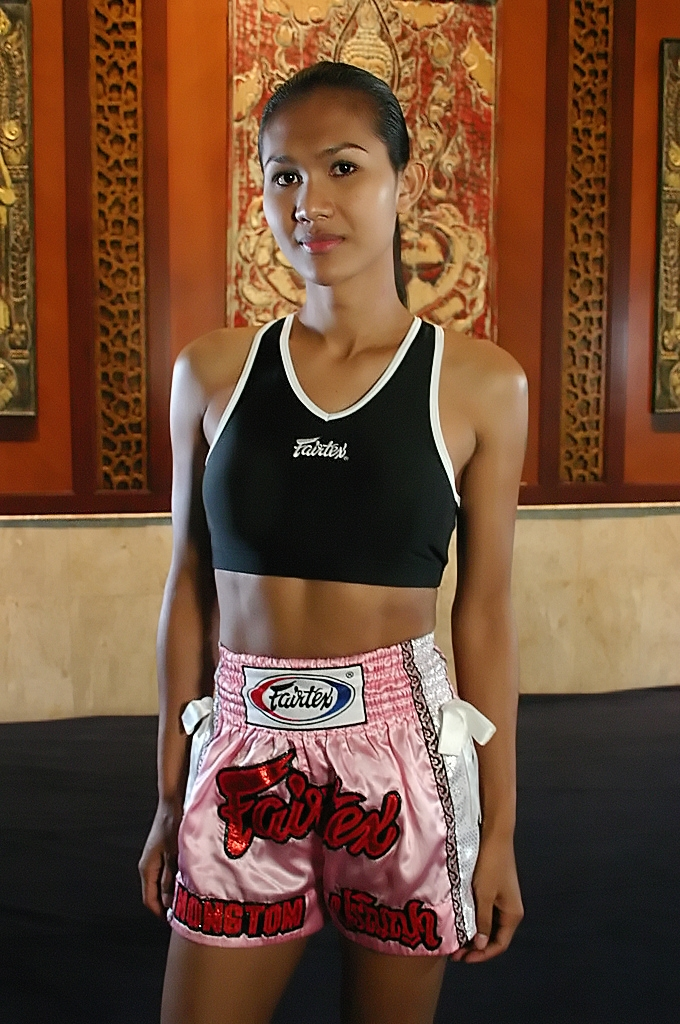
Nong Tum, a Kathoey who is internationally recognized for her performance in the film Beautiful Boxer

In Thailand and Laos, the term kathoey is used to refer to male-to-female transgender people and effeminate gay men. However, many transgender people in Thailand do not identify as kathoey.

In the Philippines, the umbrella term Bakla is commonly used but not solely for transgender women, it also includes effeminate gay men and non-binary people. Transgender people are becoming relatively visible and common in the post-colonial Philippines due to a mix of pre-colonial history, colonial influence, language, media, and social roles.

Transgender people have also been documented in Iran, Japan, Nepal, Indonesia, Vietnam, South Korea, Jordan, Singapore, and the greater Chinese region, including Hong Kong, Taiwan, and the People's Republic of China.

The cultures of the Indian subcontinent include a third gender, referred to as hijra in Hindi. In India, the Supreme Court on April 15, 2014, recognized a third gender that is neither male nor female, stating "Recognition of transgenders as a third gender is not a social or medical issue but a human rights issue." In 1998, Shabnam Mausi became the first transgender person to be elected in India, in the central Indian state of Madhya Pradesh.

=== Europe ===
According to Amnesty International, 1.5 million transgender people lived in the European Union as of 2017, making up 0.3% of the population. A 2011 survey conducted by the Equality and Human Rights Commission in the UK found that of 10,026 respondents, 1.4% would be classified into a gender minority group. The survey also showed that 1% had gone through any part of a gender reassignment process (including thoughts or actions).

=== North America ===
The 2021 Canadian census released by Statistics Canada found that 59,460 Canadians (0.19% of the population) identified as transgender. According to the Survey of Safety in Public and Private Spaces by Statistics Canada in 2018, 0.24% of the Canadian population identified as transgender men, women or non-binary individuals.

In the United States, over 2.8 million persons identify as transgender, as of 2025. It's the case for 1% of adults (about 2.1 million persons) and 3.3% of youth (about 724,000 persons aged 13 to 17). Among adults, 32.7% (698,500) are transgender women, 34.2% (730,500) transgender men, and 33.1% (707,100) non-binary.

The Social Security Administration has tracked the sex of US citizens since 1936. A 1968 estimate, by Ira B. Pauly, estimated that about 2,500 transsexual people were living in the United States, with four times as many trans women as trans men. One effort to quantify the modern population in 2011 gave a "rough estimate" that 0.3% of adults in the US are transgender. In 2016, studies estimated the proportion of Americans who identify as transgender at 0.5 to 0.6%.

In the United States and Canada, some Native American and First Nations cultures traditionally recognize the existence of more than two genders, such as the Zuni male-bodied lhamana, the Lakota male-bodied winkte, and the Mohave male-bodied alyhaa and female-bodied hwamee. These traditional people, along with those from other North American Indigenous cultures, are sometimes part of the contemporary, pan-Indian two-spirit community. Historically, in most cultures who have alternate gender roles, if the spouse of a third gender person is not otherwise gender variant, they have not generally been regarded as other-gendered themselves, simply for being in a same-sex relationship. In Mexico, the Zapotec culture includes a third gender in the form of the Muxe. Mahu is a traditional third gender in Hawaiʻi and Tahiti. Mahu are valued as teachers, caretakers of culture, and healers, such as Kapaemahu. Diné (Navajo) have Nádleehi.

=== Latin America ===
In Latin American cultures, a travesti is an individual who has been assigned male at birth and who has a feminine, transfeminine, or "femme" gender identity. Travestis generally undergo hormonal treatment, use female gender expression including new names and pronouns from the masculine ones they were given when assigned a sex, and might use breast implants, but they are not offered or do not desire sex-reassignment surgery. Travesti might be regarded as a gender in itself (a "third gender"), a mix between man and woman ("intergender/androgynes"), or the presence of both masculine and feminine identities in a single person ("bigender"); they are framed as something entirely separate from transgender women.

Other transgender identities are becoming more widely known, as a result of contact with other cultures of the Western world. These newer identities, sometimes known under the umbrella use of the term "genderqueer", along with the older travesti term, are known as non-binary and go along with binary transgender identities (those traditionally diagnosed under the obsolete label of "transsexualism") under the single umbrella of transgender, but are distinguished from cross-dressers and drag queens and kings, that are held as nonconforming gender expressions rather than transgender gender identities when a distinction is made.

=== Oceania ===
The 2021 Australian Census released by the Australian Bureau of Statistics estimated that 178,900 Australians (0.9% of the population) aged 16 years and over reported a gender that is different to their sex recorded at birth. They estimated that 67,100 people reported are trans men, 52,500 are trans women and 58,500 are non-binary people. People aged 16–24 years were more likely than any other age group to be trans and gender diverse (1.8%).

On the 2023 New Zealand Census, 26,097 people self-identified as transgender, defined by Stats NZ as someone whose gender identity does not match their sex recorded at birth. This is 0.7 percent of all census-takers who were 15 years of age and older and usually residents of the country.

== Culture ==
=== Coming out ===
Coming out is the process of sharing one's identity with others, and can include sharing new pronouns and a new name. Individuals who have come out are known as out. The experience of coming out can change depending on whether the transgender individual is perceived as the gender with which they identify, which is known as passing. In certain environments, some passing transgender individuals can choose to be stealth, which means to deliberately avoid coming out, often to avoid transphobia; these individuals are often out in other environments. The decision for transgender people to come out to current or potential romantic or sexual partners can be especially difficult.

The decision to come out is based on navigating others' gender expectations, reactions, and the threat of violence. Coming out is not a 'one-and-done' decision; rather, individuals make ongoing strategic decisions about their gender enactment and identity disclosure based on social contexts.

The age at which transgender people come out can vary; some transgender individuals will know about and share their identities at a young age, while for others, the process is longer or more complicated. Different transgender individuals choose to come out at different times during the transition process and to different people. Some transgender individuals will choose to come out as bisexual, lesbian, or gay before recognizing their gender identity or choosing to come out as transgender. Although there are some similarities, coming out as transgender is different than coming out as a sexual minority, such as lesbian, gay, or bisexual. This is partly due to the relatively lower level of information that people have about transgender people compared to people who are sexual minorities. Some come out in an online identity first, providing an opportunity to go through experiences virtually and safely before risking social implications in the real world.

It may take time for people to understand and respond when a transgender person comes out. Most transgender people feel healthier and happier when they come out and their gender identity is validated by others.

Some transgender people choose not to come out at all. For some, this decision can be because of stigma, lack of knowledge, or fear of rejection by friends and family. Upon coming out, transgender people can face discrimination, rejection, and violence. These risks are heightened when transgender individuals are members of other marginalized communities.

=== Visibility ===
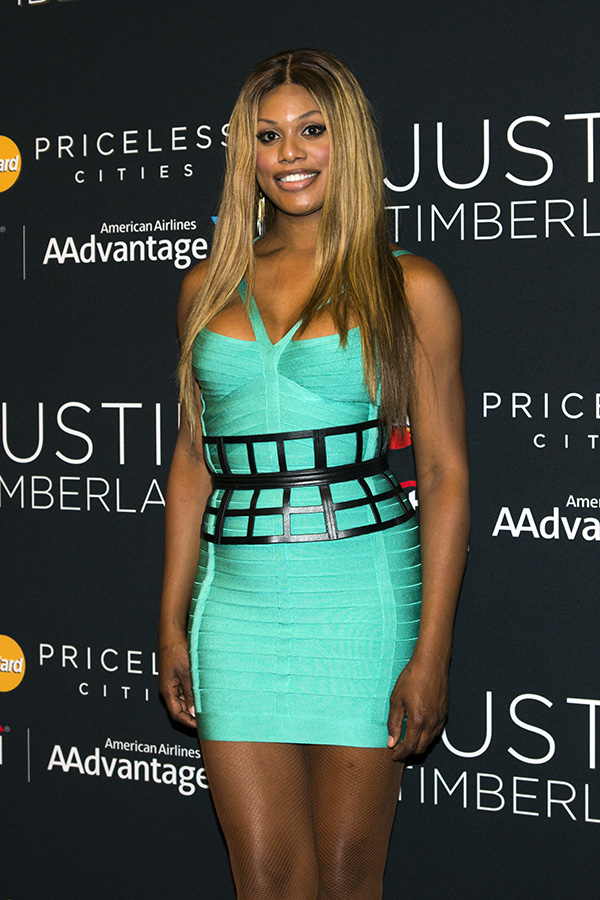
Actress Laverne Cox, who is trans, in 2014

In 2014, the United States reached a "transgender tipping point", according to Time. At this time, the media visibility of transgender people reached a level higher than seen before. Since then, the number of transgender portrayals across TV platforms has stayed elevated. Annual marches, protests or gatherings take place around the world for transgender issues, often taking place during the time of local Pride parades for LGBTQ people. These events are frequently organised by trans communities to build community, address human rights struggles, and create visibility. International Transgender Day of Visibility is an annual holiday occurring on March 31 dedicated to celebrating transgender people and raising awareness of discrimination faced by transgender people worldwide. The holiday was founded by Michigan-based transgender activist Rachel Crandall Crocker in 2009.

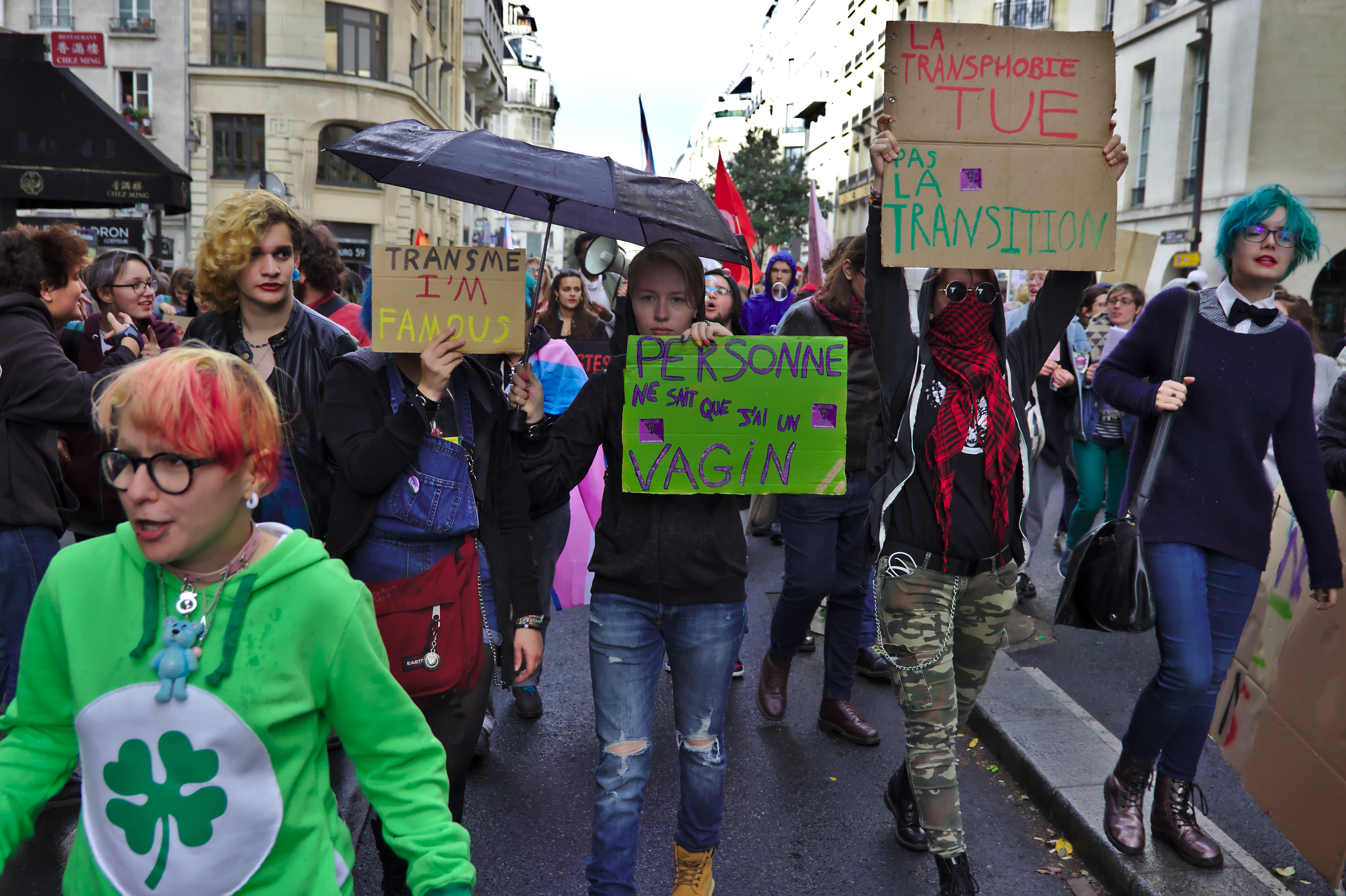
A 2017 trans march called "Existrans"

Transgender Day of Remembrance (TDOR) is held every year on November 20 in honor of Rita Hester, who was killed on November 28, 1998. Her murder remains unsolved, but was described in 2022 as "a result of transphobia and anti-trans violence" by the Office of the Mayor of Boston, Michelle Wu. TDOR memorializes victims of hate crimes and prejudice and raises awareness of hate crimes committed upon living transgender people. Transgender Awareness Week is a one-week celebration leading up to TDOR, dedicated to educating about transgender and gender non-conforming people and the issues associated with their transition or identity. Several trans marches occur in cities around the world, including Paris, San Francisco, and Toronto, in order to raise awareness of the transgender community. There are also significant portrayals of transgender people in the media. Transgender literature includes literature portraying transgender people, as well as memoirs or novels by transgender people, who often discuss elements of the transgender experience. Several films and television shows feature transgender characters in the storyline, and several fictional works also have notable transgender characters.

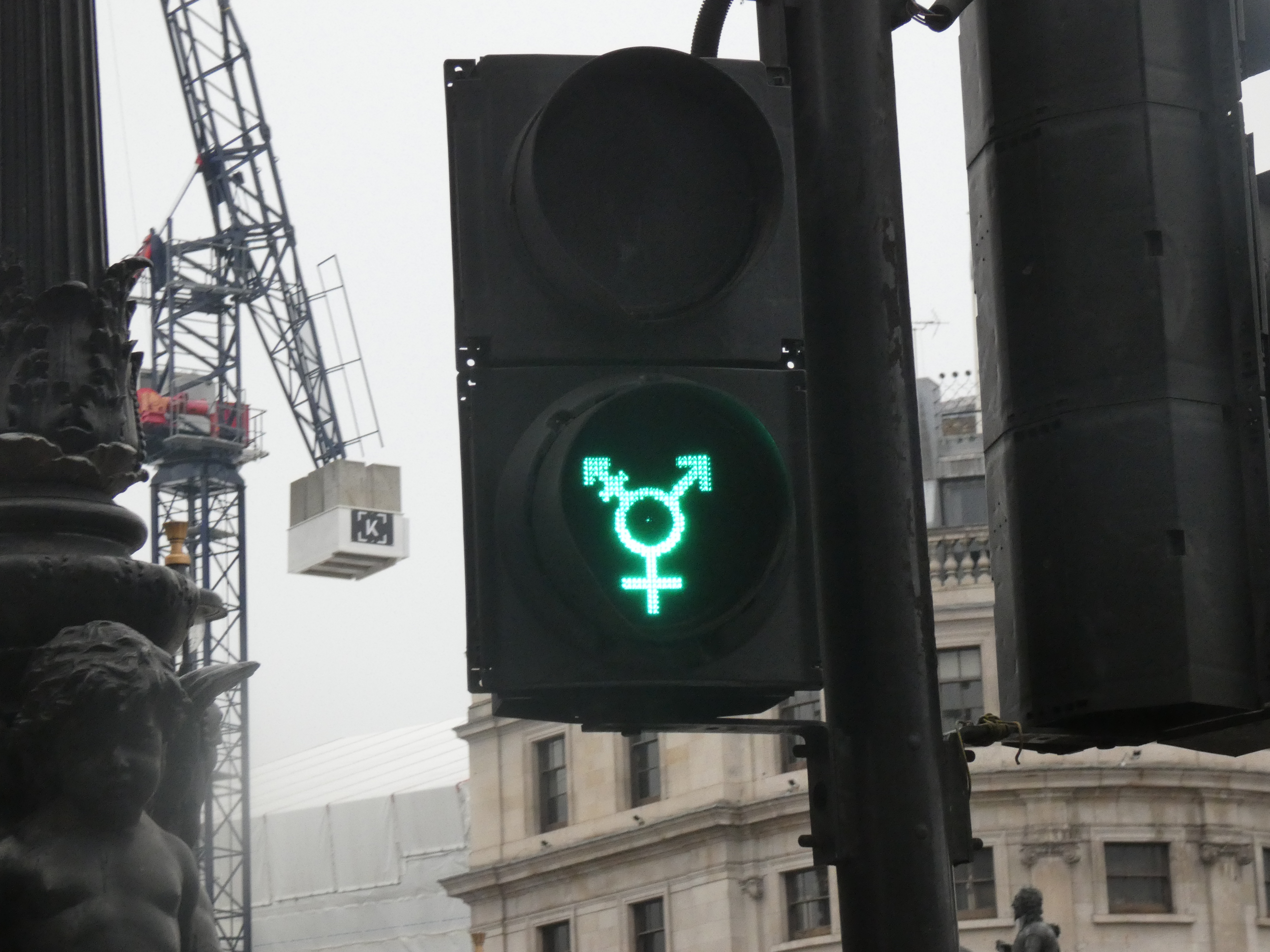
A pedestrian traffic light in Trafalgar Square, London with the ⚧ symbol, installed for the 2016 Pride in London

=== Pride symbols ===
A common symbol for the transgender community is the Transgender Pride Flag, which was designed by the American transgender woman Monica Helms in 1999, and was first shown at a pride parade in Phoenix, Arizona, in 2000. The flag consists of five horizontal stripes: light blue, pink, white, pink, and light blue. Other transgender symbols include the butterfly (symbolizing transformation or metamorphosis) and a pink/light blue yin and yang symbol. Several gender symbols have been used to represent transgender people, including U+26A5 ⚥ MALE AND FEMALE SIGN and U+26A7 ⚧ MALE WITH STROKE AND MALE AND FEMALE SIGN.

== See also ==
- List of fictional trans characters
- List of transgender people
- List of transgender publications
- List of transgender-rights organizations
- List of people killed for being transgender
- Outline of transgender topics
- Transgender culture of New York City
- Transgender history
