= Sipiniq =

Third-gender person in Inuit culture

In Inuit culture, sipiniq (Inuktitut: ᓯᐱᓂᖅ; West Greenlandic: sipineq, from sipi meaning "to split", plural sipiniit) refers to a person who is believed to have changed their physical sex as an infant, but whose gender is typically designated as being the same as their perceived original sex. In some ways, being sipiniq can be considered a third gender. In Inuit Nunaat this concept is primarily attested in areas of the Canadian Arctic, such as Igloolik and Nunavik, as well in Greenland such as Kitaamiut Inuit and Inughuit, though Iiviit used the words tikkaliaq and nuliakaaliaq. The Netsilik Inuit used the word kipijuituq for a similar concept.

== Birth ==
The change of sex could occur as a fetus while still in the womb, or at the moment of birth. For example, a newborn infant might be perceived as having a penis and testicles that "split open" at the moment of birth to become a vagina and labia. That infant would be socially designated as being male despite possessing sex organs usually perceived as female. In a more complex example of a sex change that occurred before birth, one Inuk woman described having memories of being the soul of her own deceased maternal grandfather, who entered her own mother's uterus and became a male fetus. When the time came for birth, the fetus rejected being born male and was born physically as a female.

Fieldwork conducted in the 1970s indicated that two-thirds of sipiniit were male infants who had become female, and were then designated as male (the reverse could occur, albeit more rarely). Long and difficult births were often attributed to sipiniit infants. Other physical signs that an infant was sipiniq include genital ambiguity (ranging from swelling due to edema to genitals with intersex features) and genitals blocked by mucus at birth.

== Socialization ==
A sipiniq person was regarded socially as a member of their designated gender, in a process that has been termed "reverse socialization". They would be named after a deceased relative of the designated gender, learn skills and perform work associated with that gender, and wear traditional clothing tailored for that gender's tasks. An individual was usually treated as sipiniq until puberty, but in some cases they retained the role into adulthood and even after marriage. Sipiniit were considered to be strong intermediaries between the natural and spiritual worlds, making them prime candidates for taking on the role of an angakkuq, or shaman. Many sipiniit married other sipiniit, but they could also marry cisgender individuals – being sipiniit reflected a gender role and not a sexuality. Some Inuit reported a belief that women who were or had been sipiniit would give birth to sipiniit children themselves.

== Anthropological perspectives ==
French anthropologist Bernard Saladin d'Anglure was responsible for much of the early scholarly research into sipiniit, beginning in the late 1970s. He used the term "perinatal transsexuality" to describe the concept of a gender transition that could happen in the womb or at the moment of birth. He noted that the Inuit had an increased rate of female pseudohermaphroditism, which may have contributed to the origin of the concept of sipiniit. However, he also noted that it did not account for all or even most cases of sipiniit people, as most female pseudohermaphrodites were sterile, but most sipiniit were not.

Some researchers have attempted to find demographic, economic, or psychological reasons for the designation of a child as sipiniq. It has been argued that sipiniq arose in order to help even out the sex ratio in families which only had children of a single gender. Saladin d'Anglure regarded such arguments as "impoverish[ing] the Inuit reality," and argued that reverse socialization among the Inuit originated from an underlying family ideal that reflected the balanced order of the universe in microcosm. The ideal Inuit family consisted of a "male-female couple (spouses) and a brother-sister pair". When the family unit did not accord with the ideological ideal, the family would employ reverse socialization or sipiniq designation of a newborn to restore balance.

Canadian anthropologist Betty Kobayashi Issenman regarded the designation of a child as a sipiniq to be a spiritual practice whereby the child incorporated the spirit of the deceased relative, rather than an expression of the child being transgender.
