= Nádleehi =

Diné (Navajo) gender role

Nádleehi is a social and, at times, ceremonial role in Diné (Navajo) culture – an "effeminate male" or "male-bodied person with a feminine nature". However, the nádleehi gender role is also fluid and cannot be simply described in terms of rigid gender binaries. Some Diné people recognize four general places on the gender spectrum: feminine woman, masculine woman, feminine man, and masculine man. Nádleehi may express their gender differently from day to day, or during different periods over their lifetimes, fulfilling roles in community and ceremony traditionally held by either women or men. At times, some may hold positions that can only be held by people who are near the middle of the gender spectrum. Contemporary nádleehi may or may not participate in the modern, pan-Indian two-spirit or LGBT communities. Notable people who were recognized by their communities as nádleehi are traditional weaver and ceremonial singer Hosteen Klah (1867–1937) and Fred Martinez, who was murdered at the age of 16 in June 2001.

== History ==
In Navajo society, where gender was understood in various ways than a simple male-female distinction, is where the Nadleehi role had started. The ability for Nadleehi individuals to transition between traditionally male and female activities was seen as normal in Navajo culture. As weavers, medicine people, and ritual leaders, Nádleehi people frequently had important spiritual roles. It was valuable to their communities due to their awareness of both masculine and feminine perspectives. An example is Hosteen Klah, a renowned healer and weaver whose Nádleehi status allowed them to combine their imaginative weaving skills with knowledge of ceremonies of faith. The value of this identity was highlighted in traditional Navajo teachings. The importance of this identity to Navajo spirituality and culture is shown by the fact that Indigenous legends say that the first man and woman were twins which were both Nádleehi.

== Role ==
Traditionally, a nádleehi person is recognized at a young age by the ceremonial elders and their own family, as they are seen instinctively taking on what are typically female roles in that society, as well as the clothing and work usually associated with females in that culture. As they mature they usually also find themselves sexually attracted to other males, and this is usually accepted by the community. A nádleehi's role in life might be somewhat fluid depending on context, such as when with different groups of people or in different cultural contexts. The nádleehi social and ceremonial role differs from other two-spirit roles in that it is specific to Diné culture and communities; other Nations that have roles for two-spirits – if they have them at all – have names in their own languages, and roles and other details tend to be specific to those particular cultures.

The difference in Diné perception of gender-nonconforming individuals and western perception was noted as early as the 1920s. A contemporary writer noted that while in American society gender-nonconformity was cause for anxiety, in Diné society it was seen as good fortune.

== Fred Martinez ==
Fred Martinez lived in Cortez, Colorado, on a Diné reservation, with his mother Pauline Mitchell. Friends of Martinez said that he was often harassed in school by their peers, for his feminine nature. Martinez's mother was supportive of her son and his friends, a number of whom were also gender nonconforming or LGBT. Diné society is traditionally matrilineal, with honored social and ceremonial roles for certain gender-variant members of the community, and Martinez's mother, grandmother, and others in the community recognized and accepted him as nádleehi.

Martinez was murdered by Shaun Murphey in June 2001, and it was determined that Murphey's motives were linked to Martinez's nádleehi status. Murphey was arrested and sentenced, though it was not ruled as a hate crime. A documentary about Martinez's case, Two-Spirits, explores both his life and the nádleehi role in traditional Diné culture.

== Modern times ==
Among Navajo tribes today, the Nádhleehi identity is still recognized and valued, An important turning point in openly embracing LGBTQ identities, especially those who identify as Nadleehi, came about in June 2019 when the Navajo Nation held its first Dine Pride event in Window Rock, Arizona. The event raised awareness to the reclamation of Traditional Dine teachings about gender diversity after years of shame and pressure from the West. For many generations, Nádleehi traditions and identities were eradicated due to colonial pressures, such as forced integration laws and missionary influences. This led to shame and concealment regarding gender-diverse identities within Native communities. Many Indigenous people were shut off from their traditional gender teachings as an outcome of this cultural erasure. Community leaders have mentioned how important it is with reconnecting with traditional knowledge about gender. The Dine people have always acknowledged and valued LGBTQ identities rather than perceiving them through a Western gender binary viewpoint, they regard them as sacred within their communities and leadership. An attempt to honor and reclaim ancestral values which were suppressed during colonialism appears within this modern celebration

=== Two-spirit identity ===
Indigenous people use the expression "two-spirit" to describe gender identities which are culturally and spiritually special and have been widely acknowledged by Native American nations for a long time. The Indigenous community created the word in 1990 as an effort to reclaim traditional conventional ideas of gender diversity and distance themselves from non-Native languages. Within multi-gender societies Two-Spirit individuals were seen to hold an exceptional position and often fulfill highly regarded social and ceremonial tasks. This wider frame of Two-Spirit identities prevalent by Indigenous nations includes Nádleehi. Each tribe understands that gender is more complex than a Western binary arrangement, although they use many terms and have different cultural meanings. Opposition to colonial attempts to wipe out Indigenous cultural and spiritual customs is seen in the reemergence of terms like Nádleehi and Two-Spirit.

== See also ==
- Gender roles among the Indigenous peoples of North America
- Gender system
- Hosteen Klah
- Third gender
