= Hosteen Klah =

Navajo artist, medicine person, and weaver

- Hosteen Klah in middle age.
- Born: Hastiin Tłʼa; 1867; Bear Mountain, near Fort Wingate, New Mexico
- Died: February 27, 1937 (aged 69–70)
- Known for: Weaver, artist and medicine person (chanting and sandpainting)
- Movement: Founded the Wheelwright Museum of the American Indian with Mary Cabot Wheelwright

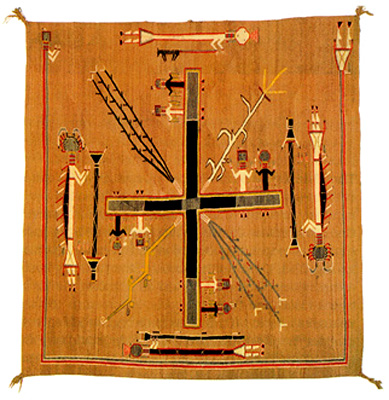
A weaving based on a Whirling Log ceremony sand painting by Klah, circa 1925.

Hosteen Klah (Navajo: Hastiin Tłʼa, 1867– February 27, 1937) was a Navajo artist, medicine person, and ceremonial practitioner. Known for combining traditional Navajo weaving with sacred sandpainting imagery, Klah played a significant role in preserving and documenting different aspects of Navajo religion and culture. As a nádleehi, a gender role recognized within Navajo society, Klah occupied both masculine and feminine social and ceremonial roles.

== Background ==
Hosteen (spelled "Hastiin" in the Navajo language) Klah was born in 1867 in the Tunicha Valley of what is now New Mexico, to parents Hoksay Nolyae and Ahson Tsosie. The name "Klah" referred to being left-handed. Klah did not attend government-run residential schools and instead received traditional spiritual training from their uncle, a medicine man.

By age ten, Klah had memorized and could perform an entire Navajo healing ceremony. These ceremonies often involved dancing, chanting, singing, and sandpainting—the practice of creating sacred, temporary images using colored sand and other natural materials.

== Gender Identity ==
Klah was widely recognized as a nádleehi, a Navajo gender category describing individuals who embody both male and female roles. In Klah’s case, this included serving as both a ceremonial singer (a role typically associated with men) and a master weaver (typically associated with women).

Most nádleehi individuals at the time were assigned male at birth, though some may have been intersex. While many nádleehi wore women's clothing, Klah reportedly did not. Klah never married and was not known to have had relationships with women, though specifics about their personal life remain limited.

== Weaving and Artistry ==
Klah mastered several traditional Navajo art forms, particularly weaving and sandpainting. They wove their first major textile at the 1892–1893 World's Columbian Exposition in Chicago, where they may also have participated in a sandpainting demonstration.

Around 1914, Klah began incorporating sacred ceremonial imagery—such as figures from the Yéʼii bicheii dance—into woven textiles. By 1919, they completed their first weaving based explicitly on sandpainting designs. This practice was controversial within parts of the Navajo community, as sandpainting imagery is traditionally meant to be impermanent. Despite the controversy, Klah’s innovative approach attracted attention from collectors and anthropologists.

In 1934, Klah demonstrated sandpainting publicly at the Century of Progress Exposition in Chicago, an event attended by President Franklin D. Roosevelt.

Before their death, Klah passed on weaving knowledge and ceremonial imagery to two nieces, ensuring the continuity of their techniques and artistic legacy.

== Wheelwright Museum ==
In 1921, Klah met Mary Cabot Wheelwright, a Boston heiress and anthropologist. Together, they founded what would become the Wheelwright Museum of the American Indian in Santa Fe, New Mexico. Concerned about the erosion of traditional Navajo religion due to missionary and governmental assimilation policies, Klah sought to preserve ceremonial knowledge for future generations.

Originally named the Navajo House of Prayer and House of Navajo Religion, the institution was later renamed the Museum of Navajo Ceremonial Art. In 1977, it adopted its current name, the Wheelwright Museum, after repatriating sensitive ceremonial materials to the Navajo Nation.

In 1942, the museum published Navajo Creation Myth – The Story of the Emergence by Hosteen Klah, as recorded by Mary C. Wheelwright.

== Death ==
Hosteen Klah died on February 27, 1937, from pneumonia, and was buried on the grounds of the Wheelwright Museum.

== See also ==
- Navajo rug
- Navajo way
- Wheelwright Museum of the American Indian
