= Winkte =

Men with feminine behavior in Lakota culture

- Winkte or wíŋkte
- Used by: Lakota people

Winkte (also spelled wíŋkte) is the contraction of an old Lakota word, winyanktehca, meaning 'wants to be like a woman'. Historically, the winkte have in some cases been considered a social category of male-bodied individuals who adopt the clothing, work, and mannerisms that Lakota culture usually considers feminine. However, in contemporary Lakota culture, winkte is usually used to refer to a homosexual man, regardless of whether that man is in other ways gender non-conforming. Contemporary winkte may or may not consider themselves part of the more mainstream gay, LGBTQ, or pan-Indian two-spirit communities. Historically, sometimes the direction to adopt the social and spiritual aspects of this role has come in a series of dreams.

While historical accounts of their status vary, most accounts treated the winkte as regular members of the community, and not in any way marginalized for their status. Other accounts held the winkte as sacred, occupying a liminal, third-gender role in the culture, and born to fulfill ceremonial roles that could not be filled by either men or women. In contemporary Lakota communities, attitudes toward the winkte vary from accepting to homophobic.

== Etymology ==
Sihasapa and Minneconjou Lakotan anthropologist Beatrice Medicine writes:

In my childhood, we were aware of this social category, which was referred to as winkte. Linguistic analysis of this Lakota word is:

win – "woman"
kte – "to be like"
kte – "to kill" (a deeper structural form)
"The common vernacular usage was winkte "wants to be like a woman."

We, as children, were instructed, "There are these individuals – in all cases males (wicasa). They are different. They are winkte. Don't make fun of them. They are also Lakota," said our parents and grandparents.
