= CCGS Naalak Nappaaluk =

Canadian Coast Guard research vessel

Class overview
- Operators: Canadian Coast Guard
- Preceded by: CCGS Hudson
- Cost: CAD$1.28 billion
- Built: 2022–2025
- Planned: 1
- Completed: 1

History

Canada
- Name: Naalak Nappaaluk
- Namesake: Naalak Nappaaluk, Inuk elder
- Port of registry: Ottawa
- Ordered: November 2015
- Builder: Vancouver Shipyards, North Vancouver
- Laid down: 25 November 2022
- Launched: 17 August 2024
- Status: Delivered

General characteristics
- Type: Offshore oceanographic science vessel
- Displacement: 5,058 t (4,978 long tons)
- Length: 87.9 m (288 ft 5 in) oa
- Beam: 17.6 m (57 ft 9 in)
- Ice class: Polar Class 6
- Speed: 13.4 knots (24.8 km/h; 15.4 mph)
- Range: 12,719 nmi (23,556 km; 14,637 mi)
- Crew: 34 + 26 scientists

CCGS Naalak Nappaaluk (Note: CCGS stands for Canadian Coast Guard Ship) is an offshore oceanographic and hydrographic survey vessel for the Canadian Coast Guard. The vessel replaces CCGS Hudson. It is described as "Canada's new flagship ocean research ship".

Naalak Nappaaluk was initially expected to cost CAD$109 million, with delivery scheduled for 2017. However, the project's budget increased to CAD$1.28 billion, and delivery was delayed by eight years, pushing it to 2025.

The ship was launched at Vancouver, British Columbia, in August 2024. Sea trials were underway as of June 2025. It was formally delivered to the Canadian Coast Guard at a ceremony at Vancouver Shipyards on November 13, 2025. Crew training is scheduled to occur in Patricia Bay, after which the vessel is scheduled to work out of the Bedford Institute of Oceanography in Dartmouth, Nova Scotia.

== Description ==
The offshore oceanographic and hydrographic survey vessel is 87.9 metres (288 ft 5 in) long overall with a beam of 17.6 metres (57 ft 9 in). Naalak Nappaaluk is certified as Polar Class 6. The ship has a maximum speed of 13.4 knots (24.8 km/h; 15.4 mph) and a range of 12,719 nautical miles (23,556 km; 14,637 mi). The vessel will accommodate up to 34 crew and 26 Fisheries and Oceans Canada scientists. Naalak Nappaaluk is officially classed as an "offshore oceanographic science vessel" (OOSV) and is the largest dedicated science vessel in the Canadian Coast Guard fleet. The CBC described the ship as "Canada's new flagship ocean research ship".

== Construction and career ==
The ship was ordered from Vancouver Shipyards in North Vancouver, British Columbia as part of the National Shipbuilding Strategy in November 2015 as the replacement for the ageing research vessel CCGS Hudson. Initially, the research vessel was supposed to be built first and then the two ships of the Protecteur class. However, in early 2019, the construction order was re-organized, with the research vessel being built second after one of the Protecteur class. The vessel's keel laying took place on 25 November 2022 and the ship was launched on 17 August 2024. The vessel is named for Naalak Nappaaluk, "a respected Inuk Elder from Kangiqsujuaq, Nunavik [who] was committed to protecting and promoting Inuit language and culture."

The ship will be stationed at the Bedford Institute of Oceanography in Dartmouth, Nova Scotia. The vessel will primarily support scientific research missions such as oceanographic, geological and hydrographic surveys, as well as ongoing study into the impacts of climate change in the Atlantic Ocean and Gulf of St. Lawrence. The vessel will also be able to support search and rescue operations and environmental response as necessary.

Originally expected to cost CAD$109 million with delivery in 2017, the budget for the project has jumped more than tenfold to CAD$1.28 billion as of October 2023, or CAD$1.47 billion if taxes are included, with delivery being delayed to 2018, 2021, 2023, 2024 and finally 2025. A government spokesperson cited the cost increase as due to "impacts of COVID-19 to the shipyard, higher than anticipated inflation and global supply chain challenges, a more mature vessel design, and a better understanding of production and material costs."

== See also ==
- CFAV Quest - Survey vessel in the Royal Canadian Navy
