= Naalak Nappaaluk =

Naalak Nappaaluk (Inuktitut: ᓈᓚᒃ ᓇᑉᐹᓗᒃ; 1928 – June 8, 2010) was an Inuk elder and knowledge keeper from Kangiqsujuaq in Nunavik, in northern Quebec, Canada. He spent much of his life preserving and promoting Inuit Language, culture and traditional knowledge.

He was known for sharing skills such as navigation by stars, hunting techniques, storytelling and other ancestral skills. He was also a consultant, astronomer, newsman, navigator and meteorologist.

== Early life ==
Naalak Nappaaluk was born in the region near Kangiqsujuaq, Nunavik in 1928. He was named after his father, Naalaktuujaq, and his grandfather, Nappaaluk.

He was married to Mitiarjuk Nappaaluk, a respected elder, educator, author and recipient of the Order of Canada, who died in 2007. The couple had five children and also helped raise several other children and grandchildren.

== Cultural leadership and knowledge ==
=== Knowledge Keeper ===
Nappaaluk became a knowledge keeper and cultural leader in Nunavik. He worked closely with Inuit organizations for decades, most notably the Avataq Cultural Institute (Nunavik’s cultural preservation organization) and Inuit communication groups such as Taqramiut Nipingat. He knew traditional Inuit songs (ajaaja) and skills for coping with Arctic wildlife, including how to avoid polar bears. He served as a consultant and instructor for multi-media and teacher-training programs, generously sharing his extensive knowledge of traditional practices.

He taught the specific Inuktitut vocabulary for hunting, travelling and surviving on the land, and devoted his life to preserving and promoting Inuit language, culture, and traditional knowledge, so that traditional language and ancestral knowledge could be preserved and passed on.

=== Bowhead Whale Hunt ===
Nappaaluk played a key role in cultural revitalization efforts. When Inuit leaders in Nunavik sought to resume the traditional bowhead whale hunt, he was a leader in that effort. Bowhead hunting had been banned since before his birth in 1928, but after decades of advocacy a limited hunt was approved and proceeded in 2008. In August 2008, the then-elderly Nappaaluk greeted the returning hunters and participated in the community celebration, eating bowhead maktaaq (whale blubber) as had not been practiced for decades.

== Legacy and honours ==
Nappaaluk died June 8 in Kuujjuaq, where he had been a resident at the Tusaajiapik elders home.

In recognition of his lifetime of service, the Canadian Coast Guard named its new flagship offshore science vessel CCGS Naalak Nappaaluk in his honour. The vessel’s name was chosen in consultation with Inuit leaders and is intended to celebrate Nappaaluk’s contributions to preserving and promoting Inuit language, culture and traditional knowledge. Naalak’s son, Lukasi Nappaaluk, spoke during the ceremony and Naalak’s daughter, Qiallak, christened the vessel as the ship’s sponsor.
