= Mac OS Inuit =

Single-byte character encoding for Canadian syllabics used in the Inuktitut language

- Alias(es): Mac OS Inuktitut, InuitSCII
- Language(s): Inuktitut syllabics
- Created by: Doug Hitch for the Northwest Territories government
- Current status: Authorised (but not actively supported) by Apple, and included in their legacy encoding converter data
- Classification: Extended ASCII
- Extends: US-ASCII

Mac OS Inuit, also called Mac OS Inuktitut or InuitSCII, is an 8-bit, single byte, extended ASCII character encoding supporting the variant of Canadian Aboriginal syllabics used by the Inuktitut language. It was designed by Doug Hitch for the government of the Northwest Territories, and adopted by Michael Everson for his fonts.

Mac OS Inuit is used by the Inuktitut localisation of the classic Mac OS, which was overseen by the Baffin Bay Divisional Board of Education with support from Everson Gunn Teoranta and authorised by Apple, although it did not ship with Apple hardware.

== Layout ==
Each character is shown with its equivalent Unicode code point. Only the second half of the table (code points 128–255) is shown, the first half (code points 0–127) being the same as ASCII.

Mac OS Inuit / Mac OS Inuktitut
	0	1	2	3	4	5	6	7	8	9	A	B	C	D	E	F
8x	ᐃ 1403	ᐄ 1404	ᐅ 1405	ᐆ 1406	ᐊ 140A	ᐋ 140B	ᐱ 1431	ᐲ 1432	ᐳ 1433	ᐴ 1434	ᐸ 1438	ᐹ 1439	ᑉ 1449	ᑎ 144E	ᑏ 144F	ᑐ 1450
9x	ᑑ 1451	ᑕ 1455	ᑖ 1456	ᑦ 1466	ᑭ 146D	ᑮ 146E	ᑯ 146F	ᑰ 1470	ᑲ 1472	ᑳ 1473	ᒃ 1483	ᒋ 148B	ᒌ 148C	ᒍ 148D	ᒎ 148E	ᒐ 1490
Ax	ᒑ 1491	° 00B0	ᒡ 14A1	ᒥ 14A5	ᒦ 14A6	• 2022	¶ 00B6	ᒧ 14A7	® 00AE	©	™ 2122	ᒨ 14A8	ᒪ 14AA	ᒫ 14AB	ᒻ 14BB	ᓂ 14C2
Bx	ᓃ 14C3	ᓄ 14C4	ᓅ 14C5	ᓇ 14C7	ᓈ 14C8	ᓐ 14D0	ᓯ 14EF	ᓰ 14F0	ᓱ 14F1	ᓲ 14F2	ᓴ 14F4	ᓵ 14F5	ᔅ 1505	ᓕ 14D5	ᓖ 14D6	ᓗ 14D7
Cx	ᓘ 14D8	ᓚ 14DA	ᓛ 14DB	ᓪ 14EA	ᔨ 1528	ᔩ 1529	ᔪ 152A	ᔫ 152B	ᔭ 152D	… 2026	NBSP; 00A0	ᔮ 152E	ᔾ 153E	ᕕ 1555	ᕖ 1556	ᕗ 1557
Dx	– 2013	— 2014	“ 201C	” 201D	‘ 2018	’ 2019	ᕘ 1558	ᕙ 1559	ᕚ 155A	ᕝ 155D	ᕆ 1546	ᕇ 1547	ᕈ 1548	ᕉ 1549	ᕋ 154B	ᕌ 154C
Ex	ᕐ 1550	ᕿ 157F	ᖀ 1580	ᖁ 1581	ᖂ 1582	ᖃ 1583	ᖄ 1584	ᖅ 1585	ᖏ 158F	ᖐ 1590	ᖑ 1591	ᖒ 1592	ᖓ 1593	ᖔ 1594	ᖕ 1595	ᙱ 1671
Fx	ᙲ 1672	ᙳ 1673	ᙴ 1674	ᙵ 1675	ᙶ 1676	ᖖ 1596	ᖠ 15A0	ᖡ 15A1	ᖢ 15A2	ᖣ 15A3	ᖤ 15A4	ᖥ 15A5	ᖦ 15A6	ᕼ 157C	Ł 0141	ł 0142
