= Qajartalik =

Petroglyph site on Qikertaaluk Island, Nunavut, Canada

- JhEv-1
- Petroglyphs at Qajartalik

- A map of Nunavut showing the Qajartalik petroglyph site
- 61°19′53.6664″N 71°29′58.7184″W
- Type: Petroglyph
- Cultures: Dorset culture
- Location: Qikertaaluk Island, Nunavut, Canada

Qajartalik (Inuktitut for "where there is a kayak") is a petroglyph site located on the Qajartalik peninsula of Qikertaaluk Island, Nunavut, approximately 40 km southeast of Kangiqsujuaq, Quebec. The site consists of over 150 carvings of faces in soapstone. It was created by the Dorset people, the culture who inhabited the Canadian eastern Arctic and Greenland beginning approximately 2,200 years ago before disappearing approximately 1,000 years ago, and who inhabited the region prior to the Thule Inuit who arrived approximately 800 years ago. It is believed to be the northernmost rock art site in North America and is considered to be one of a kind. The site is currently on Canada's tentative list of sites proposed for inscription on the UNESCO World Heritage List.

== Site ==
The site is located 50 metres from the shoreline and is 15 metres above sea level. The site is approximately 130 metres long, roughly forming the shape of a trough, and contains several formations of soapstone in which the petroglyphs were carved. In addition to being used for carving petroglyphs, the site was also used by the Dorset as a quarry for the creation of items such as qulliq oil lamps and containers. Later, the Thule and Inuit also used the site as a quarry for the creation of items such as oil lamps and cooking pots, as well as for a source of raw materials for sculptures. Over 150 soapstone extraction zones have been identified at the site. Although the Thule and Inuit also used the site as a quarry, only the Dorset carved petroglyphs there. As the site has not been scientifically dated, it is not entirely clear when the petroglyphs were created or when the site was first quarried.

Most of the petroglyphs depict human faces, but some represent animal faces. Additionally, some of the petroglyph faces appear to have both human and animal features. Some surfaces at the site only have a single engraving, while many others have groups of ten or more faces, not necessarily having a consistent orientation relative to one another. The faces range in size from 2-3 centimetres to more than 70 centimetres. The smaller engravings were made by incision with sharp-edge tools, and the larger engraving were made by pecking and grooving using hammerstones.

Known for decades to the local Inuit population, the site was first documented by anthropologist Bernard Saladin d'Anglure in the 1960s, who learned of the site from Inuit hunters who would camp at Qikertaaluk Island. He initially identified 95 carvings at the site. Through casts he made of some of the carvings, he was able to identify them as being Dorset in origin. The site was visited and studied sporadically by archaeologists in the following years. In 1996, Avataq Cultural Institute did an extensive inventory of the site.

== Preservation ==
Since 1996, the Avataq Cultural Institute has been working to study and develop the site as well as plan for its protection. In 2006, it was discovered that some vandalism had been committed at the site, likely in the spring of that year. This event spurred calls for additional protection of the site.

On December 20, 2017, Environment Minister Catherine McKenna announced that Qajartalik was one of eight sites that would be added to Canada's tentative list of UNESCO World Heritage Sites, joining six sites already on the tentative list. Its nomination was officially submitted on April 13, 2018. The justification for inscription was based on criteria (iii), with Parks Canada stating that "The Qajartalik petroglyph site is a unique archaeological site in the Canadian Arctic, providing a tangible link to the cultural tradition of the Dorset people."
