= HMCS Cormorant (ASL 20) =

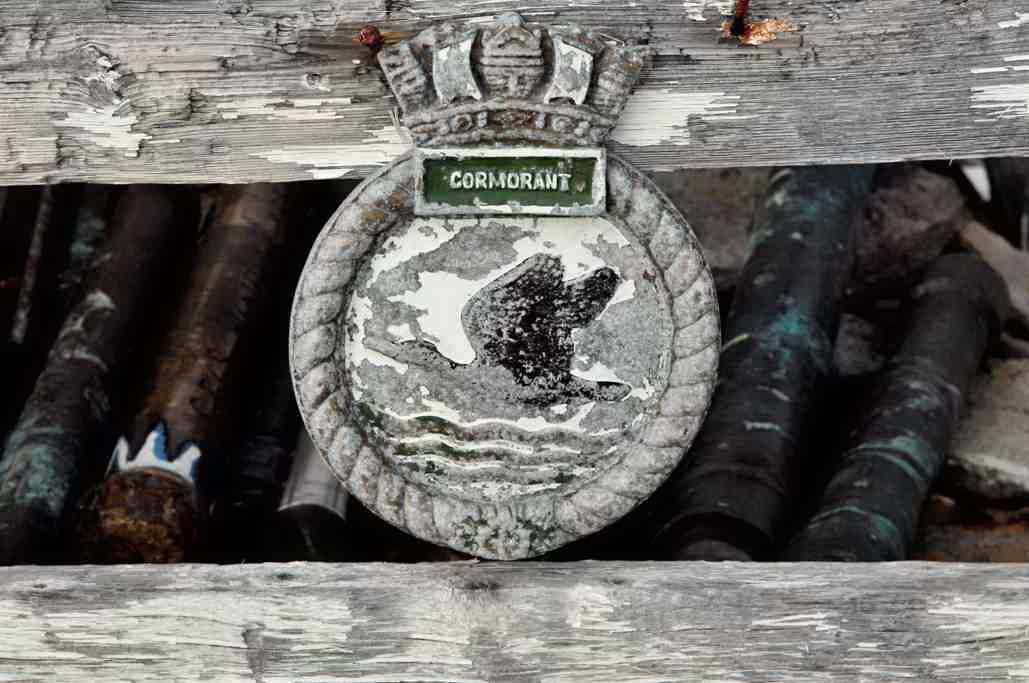
- The badge of Cormorant

History

Italy
- Name: Aspa Quarto
- Builder: Cantiere Navale Apuania, Marine-Carrara, Italy
- Laid down: 8 December 1963
- Launched: 11 April 1965
- Completed: 15 June 1965
- Out of service: 1975
- Identification: IMO number: 6516881
- Fate: Sold to Canadian Forces, 1975

Canada
- Name: Cormorant
- Acquired: July 1975
- Commissioned: 10 November 1978
- Decommissioned: 2 July 1997
- Stricken: 1997
- Identification: Pennant number: ASL 20; IMO number: 6516881
- Fate: Scrapped 2020
- Badge: Argent, a cormorant volant, wings elevated proper, in base, three barrulets undy vert.

General characteristics
- Type: Diving support vessel
- Displacement: 2,350 long tons (2,388 t)
- Length: 74.7 m (245 ft 1 in)
- Beam: 11.9 m (39 ft 1 in)
- Draught: 5.0 m (16 ft 5 in)
- Propulsion: 3 × Marelli-Deutz ACR 12456 EV diesel engines; Diesel-electric drive system, 1,800 hp (1,342 kW); 1 controllable pitch propeller
- Speed: 14 knots (26 km/h; 16 mph)
- Range: 13,000 nmi (24,076 km; 14,960 mi) at 12 knots (22 km/h; 14 mph)
- Complement: 65
- Sensors & processing systems: 2 × Decca 1229 navigational radar
- Notes: 2 × SD-1 submersibles in a heated hangar aft

HMCS Cormorant was a diving support vessel that served in the Canadian Forces. She was equipped with two SDL-1 submersibles. The ship was the first in the Canadian Forces to have women assigned to their crew. Initially constructed as the trawler Aspa Quarto in 1965, the ship was acquired by the Canadian Forces in 1975 and renamed Cormorant. The vessel remained in service until 1997 when Cormorant was sold to a US buyer. The ship was laid up at Bridgewater, Nova Scotia in 2000 and was removed on 18 November 2020 to be scrapped in Sheet Harbour.

== Description ==
As built, Aspa Quarto was a stern factory trawler that had a 1,643 gross register tons (GRT) and a 961 DWT. The ship was 74.4 metres (244 ft 1 in) long overall and 65.0 metres (213 ft 3 in) between perpendiculars with a beam of 12.2 metres (40 ft 0 in). The trawler was powered diesel-electric propulsion system turning one propeller giving the ship a maximum speed of 14 knots (26 km/h).

After conversion, Cormorant had a fully loaded displacement of 2,350 long tons (2,388 t). The vessel was 74.7 metres (245 ft 1 in) long overall, with a beam of 11.9 metres (39 ft 1 in) and a draught of 5.0 metres (16 ft 5 in). Cormorant was powered by three Marelli-Deutz ACR 12456 EV diesel engines as part of a diesel-electric drive system rated at 1,800 horsepower (1,342 kW). The engines drove one controllable pitch propeller, giving the ship a speed of 14 knots (26 km/h; 16 mph) and a range of 13,000 nautical miles (24,076 km; 14,960 mi) at 12 knots (22 km/h; 14 mph). The ship had a complement of 65 which increased to 74 with the introduction of female crew members in 1980. Cormorant carried two SD-1 submersibles in a heated hangar aft. The SD-1 submersibles were capable of operating at depths of 610 metres (2,000 ft) with a lock-out compartment for divers. The ship was equipped with two Decca 1229 navigational radars.

== Service history ==
The vessel was built as the Italian-owned stern trawler Aspa Quarto at Cantiere Navale Apuania, Marine-Carrara in Italy. Aspa Quarto was laid down on 8 December 1963, launched on 11 April 1965 and completed on 15 June 1965. She was purchased in July 1975 and taken to Davie Shipbuilding at Lauzon, Quebec where the ship underwent conversion to a diving support vessel. The ship was commissioned into Maritime Command on 10 November 1978 at Lauzon, becoming the second Canadian naval unit to bear this name.

In 1980, the first mixed gender crew trial took place aboard Cormorant in response to the recommendations of the Royal Commission on the Status of Women. The trial lasted until 1984. Among those serving on board during this trial was Louise Fish, acting as the supply officer.

Between 23 August and 5 October 1989, Cormorant and CFAV Quest conducted defence research as part of Operation Norploy 89, which took place in the Arctic region of Canada, mainly in Baffin Bay, Lancaster Sound and the Davis Strait. Using the submersible SDL-1 deployed from Cormorant, the sunken vessel Breadalbane was discovered, a ship not seen since its sinking in 1853.

Cormorant was an integral part of "Expedition '95", which recovered the ship's bell from the wreck of Edmund Fitzgerald in Lake Superior. During a ceremony at Sault Ste. Marie, Michigan, on 7 July 1995, family members of the lost crew rang the bell whenever their loved one's name was read, but if family were unavailable, volunteers from Cormorant performed the duty.

She was decommissioned on 2 July 1997 and sold to United States owners for diving operations. The ship underwent conversion to an offshore support vessel in 1998 however the ship was docked in Bridgewater, Nova Scotia in 2000 and has remained there. As of March 2015, the ship developed a severe list. As of 21 March 2015, the ship had sunk in the LaHave River due to the amount of ice on the deck. The Canadian Coast Guard took control of the salvage effort in May due to pollution concerns.

The ship was refloated with the list reduced to 8 degrees. Salvage was anticipated to be completed in another week. The ownership of the vessel remains unclear, with lawsuits claiming that a Texas-based company and the Port of Bridgewater own the ship, and therefore liable for the cleanup. The Port of Bridgewater claims that the vessel's sinking was due to sabotage and that the ship's thru-hull valves had been opened. The ship remained at laid up in Bridgewater, Nova Scotia due to the ongoing court case. In October 2020, RJ MacIsaac Construction of Antigonish, Nova Scotia was awarded the federal government tender to dispose of the ship. On 18 November 2020, the ex-Cormorant was towed out of Bridgwater Harbour for scrapping at Sheet Harbour. Demolition of the ship was declared completed on 7 July 2021.

The ship's bell of HMCS Cormorant is currently on loan to a Navy League Cadet Corps in British Columbia. The Christening Bells Project at Canadian Forces Base Esquimalt Naval and Military Museum includes information from the ship's bell of HMCS Cormorant, which was used for baptism of babies on board ship.
