= Mitiarjuk Nappaaluk =

Inuk writer (1931-2007)

Mitiarjuk Nappaaluk at the Nunavik Inuit Elders Conference in Tasiujaq in 1996.

Mitiarjuk Attasie Nappaaluk CM (Inuktitut: ᒥᑎᐊᕐᔪᒃ ᐊᑦᑕᓯ ᓇᑉᐹᓗᒃ; 1931 – April 30, 2007) was an Inuk author, educator, and sculptor from Kangiqsujuaq in Nunavik, in northern Quebec, Canada. She was noted for writing Sanaaq, one of the first Inuktitut-language novels. Nappaaluk translated books into Inuktitut and contributed to an early Inuktitut dictionary. She went on to teach Inuit culture and language in the Nunavik region, authoring a total of 22 books for use in schools. Her soapstone sculptures are held in collections at the Winnipeg Art Gallery, the Musée National des Beaux-Arts du Québec, the Musée de la Civilisation, and the British Museum.

For her efforts in supporting and preserving Inuit culture, Nappaaluk was recognized with a National Aboriginal Achievement Award (1999) and an honorary degree from McGill University (2000).

== Early life ==
Mitiarjuk Attasie Nappaaluk was born in 1931 in Kangiqsujuaq, Nunavik. Because she was the elder of two daughters – and had no brothers – she grew up learning both women's traditional work and skills more ordinarily taught to men, such as hunting caribou and seals. When her father was unwell, she often went on hunting trips alone to support the family.

As a young woman, Nappaaluk was well liked and highly regarded for her strong skills as a hunter, and when she was 16 she received several offers of courtship from men in local communities. She married Naalak Nappaaluk. Although Inuit custom dictated that the wife usually went to live with the husband's family, Naalak agreed to move in with Mitiarjuk's parents instead and become the family's main provider. The couple went on to have seven children.

== Writing and educational work ==
=== Sanaaq ===
In the early 1950s, Nappaaluk was approached by Catholic missionaries looking for help speaking better Inuktitut. In return, they showed her how to write using the Inuktitut syllabic system.

She agreed to begin writing down words and sentences for educational purposes, but soon began developing a longer story of her own, which eventually became the novel Sanaaq. Nappaaluk's novel follows the story of an Inuit family, describing their traditional ways of life while also exploring the changes effected when settlers and missionaries from the south arrive in the community. The manuscript was completed over the course of more than 20 years, the writing balanced alongside Nappaaluk's obligations as a parent and educator and interrupted twice by trips south for tuberculosis treatment. Anthropologist Bernard Saladin d'Anglure provided her with assistance and support in completing the novel and sharing it with a wider audience.

Sanaaq was finally published in Inuktitut syllabics in 1984, and quickly became a cultural touchstone in Inuit communities throughout the Canadian Arctic. A French translation of the novel was published in 2002, reaching bestseller status in Montreal, and an English edition was published in 2014. While Markoosie Patsauq's Inuktitut novel Harpoon of the Hunter appeared in print in 1970 before Sanaaq, Nappaaluk's novel (having begun development in the 1950s) is still credited with being the earliest novel written in Inuktitut syllabics in Canada.

=== Teaching and translation ===
In her early work with the missionaries, Nappaaluk translated the Roman Catholic Book of Prayer into Inuktitut, also translating a number of novels and works of literature. She contributed to a dictionary of Inuktitut and an encyclopedia of traditional Inuit knowledge and legends from the Nunavik region. Between 1965 and 1996, she worked as a school teacher in Nunavik and developed new materials to help Inuit students learn their traditional culture and language. She wrote a total of 22 books for use in schools, as well as creating annotated drawings to share legends and Inuktitut words. She served on Nunavik's Inuktitut Language Commission and was a consultant with the Kativik School Board. After retiring from her career as an educator, Nappaaluk stayed involved with the Community Council of Kangiqsujuaq. Her husband Naalak was also known as a dedicated promoter of Inuit cultural traditions.

In addition to her other pursuits, Nappaaluk was a carver of soapstone figures. She used the art form to explore Inuit culture and Christian religious narratives. Her sculptures are held in collections at the Winnipeg Art Gallery, the Musée National des Beaux-Arts du Québec, the Musée de la Civilisation, and the British Museum.

She died on April 30, 2007, following an illness.

== Awards and honours ==
Nappaaluk won a National Aboriginal Achievement Award in 1999, and received an honorary degree from McGill University in 2000. In 2001, her literary work was acknowledged and honoured by UNESCO at an international conference focused on Indigenous writers. Nappaaluk was named a Member of the Order of Canada in 2004.

After Sanaaq was translated and published in English, the book received the 2015 Mary Scorer Award for Best Book by a Manitoba Publisher, presented as part of the Manitoba Book Awards.
