= Iñupiaq Braille =

Braille alphabet of the Iñupiaq language

- Script type: alphabet
- Print basis: Iñupiaq alphabet
- Languages: Inupiat

Related scripts
- Parent systems: Braille: Iñupiaq Braille

Iñupiaq Braille is a braille alphabet of the Inupiat language maintained by the Alaskan Department of Education.

== Chart ==
The print digraphs ch and sr are digraphs in braille as well. The alphabet is,

a	ch		g	ġ	h	i	k	ḳ	l	ḷ	ł	ł̣	m
n	ñ	ŋ	p	q	r	s	sr		t	ṭ	u	v	y

⠻ for ñ is from Spanish Braille. ŋ and ṭ are the mirror-image of n and t. Ł is from English Braille th, the English sound which is closest to it. Ḳ and ṭ are only found in older texts. Punctuation is the same as in English Braille.

== See also ==
- Inuktitut Braille
