= Markoosie Patsauq =

Canadian Inuk writer (died 2020)

Markoosie Patsauq (ᒫᑯᓯ ᐸᑦᓴᐅᖅ; 1941 or 1942 – 2020) was a Canadian Inuk writer from Inukjuak (Nunavik, Québec). He is best known for Harpoon of the Hunter (ᐊᖑᓇᓱᑦᑎᐅᑉ ᓇᐅᒃᑯᑎᖓ), the first published Inuktitut language novel; the novel was written later, but published earlier (1970), than Mitiarjuk Nappaaluk's Sanaaq.

Born near Inukjuak, Quebec, his was one of the families forcibly relocated to Resolute, Northwest Territories in the High Arctic relocation in 1953. He later attended high school in Yellowknife.

Patsauq wrote the coming-of-age story Harpoon of the Hunter in 1969 when he worked as a pilot (the first Inuk pilot in Canada), using material he had heard from family members. It was serialized in the Inuit periodical Inuttituut before being published in an English translation in 1970. In Ukrainian, the story was first published in 1974 by the publishing house Veselka (Rainbow). A French translation was published in 2013, and translations into Hindi and Marathi followed in 2015. He also wrote short stories and non-fiction, although none of his other work became as known as Harpoon of the Hunter.

In 2016, scholar Valerie Henitiuk, was studying how the meaning of the original story written in Inuktitut may have changed when it was translated into English; subsequent translations were based on that English translation. Together with Marc-Antoine Mahieu (affiliated with NALCO), and in collaboration with Patsauq, Henitiuk in 2021 made the first full critical edition of Patsauq's 1969-70 Umarjursiutik unaatuinnamut as Hunter with Harpoon/Chasseur au Harpon.

He died in March 2020 at his home in Inukjuak.
