= Sanaaq =

Novel by Mitiarjuk Nappaaluk

- Author: Mitiarjuk Nappaaluk
- Original title: ᓴᓈᕐᒃ
- Translator: Peter Frost
- Language: Inuktitut
- Publisher: Association Inuksiutiit Katimajiit (Inuktitut), University of Manitoba Press (English)
- Publication date: 1984
- Publication place: Canada
- English publication date: 2014

Sanaaq is a 1984 novel by Mitiarjuk Nappaaluk, a Canadian Inuk educator and author from the Nunavik region in northern Quebec, Canada. The English edition of the novel was published in 2014 by the University of Manitoba Press in partnership with the Avataq Cultural Institute. It was translated into English from French by Peter Frost.

== Background ==
The first draft of Sanaaq was written in Inuktitut syllabics by Nappaaluk.

Many of the chapters, or "episodes", of the novel were originally written at the request of Catholic missionaries stationed in Nunavik who were interested in improving their own knowledge of Inuktitut in order to better communicate with local communities and translate prayer books into the Inuit language. Nappaaluk, who was asked to initially create a type of phrasebook using syllabics to record common words from everyday life, instead created a cast of characters and a series of short stories about their lives.

The novel took almost 20 years to complete. Between 1953 and 1956, Nappaaluk completed episodes 1-24 before leaving Nunavik and going to southern Canada to receive hospital treatment; upon her return, she wrote an additional 13 episodes until the missionary supervising her work was transferred to another community. In 1961, anthropologist Bernard Saladin d'Anglure first met Nappaaluk, and encouraged her to resume work on the novel and finish the final episodes. Saladin d'Anglure, a graduate student working under Claude Lévi-Strauss at the time, later made Sanaaq the focus of his PhD in ethnology; in addition to interviewing Nappaaluk about the work and recording her commentary about it, he worked with the author to transliterate and translate the novel.

== Publication ==
The first edition of Sanaaq was published as Sanaaq unikkausinnguaq in 1984 by the Association Inuksiutiit. The work was published in standard syllabics and included illustrations.

In 2002, a French edition of Sanaaq was published by Quebec publishing house, Les Éditions Stanké, with Saladin d'Anglure serving as the translator.

== Plot summary ==
Sanaaq opens on an episode about the title character, a young widow named Sanaaq, who is preparing to set out with her dogs to find and gather branches for weaving into a mat. The episode ends with Sanaaq returning home with her heavy load and offering berries to her daughter, Qumaq.

Through 48 short but sequential episodes, Sanaaq tells the story of an extended Inuit family and the various activities—such as making and repairing clothing, building seasonal ice shelters, gathering bird eggs, and hunting seals—that make up their day-to-day, semi-nomadic existence living almost entirely off the land apart. The novel is loosely set around the time of the early 1950s, when the Inuit of Kangirsujuaq had regular but limited contact with Qallunaat, or Euro-Canadians.

== Style ==
The style of the novel is influenced by the author's primary aim of providing an educational language resource. The novel's episodes often introduce new vocabulary terms to the reader, first in Inuktitut, and then again repeated with more context or with synonyms that serve to further explain the meaning of the word.

Saldin d'Anglure describes Nappaaluk's style as "brisk, fluid, and lively", and attributes this to both the novel being written in syllabics and the Inuit oral tradition which may have introduced a greater element of lyricism to the writing.

== Significance ==
Sanaaq has been called the first Canadian Inuit novel, although it was not the first to be published; Markoosie Patsauq's Harpoon of the Hunter was first published in 1970, although Sanaaq was written earlier. It is also regarded as the first Inuktitut-language novel.

According to the foreword in the 2014 English edition of Sanaaq, the original edition of the novel, published in syllabics, "may be found in all Inuit schools across northern Canada."

The name of the Centre Sanaaq in Montreal is derived from the novel.
