= Bernard Saladin d'Anglure =

Canadian anthropologist and ethnographer (1936–2025)

- Born: May 1936; France
- Died: 13 February 2025 (aged 88)
- Occupations: Anthropologist, ethnographer

Bernard Saladin d'Anglure (May 1936 – 13 February 2025) was a Canadian anthropologist and ethnographer. His work primarily concerned itself with the Inuit of Northern Canada, especially practices of shamanism and conceptions of gender. As an anthropological theorist, he studied under the structuralist Claude Lévi-Strauss, but became most recognized for his innovative methodology and elaboration of the concept of the "third sex". He spoke French, English and Inuktitut fluently. He was a professor at the Université Laval.

== Biographical information ==
Saladin d'Anglure was born in France in May 1936. At the age of 19, he came to Canada through a bursary from the Fondation Nationale des Bourses Zellidja, and travelled throughout Northern Quebec, spending several weeks in the settlement of Quaaqtaq, Nunavik.

Upon his return, he began a master's degree in anthropology at the Université de Montréal, receiving the degree in 1964. Saladin d'Anglure completed a Ph.D. in ethnology from the École pratique des hautes études de Paris in 1971. During his graduate work, he travelled to Canada to act as an assistant to noted French anthropologist Claude Lévi-Strauss in Nunavik, Quebec.

Returning to Canada in 1971, he gained a permanent position as professor of Anthropology at the Université Laval as well as the directorship of the Department, which he held until 1974. His work at the Université has remained centred on Nunavik and Baffin Island—particularly the community of Igloolik, Nunavut—and Inuit shamanism.

In 1977, he founded Études Inuit Studies, a bilingual international journal concerning the ethnography, political structures and hard scientific study of the peoples of the Arctic. He was the founder of the biennial Inuit Studies Conference as well as the Inuit and Circumpolar Studies Group, which has contributed significantly to Arctic social sciences in Canada. Saladin d'Anglure received the Government of Canada's Northern Science Award in 2001.

He held the office of Professor Emeritus (Retired) at the Université Laval.

Saladin d'Anglure died on 13 February 2025, at the age of 88.

== Anthropological work ==
=== Methodological contributions ===
Saladin d'Anglure was a pioneer in the use of visual techniques to collect ethnographic data. Along with Asen Balikci, he was one of the first very first users of audio-video techniques to record ethnographic data among the Inuit, and produced and consulted for over twenty films, both academic and otherwise. A notable example of the latter is Atanarjuat: The Fast Runner (Kunuk, 2001).

He produced long-length ethnographic material, notably Igloolik Nunavut/Igloolik notre terre, in partnership with Michel Treguer. The film explores traditional Inuit ways of life as they are affected by such changes as prefabricated housing, and the beginnings of the process started by Inuit to create Nunavut.

He also expanded on some of the work for which he acted as a consultant, publishing Au Pays des Inuit: Un Film, un Peuple, une Légende (2002) as an ethnographic and historical companion to Kunuk's Atanarjuat.

He collaborated closely with Igloolik Isuma Productions in production, editing, and counselling roles, and maintained a close relationship with the community of Igloolik, Nunavut: his son, Guillaume Saladin, is one of the founding members of the Inuit circus troupe Artcirq.

Throughout his work as an anthropologist, Saladin d'Anglure was a defender of autonomy and expression among the Inuit, as well as reappropriation of culture and anthropological data. In 1974, he founded the Association Inuksiutiit Katimajiit Inc., a Canadian non-profit society whose primary purpose was to return to the Inuit the research data, such as land use maps and family trees, that he had collected. He helped to translate the first Inuktitut-language novel, Sanaaq, written by Mitiarjuk Nappaaluk and edited in 1983, into French.

=== Theoretical contributions ===
Saladin d'Anglure contributed a significant volume of literature on the subject of Inuit culture, particularly regarding gender constructions and cosmogony: he authored one hundred and sixteen articles, seventeen books, and various other publications on the subject.

Saladin d'Anglure's research on shamanism and gender brought to light a conception of Inuit shamans which was strongly dissociated with the traditionally accepted images of violence. In Être et renaître Inuit: homme, femme ou chamane (2006), he explores the conception of Inuit shaman as "boundary-crossers", who can navigate between the spiritual and material worlds as well as fall under a third conception of gender— separate from either male or female. This idea of shamanism as transcending the duality of gender contends with examinations of Inuit social life in winter conducted by Mauss. While Inuit spousal exchanges which had been declared "sexual communism" by Mauss, Saladin d'Anglure's analysis of shamanic practice argues the creation of a "third sex" as a balancing factor.

Saladin d'Anglure also wrote on Inuit intrauterine narratives, which describe individual Inuit's experiences before birth—experiences that are remembered even into past lives and, as such, indicate some relationship with the concept of reincarnation.

Though his analysis was strongly influenced by the Structuralist school, Saladin d'Anglure often deviated from the theories of Lévi-Strauss. According to Lévi-Strauss' structuralism, Inuit should have more complex technology than Southern populations while maintaining a simpler kinship system; Saladin d'Anglure's data, however, indicated an extremely complex kinship system based on shamanism and reincarnation.

Though he never declared himself a theorist of the Structuralist school, they maintained a close professional relationship, with Lévi-Strauss writing the preface to Être et renaître Inuit and going so far as to declare it a future classic.

== Selected publications ==
- Être et renaître Inuit. Homme, femme, ou chamane (2006)
- Au Pays des Inuit: Un Film, un Peuple, une Légende (2002)
- Igloolik Nunavut: Igloolik notre terre, with Michel Truguer (1976)
