= CCGS Hudson =

Canadian Coast Guard research vessel

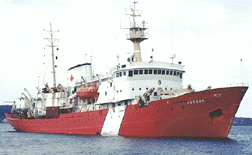
- CCGS Hudson

History

Canada
- Name: Hudson
- Namesake: Henry Hudson, explorer
- Operator: Canadian Oceanographic Service; Canadian Coast Guard
- Port of registry: Ottawa
- Builder: Saint John Shipbuilding, Saint John
- Yard number: 1046
- Launched: 28 March 1963
- Completed: December 1963
- Commissioned: February 1964
- Decommissioned: 19 January 2022
- Refit: 2017
- Home port: CCG Base Dartmouth, Nova Scotia (Maritime Region)
- Identification: CGDG; IMO number: 540279
- Fate: Sold for scrap

General characteristics
- Type: Oceanographic and hydrographic survey vessel
- Tonnage: 3,444 GT; 1,150 DWT; 1,033 NT
- Length: 90.4 m (296 ft 7 in) oa.; 80.8 m (265 ft 1 in) pp.
- Beam: 15.4 m (50 ft 6 in)
- Draught: 6.8 m (22 ft 4 in)
- Ice class: CASPPR Arctic Class 2
- Propulsion: Diesel electric DC/DC – 4 × Alco V16-251B diesel engine; 2 × fixed pitch propellers, 6,469 kW (8,675 hp); 2 × Caterpillar 398 generators (AC Electrical Distribution)
- Speed: 17 knots (31 km/h; 20 mph)
- Range: 23,100 nmi (42,800 km; 26,600 mi) at 10.5 kn (19.4 km/h; 12.1 mph)
- Endurance: 105 days
- Boats & landing craft carried: 1 × RHIB
- Complement: 31
- Aircraft carried: 1 × MBB Bo 105 helicopter
- Aviation facilities: 28 m^{2} (300 sq ft) hangar; 138 m^{2} (1,490 sq ft) flight deck

CCGS Hudson (Note: CCGS stands for Canadian Coast Guard Ship) was an offshore oceanographic and hydrographic survey vessel operated by the Canadian Coast Guard. The ship entered service in 1963 with the Canadian Oceanographic Service, stationed at the Bedford Institute of Oceanography, called CSS Hudson. The ship made several significant scientific voyages, among them the first circumnavigation of the Americas in 1970. The ship was transferred to the Canadian Coast Guard in 1996 and decommissioned in 2022, and was later replaced by CCGS Naalak Nappaaluk.

== Description ==
The first Canadian ship built specifically for hydrographic and oceanographic survey work, Hudson was designed by the Montreal firm of Gilmore, German and Milne. Hudson is 90.4 metres (296 ft 7 in) long overall and 80.8 m (265 ft 1 in) between perpendiculars with a beam of 15.4 metres (50 ft 6 in) and a draught of 6.8 metres (22 ft 4 in) The ship has a tonnage of 3,444 gross tonnage (GT), 1,150 tons deadweight (DWT) and a 1,033 net tonnage (NT). (Note: The Miramar Ship Index and the Canadian Coast Guard have the same tonnage numbers, though the Miramar Ship Index uses as built numbers, giving it as 3,444 gross register tons (GRT).) Hudson is certified as Arctic class 2. The ship is powered by a diesel electric DC/DC system composed of four Alco 251B diesel engines for propulsion and two Caterpillar 398 generators for AC electrical distribution. The propulsion system, rated at 6,469 kilowatts (8,675 hp), drives two fixed pitch propellers and bow thrusters, giving the ship a maximum speed of 17 knots (31 km/h; 20 mph). The ship is also equipped with one Caterpillar 398 emergency generator. The ship has a fuel capacity of 1,268.00 m^{3} (278,920 imp gal) of diesel fuel, giving the ship a range of 23,100 nautical miles (42,800 km; 26,600 mi) at 10.5 knots (19.4 km/h; 12.1 mph) and an endurance of 105 days.

The ship is outfitted with a 138 m^{2} (1,490 sq ft) flight deck and a 28 m^{2} (300 sq ft) hangar and is capable of operating one light helicopter of either the MBB Bo 105 or Bell 206L types. Hudson is equipped with one RHIB and has four laboratories. There is one 40 m^{2} (430 sq ft) geo-chem lab, two 20 m^{2} (220 sq ft) labs, one hydrographic and one oceanographic and one 18 m^{2} (190 sq ft) general purpose lab. The ship has a complement of 31, comprising 11 officers and 20 crew, with 23 additional berths available.

== Service history ==
Hudson was constructed and funded by the Canadian Department of Energy, Mines and Resources on behalf of the Canadian Oceanographic Service. The ship was built by Saint John Shipbuilding at their shipyard in Saint John, New Brunswick with the yard number 1046. The vessel was launched on 28 March 1963 and completed in December later that year. Named for the explorer Henry Hudson the ship entered service as CSS Hudson, (Note: CSS stands for Canadian Survey Ship) in February 1964. The ship is based at Dartmouth, Nova Scotia at the Bedford Institute of Oceanography.

During the 1960s, Hudson performed five surveys of the Mid-Atlantic Ridge as part of the world-wide study of continental drift. The ship took part in Expo '67 and had satellite navigation installed, becoming the first ship outside the United States Navy to have the technology. In 1969, Hudson circumnavigated North America. From November 1969 to October 1970, the vessel circumnavigated North and South America, starting in Nova Scotia, travelling south to Antarctic waters, around the southern tip of South America, north through the mid-Pacific and back to Nova Scotia through the Northwest Passage. Hudson was the first vessel to circumnavigate both continents. While transiting, the ship carried out several experiments, among them studies of marine life along the east coast of the Americas, tidal current surveys of Chilean fjords and geographic discoveries in the Pacific Ocean. This voyage, in which over 100 scientists participated during various stages, was documented in the 1973 book "Voyage to the Edge of the World" by Alan Edmonds ISBN 0771030673.

During surveys of Canada's Arctic, Hudson employed a helicopter for the first time. During the early 1970s, Hudson performed surveys of the Bay of Fundy and Gulf of Maine. In March 1976, Hudson rescued the entire crew of the fishery patrol vessel Cape Freels, which had been abandoned on the Grand Banks of Newfoundland after catching fire. In the late 1970s, Hudson carried out the first survey of Baffin Bay.

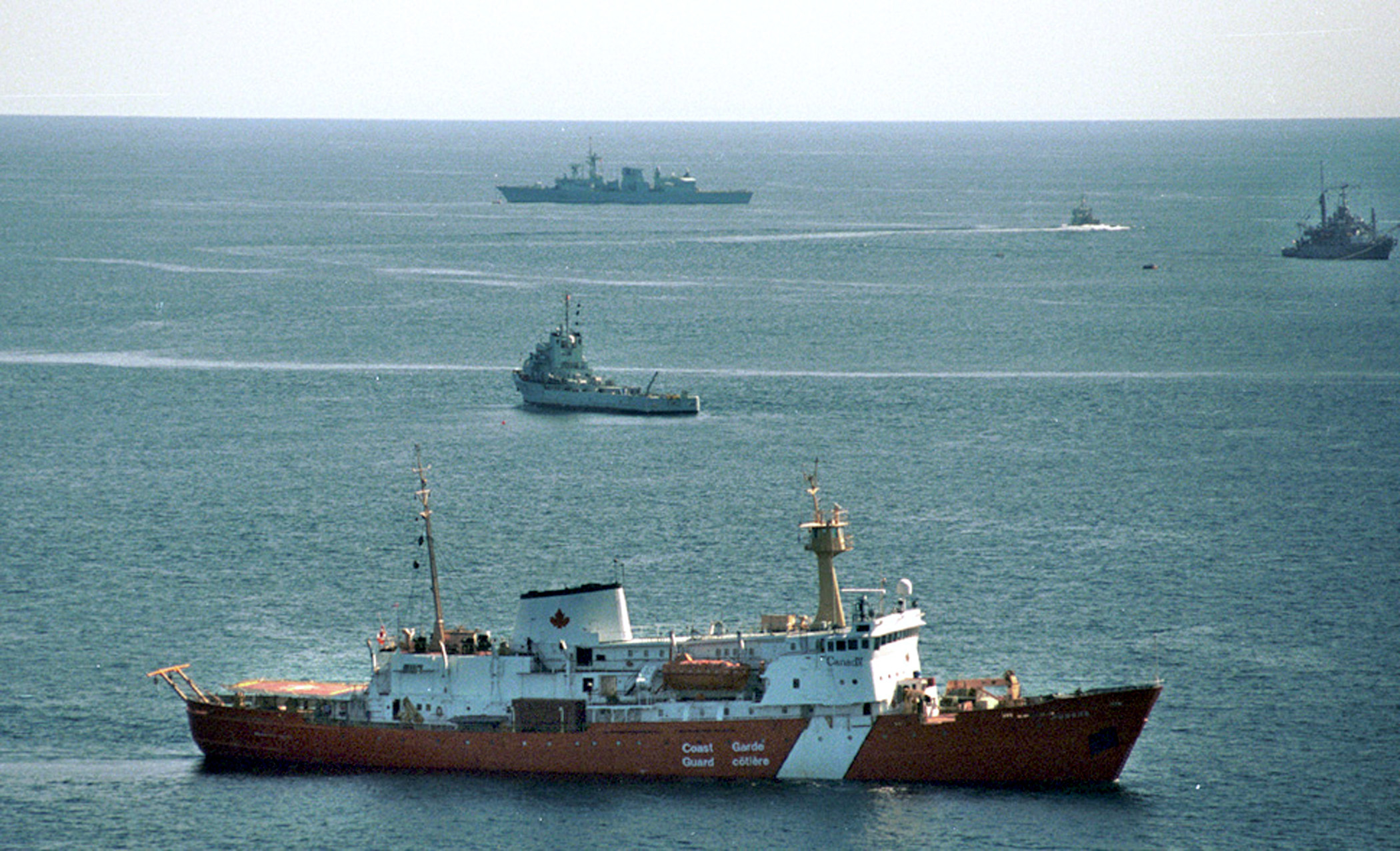
Hudson searching for debris from Swissair Flight 111 in foreground

In the 1980s and 1990s, Hudson took part in large surveys that were part of international programs such as the Joint Global Ocean Fluxes Study and World Ocean Circulation Experiment. In 1980, Hudson circumnavigated North America. Hudson contributed significantly during recovery operations during the aftermath of the semi-submersible mobile offshore drilling unit Ocean Ranger that sank in Eastern Canadian waters on 15 February 1982. Hudson saved all 24 crew members of MV Skipper 1 in the North Atlantic on 29 April 1987. On 28 April 1988, an explosion was spotted by the crew over the horizon. When Hudson arrived on scene, they found the tanker Athenian Venture on fire and in two pieces. Hudson recovered only one body from among the wreckage.

In the 1990s, Hudson performed surveys in Greenland waters, Rankin Inlet and Chesterfield Inlet. During operations in Greenland waters, ice tore a 15-foot (4.6 m) gash in the hull of the ship. Hudson was forced to return to Canada for repairs. In 1996, Hudson joined the fleet of the Canadian Coast Guard. Hudson contributed to the recovery operations during the recovery operations of Swissair Flight 111 in the waters off of Peggy's Cove, Nova Scotia, Canada during the autumn months of 1998. From 1999 to 2001, Hudson performed surveys in the Sable Island region.

=== Replacement and retirement ===
In 2007 the Government of Canada announced several new shipbuilding projects for the Canadian Coast Guard, including a replacement for Hudson, expected to be in service by 2012. The ship rescued the seven-man crew of the fishing vessel Ocean Commander which burned and sank on 6 July 2009. The construction of the replacement for Hudson was delayed, forcing the Canadian Coast Guard to replace rusting plates aboard Hudson in 2012. The repairs were completed in September 2015. Hudson underwent a $4 million CAD refit beginning on 19 December 2016. The refit was performed by Heddle Marine at their shipyard in Hamilton, Ontario. Hudson was towed out of Heddle Marine's shipyard to the Canada Centre for Inland Waters in Burlington, Ontario, a Government of Canada facility. The vessel's refit, scheduled to be finished in May 2017 was unfinished at the time of the ship's removal. Hudson returned to the East Coast on 14 November 2017 to ensure that the ship was out of the Saint Lawrence Seaway before it closed. The ship underwent further refit at Halifax, which included modification to the cabins and laboratories. The ship is scheduled to return to service in April 2018. On 12 February 2019, St. John's Dockyard Ltd. of St. John's, Newfoundland and Labrador was awarded the contract to extend Hudson's service life by another five to ten years. Hudson began the six-month refit on 25 February. On completion of her refit in mid-2020, the ship's retirement date was estimated as 2024. In 2021, further mechanical problems forced the curtailment of one mission and the cancellation of another. After suffering a starboard engine failure Hudson was decommissioned in January 2022. The replacement, CCGS Naalak Nappaaluk, is not scheduled for delivery until 2024–2025.

== See also ==
- CFAV Quest - Survey vessel in the Royal Canadian Navy

== Sources ==
- "CCG Fleet: Vessel Details – CCGS Hudson". Canadian Coast Guard. 24 March 2017.
- "Hudson (5405279)". Miramar Ship Index.
- Maginley, Charles D. & Collin, Bernard (2001). The Ships of Canada's Marine Services. St. Catharines, Ontario: Vanwell Publishing Limited. ISBN 1-55125-070-5.
- Maginley, Charles D. (2003). The Canadian Coast Guard 1962–2002. St. Catharines, Ontario: Vanwell Publishing Limited. ISBN 1-55125-075-6.
