= Inuit Studies Conference =

Biannual academic conference

The Inuit Studies Conference (ISC, alternatively called the Congrès d'Études Inuit, CEI) is a biannual international and multidisciplinary conference, usually held in the fall, at institutions in North America and Europe. Presenters include Elders, university researchers, professionals, artists, and representatives from Inuit communities, governments, and organizations. Presentations focus on all aspects of Inuit society, history, language, and culture, as well as the Inuit homeland, its environment, geography, and ecology.

The Inuit Studies Conference was first held in 1978 and was founded by Bernard Saladin d'Anglure. Conference hosts are chosen by the Inuksiutiit Katimajiit Association. Past editions of the Inuit Studies Conference have been held at the following institutions.

ISC #	Year	Location
1	1978	Université Laval, Québec, Canada
2	1980	Université Laval, Québec, Canada
3	1982	University of Western Ontario, London, ON, Canada
4	1984	Concordia University, Montréal, Canada
5	1986	McGill University, Montréal, Québec, Canada
6	1988	University of Copenhagen, Copenhagen, Denmark
7	1990	University of Alaska Fairbanks, Fairbanks, USA
8	1992	Université Laval, Québec, Canada
9	1994	Arctic College, Nunatta Campus, Iqaluit, Northwest Territories, Canada
10	1996	Memorial University of Newfoundland, St. John's, Newfoundland, Canada
11	1998	Ilisimatusarfik, University of Greenland, Greenland
12	2000	University of Aberdeen, Scotland
13	2002	Department of Alaska Native and Rural Development, Anchorage, Alaska, USA
14	2004	The Arctic Institute of North America, University of Calgary, Calgary, Canada
15	2006	National Institute of Oriental Languages and Civilization, Paris, France
16	2008	St. John's College, University of Manitoba, Winnipeg, Canada
17	2010	Université du Québec en Abitibi-Témiscamingue, Val d’Or, Québec, Canada
18	2012	Smithsonian Institution, Washington, DC, USA
19	2014	Université Laval, Québec, Canada
20	2016	Memorial University of Newfoundland, St. John's, Newfoundland, Canada
21	2019	Université du Québec à Montréal, Montreal, Québec, Canada
22	2022	Qaumajuq, Winnipeg Art Gallery, Winnipeg, Manitoba, Canada
