= Inuktitut Braille =

Proposed braille alphabet of the Inuktitut language

- Script type: alphabet
- Print basis: Inuktitut syllabics
- Languages: Inuktitut

Related scripts
- Parent systems: Braille: Inuktitut Braille

Inuktitut Braille is a proposed braille alphabet of the Inuktitut language based on Inuktitut syllabics. Unlike syllabics, it is a true alphabet, with separate letters for consonants and vowels, though vowels are written before the consonants they follow in speech. It was published in 2012 by Tamara Kearney, Manager of Braille Research and Development at the Commonwealth Braille and Talking Book Cooperative. The book The Orphan and the Polar Bear (ᐃᓕᐊᕐᔪᒃ ᓇᓄᕐᓗ) was the first (and perhaps only) work transliterated into Inuktitut Braille.

== Chart ==
Each letter of Inuktitut syllabics is transliterated with two braille cells. The first cell indicated the orientation of the syllabic letter, and the second its shape. Since the orientation of a letter indicates the vowel of a syllable, and shape indicates the consonant, this means that the syllable ki, for example, is written ik. Vowel length, indicated with a diacritic dot in syllabics, is written by adding an extra dot to the consonant letter in braille, so that the syllable kī is effectively written iķ in braille.

=== Vowels ===
The four vowel letters are as follows:

ai	i	u	a

The vowels u and a mimic the orientations of some consonants carrying these vowels, being practically identical to the null-consonant syllables ᐅ u and ᐊ a as well as to ᐳ pu and ᐸ pa.

Vowel letters do not occur alone, but are carried by a null consonant ⠁ to write a vowel-initial syllable. For a long vowel, a dot is added to the null consonant letter, ⠡. Thus the syllables consisting of a vowel only are written:

⠰⠁ ᐁ ai
⠘⠁ ᐃ i
⠘⠡ ᐄ ī
⠕⠁ ᐅ u
⠕⠡ ᐆ ū
⠪⠁ ᐊ a
⠪⠡ ᐋ ā

Consonants follow English Braille as closely as possible. For example, the Latin consonant letter k is ⠅ in braille, and this ⠅ is used for the consonant sound /k/ in Inuktitut Braille as well. ⠅ is used alone for /k/ at the end of a syllable (in syllabics, ᒃ). Syllables beginning with /k/ combine ⠅ with a vowel cell, as follows:

⠰⠅ ᑫ kai
⠘⠅ ᑭ ki
⠕⠅ ᑯ ku
⠪⠅ ᑲ ka

And with long vowels:

⠘⠥ ᑮ kī
⠕⠥ ᑰ kū
⠪⠥ ᑳ kā

These vowel letters are used consistently, according to the spoken phonemic vowel, regardless of whether the orientation of symmetry of the syllabic letter is orthogonal in print, as in the null consonant above, or diagonal, as in k.

=== Consonants ===
Inuktitut braille consonants were chosen according to romanized Inuktitut rather than syllabics. For example, ᖅ q is written with the single letter ⠟, braille q, rather than as ᕐ r plus ᒃ k as it is in syllabics.

Consonant assignments differ somewhat from English and international conventions. Since v in English Braille, ⠧, has a dot at position 6, which is used for long vowels in Inuktitut Braille, the letter for the similar sound f, ⠋, was substituted for ᕝ v. The Inuktitut letters for ng, nng, and ł have no simple equivalent in English Braille, so the braille letters for English e, d, and c are used. The consonants are therefore as follows:

Final consonant or consonant with a short vowel	ᑉ p	ᑦ t	ᒃ k	ᒡ g	ᒻ m	ᓐ n	ᔅ s	ᓪ l
Consonant with a long vowel	p_:	t_:	k_:	g_:	m_:	n_:	s_:	l_:
(short vowel or final)	ᔾ j	ᕝ v	ᕐ r	ᖅ q	ᖕ ng	ᖖ nng	ᖦ ł	' h
(long vowel)	j_:	v_:	r_:	q_:	ng_:	nng_:	ł_:	h_:

For example, ᓄᓇᕗᑦ Nunavut is ⠕⠝⠪⠝⠕⠋⠞ in braille (literally "unanuvt"), and ᓄᓇᕕᒃ Nunavik is ⠕⠝⠪⠝⠘⠋⠅.

Inuktitut syllabics are irregular for the last few letters: ng and nng are only diacritics, and require a carrying letter g to support a vowel; ł has irregular rotation, and h is a diacritic requiring the null consonant to support a vowel. In Inuktitut Braille, however, they behave as any other consonant, so that all CV syllables are written with two braille cells regardless of how the consonant is written in syllabics. For example, ᙱ nngi is just ⠘⠙, and ᕼᐃ hi is just ⠘⠓.

=== Digits and punctuation ===
Digits and punctuation are identical to those of Unified English Braille with two exceptions: ⠠ is used for the Grade 1 indicator which would only be employed when indicating a grade 1 passage in English or other contracted languages since Inuktitut Braille does not have grades, and ⠸ is used for the "single" indicator the purpose of which is to indicate the use of a single glyph used outside any other context or glyphs from other writing systems.

== Examples ==
The following is a sample text, first in braille, then in syllabics and romanization.

⠕⠁⠪⠟⠘⠇⠪⠭⠘⠗⠞⠀⠕⠁⠪⠟⠕⠁⠘⠎⠪⠟⠟⠕⠞⠘⠝⠅
ᐅᖃᓕᒫᕆᑦ ᐅᖃᐅᓯᖃᖅᑐᓂᒃ
uqalimārit uqausiqaqtunit

⠘⠁⠕⠝⠕⠟⠘⠞⠞⠪⠞⠂⠀⠘⠁⠘⠇⠟⠕⠅⠘⠎⠕⠟⠘⠞⠞⠪⠞⠂
ᐃᓄᖁᑎᑦᑕ, ᐃᓕᖅᑯᓯᖁᑎᑦᑕ,
inuqutitta, iliqkusiqutitta,

⠕⠡⠪⠍⠕⠚⠞⠂⠀⠘⠁⠘⠇⠪⠞⠘⠗⠪⠚⠕⠁⠚⠕⠚⠘⠞⠞⠪⠞⠂
ᐆᒪᔪᑦ, ᐃᓕᑕᕆᔭᐅᔾᔪᑎᑦᑕ,
ūmajut, ilitarijaujjutitta,

⠘⠏⠘⠛⠪⠁⠗⠘⠝⠘⠗⠪⠇⠕⠁⠟⠪⠞⠞⠪⠞⠂
ᐱᒋᐊᕐᓂᕆᓚᐅᖅᑕᑦᑕ,
pigiarnirilauqtatta,

⠕⠝⠪⠝⠕⠋⠪⠾⠟⠘⠎⠪⠍⠘⠝⠞⠪⠞⠕⠇
ᓄᓇᕗᑖᖅᓯᒪᓂᑦᑕᓗ
nunavutāqsimanittalu

⠘⠍⠅⠪⠮⠕⠽⠪⠑⠕⠚⠘⠝⠅⠂⠀⠪⠁⠍⠪⠍⠕⠇
ᒥᒃᓵᓅᖓᔪᓂᒃ, ᐊᒻᒪᓗ
miksānūngajunik, ammalu

⠪⠁⠘⠍⠕⠎⠅⠪⠅⠝⠘⠝⠗⠘⠝⠅⠲
ᐊᒥᓱᒃᑲᓐᓂᕐᓂᒃ.
amisukkannirnik.

== See also ==
- Iñupiaq Braille
