= Mauss =

Mauss is a German surname. Notable people with the surname include:

- François Mauss, the founder and president of the Grand Jury Européen
- Karl Mauss (1898–1959), German military commander
- Marcel Mauss (1872–1950), French sociologist and ethnologist
- Werner Mauss (born 1940), German private investigator

== See also ==
- M.A.U.S.S., acronym for the Mouvement Anti-Utilitariste dans les Sciences Sociales (Anti-utilitarian Movement in the Social Sciences) a French intellectual movement started in 1981
