= Ł̣ =

Letter of the Latin alphabet

Ł̣ (minuscule: ł̣) is a letter of the Latin alphabet, derived from Ł with a diacritical dot below.

In some dialects of the Iñupiaq language, a Eskaleut language, it is used to represent the voiceless palatal lateral fricative. It is attested in the Siḷaliñiġmiutun (North Slope) and Malimiutun (Northwest Arctic) dialects. In these Iñupiaq alphabets, the slash in the ł̣ character indicates voicelessness and the diacritical dot indicates palatalization; a plain l character is the voiced alveolar lateral fricative.
