= Kangiqsujuaq =

Kangiqsujuaq ᑲᖏᕐᓱᔪᐊᖅ
- Northern village municipality
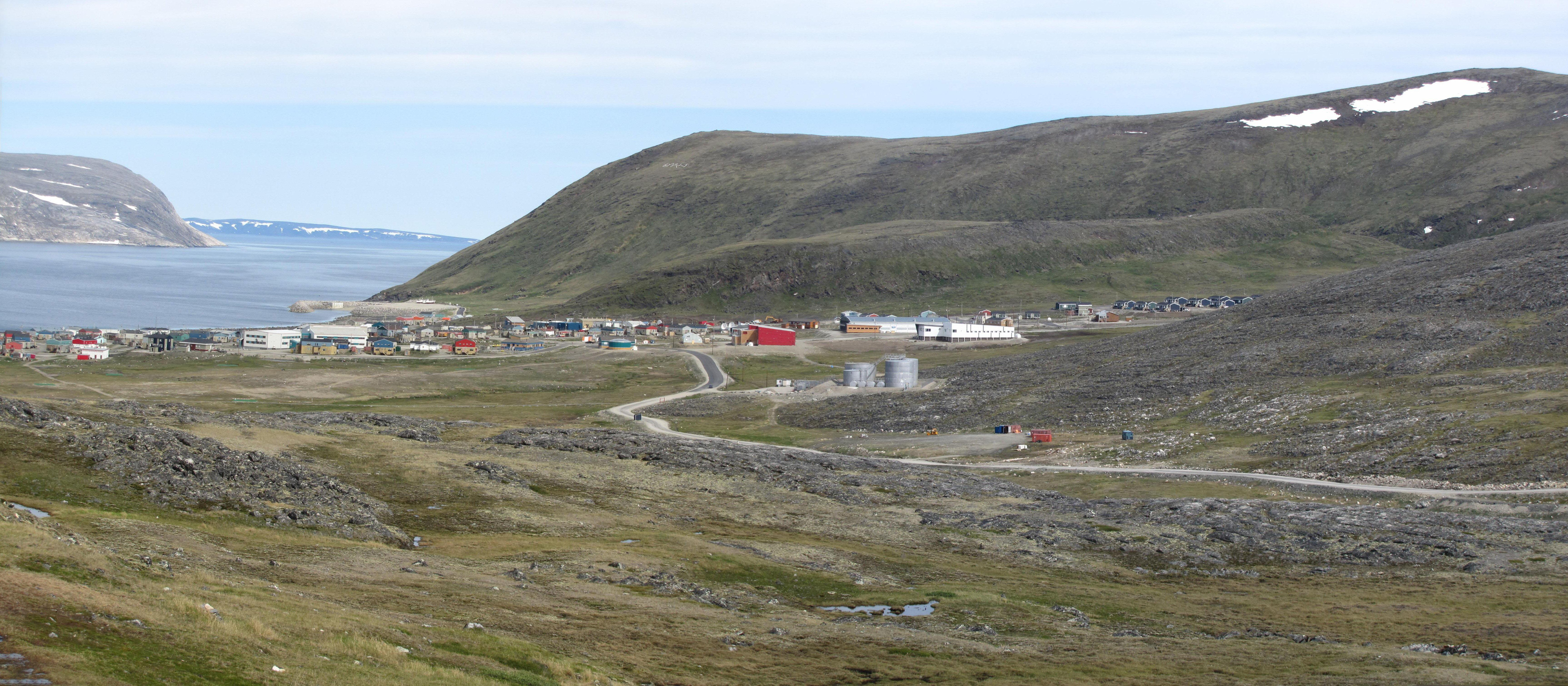

- Location within Quebec
- Coordinates (901, chemin Sinaitia): 61°36′N 71°58′W
- Country: Canada
- Province: Quebec
- Region: Nord-du-Québec
- TE: Kativik
- Constituted: September 20, 1980

Government
  - Mayor: Charlie Arngak
  - Federal riding: Abitibi—Baie-James—Nunavik—Eeyou
  - Prov. riding: Ungava

Area
  - Total: 12.60 km^{2} (4.86 sq mi)
  - Land: 12.31 km^{2} (4.75 sq mi)

Population (2021)
  - Total: 837
  - Density: 67.5/km^{2} (175/sq mi)
  - Pop 2006-2011: ▲11.6%
  - Dwellings: 321
- Time zone: UTC−5 (EST)
  - Summer (DST): UTC−4 (EDT)
- Postal code(s): J0M 1K0
- Area code: 819
- Highways: No major highways
- Website: www.nvkangiqsujuaq.ca

Kangiqsujuaq (Inuktitut: ᑲᖏᕐᓱᔪᐊᖅ) is a northern village (Inuit community) in Nunavik, Nord-du-Québec, Quebec, Canada. It had a population of 837 in the Canada 2021 Census. The community has also been known as Wakeham Bay. The name "Kangiqsujuaq" means "the large bay" in Inuktitut.

It is located on the Ungava Peninsula, on the Cap du Prince-de-Galles on the Hudson Strait. It is served by the small Kangiqsujuaq Airport.

During winter, when the tides are extremely low, local Inuit sometimes climb beneath the shifting sea ice to gather blue mussels. They break holes in the ice and then can walk for a short time on the exposed sea bed and collect this food. This risky way of gathering the mussels goes back for generations.

As the other villages of the Kativik region, the Kativik Regional Police Force provides police services in Kangiqsujuaq.

Kangiqsujuaq is the closest community to the Qajartalik archaeological site, a site featuring petroglyphs created by the Dorset culture. In 2017, it was announced that the Qajartalik would be added to Canada's tentative list for nomination to the UNESCO World Heritage Site list.

== History ==
The first semi-permanent post in the area by Europeans was in 1910, when the French company Révillon Frères established a post at Kangiqsujuaq. Due to the success of the mission, the Hudson Bay Company replicated it 4 years later in 1914.

The area, rich in, copper and nickel started to be mined in the 1950s.

The very first church in the area was established in 1963 and it was an Anglican church.

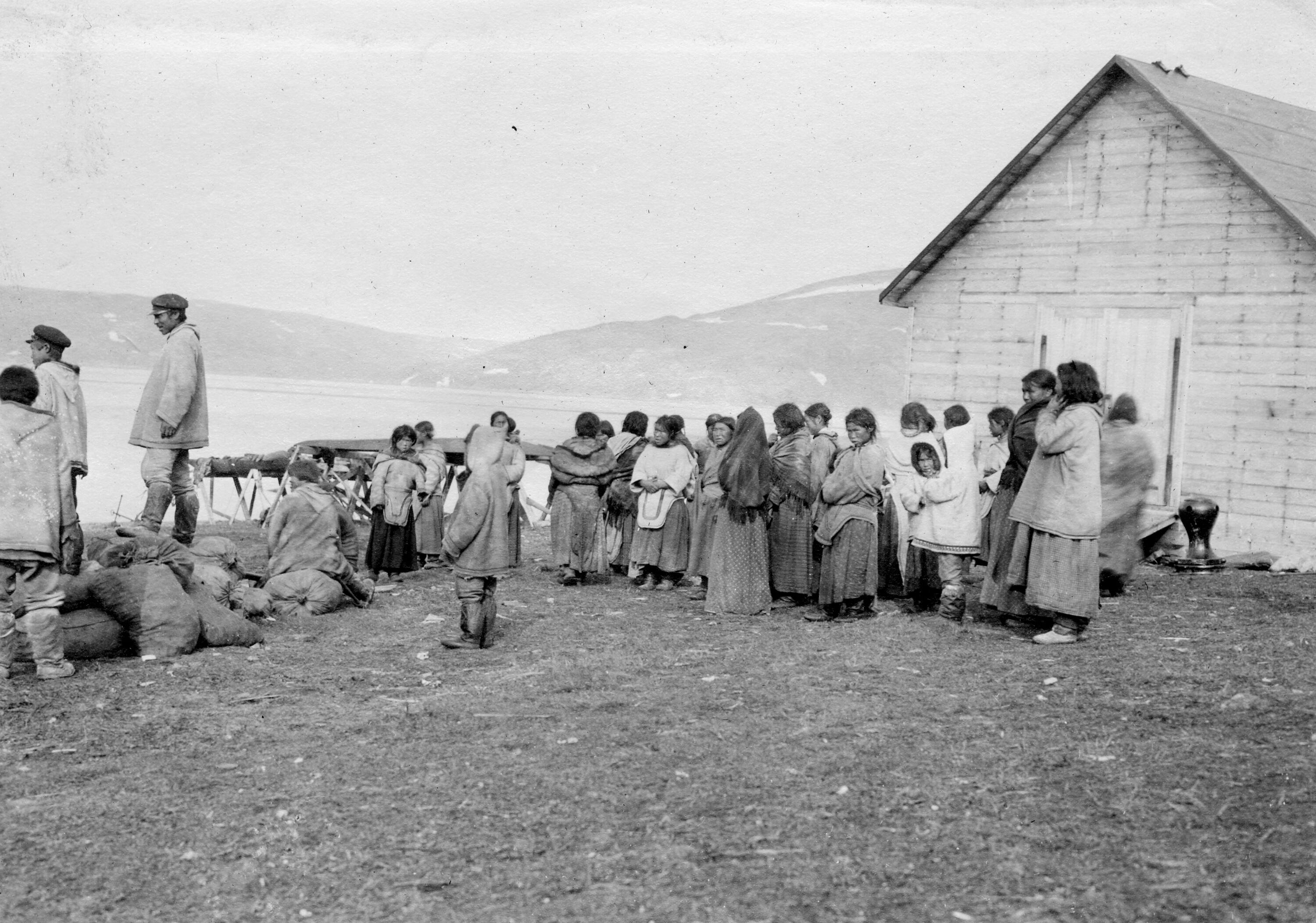
Revillon Frères post servants at Kangiqsujuaq in 1909.

== Demographics ==
In the 2021 Census of Population conducted by Statistics Canada, Kangiqsujuaq had a population of 837 living in 297 of its 321 total private dwellings, a change of 11.6% from its 2016 population of 750. With a land area of 12.41 km^{2} (4.79 sq mi), it had a population density of 67.4/km^{2} (174.7/sq mi) in 2021.

== Education ==
The Kativik School Board operates the Arsaniq School.

== In the media ==
- KANGIQSUJUAQ (1961 et 1966) - A 41 minutes film, directed by Bernard Saladin d'Anglure about the village in the 1960s.
