= Louise Fish =

Louise Fish (born 1955) is a Canadian university administrator and former military officer.

Born in Toronto, Fish attended McMaster University and joined the Canadian military in 1974. Fish was "the first woman to serve as a naval officer at sea [and] the first woman to qualify and serve as a ship's diving officer" in the Royal Canadian Navy. After retiring from the navy she became first female president of the Ontario Association of College and University Security Administrators. As of 2018 she is the Director of Risk Management at Trent University. In 2010 she received the Governor General's Award in Commemoration of the Persons Case.
