= Asen Balikci =

Canadian anthropologist (1929–2019)

Asen Balikci (1929-2019) was an anthropologist and filmmaker.

He was born Asen Nikolov in Istanbul, Turkey, in 1929, to a Bulgarian mother and a Slavic Macedonian father. He grew up in Istanbul, Sofia, and a village in Bulgaria, speaking Bulgarian, Greek, and French. After World War II, while living in Turkey, the family changed its surname to Balikci (Turkish: balıkçı, "fisher, fishseller") to avoid problems associated with non-Turkish, non-Muslim surnames.

Balikci eventually moved to Canada, where he did manual labor and began an independent ethnographic study of Slavic workers. In 1954, he began work at the National Museum of Canada (now the Canadian Museum of History). After a colleague died during fieldwork in 1955, Balikci took over the colleague's research among the Inuit.

Balikci later studied anthropology at Columbia University, where he worked with Margaret Mead. He completed three years of fieldwork in Inuit communities. In 1963, he joined the University of Montreal, where he remained until retiring in 1993.

After retiring, he moved to Bulgaria and trained members of minority communities in ethnographic filmmaking. He died on January 2, 2019.

Balikci was a pioneer of visual anthropology. He helped establish film as an important tool in anthropological research and education.
