= CFAV Quest =

Canadian oceanographic research/acoustic vessel

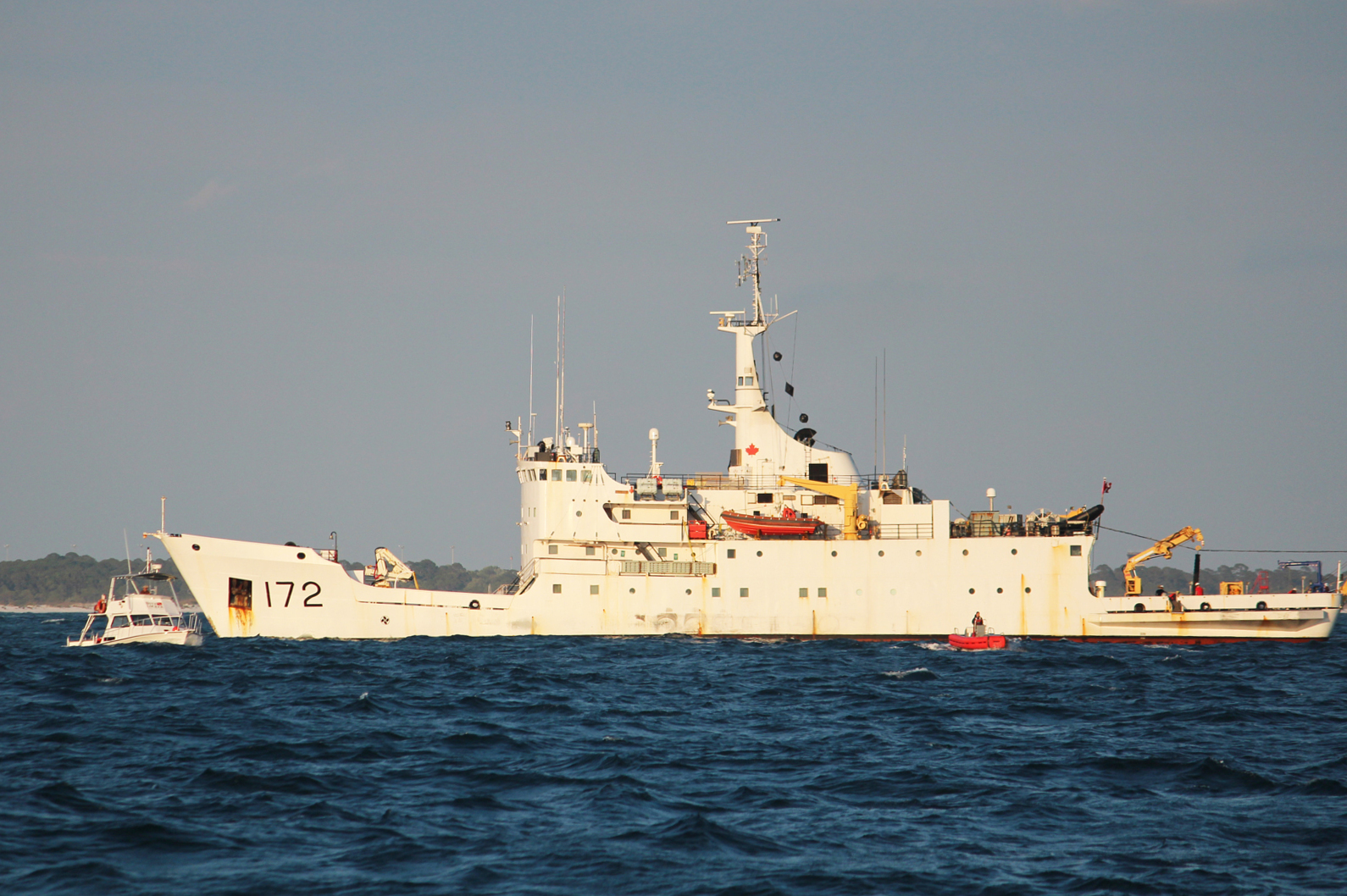
- CFAV Quest in 2013

Class overview
- Name: Quest class
- Builders: Burrard Dry Dock, North Vancouver
- Operators: Royal Canadian Navy
- Built: 1967–1969
- In commission: 1969–2016
- Completed: 1
- Scrapped: 1

History

Canada
- Name: Quest
- Builder: Burrard Shipbuilding & Drydock Ltd., Vancouver
- Laid down: 1967
- Launched: 9 July 1968
- Commissioned: 21 August 1969
- Decommissioned: 2016
- Home port: CFB Halifax
- Identification: IMO number: 6823117; Pennant number: AGOR 172
- Status: Awaiting disposal

General characteristics
- Type: Research vessel
- Displacement: 2,130 long tons (2,160 t)
- Length: 71.6 m (235 ft)
- Beam: 12.8 m (42 ft)
- Draught: 4.6 m (15 ft)
- Propulsion: Diesel electric, twin shaft, twin rudder; 2 × 10 cylinder Fairbanks-Morse 38D8 diesels driving 2 GE electric motors; 1 x gas turbine generator set, acoustically isolated for quiet operations at slow speeds or drifting
- Speed: 15 knots (28 km/h; 17 mph)
- Range: 10,000 nmi (19,000 km; 12,000 mi) at 12 kn (22 km/h; 14 mph)
- Endurance: 35 days
- Complement: 55
- Aviation facilities: Small helicopter deck – converted to rear crane platform

CFAV Quest was a specially quieted acoustic research vessel equipped for associated oceanographic and bathymetric/geologic data collection. The ship was operated by the Royal Canadian Navy and Defence Research and Development Canada and was the only ship with this capability in the fleet. Based out of Halifax, Nova Scotia, Quest's crew were civilian members of the Canadian Department of National Defence and the ship was classified as an auxiliary vessel (CFAV). In 2016 it was announced the ship was to be divested and ultimately decommissioned by the end of the year.

== Design ==
Quest was specifically designed as a quiet vessel for open ocean acoustics and related oceanographic and hydrographic research for the Royal Canadian Navy with extreme measures taken to isolate ship's machinery noise from the ocean. The ship was designed to operate in light ice conditions. The ship displaced 2,160 tonnes (2,130 long tons) and was 71.6 metres (234 ft 11 in) long overall with a beam of 12.8 m (42 ft 0 in) and a draught of 4.6 m (15 ft 1 in). The ship was fitted with a small helicopter platform capable of handling light helicopters but this was later removed and converted to a rear crane platform.

Quest was a diesel electric, twin shaft, twin rudder ship. The vessel was equipped with two 10-cylinder Fairbanks-Morse 38D8 diesel engines driving two GE electric motors. This gave the ship a speed of 15 knots (28 km/h; 17 mph). The vessel had an effective range of 10,000 nautical miles (19,000 km; 12,000 mi) at 12 knots (22 km/h; 14 mph) for 35 days.

Machinery was isolated with special measures to prevent noise from radiating to the sea. The twin diesel electric generator sets and other equipment were specially mounted and isolated with noise bulkheads for that purpose in normal propulsion. A gas turbine generator set in an acoustically isolated compartment was used for quiet operations at speeds below 7 knots (13 km/h; 8.1 mph) or drifting. Special quiet propellers designed by the National Research Council of Canada in 1964 were ten years later obsolete for quiet operation with new, quieter, ones being designed in cooperation with the Netherlands Ship Model Basin (NSMB).

A mid-life update was performed in 1997–1999. This included updated communications and navigational hardware along with improved noise insulation.

== Operational history ==
Construction of Quest began in 1967 by Burrard Shipbuilding & Drydock Ltd. at Vancouver, the ship was launched on 9 July 1968. After entering service on 21 August 1969 with the hull number AGOR 172, Quest was deployed on the East Coast. The vessel was used primarily for acoustic and associated ocean research in the north Atlantic Ocean and the Arctic Ocean. The ship was able to operate in the heavy ice of the Arctic Ocean when accompanied by an icebreaker.

Quest took part in international projects, some with extensive coverage and multiple ships. An example is NORLANT-72, one of many in the long running and extensive U.S. Navy's Long Range Acoustic Propagation Project (LRAPP), in which sound velocity profiles, bathymetry. deep sound channel axit, critical depth and oceanographic data would be collected in the western North Atlantic Ocean north of 45ºN. The coverage area included the Labrador Sea, Irminger Sea, Baffin Bay, Davis Strait, Denmark Strait, North Atlantic Current, Labrador Current, West Greenland Current, Baffinland Current, Subarctic Convergence and Polar Front with particular attention to the deep sound channel (DSC) axis. Quest, one of six ships, made expendable bathythermograph (XBT) drops north into Baffin Bay. At selected stations Quest deployed a Canadian developed cross-dipole array (CDA) for azimuthal ambient noise directionality measurements and a vertical line array (VLA) for propagation-loss measurements. (Note: The other ships were USNS Sands, USNS Hayes, USNS Lynch, RV Pierce and RV Langevin.)

An example of the work is the ship's support of a 1980s study of acoustic propagation in shallow water over rough and smooth seabeds. Quest installed and monitored an array on the Scotian Shelf where within a few kilometres depth ranged between about 90 and 200 m (300 and 660 ft). The location was selected to cover a boundary between smooth and rough seabed. The array of ten hydrophones had a vertical component suspended by a subsurface float and a horizontal segment along the bottom and then connected to a surface float with radio data link to the ship. Another ship assisted in running designated tracks obtaining data and discharging explosive sound sources.

In February 2003 Quest was in the Eastern Gulf of Mexico to deploy Seaweb, (Note: Not to be confused with SeaWeb nonprofit observation organization.) an undersea acoustic digital network capable of supporting littoral anti-submarine warfare, observation systems and operation of underwater vehicles. During a test designated The Technical Cooperation Program (TTCP) RDS-4 Quset deployed and served as the communications and command center for a grid of six Seaweb repeater nodes and two moored Racom gateway nodes supporting communication and navigation for one Canadian and two U.S. Navy autonomous underwater vehicle (AUV) gliders over seven days continuous operation. In 2008 the ship operated with a single Racom buoy and nineteen nodes in St. Margarets Bay, Nova Scotia during another TTCP exercise.

== End of service ==
As of February 2014, Quest was docked indefinitely at Halifax following budget cutbacks to the Royal Canadian Navy. On 2 September 2016 the Royal Canadian Navy announced through an email release that the ship would be decommissioned and "divested". Contractors to dismantle Quest, along with HMCS Preserver, were sought in March 2017. In June Marine Recycling Corporation of Port Colborne, Ontario secured a CAD$12.6 million contract to dismantle the two ships at their Sydport facility at Sydney, Nova Scotia.

== See also ==
- Fleet of the Royal Canadian Navy
- CCGS Hudson - Survey vessel in the Canadian Coast Guard
