= Inuktitut =

Name of several Inuit languages spoken in Canada

- Eastern Canadian Inuktitut
- ᐃᓄᒃᑎᑐᑦ, inuktitut
- Native to: Canada
- Region: Northwest Territories, Nunatsiavut (Newfoundland and Labrador), Nunavik (Quebec), Nunavut
- Speakers: L1: 38,000 (2021 census); L1 + L2: 42,000 (2021 census)
- Language family: Eskaleut: Eskimo; Inuit (Inuktut); Inuktitut
- Early forms: Proto-Eskimo–Aleut: Proto-Eskimo; Proto-Inuit
- Dialects: Qikiqtaaluk uannangani (North Baffin); Qikiqtaaluk nigiani (South Baffin); Nunavimmiutitut (Quebec); Inuttitut (Labrador); Inuktun (Thule)
- Writing system: Inuktitut syllabics, Inuktitut Braille, Latin

Official status
- Official language in: Nunavut; Northwest Territories
- Recognised minority language in: Quebec (Nunavik); Newfoundland and Labrador (Nunatsiavut); Yukon (Inuvialuit Settlement Region)
- Regulated by: Inuit Tapiriit Kanatami and various other local institutions.

Language codes
- ISO 639-1: iu Inuktitut
- ISO 639-2: iku Inuktitut
- ISO 639-3: iku – inclusive code Inuktitut; Individual codes: ike – Eastern Canadian Inuktitut ikt – Inuinnaqtun
- Glottolog: east2534 Eastern Canadian Inuktitut
- ELP: Inuktitut
- Linguasphere: 60-ABB
- Distribution of Inuit languages across the Arctic. East Inuktitut dialects are those coloured dark blue (on the south of Baffin Island), red, pink, and brown.

- Person: Inuk, ᐃᓄᒃ; Dual: Inuuk, ᐃᓅᒃ
- People: Inuit, ᐃᓄᐃᑦ
- Language: Inuit languages Inuit Sign Language
- Country: Inuit Nunangat, ᐃᓄᐃᑦ ᓄᓇᖓᑦ

Inuktitut (/ɪˈnʊktətʊt/ ih-NUUK-tə-tuut; Inuktitut: [inuktiˈtut], syllabics ᐃᓄᒃᑎᑐᑦ (Note: from inuk 'person' + -titut 'like, in the manner of', lit. 'Personish' or 'Personese')), also known as Eastern Canadian Inuktitut, is one of the principal Inuit languages of Canada. It is spoken in all areas north of the North American arctic tree line, including parts of the provinces of Newfoundland and Labrador, Quebec, to some extent in northeastern Manitoba as well as the Northwest Territories and Nunavut. It is one of the aboriginal languages written with Canadian Aboriginal syllabics.

It is recognized as an official language in Nunavut alongside Inuinnaqtun and both languages are known collectively as Inuktut. Further, it is recognized as one of eight official native tongues in the Northwest Territories. It also has legal recognition in Nunavik—a part of Quebec—thanks in part to the James Bay and Northern Quebec Agreement, and is recognized in the Charter of the French Language as the official language of instruction for Inuit school districts there. It also has some recognition in Nunatsiavut—the Inuit area in Labrador—following the ratification of its agreement with the government of Canada and the province of Newfoundland and Labrador. The 2016 Canadian census reports that 70,540 individuals identify themselves as Inuit, of whom 37,570 self-reported Inuktitut as their mother tongue.

The term Inuktitut is also the name of a macrolanguage and, in that context, also includes Inuvialuktun, and thus nearly all Inuit dialects of Canada. However, Statistics Canada lists all Inuit languages in the Canadian census as Inuktut.

== History ==
=== In the Canadian school system ===
Before contact with Europeans, Inuit learned skills by example and participation. The Inuktitut language provided them with all the vocabulary required to describe traditional practices and natural features. Up to this point, it was solely an oral language. However, European colonialism brought the schooling system to Canada. The missionaries of the Anglican and Roman Catholic churches were the first ones to deliver formal education to Inuit in schools. The teachers used the Inuktitut language for instruction and developed writing systems.

In 1928 the first residential school for Inuit opened, and English became the language of instruction. As the government's interests in the north increased, it started taking over the education of Inuit. After the end of World War II, English was seen as the language of communication in all domains. Officials expressed concerns about the difficulty for Inuit to find employment if they were not able to communicate in English. Inuit were supposed to use English at school, work, and even on the playground. Inuit themselves viewed Inuktitut as the way to express their feelings and be linked to their identity, while English was a tool for making money.

In the 1960s, the European attitude towards the Inuktitut language started to change. Inuktitut was seen as a language worth preserving, and it was argued that knowledge, particularly in the first years of school, is best transmitted in the mother tongue. This set off the beginning of bilingual schools. In 1969, most Inuit voted to eliminate federal schools and replace them with programs by the General Directorate of New Quebec (Direction générale du Nouveau-Québec, DGNQ). Content was now taught in Inuktitut, English, and French.

=== Legislation ===
Inuktitut became one of the official languages in the Northwest Territories in 1984. Its status is secured in the Northwest Territories Official Language Act. With the split of the territory into the NWT and Nunavut in 1999, both territories kept the Language Act. The autonomous area Nunatsiavut in Labrador made Inuktitut the government language when it was formed in 2005. In Nunavik, the James Bay and Northern Quebec Agreement recognizes Inuktitut in the education system.

== Languages and dialects ==
=== Nunavut ===
Nunavut's basic law lists four official languages: English, French, Inuktitut, and Inuinnaqtun. It is ambiguous in state policy to what degree Inuktitut and Inuinnaqtun can be thought of as separate languages. The words Inuktitut, or more correctly Inuktut ('Inuit language') are increasingly used to refer to both Inuinnaqtun and Inuktitut together, or "Inuit languages" in English.

Nunavut is the home of some 24,000 Inuit, over 80% of whom speak Inuktitut. This includes some 3,500 people reported as monolinguals. The 2001 census data shows that the use of Inuktitut, while lower among the young than the elderly, has stopped declining in Canada as a whole and may even be increasing in Nunavut.

The South Baffin dialect (Qikiqtaaluk nigiani, ᕿᑭᖅᑖᓗᒃ ᓂᒋᐊᓂ) is spoken across the southern part of Baffin Island, including the territorial capital Iqaluit. This has in recent years made it a much more widely heard dialect, since a great deal of Inuktitut media originates in Iqaluit. Some linguists also distinguish an East Baffin dialect from either South Baffin or North Baffin dialect, which is an Inuvialuktun dialect.

As of the early 2000s, Nunavut has gradually implemented early childhood, elementary, and secondary school-level immersion programs within its education system to further preserve and promote the Inuktitut language. As of 2012, "Pirurvik, Iqaluit's Inuktitut language training centre, has a new goal: to train instructors from Nunavut communities to teach Inuktitut in different ways and in their own dialects when they return home."

=== Nunavik ===
Quebec is home to roughly 15,800 Inuit, nearly all of whom live in Nunavik. According to the 2021 census, 80.9% of Quebec Inuit speak Inuktitut.

The Nunavik dialect (Nunavimmiutitut, ᓄᓇᕕᒻᒥᐅᑎᑐᑦ) is relatively close to the South Baffin dialect, but not identical. Because of the political and physical boundary between Nunavik and Nunavut, Nunavik has separate government and educational institutions from those in the rest of the Inuktitut-speaking world, resulting in a growing standardization of the local dialect as something separate from other forms of Inuktitut. In the Nunavik dialect, Inuktitut is called Nunavimmiutut (ᓄᓇᕕᒻᒥᐅᑐᑦ). This dialect is also sometimes called Tarramiutut or Taqramiutut (ᑕᕐᕋᒥᐅᑐᑦ or ᑕᖅᕐᕋᒥᐅᑐᑦ).

Sub dialects of Inuktitut in this region include Tarrarmiut and Itivimuit. Itivimuit is associated with Inukjuak, Quebec, and there is an Itivimuit River near the town.

=== Labrador ===
The Nunatsiavut dialect (Inuttitut ᓄᓇᑦᓯᐊᕗᒻᒥᐅᑐᑦ or, often in government documents, Labradorimiutut) was once spoken across northern Labrador. It has a distinct writing system, developed in Greenland in the 1760s by German missionaries from the Moravian Church. This separate writing tradition, the remoteness of Nunatsiavut from other Inuit communities, has made it into a distinct dialect with a separate literary tradition. The Nunatsiavummiut call their language Inuttut (ᐃᓄᑦᑐᑦ).

Although Nunatsiavut claims over 4,000 inhabitants of Inuit descent, only 550 reported Inuktitut to be their native language in the 2001 census, mostly in the town of Nain. Inuktitut is seriously endangered in Labrador.

Nunatsiavut also had a separate dialect reputedly much closer to western Inuktitut dialects, spoken in the area around Rigolet. According to news reports, in 1999 it had only three very elderly speakers.

=== Greenland ===
Though often thought to be a dialect of Greenlandic, Inuktun or Polar Eskimo is a recent arrival in Greenland from the Eastern Canadian Arctic, arriving perhaps as late as the 18th century.

=== Inuit Nunaat and Inuit Nunangat ===
Throughout Inuit Nunaat and Inuit Nunangat the Inuktut is used to refer to Inuktitut and all other dialects.

It is used by Inuit Tapiriit Kanatami, the Inuit Circumpolar Council, and the Government of Nunavut throughout Inuit Nunaat and Inuit Nunangat.

== Phonology ==
Eastern dialects of Inuktitut have fifteen consonants and three vowels (which can be long or short). Consonants are arranged with six places of articulation: bilabial, labiodental, alveolar, palatal, velar and uvular; and three manners of articulation: voiceless stops, voiced continuants and nasals, as well as two additional sounds—voiceless fricatives. Natsilingmiutut has an additional consonant /ɟ/, a vestige of the retroflex consonants of Proto-Inuit. Inuinnaqtun has one less consonant, as /s/ and /ɬ/ have merged into /h/. All dialects of Inuktitut have only three basic vowels and make a phonological distinction between short and long forms of all vowels. In Inuujingajut—Nunavut standard Roman orthography—long vowels are written as a double vowel.

Inuktitut vowels
		IPA	Inuujingajut	Notes
open front unrounded	Short	/a/	a	
open front unrounded	Long	/aː/	aa	
closed front unrounded	Short	/i/	i	Short i is realized as [e] or [ɛ] before uvular consonants [ʁ] and [q]
closed front unrounded	Long	/iː/	ii	
closed back rounded	Short	/u/	u	Short u is realized as [o] or [ɔ] before uvular consonants [ʁ] and [q]
closed back rounded	Long	/uː/	uu	

Inuktitut consonants in Inuujingajut and IPA notation
		Labial	Coronal	Palatal	Velar		Uvular	Glottal
Nasal		m	n		ŋ			
Stop		p	t	ɟ (Note: The voiced palatal stop is absent from many dialects and is not written with a separate letter. If a distinction needs to be made between /j/ and /ɟ/, it is written as r̂.)	k (Note: In the Siglitun dialect, k is always pronounced as a fricative /x/. In other dialects, the fricative realization is possible between vowels or vowels and approximants.)	ɡ (Note: In the Siglitun dialect, g is always pronounced as a fricative /ɣ/. In other dialects, the fricative realization is possible between vowels or vowels and approximants.)	q	
Fricative	plain	v	s		k	ɡ	ʁ (Note: /ʁ/ assimilates [ɴ] before nasals.)	h (Note: /h/ replaces /s/ in Kivallirmiutut and Natsilingmiutut, and replaces both /s/ and /ɬ/ in Inuinnaqtun.)
Fricative	lateral		ɬ					
Approximant			l	j				

All voiceless stops are unaspirated, like in many other languages. The voiceless uvular stop is usually written as q, but sometimes written as r. The voiceless lateral fricative is romanized as ɬ, but is often written as &, or simply as l.

/ŋ/ is spelt as ng, and geminated /ŋ/ is spelt as nng.

== Grammar ==
Inuktitut, like other Eskaleut languages, has a very rich morphological system, in which a succession of different morphemes are added to root words to indicate things that, in languages like English, would require several words to express. (See also: Agglutinative language and Polysynthetic language.) All words begin with a root morpheme to which other morphemes are suffixed. Inuktitut has hundreds of distinct suffixes, in some dialects as many as 700. Inuktitut's morphological system is highly regular.

One example is the word qangatasuukkuvimmuuriaqalaaqtunga (ᖃᖓᑕᓲᒃᑯᕕᒻᒨᕆᐊᖃᓛᖅᑐᖓ) meaning 'I'll have to go to the airport:

Morpheme			Meaning	Morphophonological changes
ᖃᖓᑕ	qangata	verbal root	to raise/to be raised in the air	
ᓲᖅ	suuq	verb-to-noun suffix	one who habitually performs an action; thus qangatasuuq: airplane	-q is deleted
ᒃᑯᑦ	kkut	noun-to-noun suffix	group	-t is deleted
ᕕᒃ	vik	noun-to-noun suffix	enormous; thus qangatasuukkuvik (ᖃᖓᑕᓲᒃᑯᕕᒃ): airport	-k changes to -m
ᒨᖅ	muuq	noun-to-verb suffix	arrival at a place; to go to	-q+ja is deleted
ᔭᕆᐊᖅ	jariaq	verb-to-noun suffix	the obligation to perform an action	-q is deleted
ᖃᖅ	qaq	noun-to-verb suffix	to have	-q is deleted
ᓛᖅ	laaq	verb-to-verb suffix	future tense, will	-q+j changes to -q+t
ᔪᖓ	junga	verb ending	participle, first person singular, I	

== Writing ==
=== Latin alphabets ===
The western part of Nunavut and the Northwest Territories use a Latin alphabet usually called Inuinnaqtun or Qaliujaaqpait, reflecting the predispositions of the missionaries who reached this area in the late 19th century and early 20th.

Moravian missionaries, with the purpose of introducing Inuit to Christianity and the Bible, contributed to the development of an Inuktitut alphabet in Greenland during the 1760s that was based on the Latin script. (This alphabet is distinguished by its inclusion of the letter kra, ĸ.) They later travelled to Labrador in the 1800s, bringing the Inuktitut alphabet with them.

The Alaskan Yupik and Inupiat (who additionally developed their own syllabary) and the Siberian Yupik also adopted Latin alphabets.

=== Qaliujaaqpait ===
In September 2019, a unified orthography called Inuktut Qaliujaaqpait, based on the Latin alphabet without diacritics, was adopted for all varieties of Inuktitut by the national organization Inuit Tapiriit Kanatami, after eight years of work. It was developed by Inuit to be used by speakers of any dialect from any region, and can be typed on electronic devices without specialized keyboard layouts. It does not replace syllabics, and people from the regions are not required to stop using their familiar writing systems. Implementation plans are to be established for each region. It includes letters such as ff, ch, and rh, the sounds for which exist in some dialects but do not have standard equivalents in syllabics. It establishes a standard alphabet but not spelling or grammar rules. Long vowels are written by doubling the vowel (e.g., aa, ii, uu). The apostrophe represents a glottal stop when after a vowel (e.g., maꞌna), or separates an n from an ng (e.g., avin'ngaq) or an r from an rh (e.g., qar'rhuk).

Inuktut Qaliujaaqpait
IPA	Consonant	a	i	u
p	p	pa	pi	pu
t	t	ta	ti	tu
k	k	ka	ki	ku
q	q	qa	qi	qu
s	s	sa	si	su
ɬ	hl	hla	hli	hlu
ʂ	shr	shra	shri	shru
h	h	ha	hi	hu
v	v	va	vi	vu
l	l	la	li	lu
ɟ	rh	rha	rhi	rhu
j	j	ja	ji	ju
g	g	ga	gi	gu
ʁ	r	ra	ri	ru
m	m	ma	mi	mu
n	n	na	ni	nu
ŋ	ng	nga	ngi	ngu
ŋŋ	nng	nnga	nngi	nngu
ʔ	ꞌ	aꞌ	iꞌ	uꞌ

The syllabary used to write Inuktitut (titirausiq nutaaq). The extra characters with the dots represent long vowels; in the Latin transcription, the vowel would be doubled.

In April 2012, with the completion of the Old Testament, the first complete Bible in Inuktitut, translated by native speakers, was published.

Noted literature in Inuktitut has included the novels Harpoon of the Hunter by Markoosie Patsauq, and Sanaaq by Mitiarjuk Nappaaluk.

=== The Canadian syllabary (Qaniujaaqpait) ===
Most Inuktitut in Nunavut and Nunavik is written using a scheme called Qaniujaaqpait (ᖃᓂᐅᔮᖅᐸᐃᑦ) or Inuktitut syllabics, based on Canadian Aboriginal syllabics.

In the 1860s, missionaries imported this system of Qaniujaaqpait, which is based on the Cree syllabary devised by the missionary James Evans. The Netsilik Inuit in Kugaaruk and north Baffin Island adopted Qaniujaaqpait by the 1920s.

The present form of the syllabary for Canadian Inuktitut was adopted by the Inuit Cultural Institute in Canada in the 1970s. Inuit in Alaska, Inuvialuit, Inuinnaqtun speakers, and Inuit in Greenland and Labrador use Latin alphabets.

Though conventionally called a syllabary, the writing system has been classified by some observers as an abugida, since syllables starting with the same consonant have related glyphs rather than unrelated ones.

All of the characters needed for the Inuktitut syllabary are available in the Unicode block Unified Canadian Aboriginal Syllabics. The territorial government of Nunavut, Canada, has developed TrueType fonts called Pigiarniq (ᐱᒋᐊᕐᓂᖅ [pi.ɡi.aʁ.ˈniq]), Uqammaq (ᐅᖃᒻᒪᖅ [u.qam.maq]), and Euphemia (ᐅᕓᒥᐊ [u.vai.mi.a]) for computer displays. They were designed by Vancouver-based Tiro Typeworks. Apple Macintosh computers include an Inuktitut IME (Input Method Editor) as part of keyboard language options. Linux distributions provide locale and language support for Iñupiaq, Kalaallisut and Inuktitut.

=== Braille ===
In 2012 Tamara Kearney, Manager of Braille Research and Development at the Commonwealth Braille and Talking Book Cooperative, developed a Braille code for the Inuktitut language syllabics. This code is based on representing the syllabics' orientation. Machine translation from Unicode UTF-8 and UTF-16 can be performed using the Liblouis Braille translation system which includes an Inuktitut Braille translation table. The book ᐃᓕᐊᕐᔪᒃ ᓇᓄᕐᓗ (The Orphan and the Polar Bear) became the first work ever translated into Inuktitut Braille, and a copy is held at the headquarters of the Nunavut Public Library Services at Baker Lake.

== See also ==
- Indigenous languages of the Americas
- Thule people

== Bibliography ==
- Mallon, Mick. "Inuktitut Linguistics for Technocrats". Inuktitutcomputing.ca.
- Mallon, Mick (1991). Introductory Inuktitut. Arctic College-McGill University Inuktitut Text Project. ISBN 0-7717-0230-2.
- Mallon, Mick (1991). Introductory Inuktitut Reference Grammar. Arctic College-McGill University Inuktitut Text Project. ISBN 0-7717-0235-3.
- Spalding, Alex (1998). Inuktitut: A multi-dialectal outline dictionary (with an Aivilingmiutaq base). Nunavut Arctic College. ISBN 1-896204-29-5.
- Spalding, Alex (1992). Inuktitut: a Grammar of North Baffin Dialects. Wuerz. ISBN 0-920063-43-8.
- "The Inuktitut Language". Project Naming | the identification of Inuit portrayed in photographic collections at Library and Archives Canada. Collectionscanada.ca. Archived from the original on 23 January 2018.
- "Arctic Languages: An Awakening" (PDF). (2.68 MB), ed: Dirmid R. F. Collis. ISBN 92-3-102661-5.

Although as many of the examples as possible are novel or extracted from Inuktitut texts, some of the examples in this article are drawn from Introductory Inuktitut and Inuktitut Linguistics for Technocrats.

Indigenous languages of the Americas with Wikipedia
Item	Label/en	native label	Code	distribution map	number of speakers, writers, or signers	UNESCO language status	Ethnologue language status	?itemwiki
Q36806	Southern Quechua	qu:Urin Qichwa qu:Qhichwa qu:Qichwa	qu		6000000	2 vulnerable		Quechua Wikipedia
Q35876	Guarani	gn:Avañe'ẽ	gn		4850000	1 safe	1 National	Guarani Wikipedia
Q4627	Aymara	ay:Aymar aru	ay		4000000	2 vulnerable		Aymara Wikipedia
Q13300	Nahuatl	nah:Nawatlahtolli nah:nawatl nah:mexkatl	nah		1925620	2 vulnerable		Nahuatl Wikipedia
Q891085	Wayuu	guc:Wayuunaiki	guc		300000	2 vulnerable	5 Developing	Wayuu Wikipedia
Q33730	Mapudungun	arn:Mapudungun	arn		300000	3 definitely endangered	6b Threatened	Mapuche Wikipedia
Q13310	Navajo	nv:Diné bizaad nv:Diné	nv		169369	2 vulnerable	6b Threatened	Navajo Wikipedia
Q25355	Greenlandic	kl:Kalaallisut	kl		56200	2 vulnerable	1 National	Greenlandic Wikipedia
Q29921	Inuktitut	ike-cans:ᐃᓄᒃᑎᑐᑦ iu:Inuktitut	iu		39770	2 vulnerable		Inuktitut Wikipedia
Q33388	Cherokee	chr:ᏣᎳᎩ ᎧᏬᏂᎯᏍᏗ chr:ᏣᎳᎩ	chr		12300	4 severely endangered	8a Moribund	Cherokee Wikipedia
Q33390	Cree	cr:ᐃᔨᔨᐤ ᐊᔨᒧᐎᓐ' cr:nēhiyawēwin	cr		10875; 8040			Cree Wikipedia
Q32979	Choctaw	cho:Chahta anumpa cho:Chahta	cho		9200	2 vulnerable	6b Threatened	Choctaw Wikipedia
Q56590	Atikamekw	atj:Atikamekw Nehiromowin atj:Atikamekw	atj		6160	2 vulnerable	5 Developing	Atikamekw Wikipedia
Q27183	Iñupiaq	ik:Iñupiatun	ik		5580	4 severely endangered		Inupiat Wikipedia
Q523014	Muscogee	mus:Mvskoke	mus		4300	3 definitely endangered	7 Shifting	Muscogee Wikipedia
Q33265	Cheyenne	chy:Tsêhesenêstsestôtse	chy		2400	3 definitely endangered	8a Moribund	Cheyenne Wikipedia
