= Timeline of European exploration =

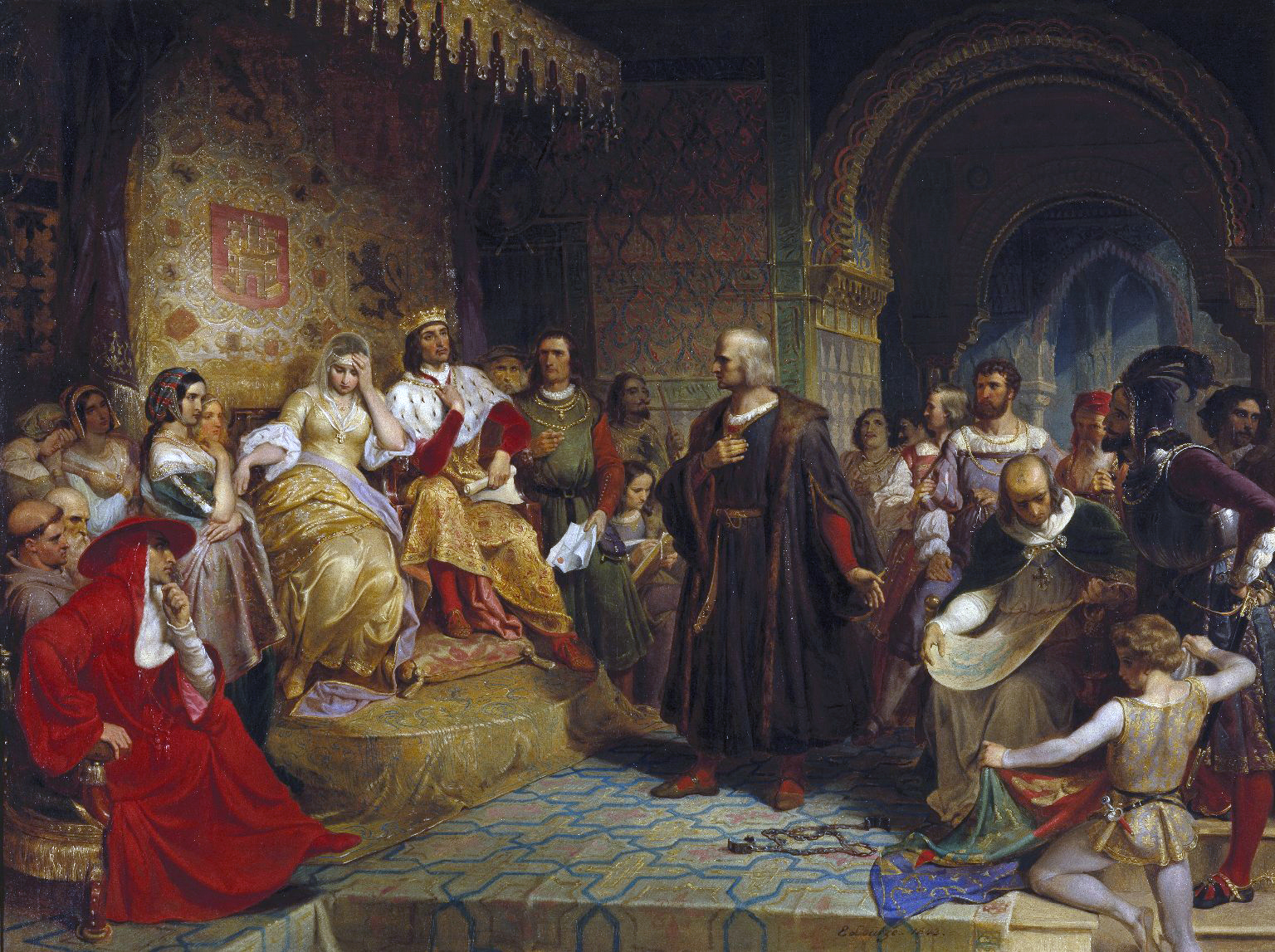
Columbus before the Queen, imagined by Emanuel Gottlieb Leutze, 1843

This timeline of European exploration lists major geographic discoveries and other firsts credited to or involving Europeans during the Age of Discovery and the following centuries, between the years AD 1418 and 1957.

Despite several significant transoceanic and transcontinental explorations by European civilizations in the preceding centuries, the precise geography of the Earth outside of Europe was largely unknown to Europeans before the 15th century, when technological advances (especially in sea travel) as well as the rise of colonialism, mercantilism, and a host of other social, cultural, and economic changes made it possible to organize large-scale exploratory expeditions to uncharted parts of the globe.

The Age of Discovery arguably began in the early 15th century with the rounding of the feared Cape Bojador and Portuguese exploration of the west coast of Africa, while in the last decade of the century the Spanish sent expeditions far across the Atlantic, where the Americas would eventually be reached, and the Portuguese found a sea route to India. In the 16th century, various European states funded expeditions to the interior of both North and South America, as well as to their respective west and east coasts, north to California and Labrador and south to Chile and Tierra del Fuego. In the 17th century, Russian explorers conquered Siberia in search of sables, while the Dutch contributed greatly to the charting of Australia. The 18th century witnessed the first extensive explorations of the South Pacific and Oceania and the exploration of Alaska, while the 19th was dominated by exploration of the polar regions and excursions into the heart of Africa. By the early 20th century, the poles themselves had been reached.

== 15th century ==
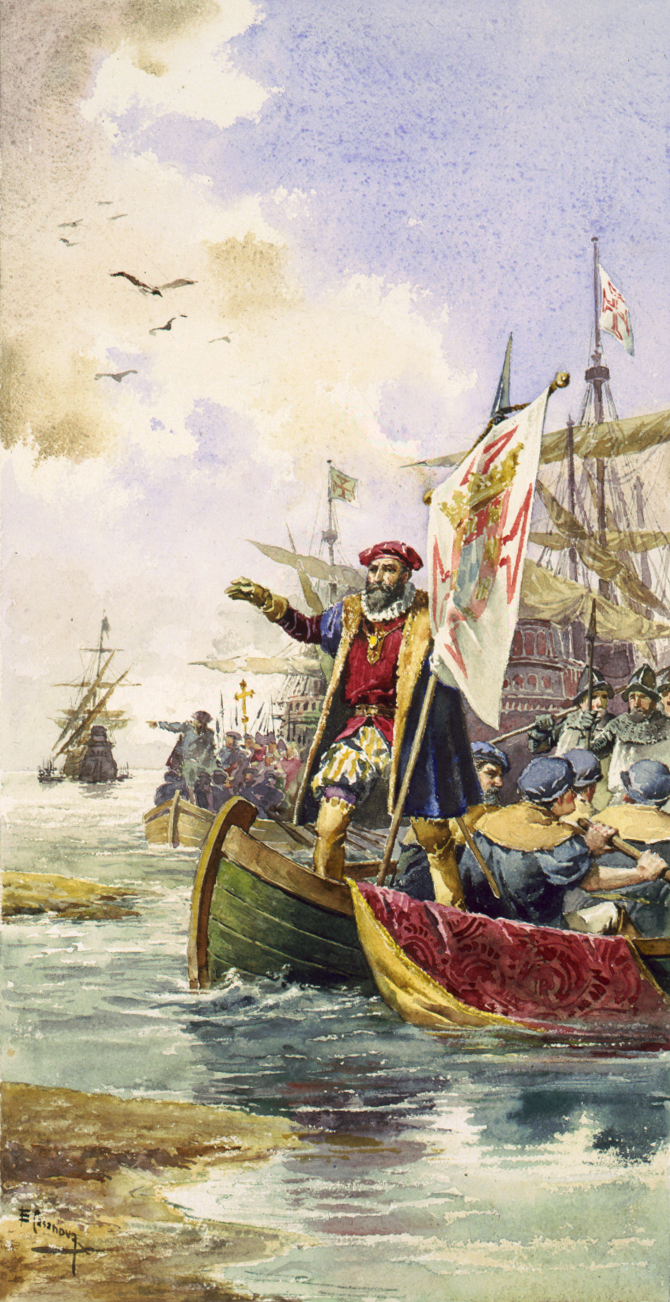
Vasco da Gama lands at Calicut, illustration for Os Lusíadas, 1880 by Ernesto Casanova

- 1402 - Castilian colonization of the Canary Islands began with the expedition of the French explorers Jean de Béthencourt and Gadifer de la Salle, nobles and vassals of Henry III of Castile, to Lanzarote
- 1418 – Portuguese explorers João Gonçalves Zarco and Tristão Vaz Teixeira discover Porto Santo Island in the Madeira archipelago.
- 1419 – Gonçalves and Vaz discover the main island of Madeira.
- 1431 – Diogo de Silves discovers the Azores.
- 1434 – Gil Eanes passes Cabo de Não and becomes the first confirmed person to sail beyond Cape Bojador and return alive.
- 1444 – Dinis Dias reaches the mouth of the Senegal River.
- 1446 – The Portuguese reach the mainland peninsula of Cape Verde and the Gambia River.
- 1456 – Alvise Cadamosto and Diogo Gomes discover the Cape Verde Islands, 560 kilometres (350 mi) west of the Cape Verde peninsula.
- 1460 – Pêro de Sintra reaches Sierra Leone.
- 1470 – Cape Palmas is passed.
- 1472 – Fernão do Pó lands on the island of Bioko.
- 1473 – Lopo Gonçalves is the first European sailor to cross the Equator.
- 1474–75 – Ruy de Sequeira discovers São Tomé and Príncipe.
- 1482 – Diogo Cão reaches the Congo River, where he erects a padrão ("pillar of stone").
- 1485–86 – Cão reaches Cape Cross, where he erects his last padrão.
- 1487–92 – Pêro da Covilhã travels to Arabia, to the mouth of the Red Sea, and then eastward by sail to the Malabar Coast (visiting Calicut and Goa on the Indian subcontinent). He later sails south along the east coast of Africa, visiting the trading stations of Mombasa, Zanzibar, and Sofala; on his return journey he visits Mecca and Medina before reaching Ethiopia in search of the mythical Prester John.
- 1488 – Bartolomeu Dias rounds the "Cape of Storms" (Cape of Good Hope), at the southernmost tip of the African continent.
- 1492 – Under the patronage of the Catholic Monarchs of Spain, Italian explorer Christopher Columbus explores the Bahamas, Cuba, and "Española" (Hispaniola), which are only later recognized as part of the New World.
- 1493–94 – On his second voyage to the Americas, Columbus reaches Dominica and Guadeloupe, among other islands of the Lesser Antilles, as well as Puerto Rico and Jamaica.
- 1497 – Under the commission of Henry VII of England, Italian explorer John Cabot explores Newfoundland.
- 1497–98 – Vasco da Gama sails to India and back.
- 1498 – On his third voyage to the Americas, Christopher Columbus reaches mainland South America.
- 1499 – Spanish explorer Alonso de Ojeda explores the South American mainland from about Cayenne (in modern French Guiana) to Cabo de la Vela (in modern Colombia), reaching the mouth of the Orinoco River and entering Lake Maracaibo.
- 1499 – Italian explorer Amerigo Vespucci explores the mouth of the Amazon River and reaches 6°S latitude, in present-day northern Brazil.
- 1499 – João Fernandes Lavrador, together with Pêro de Barcelos, sight Labrador.
- 1499 – Gaspar and Miguel Corte-Real reach and map Greenland.

== 16th century ==
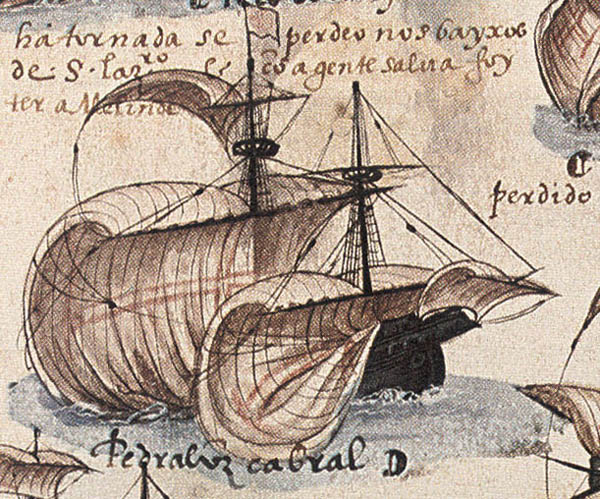
Pedro Álvares Cabral's ship on the fleet that sighted the Brazilian mainland for the first time on 22 April 1500. From the manuscript Memória das Armadas que de Portugal passaram à Índia

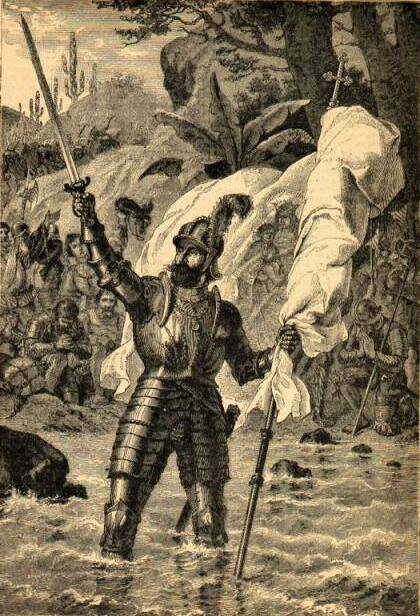
Vasco Núñez de Balboa claiming possession of the Mar del Sur ("South Sea").

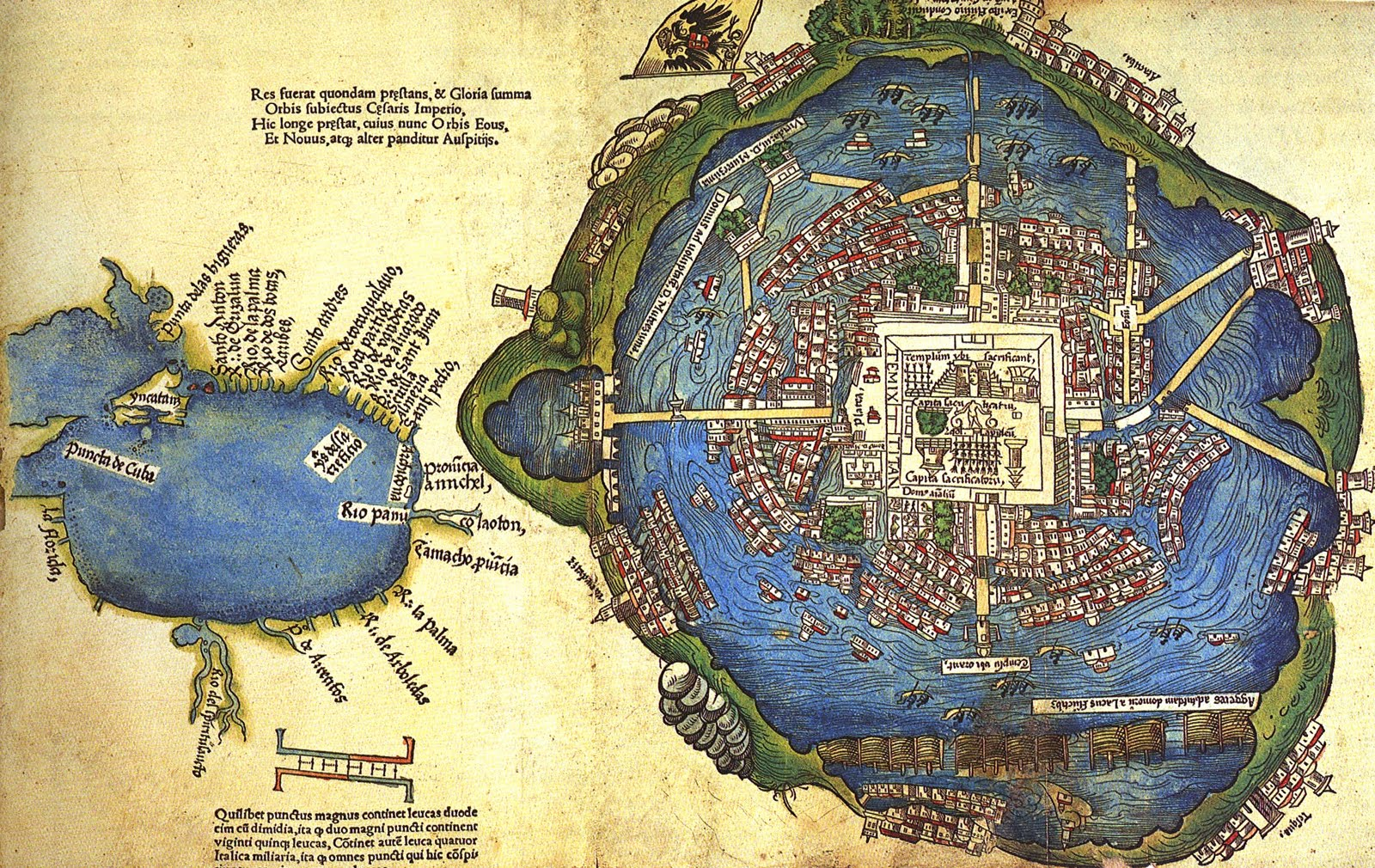
Map of the island city Tenochtitlán and Mexico gulf made by one of Hernán Cortés' men, 1524, Newberry Library, Chicago

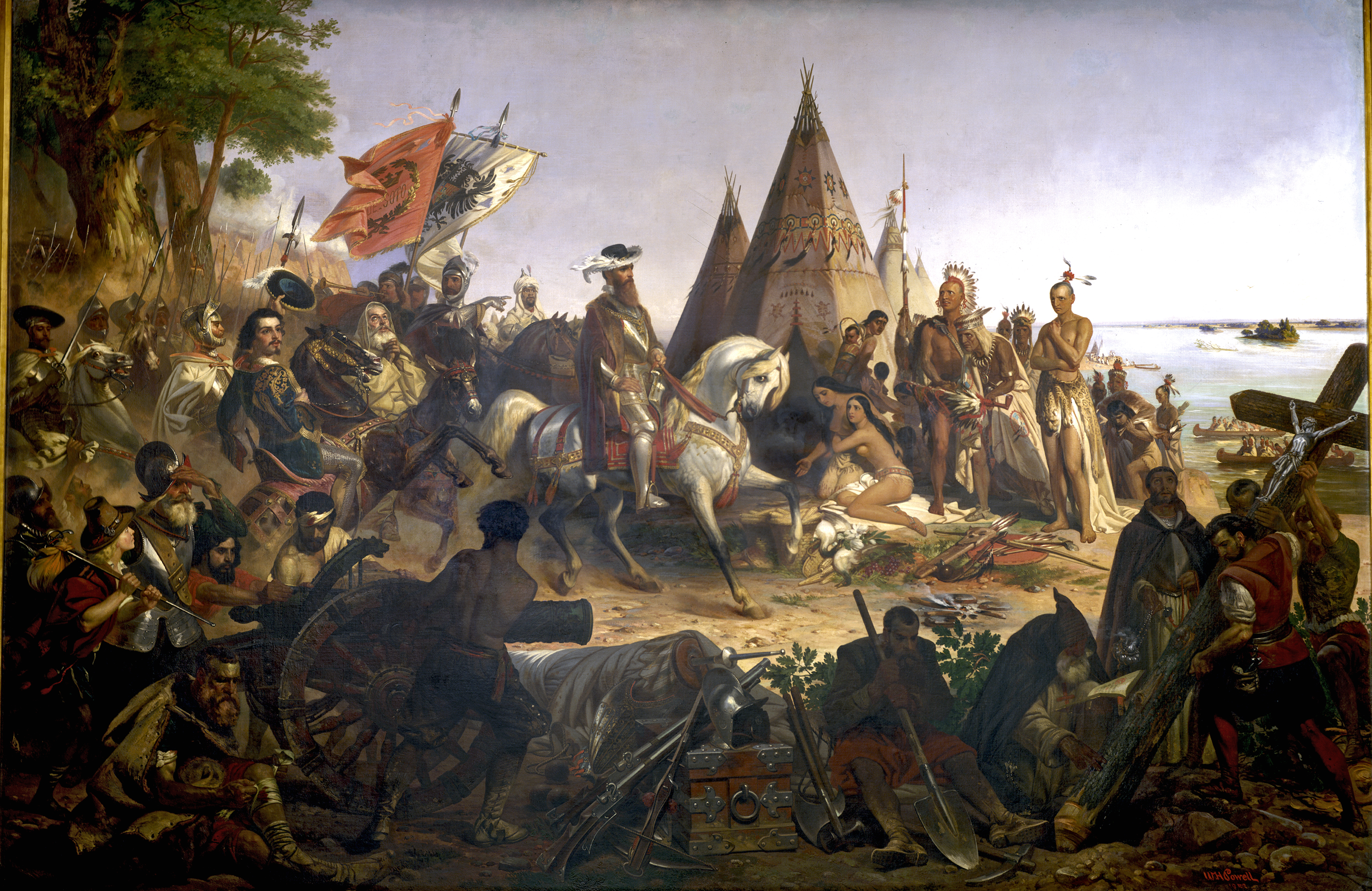
Discovery of the Mississippi by William H. Powell (1823–1879) is a Romantic depiction of de Soto seeing the Mississippi River for the first time. It hangs in the United States Capitol rotunda.

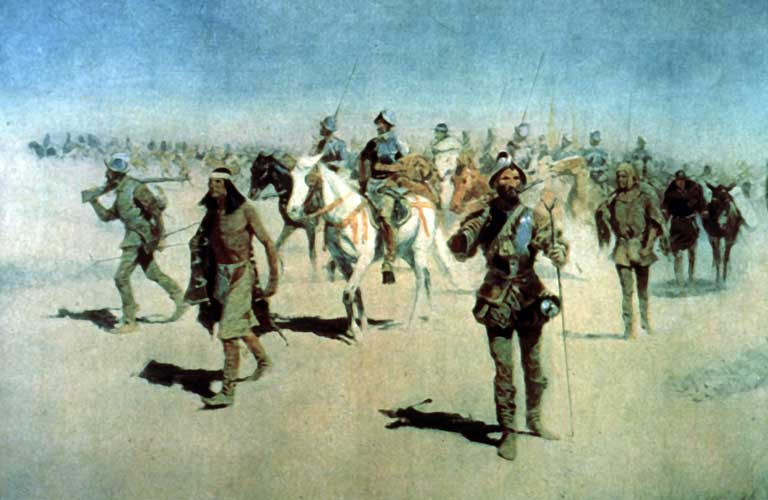
Francisco Vásquez de Coronado Sets Out to the North, by Frederic Remington, 1861–1909

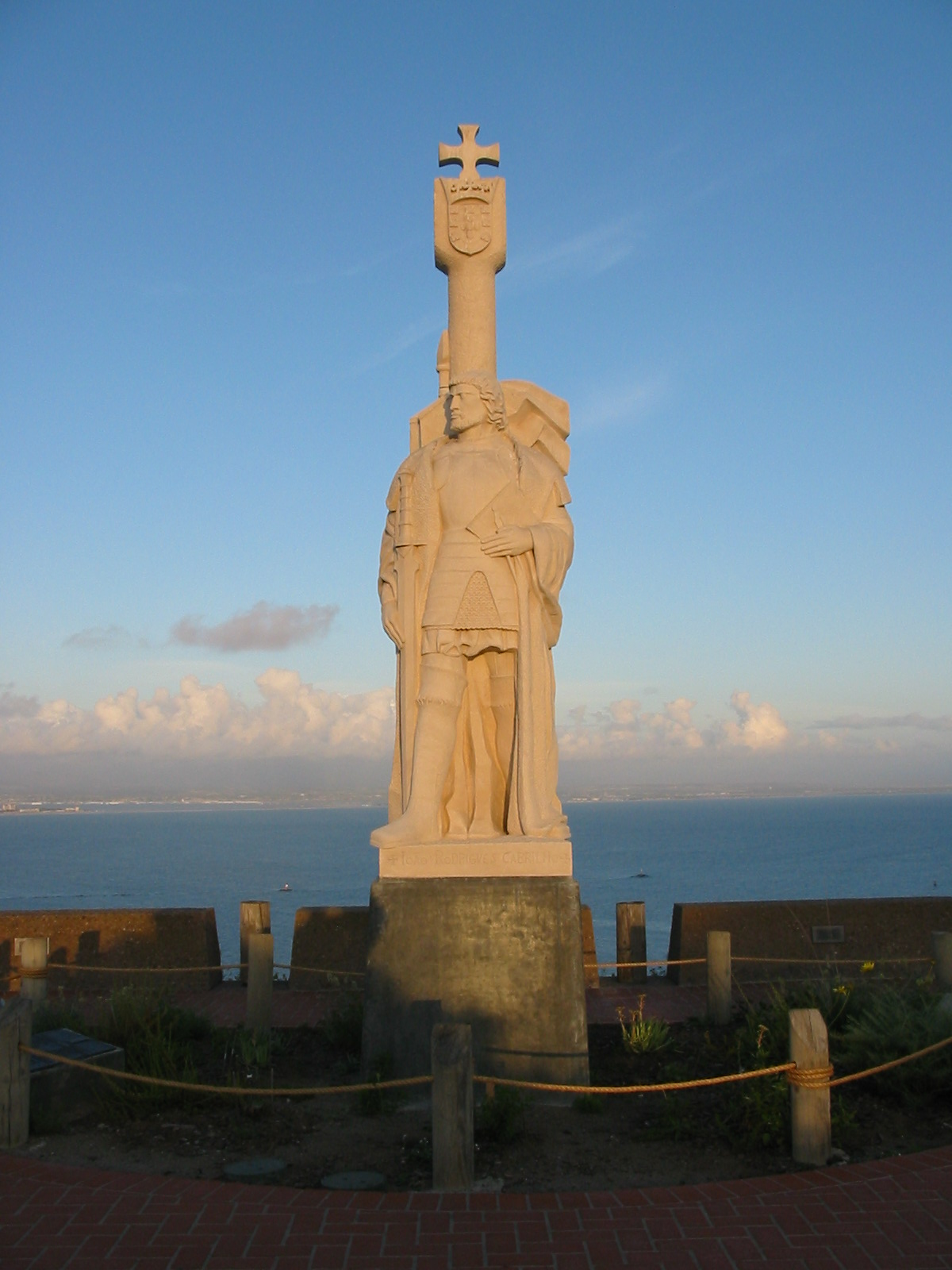
Cabrillo National Monument in San Diego, California

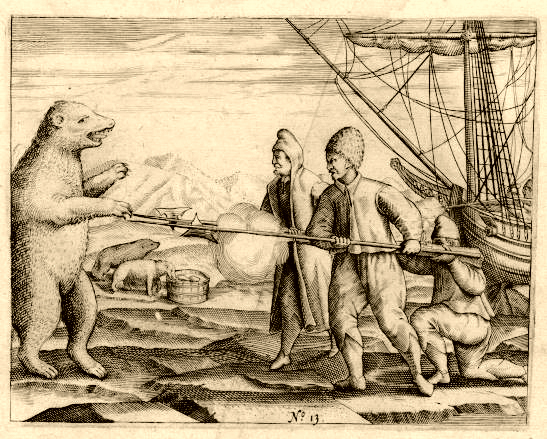
Crew of Willem Barentsz fighting a polar bear, 1596

- 1500 – Vicente Yáñez Pinzón reaches the northeast coast of what today is Brazil at a cape he names "Santa Maria de la Consolación" (Cabo de Santo Agostinho) and sails fifty miles up a river he names the "Marañón" (Amazon).
- 1500 – Pedro Álvares Cabral makes the "official" discovery of Brazil, leading the first expedition that united Europe, America, Africa, and Asia.
- 1500 – João Fernandes reaches Cape Farewell, Greenland ("Terra do Lavrador", or Land of the Husbandman).
- 1500–02 – Gaspar and Miguel Corte Real explore and name the coasts of "Terra Verde" (likely Newfoundland) and Labrador.
- 1500–01 – Diogo Dias reaches Madagascar and reaches the gate of the Red Sea, the Bab-el-Mandeb Strait.
- 1500 – Rodrigo de Bastidas explores the Colombian coast from Cabo de la Vela to the Gulf of Urabá.
- 1501–02 – Gonçalo Coelho reaches "Rio de Janeiro" (Guanabara Bay).
- 1502–03 – On his fourth voyage to the Americas, Christopher Columbus explores the North American mainland from Guanaja off modern Honduras to the present-day border of Panama and Colombia.
- 1505 – Juan de Bermúdez discovers Bermuda.
- 1506 – Lourenço de Almeida reaches the Maldives and Sri Lanka.
- 1506 – Tristão da Cunha discovers the remote island of Tristan da Cunha in the South Atlantic Ocean.
- 1509 – Diogo Lopes de Sequeira reaches Sumatra and Malacca.
- 1511 – Duarte Fernandes leads a diplomatic mission to Ayutthaya Kingdom (Siam or Thailand).
- 1511 – Rui Nunes da Cunha leads a diplomatic mission to Pegu (Burma or Myanmar).
- 1511–12 – João de Lisboa and Estevão de Fróis explore the "Cape of Santa Maria" (Punta Del Este) in the River Plate, exploring its estuary, and traveling as far south as the Gulf of San Matias at 42ºS, in present-day Uruguay and Argentina (penetrating 300 km (186 mi) "around the Gulf").
- 1511–12 – António de Abreu sails through the Strait of Malacca, between Sumatra and Bangka, and along the coasts of Java, Bali, Lombok, Sumbawa, and Flores to the "Spice Islands" (Maluku).
- 1513 – Jorge Álvares becomes the first European to reach China by sea, landing on Nei Lingding Island at the Pearl River Delta.
- 1513 – Vasco Núñez de Balboa crosses the Isthmus of Panama and reaches the Bay of San Miguel, reaching the "Mar del Sur" (Pacific Ocean).
- 1513 – Juan Ponce de León explores "La Florida" (Florida) and the Yucatán.
- 1514–15 – António Fernandes reaches present-day Zimbabwe.
- 1515 – Gonzalo de Badajoz crosses the Isthmus of Panama at the site of Nombre de Dios, reaching as far as the interior of the Azuero Peninsula.
- 1516 – Juan Díaz de Solís explores the River Plate estuary and names it "La Mar Dulce" ("The Fresh-Water Sea").
- 1516 – Portuguese traders land in Da Nang, Champa, naming it Cochinchina (modern Vietnam).
- 1518 – Lourenço Gomes reaches Borneo.
- 1518 – Juan de Grijalva explores the Mexican coast from "Patouchan" (Champotón) to just north of the Pánuco River.
- 1519 – Hernán Cortés travels from Villa Rica de la Vera Cruz to the Aztec capital of Tenochtitlan on Lake Texcoco.
- 1519 – Alonzo Alvarez de Pineda sails around the Gulf of Mexico to the Pánuco, proving its insularity; also reaches the "Father of Waters" (the Mississippi).
- 1519 – Gaspar de Espinosa sails west along the west coasts of modern Panama and Costa Rica as far as the Gulf of Nicoya.
- 1519–22 – Ferdinand Magellan's expedition reaches the Maluku Islands travelling westward, discovering the Strait of All Saints and crossing the Pacific Ocean. Later, Juan Sebastian Elcano, a member of the tripulation, is elected captain after Magellan's death and completes the first circumnavigation of the globe.
- 1520–21 – João Alvares Fagundes explores Burgeo and Saint Pierre and Miquelon in Newfoundland, and Nova Scotia.
- 1521 – Francisco Gordillo and Pedro de Quexos find the mouth of a river they name "Rio de San Juan Bautista" (perhaps Winyah Bay at the mouth of the Pee Dee River in modern South Carolina).
- 1521 – Cristóvão Jacques explores the Plate River and explores the Parana River, entering it for about 23 leagues (around 140 km), to near the present city of Rosario.
- 1522 – Gil González Dávila explores inland from the Gulf of Nicoya, reaching Lake Nicaragua, while his pilot Andrés Niño explores along the coast to the west, reaching the Gulf of Fonseca and perhaps reaching as far as the southwestern coast of modern Guatemala.
- 1524 – Under the commission of Francis I of France, Italian explorer Giovanni da Verrazzano explores the eastern seaboard of the present-day United States from about Cape Fear to Maine. He also explores the mouth of the Hudson River.
- c. 1524 – Aleixo Garcia travels westward from Santa Catarina, across the Paraná River (perhaps sighting Iguazu Falls) to the Paraguay River near the site of Asunción, then across the Gran Chaco to the Andes and the Inca frontier, somewhere between Mizque and Tomina in modern Bolivia.
- 1524–25 – Francisco Pizarro and Diego de Almagro explore from Punta Piña (7°56’N) on the southern coast of Panama to the San Juan River (4°N), on the west coast of Colombia.
- 1525 – Estêvão Gomes probes Penobscot Bay, Maine.
- 1525 – The Portuguese reach "Celebes" (Sulawesi).
- 1525 – Diogo da Rocha and Gomes de Sequeira explore the Caroline Islands.
- 1526 – Alonso de Salazar reaches the Marshall Islands (Bokak Atoll).
- 1526–28 – Pizarro and his pilot Bartolomé Ruiz explore the west coast of South America from the San Juan River south to the Santa River (about 9°S), becoming the first Europeans to sight the coasts of Ecuador and Peru.
- 1526–27 – Jorge de Menezes reaches New Guinea.
- 1527–28 – Sebastian Cabot explores several hundred miles up the Paraná River, past its confluence with the Paraguay.
- 1528 – Diogo Rodrigues explores the Mascarene Islands (which he names after Pedro Mascarenhas), naming the islands of Réunion, Mauritius, and Rodrigues.
- 1528–36 – Álvar Núñez Cabeza de Vaca and three others are the only survivors of a group of several hundred colonists who travel from the coast of western Florida to the Rio Sinaloa in northern Mexico, where they encounter Spanish slavers.
- 1531 – Diego de Ordaz ascends the Orinoco to the Atures rapids, just past its confluence with the Meta.
- 1532–33 – Pizarro explores and conquers inland to Cajamarca and Cuzco.
- 1533 – Fortún Ximénez finds the tip of Baja California.
- 1534 – Jacques Cartier explores the Gulf of St. Lawrence, discovering Anticosti Island and Prince Edward Island.
- 1535 – Fray Tomás de Berlanga explores the Galapagos Islands.
- 1535 – Cartier ascends "La Grande Rivière" or "La Rivière de Hochelaga" (the St. Lawrence River) to the village of Hochelaga (present-day Montreal).
- 1535–37 – Diego de Almagro leads en expedition from Cuzco to the south, taking the Inca highway to the southwest shore of Lake Titicaca, through the altiplano and the Salta valley to Copiapó; a detachment continues south to the Maule River. Almagro takes the coastal route back, through the Atacama Desert.
- 1539 – Francisco de Ulloa sails to the head of the Gulf of California and around Baja California to Cedros Island, establishing that Baja is a peninsula.
- 1539–43 – An expedition led by Hernando de Soto explores much of the present-day Southern United States, becoming the first to cross the Appalachians (over the Blue Ridge Mountains) and the Mississippi River.
- 1540–42 – Francisco Vásquez de Coronado travels overland from Mexico in search of the mythical Seven Cities of Cibola, only to find villages of mud and thatch in what is now the Southwestern United States. He sends out smaller parties, one of which, under García López de Cárdenas, explores the Grand Canyon; another reports the discovery of a city of gold called Quivira (in modern Kansas), which Coronado later visits – although he finds no gold.
- 1540 – Hernando de Alarcón ascends the Colorado River to the confluence of the Gila River (near present-day Yuma, Arizona).
- 1541–42 – Francisco de Orellana sails down the length of the Amazon River.
- 1542–43 – Juan Rodriguez Cabrillo explores the coasts of modern Baja and California from Punta Baja to the Russian River, reaching the Channel Islands; after his death, his second-in-command, Bartolomé Ferrer, reaches Point Arena.
- 1542 or 1543 – Fernão Mendes Pinto, António Mota and Francisco Zeimoto reach Tanegashima, Japan.
- 1543 – Ruy López de Villalobos discovers three islands (Fais, Ulithi and Yap) in the Carolines and eight atolls (Kwajalein, Lae, Ujae, Wotho, Likiep, Wotje, Erikub and Maloelap) in the Marshall Islands.
- 1543 – Jean Alfonce explores up the Saguenay River, believing it to be "la mer du Cattay".
- 1553 – Hugh Willoughby seeks a Northeast Passage over Russia; reaches either Kolguyev Island or Novaya Zemlya.
- 1556 – Steven Borough reaches as far as Kara Strait, between Novaya Zemlya and Vaygach Island.
- 1557–59 – Juan Fernández Ladrillero and Cortés Hojea explore the Chilean coast from Valdivia (39° 48’ S) to Canal Santa Barbara (54° S); the former passes through the western entrance of the Strait of Magellan to its eastern entrance and back.
- 1565 – Miguel López de Legazpi discovers Mejit, Ailuk and Jemo in the Marshall Islands, while his subordinate Alonso de Arellano discovers Lib in the same island group, as well as five islands (Oroluk, Chuuk, Pulap, Sorol and Ngulu) in the Caroline Islands.
- 1568 – Álvaro de Mendaña reaches the Solomon Islands.
- 1576 – Martin Frobisher discovers "Meta Incognita" ("the unknown bourne"; Baffin Island) and what he believes to be a passage to Cathay: "Frobishers Streytes" (Frobisher Bay).
- 1577–80 – Sir Francis Drake completes the second circumnavigation of the globe.
- 1578 – Frobisher sails part way up the "Mistaken Straites" (Hudson Strait).
- 1581–82 – Yermak Timofeyevich and his men cross the Ural Mountains and reach as far as Isker on the banks of the Irtysh (near modern Tobolsk).
- 1585 – John Davis explores Davis Strait, reaching 66°40′ N; also sails up Cumberland Sound, thinking it to be a "passage to Cathay".
- 1587 – Davis sails up the west coast of Greenland as far as 72°46′ N (about modern Upernavik).
- 1589 – João da Gama reaches "Yezo" (Hokkaido).
- 1592 – Davis discovers the Falkland Islands.
- 1595 – Mendaña discovers the Marquesas.
- 1596 – Willem Barentsz discovers Spitsbergen.

== 17th century ==
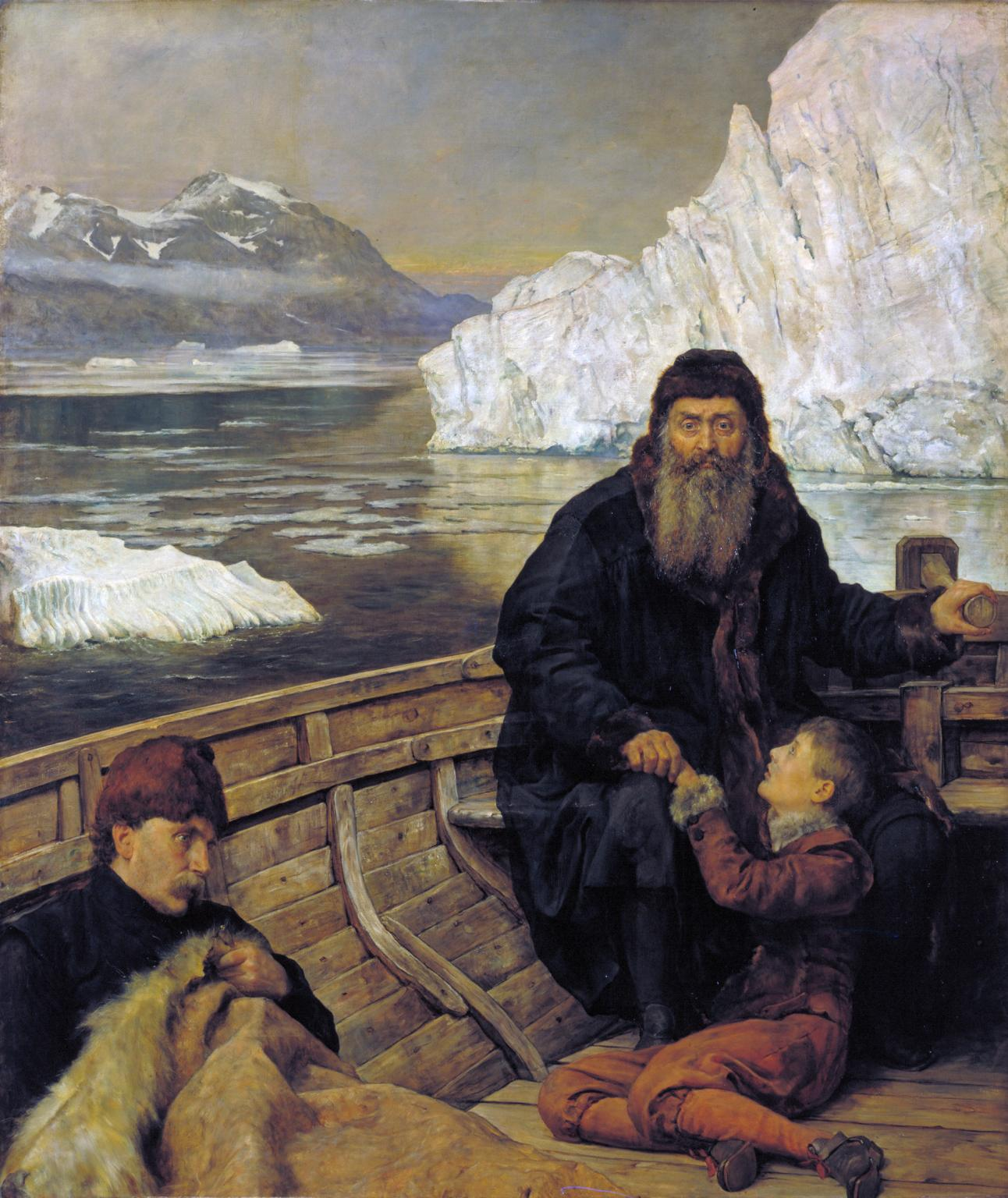
The Last Voyage of Henry Hudson, John Collier's 1881 painting of Henry Hudson cast adrift.

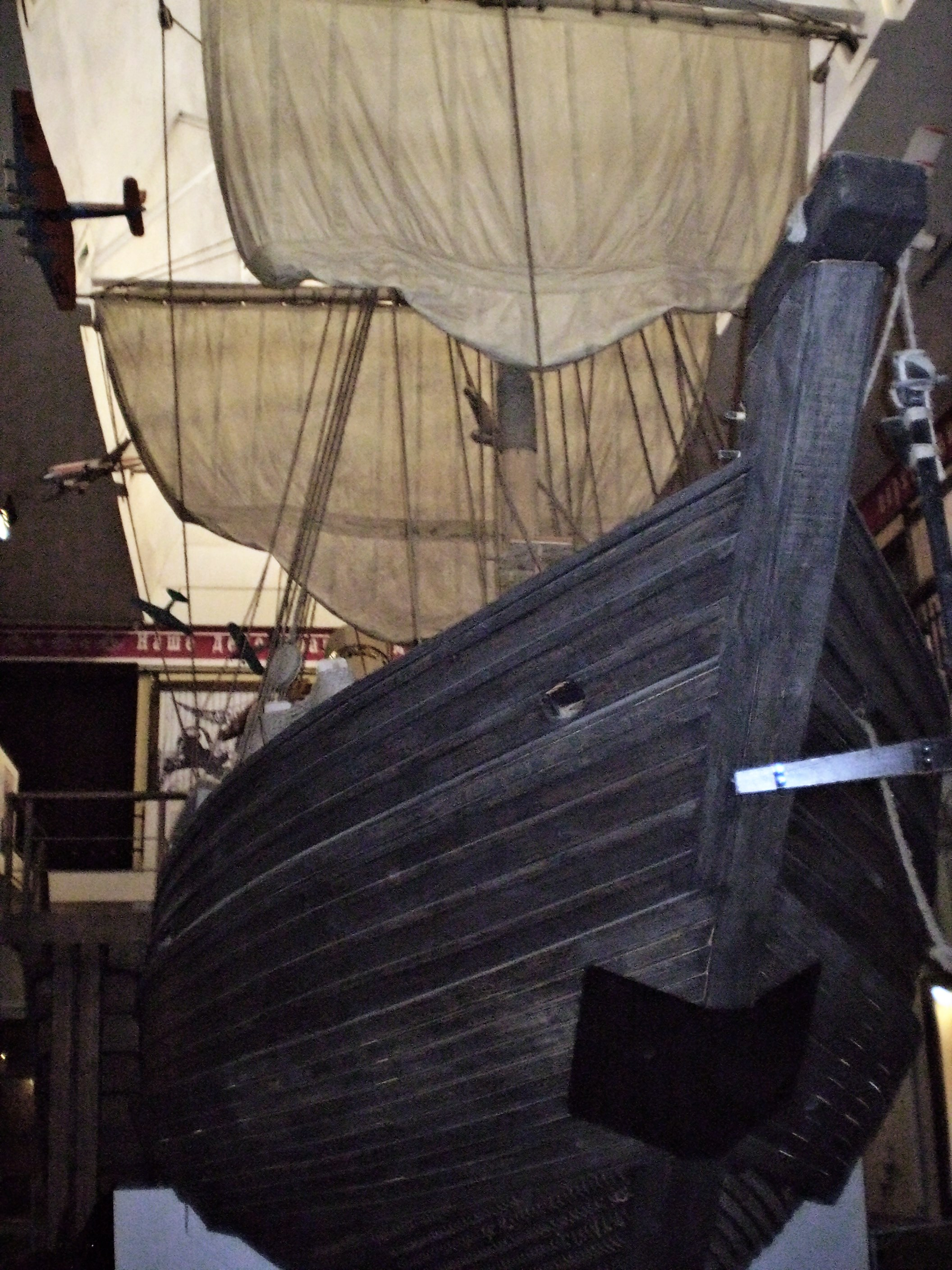
A 17th-century koch in a museum in Krasnoyarsk. Kochi were used to explore the Siberian watershed and coasts by men such as Kurochkin, Perfilyev and Dezhnev.

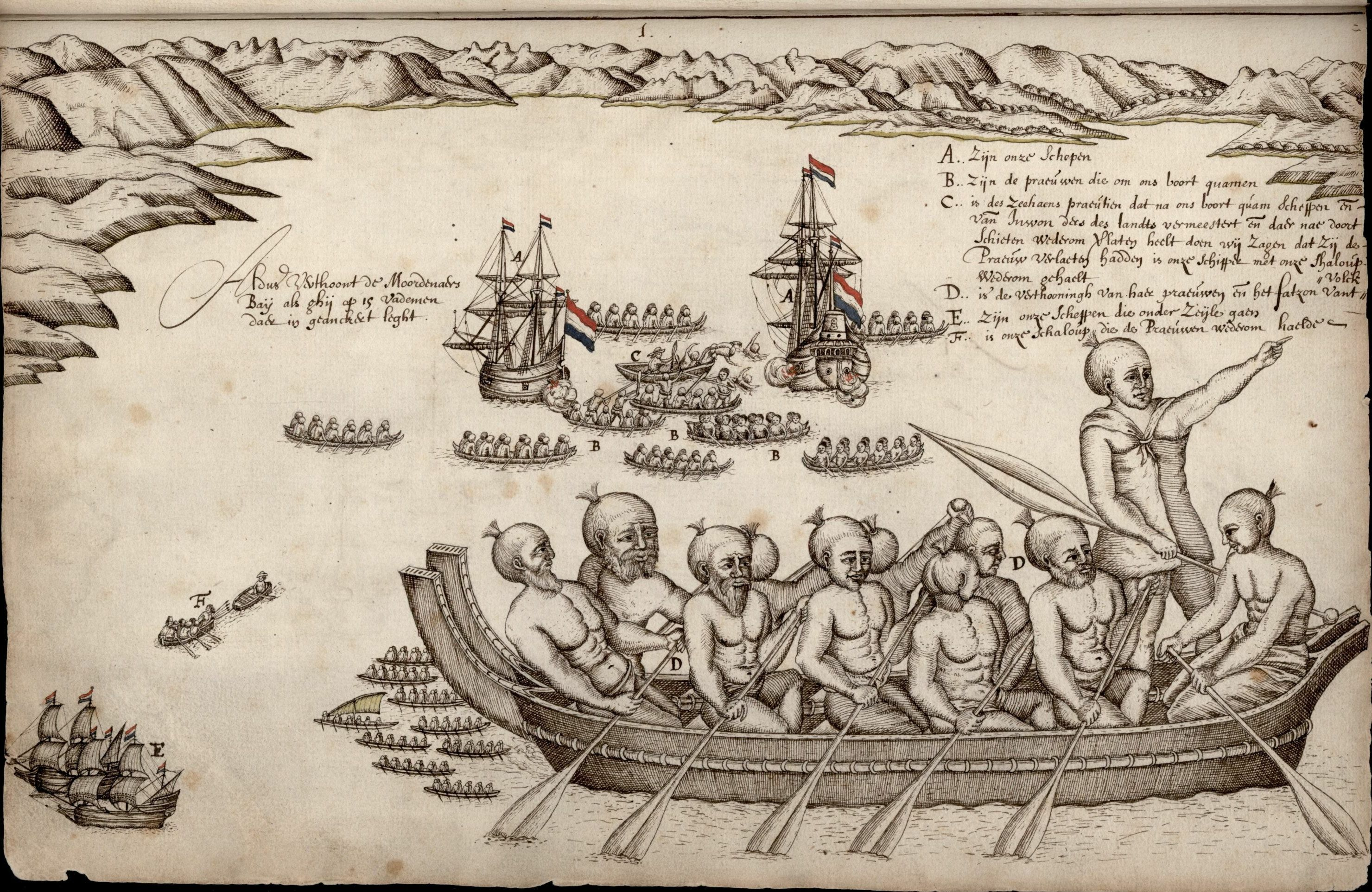
"Murderers' Bay", on the South Island of New Zealand, where several of Tasman's men were killed by Maori in December 1642.

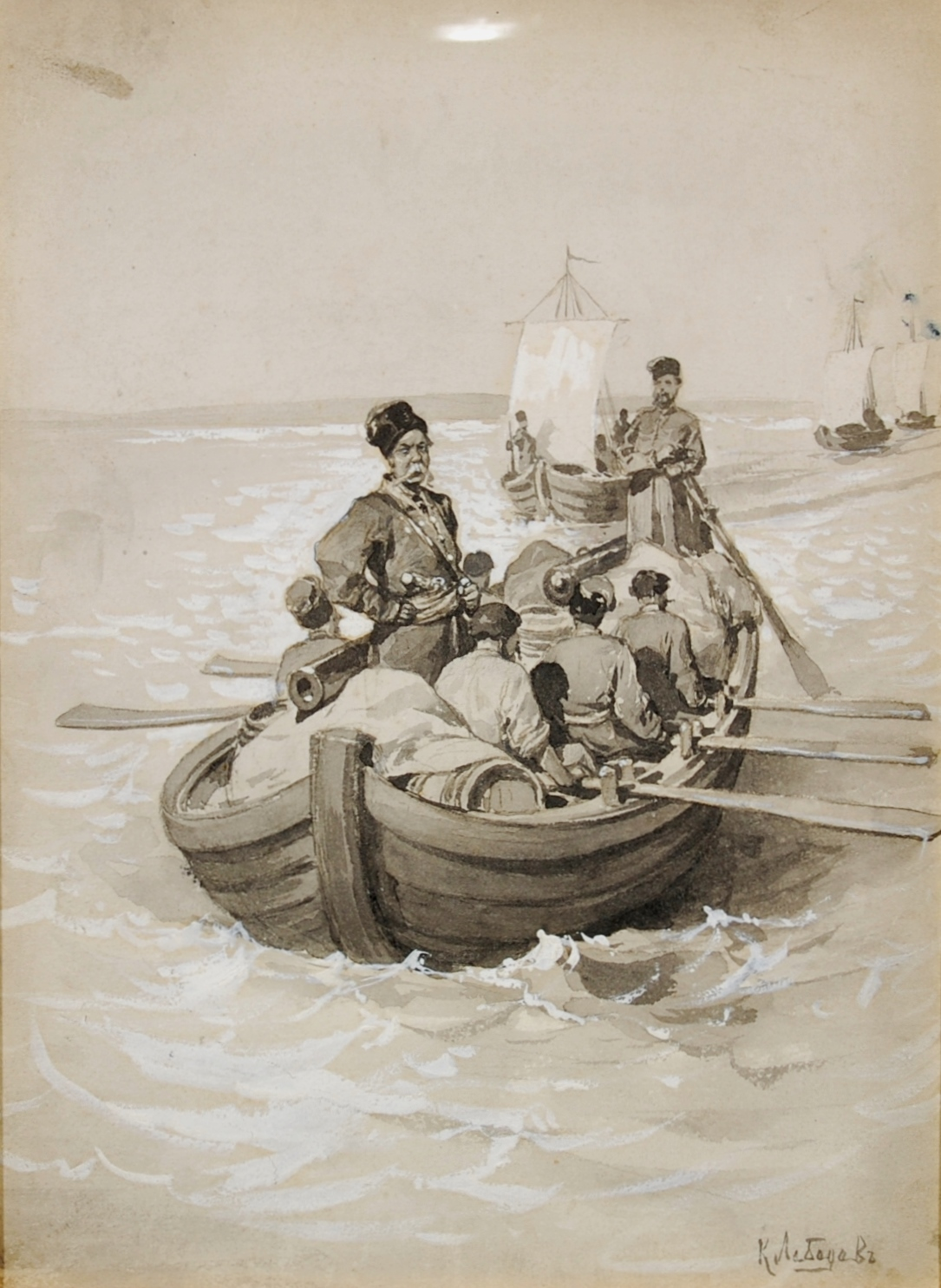
The expedition of Semyon Dezhnyov by Klavdy Lebedev

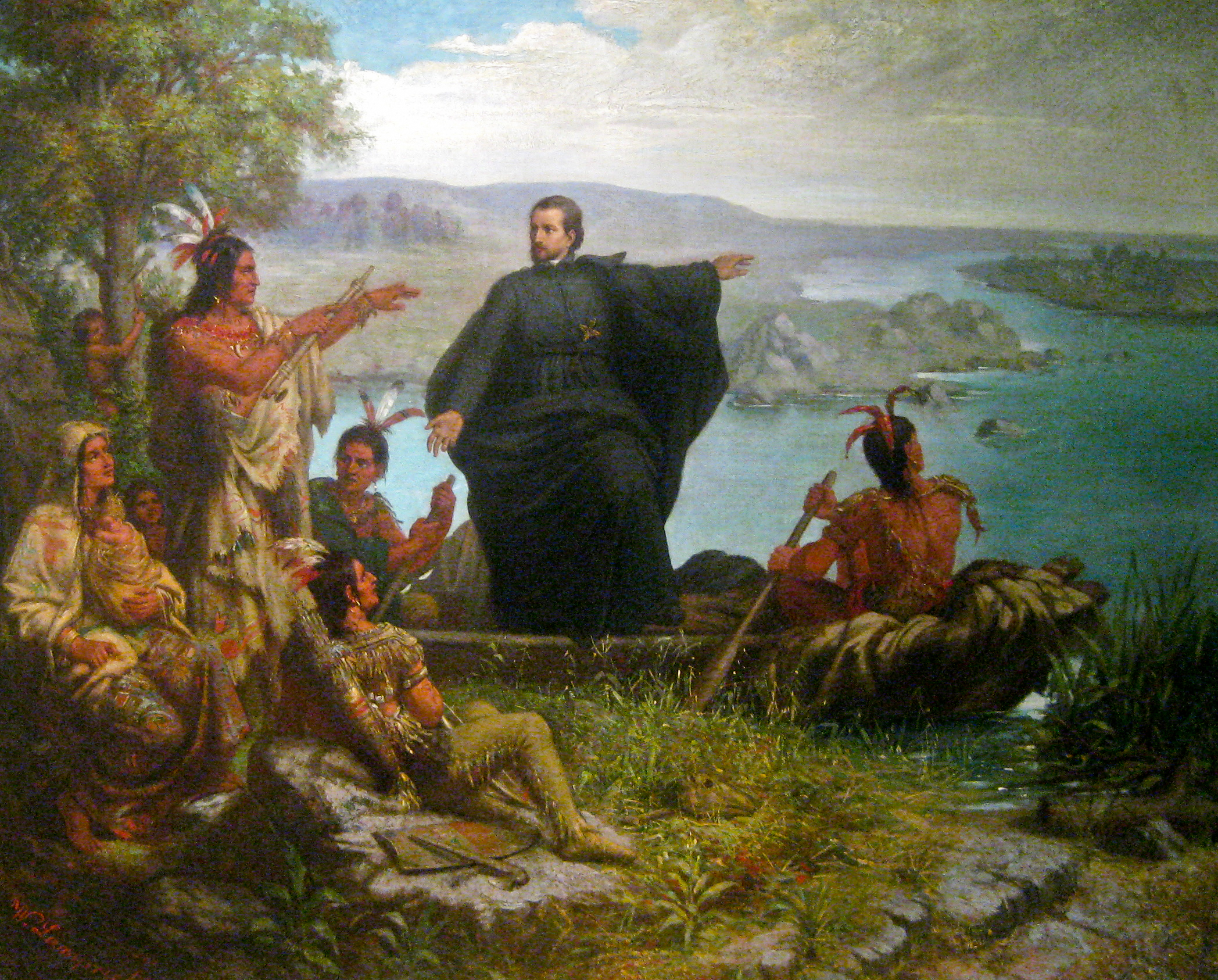
Pere Marquette and the Indians at the Mississippi River, oil painting (1869) by Wilhelm Lamprecht (1838–1906), at Marquette University.

- 1600–01 – Prince Miron Shakhovskoi and D. Khripunov descend the Ob to the Ob Estuary and ascend the Taz River, establishing the ostrog of Mangazeya about 161 kilometres (100 mi) to 240 kilometres (150 mi) from its mouth.
- 1602–06 – Portuguese missionary Bento de Góis travels overland from India to China, via Afghanistan and the Pamirs.
- 1605 – Ketsk serving men ascend the Ket, portage to the Yenisei, and descend it to its confluence with the Sym.
- 1606 – Dutch navigator Willem Janszoon discovers Australia at the mouth of the Pennefather River on the western coast of the Cape York Peninsula, exploring its coast from Badu Island south to Cape Keerweer (13°58′S).
- 1606 – Pedro Fernandes de Queirós discovers Espiritu Santo, the largest island in what is now the nation of Vanuatu.
- 1606 – Luís Vaz de Torres sails through the strait that now bears his name.
- 1607 – Mangazeyan promyshlenniki and traders reach the lower Yenisei, establish Turukhansk, and ascend the Lower Tunguska, while Ketsk serving men ascend the Yenisei to the Angara, which they also ascend.
- 1607 – Henry Hudson coasts the east coast of Greenland, naming "Hold-with-Hope" (around 73°N).
- 1609 – Hudson sails the Halve Maen up the Hudson River as far north as present-day Albany, New York.
- 1610 – Étienne Brûlé ascends the Ottawa River and reaches Lake Nipissing and Georgian Bay in Lake Huron.
- 1610 – Kondratiy Kurochkin leads an expedition, sailing in kochi, from Turukhansk to the mouth of the Yenisei and east to the mouth of the Pyasina on the Taymyr Peninsula.
- 1610 – A detachment from Mangazeya ascends the Yenisei a further 640 kilometres (400 mi) to its confluence with the Sym.
- 1610–11 – Hudson sails through Hudson Strait into Hudson Bay, where he overwinters in James Bay.
- 1611 – Mangazeyan men reach the Khatanga.
- 1612–13 – Thomas Button is the first to explore the western shores of Hudson Bay, where he winters in the mouth of the Nelson River; also discovers Coats and Southampton Islands.
- 1614 – Whalers discover Jan Mayen.
- 1615–16 – Étienne Brûlé sights the western shore of Lake Ontario, descends the Niagara River, explores what are now parts of modern New York and Pennsylvania, and descends the Susquehanna River to Chesapeake Bay.
- 1616 – Jacob Le Maire and Willem Schouten discover and name Le Maire Strait, Staten Island, and Cape Horn; also discover Tonga (Niuafo'ou, Niuatoputapu, and Tafahi), Futuna and Alofi (in modern Wallis and Futuna), and several islands in the Tuamotu (Takaroa, Takapoto, Manihi, Ahe and Rangiroa) and Bismarck Archipelagos (including New Hanover and New Ireland).
- 1616 – Robert Bylot and William Baffin reach 77°30′ N, enter Baffin Bay, discover Smith, Jones, and Lancaster Sounds and sight the coasts of Ellesmere, Devon, and Bylot Islands.
- 1616 – Dirk Hartog explores some 576 kilometres (358 mi) of coastline (the coast of Western Australia from about 22° to 28° S), discovering Dirk Hartog Island and Shark Bay.
- 1617 – English walrus hunters sight the southern coast of "Sir Thomas Smith's Island" (Nordaustlandet).
- 1618 – Spanish missionary Pedro Páez is believed to be the first European to see and describe the source of the Blue Nile in Ethiopia.
- 1618 – Lenaert Jacobszoon discovers an "island" at 22°S (the coast of Western Australia from Point Cloates to North West Cape).
- 1619 – Frederick de Houtman sights the coast of Western Australia near Fremantle and sails along the coast north for over 640 kilometres (400 mi).
- 1620 – Mangazeyan serving men reach the Vilyuy River and descend it to its confluence with the Lena.
- 1621–23 – Étienne Brûlé and his companion Grenolle travel along the North Channel of Lake Huron (probably sighting Manitoulin Island) to "Grand Lac" (Lake Superior) via St. Mary's River.
- 1622 – The Dutch ship Leeuwin discovers land near present-day Cape Leeuwin.
- 1623 – Jan Carstenszoon discovers the western coast of Cape York Peninsula from Cape Keerweer to the southern mouth of the Gilbert River; while his consort Willem Joosten van Colster discovers "Arnhemsland" and "Speultsland" (modern Arnhem Land and perhaps Groote Eylandt).
- 1624 – António de Andrade becomes the first known European to cross the Himalayas (through the Mana Pass), reaching Tibet.
- 1627 – Jesuit missionaries Estêvão Cacella and João Cabral cross the Himalayas and are the first to enter Bhutan.
- 1627 – François Thijssen, accompanied by Pieter Nuyts, discovers over 1,609 kilometres (1,000 mi) of coastline east of Cape Leeuwin to the eastern end of the Great Australian Bight.
- 1628 – Cabral is the first to enter Nepal.
- 1628 – Gerrit Frederikszoon de Witt captain of the Vianen discovers "Witsland" about 21° S, sailing 320 kilometres (200 mi) along the coast and discovering Barrow Island and parts of the Dampier Archipelago.
- 1628–30 – Vasilii Bugor ascends the Upper Tunguska and portages to the upper Lena, descending it to its confluence with the Kirenga.
- 1631–32 – Luke Foxe and Thomas James, in separate expeditions, both circumnavigate Hudson Bay in search of a Northwest Passage; Foxe sails through the channel and into the basin now named after him to 66°47′N, while James winters in the bay named after him.
- 1632–33 – Pyotr Beketov descends the Lena as far as its great bend, erects the ostrog Yakutsk, and sends a detachment some 720 kilometres (450 mi) downriver (where the zimovie Zhigansk is built) and another east up the Aldan as far as the Amga (which they also ascend in search of yasak).
- 1633–34 – French trader Jean Nicolet discovers Lake Michigan and likely reaches Green Bay, Wisconsin.
- 1633–38 – Ilya Perfilyev and Ivan Rebrov sail from Zhigansk in kochi some 800 kilometres (500 mi) downriver to the mouth of the Lena and sail along the coast east and west, reaching the mouths of the Olenyok, Yana, and Indigirka rivers.
- 1638–40 – Poznik Ivanov crosses the Verkhoyansk Range into the upper reaches of the Yana, and then portages over the Chersky Range into the Indigirka River system.
- 1639–40 – Maksim Perfilyev ascends the Vitim River to the Tsipa, which he also ascends (until rapids force him to turn back), becoming the first Russian to enter Transbaikal.
- 1639–41 – Ivan Moskvitin ascends the Maya, portages across the Dzhugdzhur Mountains, and descends the Ulya to the Sea of Okhotsk; two groups are sent to the north and south, reaching the mouths of the Taui and Uda rivers, respectively.
- 1641 – Dmitri Zyrian discovers the Alazeya, which he ascends as far as the tree line.
- 1642–43 – Dutch explorer Abel Tasman discovers "Anthony van Diemenslandt" (Tasmania) and "Staten Landt" (New Zealand). The following year he discovers "'t Eylandt Amsterdam" (Tongatapu), Fiji and New Britain.
- 1643 – Kurbat Ivanov reaches the western shores of Lake Baikal, opposite Olkhon.
- 1643 – Maarten Gerritsz Vries sails along the eastern coast of "Yezo" (Hokkaidō), between Iturup and Urup, to Sakhalin.
- 1643 – Vasiliy Sychev discovers the Anabar, where he establishes the zimovie Anabarskoye.
- 1643–45 – Vassili Poyarkov crosses the Stanovoy Range and descends the Zeya to the Amur, which he follows to its mouth; from here, he coasts along the Sea of Okhotsk to the Ulya (on the way sighting the Shantar Islands).
- 1644 – Tasman maps the northern coast of Australia, connecting "Nova Guinea" (the Cape York Peninsula) with "the land of D'Eendracht" (Western Australia).
- 1644 – Mikhail Stadukhin reaches the Kolyma.
- 1644–47 – Ivan Pokhabov is the first to ascend the Angara to Lake Baikal, which he crosses to the Selenga; he later ascends it and reaches Urga (in present-day Mongolia).
- 1646 – Isaya Ignatyev reaches Chaunskaya Bay.
- 1648–49 – Semyon Dezhnyov sails from the Kolyma, rounds Cape Dezhnev (thus proving Asia and America are separate), and reaches the Anadyr River, which he ascends for some 563 kilometres (350 mi) (here he builds the zimovie Anadyrsk).
- 1649–51 – Yerofey Khabarov ascends the Olyokma River, crosses the northern Yablonoi Mountains, and descends the Amur to its confluence with the Songhua.
- 1650 – Stadukhin and Semen Motora travel from the Kolyma, across the Anyuyskiy Range, to Anadyrsk.
- 1651–57 – Stadukhin travels from Anadyrsk to the mouth of the Penzhina River, then west along the northern coast of the Sea of Okhotsk to Okhotsk.
- 1653–54 – Beketov ascends the Khilok, crosses the southern Yablonoi Mountains, and descends the Ingoda and Shilka rivers to the latter's confluence with the Nercha (where his men build the ostrog Nerchinsk).
- 1654 – Médard Chouart des Groseilliers explores the entire western shore of Lake Michigan.
- 1659 – Groseilliers and Pierre-Esprit Radisson explore the southern shore of Lake Superior as far west as Chequamegon Bay.
- 1661 – Jesuit missionaries Johann Grueber and Albert Dorville are the first to visit Lhasa.
- 1669 – René-Robert Cavelier, Sieur de La Salle discovers the Ohio River, descending it as far as the Falls of the Ohio near the site of modern Louisville, Kentucky.
- 1673 – French-Canadian explorer Louis Jolliet and Jesuit missionary Jacques Marquette reach the upper Mississippi River, descending it to its confluence with the Arkansas River and becoming the first Europeans to map the surrounding river valley. They also discover the Missouri River.
- 1675 – During a commercial voyage, English merchant Anthony de la Roché accidentally discovers South Georgia Island, the first ever discovery of land south of the Antarctic Convergence.
- 1682 – Robert de La Salle descends the "Rivière de Colbert" (Mississippi) to its mouth.
- 1688–89 – Jacques de Noyon discovers Rainy Lake and Lake of the Woods.
- 1690–92 – Henry Kelsey travels from York Factory southwestward, probably reaching the Saskatchewan and the headwaters of the Assiniboine, in the process becoming the first European to see the Canadian Prairies.
- 1696 – Luka Morozko travels almost halfway down the west coast of Kamchatka, reaching the Tigil River.
- 1697–99 – Vladimir Atlasov reaches as far as the Golygina River on the southwest coast of Kamchatka, from which he sights Atlasov Island; also crosses the Sredinny Range (twice), reaching Olyutor Gulf and the Kamchatka River.

== 18th century ==
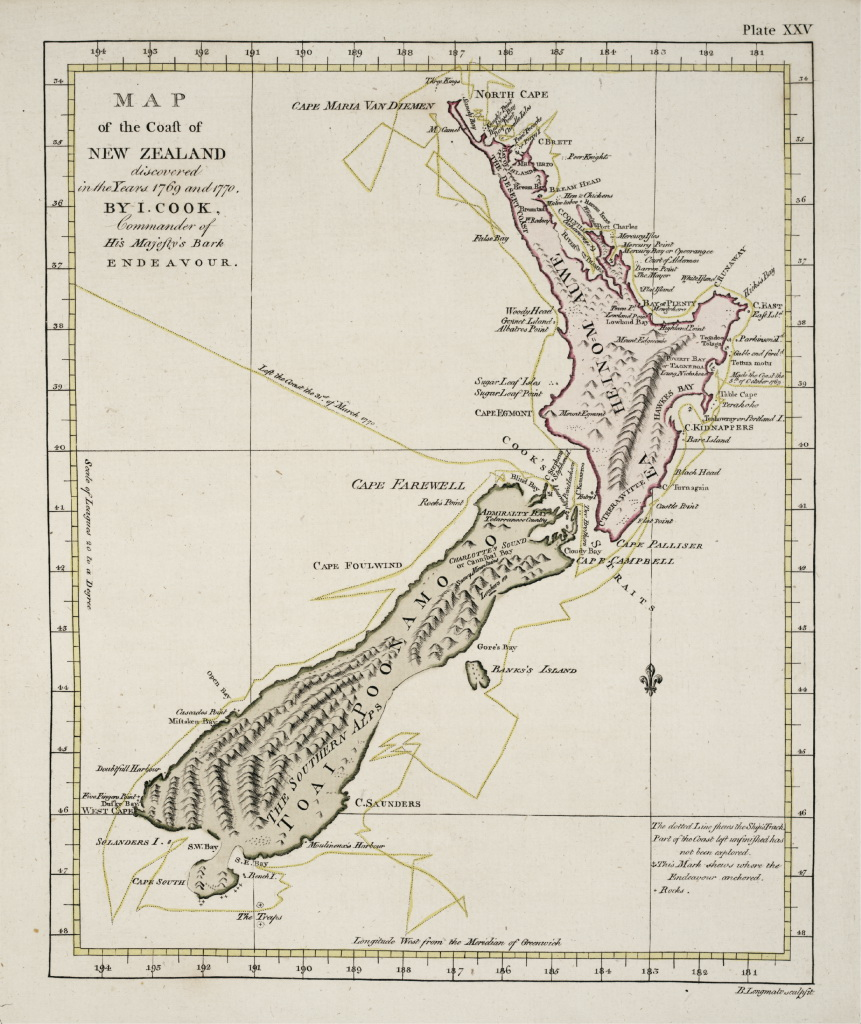
James Cook's map of New Zealand

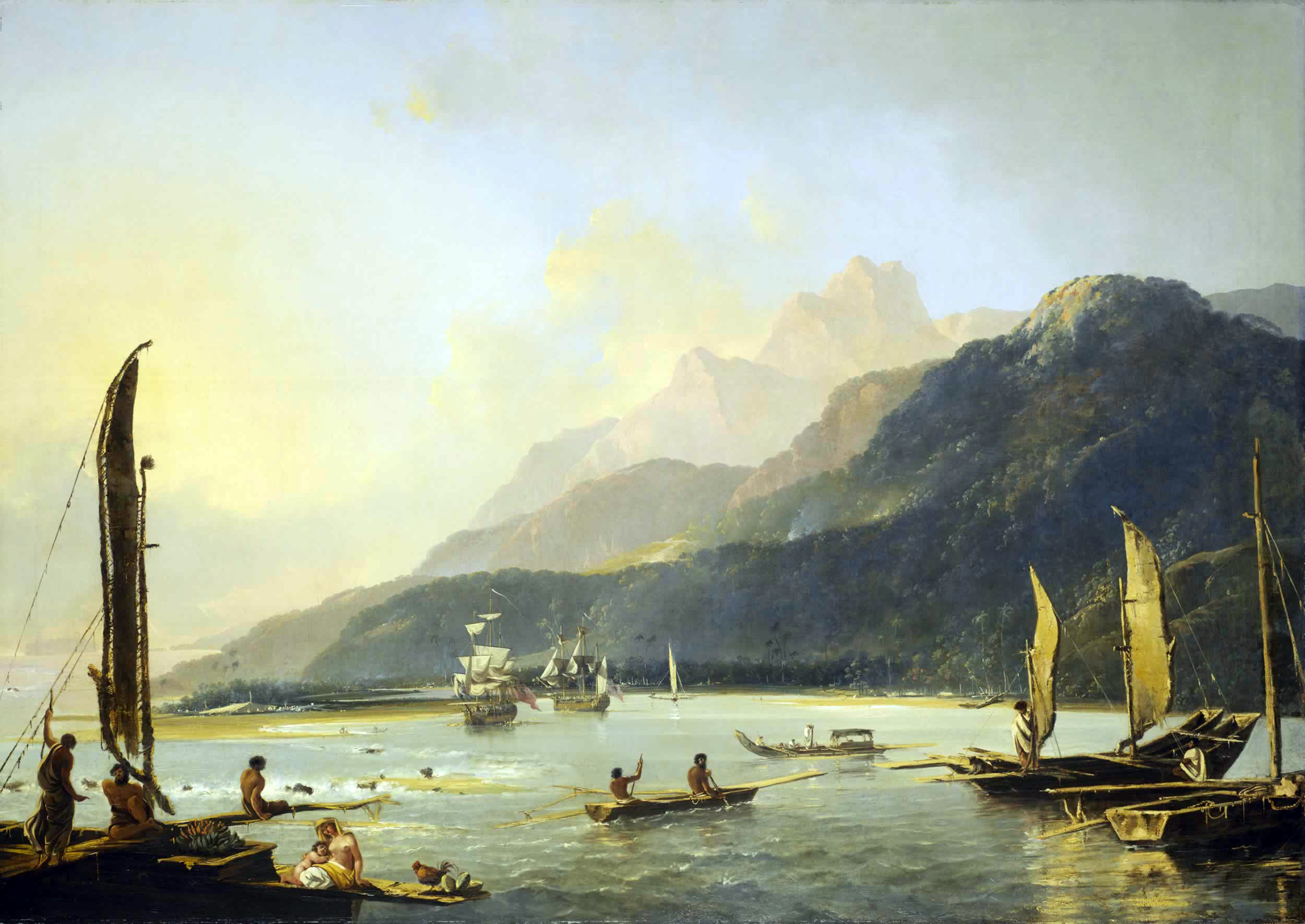
Resolution and Adventure in Matavai Bay by William Hodges

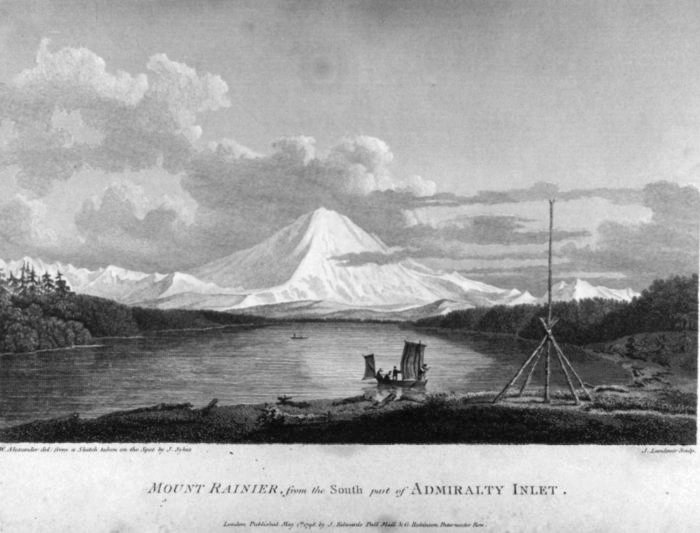
"Mount Rainier from the south Part of Admiralty Inlet". The mountain was discovered by Vancouver during his exploration of Puget Sound in the spring of 1792.

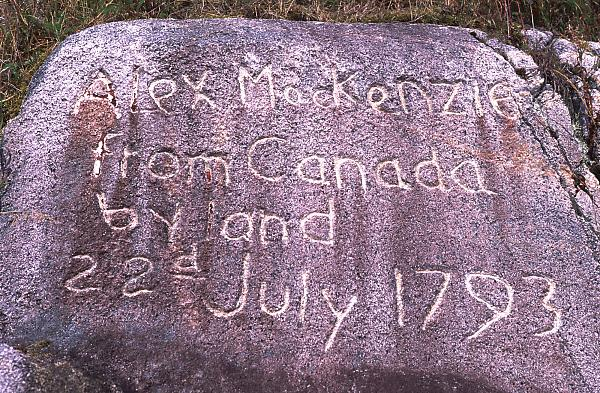
Inscription at the end of the Alexander Mackenzie's Canada crossing located at 52°22′43″N 127°28′14″W

- 1702 – The Spanish ship Rosario discovers Rosario Island, later renamed Nishinoshima in 1904, around 940 km (584 mi) south-southeast of Tokyo.
- 1706 – Mikhail Nasedkin reaches Cape Lopatka and sights Shumshu, northernmost of the Kuril Islands.
- 1710 – Yakov Permyakov discovers Bolshoy Lyakhovsky Island.
- 1713 – Ivan Kozyrevsky reaches Shumshu and Paramushir.
- 1714 – Étienne de Veniard, Sieur de Bourgmont ascends the Missouri River as far as its confluence with the Platte River, becoming the first European to enter present-day Nebraska.
- 1720 – Pedro de Villasur travels from Santa Fe, through what is now part of southeastern Colorado, to the lower Platte in eastern Nebraska.
- 1722 – Dutch explorer Jacob Roggeveen discovers "Paasch Eiland" (Easter Island) and Tutuila and Upolu.
- 1728 – In the service of the Russian Empire, Danish-born Russian explorer Vitus Bering sails through the strait that now bears his name. He also discovers and names Saint Lawrence Island.
- 1732 – Mikhail Gvozdev discovers the "Large Country" (Alaska).
- 1734 – Jean Baptiste de La Vérendrye discovers Lake Winnipeg.
- 1734–37 – Stepan Muravev and Mikhail Pavlov chart the Russian coast from Arkhangelsk to just east of the Pechora, while Stepan Malygin charts it from there to the Ob River, including the Yamal Peninsula.
- 1735–36 – Vasili Pronchishchev charts the Russian coast from the Lena west to the Khatanga.
- 1737 – Dmitry Ovtsyn charts the Russian coast from the mouth of the Ob to the Yenisei.
- 1738 – Pierre de La Vérendrye visits Mandan villages near the site of present-day Bismarck, North Dakota.
- 1738–40 – Fyodor Minin charts the Russian coast from the Yenisei to the Pyasina.
- 1739 – Jean Bouvet de Lozier discovers "Cape Circumcision" (Bouvet Island).
- 1739–41 – Dmitry Laptev charts the Russian coast from the Lena to just east of the Kolyma.
- 1741 – Bering sights Mount St. Elias, the entrance of Prince William Sound, the Alaska Peninsula (from Cape Providence to Chignik Bay) and several of the Aleutian Islands (discovering Great Sitkin, Atka, and Kiska), as well as discovering Kayak, Montague, Hinchinbrook, Sitkalidak, and the Shumagin and Commander Islands; his second-in-command, Aleksei Chirikov, sights Mounts Fairweather and Douglas and discovers Noyes and Baker Islands (both off the west coast of Prince of Wales Island), as well as Baranof, Chichagof, Kruzof, Yakobi, Kodiak, Afognak, the Aleutian Islands (Umnak, Adak, Agattu, Attu, and the Islands of Four Mountains), and the Kenai Peninsula.
- 1741–42 – Khariton Laptev and Semion Chelyuskin chart the Taymyr Peninsula, with the latter reaching Cape Chelyuskin, the northernmost point of Asia.
- 1742 – Christopher Middleton discovers Wager Bay and Repulse Bay.
- 1742–43 – Louis-Joseph Gaultier de La Vérendrye and his brother François reach the Big Horn Mountains of modern Wyoming; on their return they reach the vicinity of present-day Pierre, South Dakota.
- 1747 – Jeremiah Westall discovers Chesterfield Inlet and sails about sixty miles up it.
- 1761–62 – William Christopher sails 370 kilometres (230 mi) into Chesterfield Inlet to the western end of Baker Lake.
- 1767 – Samuel Wallis discovers "King George's Land" (Tahiti).
- 1769 – José Ortega discovers San Francisco Bay.
- 1769–70 – During his first voyage, English explorer James Cook circumnavigates both islands of New Zealand, proving they are not part of Terra Australis Incognita. He also charts the east coast of Australia from Cape Howe to Cape York.
- 1771–72 – Samuel Hearne reaches the Coppermine, descending it to what would become known as Coronation Gulf; the following year, on his way back, he becomes the first to sight and cross Great Slave Lake.
- 1772 – Yves-Joseph de Kerguelen-Trémarec discovers the Kerguelen Islands.
- 1772 – Pedro Fages sights the Sierra Nevada.
- 1773 – Ivan Lyakhov reaches Kotelny Island.
- 1773–75 – During his second voyage, James Cook crosses the Antarctic Circle, reaching 71° 10’ S, and disproving the existence of Terra Australis Incognita. He also discovers New Caledonia and the South Sandwich Islands.
- 1774 – Juan José Pérez Hernández explores the western coast of North America from Cape Mendocino northwards, discovering the Queen Charlotte Islands, Vancouver Island, and Dall Island.
- 1775 – Bruno de Heceta discovers the mouth of the Columbia River; his consort Juan Francisco de la Bodega y Quadra discovers Prince of Wales Island (Bucareli Bay).
- 1776 – Attempting to travel overland to Las Californias, Franciscan priests Atanasio Domínguez and Silvestre Vélez de Escalante follow the Rio Grande north to the modern state of Colorado and then travel west, discovering Utah Lake and exploring much of the Four Corners region before returning to Santa Fe.
- 1777–78 – During his third voyage James Cook discovers Christmas Island and the Hawaiian Islands, and also explores the Alaskan coast as far north as Icy Cape, discovering Cook Inlet and Prince William Sound.
- 1787 – Charles William Barkley discovers the Strait of Juan de Fuca.
- 1788 – Captain Arthur Phillip arrives with The First Fleet in Botany Bay on the coast of Sydney, Australia.
- 1789 – Alexander Mackenzie descends the Mackenzie River to its mouth in the Arctic Ocean.
- 1791 – Francisco de Eliza discovers the "Canal de Nuestra Señora del Rosario" (Strait of Georgia); José María Narváez explores up it, passing the mouth of the Fraser River and reaching as far north as Texada Island.
- 1791–95 – George Vancouver, together with William Broughton, Peter Puget, Joseph Whidbey, and James Johnstone, charts the modern states of Oregon and Washington, the coast of British Columbia, and the Alaska Panhandle, discovering Admiralty, Mitkof and Wrangell Islands in the Alexander Archipelago, as well as proving the insularity of Kuiu and Revillagigedo Islands. The expedition also charts Admiralty Inlet and Puget Sound and discovers the Chatham Islands and The Snares.
- 1792 – Spanish naval officers Dionisio Alcalá Galiano and Cayetano Valdés y Flores circumnavigate Vancouver Island, proving its insularity.
- 1792 – Jacinto Caamaño enters Clarence Strait, showing that much of the Alaska Panhandle is an archipelago and not part of the mainland, as had been presumed. He also sights the southwest coast of Revillagigedo Island.
- 1792–93 – Mackenzie ascends the Peace and Parsnip, crosses the Canadian Rockies to the headwaters of the Fraser, ascends the West Road River and crosses the Coast Mountains, reaching the Bella Coola, which he descends to North Bentinck Arm and Dean Channel.
- 1796 – Scottish explorer Mungo Park reaches the upper Niger, exploring it from Ségou to Silla.
- 1797–98 – George Bass explores from Cape Howe to Western Port, discovering the Bass Strait.
- 1798 – John Fearn discovers "Pleasant Island" (Nauru).
- 1798 – Francisco de Lacerda travels from Tete northwest to Lake Mweru.
- 1798–99 – English cartographer Matthew Flinders and George Bass circumnavigate Tasmania, proving its insularity.

== 19th century ==
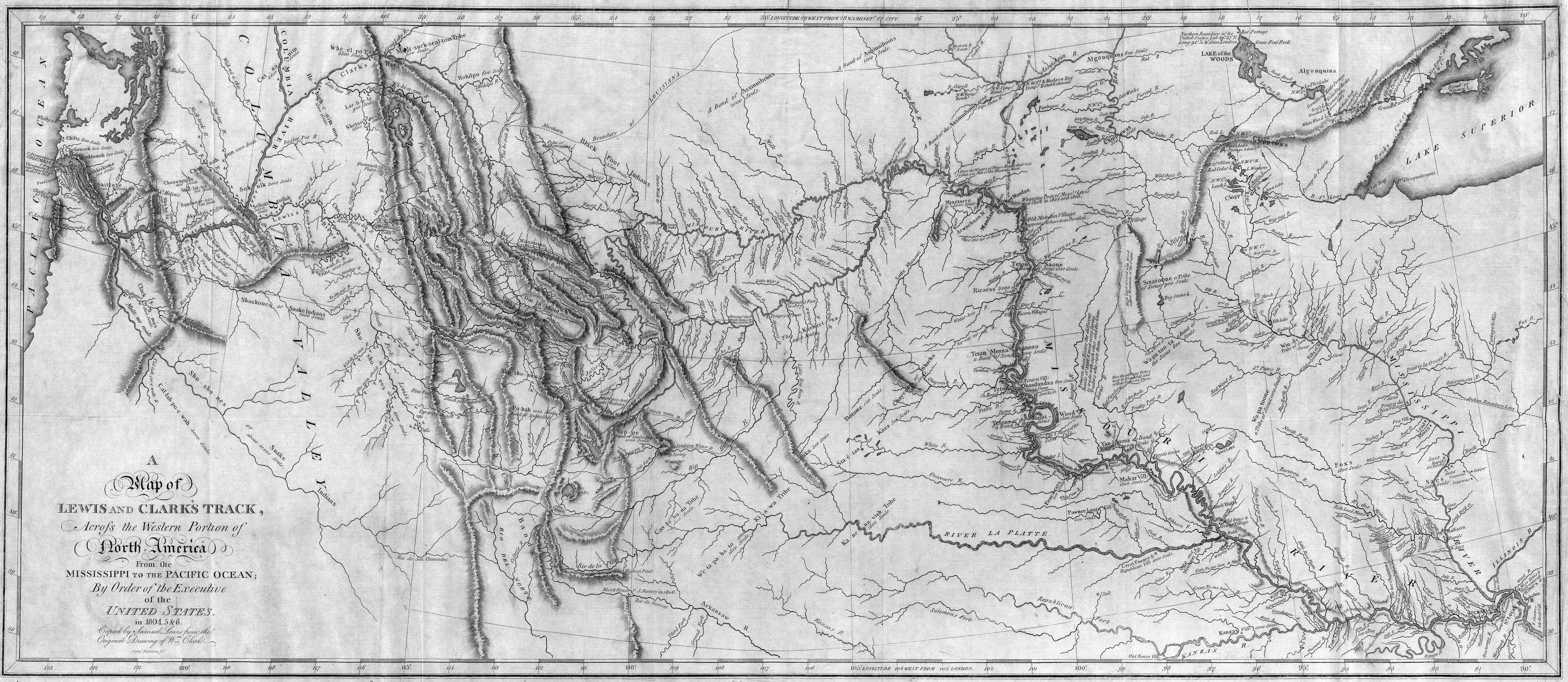
The famous map of Lewis and Clark's expedition. It changed mapping of northwest America by providing the first accurate depiction of the relationship of the sources of the Columbia and Missouri rivers, and the Rocky Mountains.

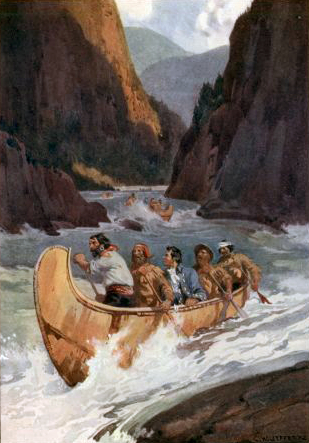
Colour drawing of Simon Fraser's 1808 descent of the Fraser River.

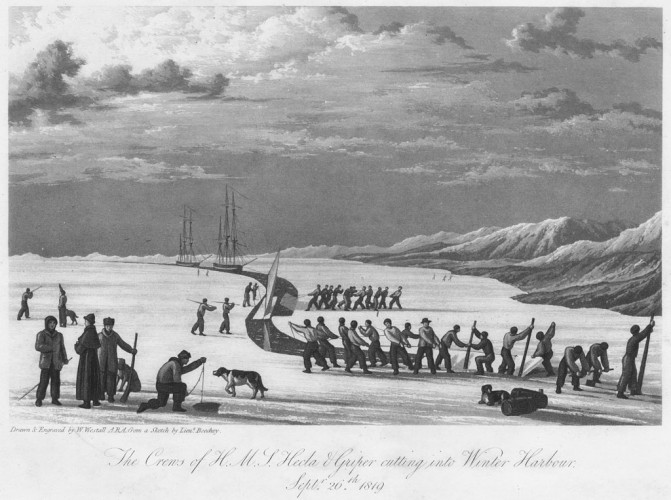
"The Crews of H.M.S. Hecla & Griper Cutting into Winter Harbour, 26 September 1819". An engraving from the journal published in 1821.

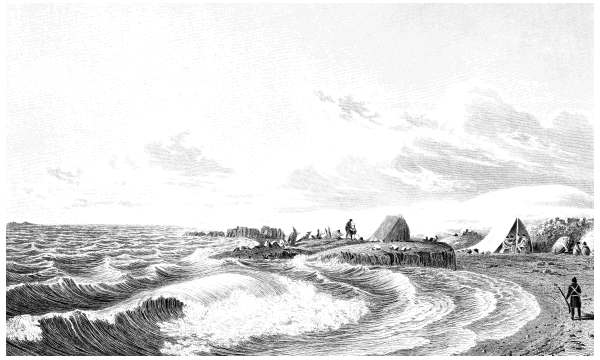
John Franklin's party encamped at Point Turnagain, the furthest point he reached.

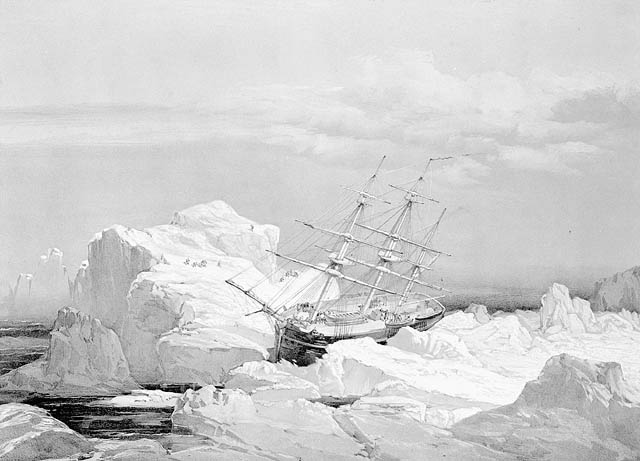
HMS Investigator, on the northwestern coast of Banks Island, 20 August 1851.

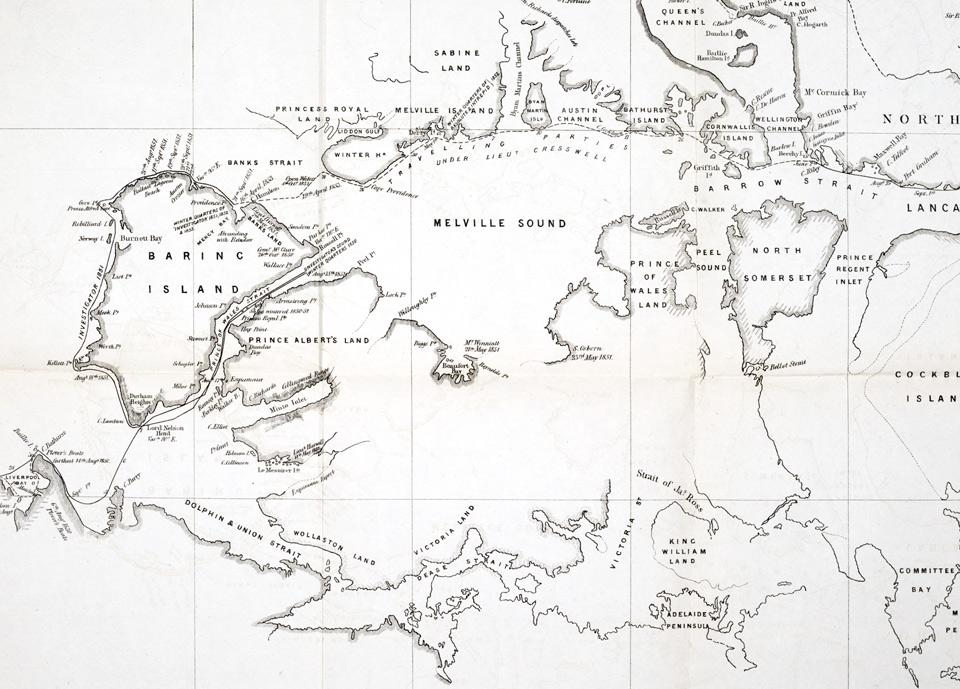
Map drawn by Robert McClure detailing the Northwest Passage, including the 1851 route of the Investigator.

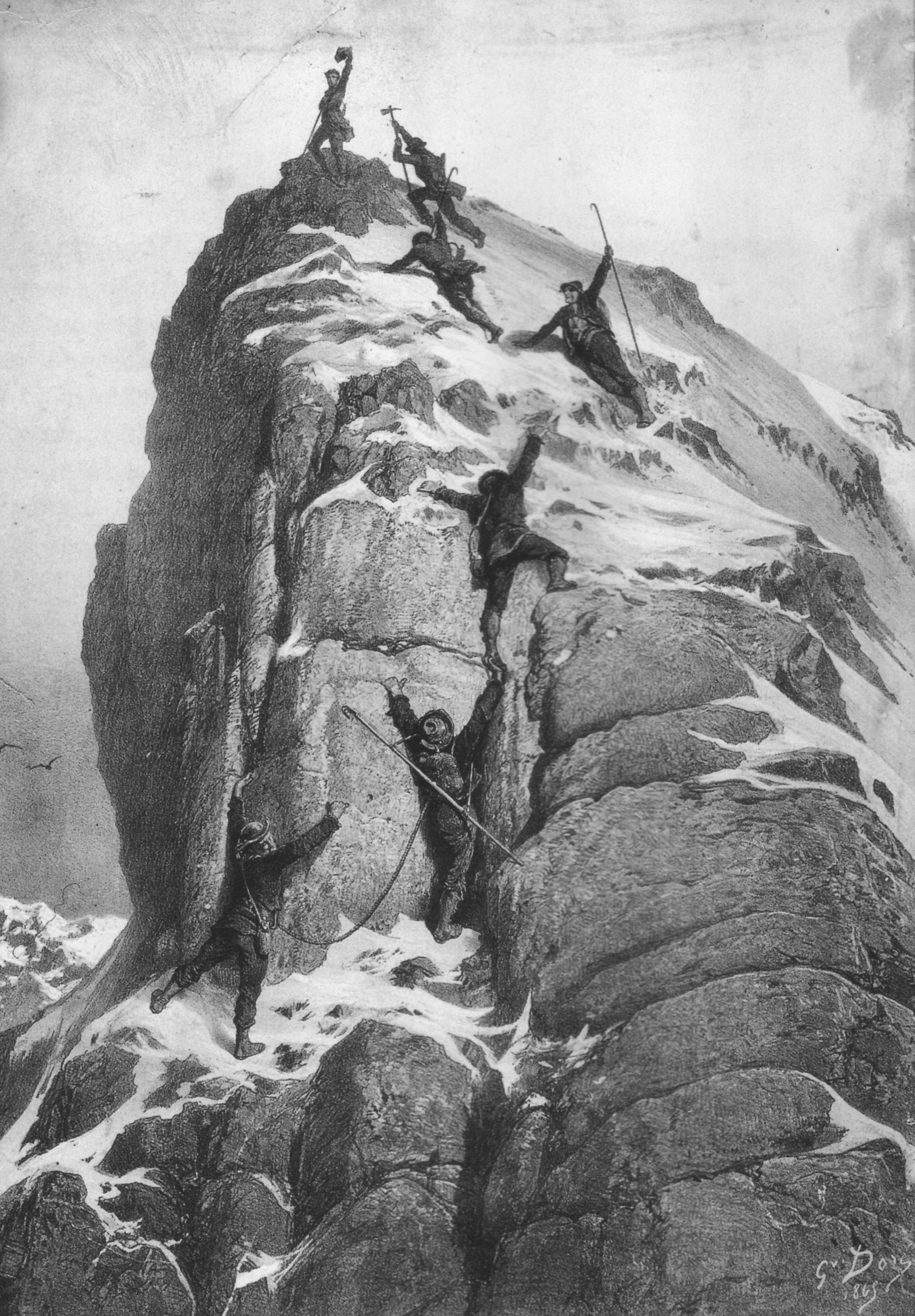
The first ascent of the Matterhorn, by Gustave Doré.

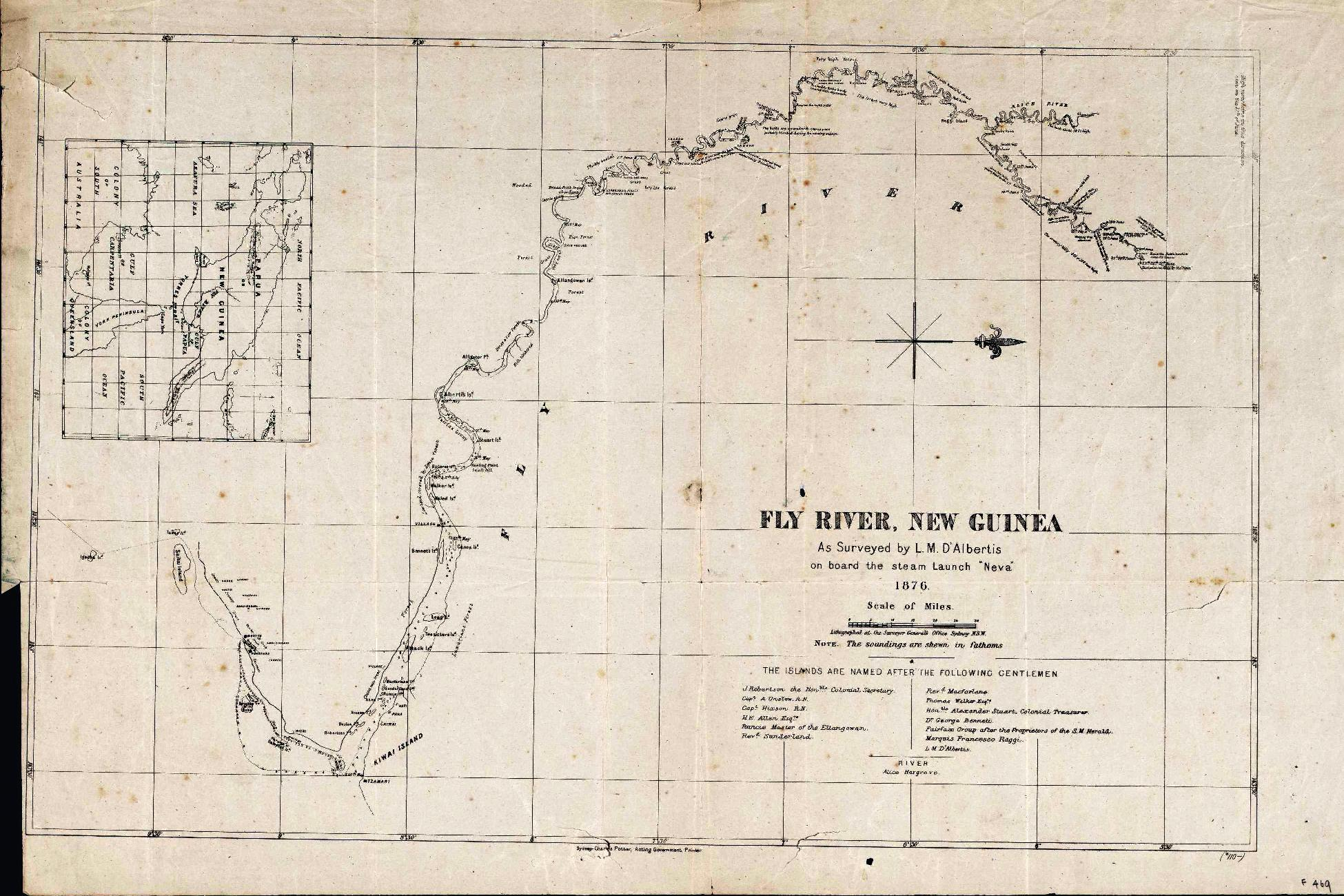
The original survey map created by L.M. D'Albertis in 1876.

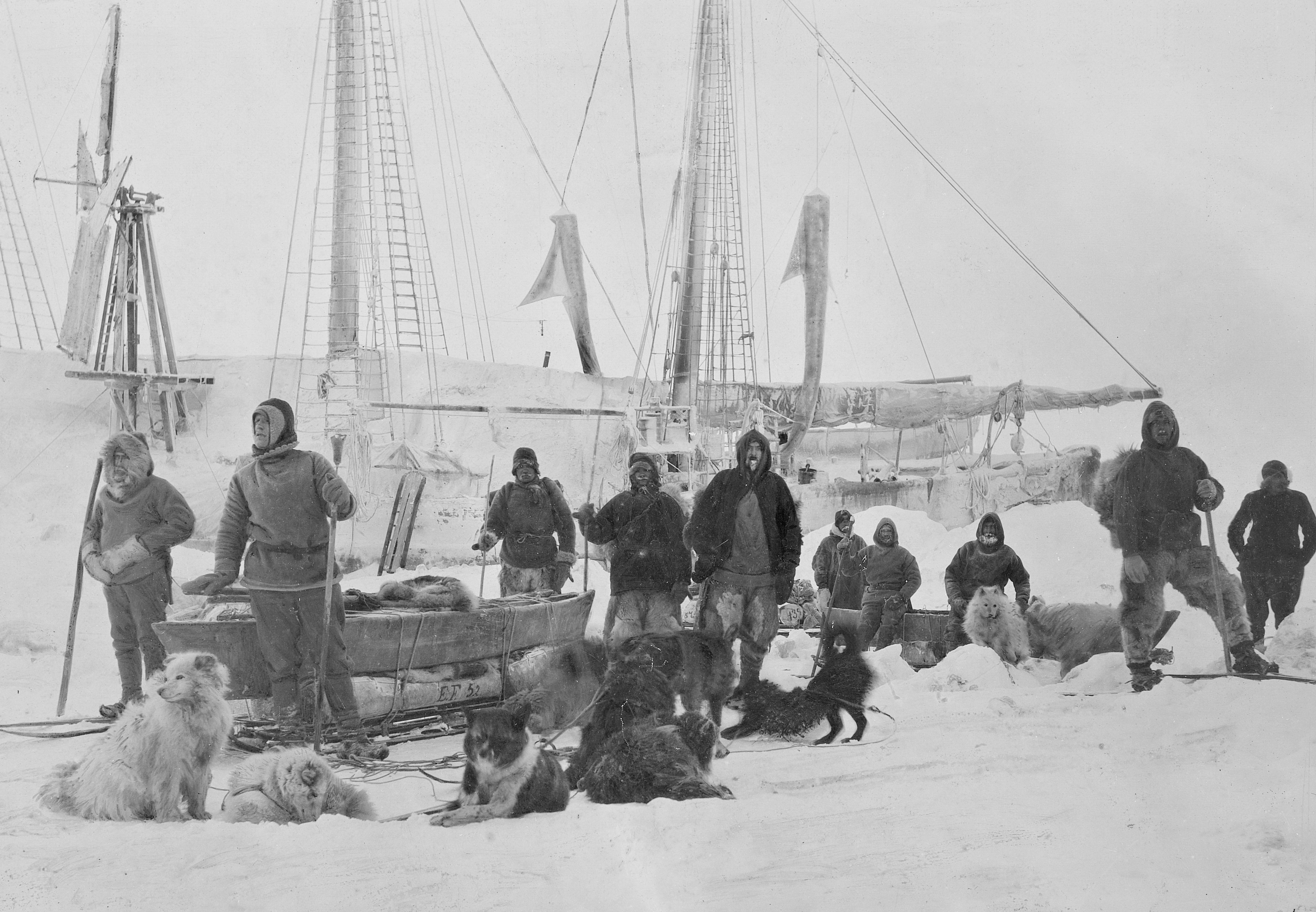
Nansen and Johansen finally depart on their polar journey, 14 March 1895. Nansen is the tall figure, second from left; Johansen is standing second from right.

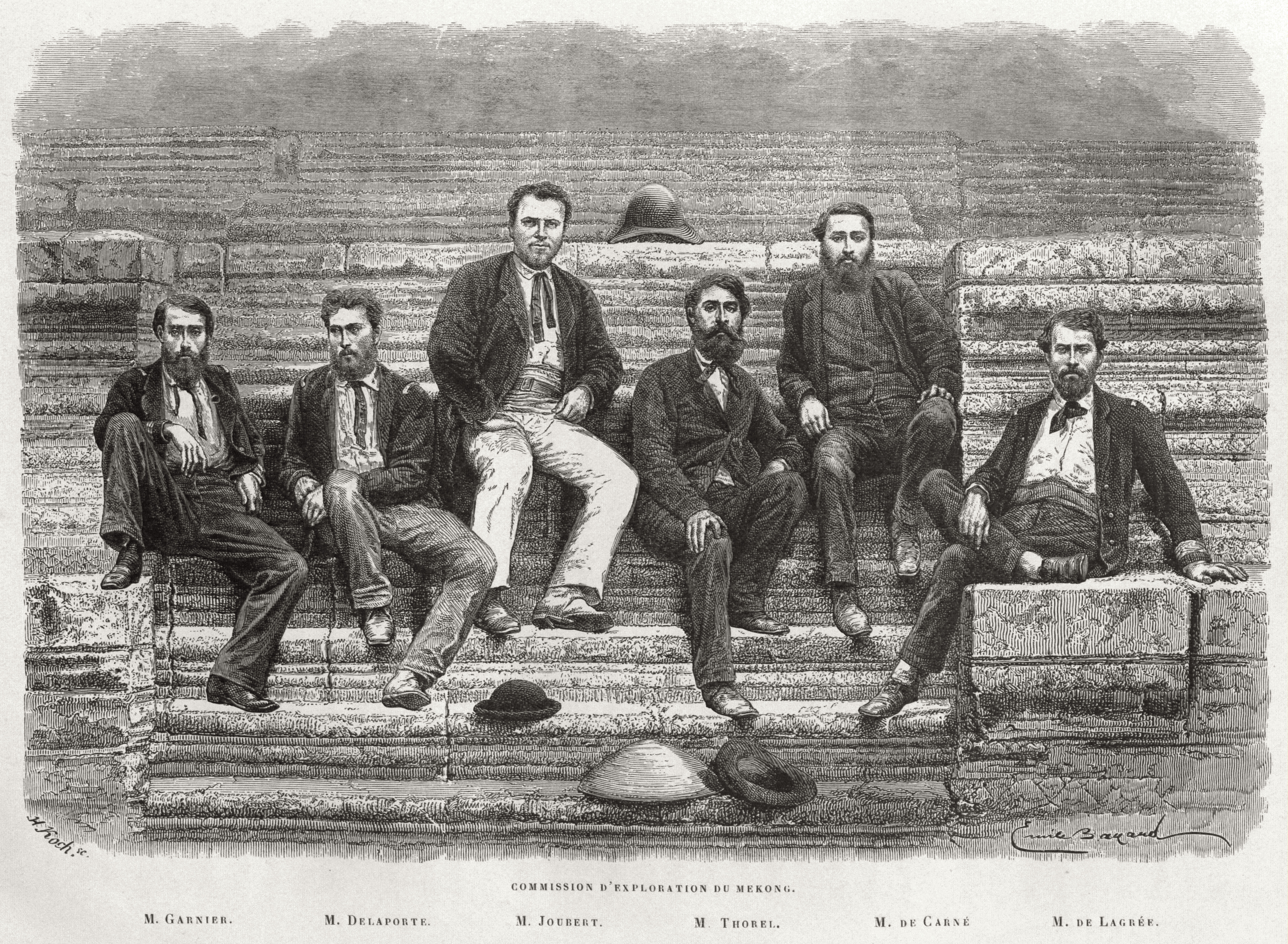
The Mekong Exploration Commission at Angkor in 1866 From left to right: Francis Garnier, Louis Delaporte, Clovis Thorel, Captain Ernest Doudart de Lagrée, Lucien Joubert, Louis de Carné engraving from photo by Émile Gsell

- 1800 – James Grant discovers the Australian coastline from Cape Banks to Cape Otway.
- c. 1801–04 – A fur trading post is built on Great Bear Lake.
- 1802 – John Murray discovers Port Phillip Bay.
- 1802 – Matthew Flinders explores the coast from Fowlers Bay to Encounter Bay, discovering Spencer Gulf, Kangaroo Island, and Gulf St. Vincent.
- 1802 – Nicolas Baudin explores the coast from Cape Banks to Encounter Bay, where he meets Flinders.
- 1802–03 – Flinders circumnavigates Australia.
- 1805–06 – Meriwether Lewis and William Clark, from Fort Mandan, ascend the Missouri to its headwaters, cross the Continental Divide via Lemhi Pass in the Bitterroot Range to enter the present state of Idaho, and descend the Clearwater and Snake rivers to the Columbia, which they descend to its mouth; on the way back Lewis explores the Blackfoot and Sun rivers, as well as the headwaters of the Marias, while Clark travels through Bozeman Pass and descends the Yellowstone to its confluence with the Missouri.
- 1805–06 – Mungo Park descends the Niger as far as the Bussa rapids, where he is drowned.
- 1806 – Yakov Sannikov discovers New Siberia Island.
- 1806 – Abraham Bristow discovers the Auckland Islands.
- 1808 – Simon Fraser descends the Fraser River for some 800 kilometres (500 mi) to its mouth, reaching the Strait of Georgia.
- 1810 – Frederick Hasselborough discovers Campbell and Macquarie Islands.
- 1811–12 – Wilson Price Hunt discovers Union Pass in the Wind River Range and reaches the upper Snake River, while Robert Stuart discovers South Pass—his route would later become the Oregon Trail.
- 1816 – Otto von Kotzebue discovers Kotzebue Sound.
- 1819 – William Smith discovers the South Shetland Islands.
- 1819–20 – William Edward Parry enters Lancaster Sound and reaches Melville Island, discovering and naming Cornwallis, Bathurst, and Somerset Islands; the following year sights "Banks Land" (Banks Island).
- 1820 – Edward Bransfield sights the Antarctic Peninsula; also discovers northernmost islands of the South Shetlands.
- 1820–21 – Fabian Gottlieb von Bellingshausen discovers the northernmost islands of the South Sandwich group; following year discovers Peter I and Alexander Islands.
- 1821 – English naval officer John Franklin explores over 800 kilometres (500 mi) of coastline from the mouth of the Coppermine River to Point Turnagain on the Kent Peninsula.
- 1821 – Sealers Nathaniel Palmer and George Powell discover "Powell's Islands" (South Orkney Islands).
- 1821–23 – Parry explores the eastern side of the Melville Peninsula, reaching the western entrance of Fury and Hecla Strait; also explores the northern coast of Foxe Basin.
- 1823 – Dixon Denham, Walter Oudney, and Hugh Clapperton are the first Europeans to sight Lake Chad.
- 1823 – Sealer James Weddell sails to 74°15′S into "King George IV's Sea" (Weddell Sea).
- 1824 – Samuel Black ascends the Finlay to Thutade Lake, source of the Finlay-Peace-Slave-Mackenzie river system, then portages to the Stikine and Turnagain.
- 1824–25 – Étienne Provost, Jim Bridger, and Peter Skene Ogden independently reach the Great Salt Lake.
- 1825–26 – Franklin explores the Arctic coastline from the mouth of the Mackenzie River west to Point Beechey, while his partner John Richardson explores east to the Coppermine River, naming Dolphin and Union Strait and discovering "Wollaston Land" (part of the southern coast of Victoria Island) — combining to chart over 1,930 kilometres (1,200 mi) of coastline; Richardson also surveys the five arms of Great Bear Lake.
- 1826 – Frederick William Beechey charts the Alaskan coastline from Icy Cape to Point Barrow; also discovers Vanavana, Fangataufa, and Ahunui in the Tuamotu archipelago.
- 1826 – Scottish explorer Alexander Gordon Laing becomes the first European to reach the fabled city of Timbuktu, but is murdered upon leaving the city.
- 1827 – Jedediah Smith crosses the Sierra Nevada (via Ebbetts Pass) and the Great Basin.
- 1828 – French explorer René Caillié is the first European to return alive from Timbuktu.
- 1829–30 – John Ross discovers "Boothia Felix" (the Boothia Peninsula); the following year his nephew James Clark Ross crosses its narrow isthmus and reaches King William Island.
- 1830 – English explorer Richard Lander and his brother John descend the Niger for more than 643 kilometres (400 mi) from Bussa to its mouth.
- 1831–32 – John Biscoe discovers Enderby Land; following year discovers Adelaide, Anvers, and Biscoe Islands.
- 1833 – Andrei Glazunov and Semyon Lukin discover the mouth of the Yukon River.
- 1833–35 – Pyotr Pakhtusov and Avgust Tsivolko chart the entire east coast of Yuzhny Island, as well as the east coast of Severny Island north to nearly 74°24’ N.
- 1834 – George Back descends the Back River to Chantrey Inlet.
- 1837 – Glazunov ascends the Unalakleet and portages to the middle Yukon.
- 1837–39 – Peter Warren Dease and Thomas Simpson reach Point Barrow from the east; following two summers they map the region from Point Turnagain to just north of the Castor and Pollux River on the Boothia Peninsula and chart the coastline of "Victoria Land" (Victoria Island) from Point Back to Point Parry.
- 1838 – Pyotr Malakhov reaches Nulato, near the confluence of the Koyukuk and Yukon.
- 1838–40 – Jules Dumont d'Urville discovers the Joinville Island group and Adélie Land (138°21′ E).
- 1839 – John Balleny discovers the Balleny Islands and sights the Sabrina Coast (121° E).
- 1840 – An expedition led by United States Navy Lieutenant Charles Wilkes discovers Wilkes Land, mapping 2,414 kilometres (1,500 mi) of the Antarctic coast from Piner Bay (140°E) to the Shackleton Ice Shelf (97°E), proving that Antarctica is a continent.
- 1841–43 – James Clark Ross discovers the Ross Sea, reaches 78°09′30″S, and discovers the active volcano Mount Erebus on Ross Island, the Ross Ice Shelf, and Victoria Land. He also sights Snow Hill, Seymour, and James Ross Island.
- 1845 – John Bell discovers the Porcupine River, which he descends to its confluence with the Yukon.
- 1846 – Candido José da Costa Cardoso discovers Lake Malawi.
- 1846 – Rodrigues Graça travels from Angola to southwestern Katanga.
- 1846–47 – Scottish explorer John Rae maps over 1,046 kilometres (650 mi) of coastline from Lord Mayor Bay to Cape Crozier, discovering Committee Bay.
- c. 1847–48 – António da Silva Porto reaches the upper Zambezi.
- 1848 – German missionary Johannes Rebmann is the first European to sight Mount Kilimanjaro.
- 1849 – David Livingstone and William Cotton Oswell cross the Kalahari Desert to Lake Ngami.
- 1849 – James Clark Ross charts 240 kilometres (150 mi) of the west coast of Somerset Island south to Cape Coulman, discovering Peel Sound.
- 1850 – Edwin De Haven sails up Wellington Channel, discovering and naming "Grinnell Land" (the Grinnell Peninsula, which forms the northwestern corner of Devon Island).
- 1850–54 – Robert McClure transits the Northwest Passage (by boat and sledge); he and his men also chart some 2,736 kilometres (1,700 mi) of new coastline, consisting of the entire coast of Banks Island and much of the northwestern coast of Victoria Island (from just east of Point Reynolds in the north to Prince Albert Sound in the south), in the process discovering Prince of Wales Strait and McClure Strait.
- 1851 – Rae charts over 965 kilometres (600 mi) of the southern coastline of Victoria Island, from Cape Back to Pelly Point.
- 1851 – Erasmus Ommanney, Sherard Osborn and William Browne chart the northern half of Prince of Wales Island, Osborn west to Sherard Osborn Point (72°20’ N) and Browne east to Pandora Island; meanwhile, Robert D. Aldrich charts the west coast of the Bathurst Island group north to Cape Aldrich (about 76°11’ N, on Île Vanier) and Dr. Abraham Bradford charts the east coast of Melville Island north to Bradford Point.
- 1851 – Robert Campbell descends the Pelly to the Yukon, which he descends to its confluence with the Porcupine, reaching Fort Yukon.
- 1851–52 – William Kennedy and Joseph René Bellot discover Bellot Strait and cross Prince of Wales Island east to west, reaching Ommanney Bay.
- 1852 – Edward Augustus Inglefield reaches 78° 28’ N, entering Smith Sound; also charts Jones Sound as far west as 84° 10’ W.
- 1852–53 – Edward Belcher sails two of his squadron to the northwestern coast of the Grinnell Peninsula, wintering at 77° 52’ N, 97° W; later circumnavigates the peninsula via Arthur Strait (now Fiord), discovering Cornwall and North Kent.
- 1853 – Richard Vesey Hamilton and George Henry Richards chart the Sabine Peninsula of Melville Island from Cape Mudge east to Bradford Point; the latter, along with Sherard Osborn, also charts the northern coast of Bathurst Island.
- 1853 – George Mecham discovers Prince Patrick and Eglinton Islands and charts the southwest corner of Melville Island; along with Francis Leopold McClintock, he charts nearly the entire coast of Prince Patrick; McClintock also charts the northwest coast of Melville Island, from Cape Fisher northwest to Cape Scott and south along its west coast to Cape Purchase.
- 1853–54 – American explorer Elisha Kent Kane and his men chart the Kane Basin and discover Kennedy Channel. One of his men, William Morton, reaches as far north as Kap Constitution (81°22’N).
- 1853–56 – Livingstone becomes the first to traverse Africa from west to east, traveling from Luanda in Angola to Quelimane in Mozambique; also explores much of the upper Zambezi and discovers and names Victoria Falls.
- 1854 – Rae charts the Boothia Peninsula from the Castor and Pollux River north to Point de la Guiche, discovering Rae Strait and proving the insularity of King William Island.
- 1858 – Richard Francis Burton and John Hanning Speke discover Lake Tanganyika and Lake Victoria.
- 1859 – McClintock charts the remaining 193 kilometres (120 mi) of the continental coastline of America (on the west coast of the Boothia Peninsula), while his companion Allen Young charts the southern half of Prince of Wales Island.
- 1860–61 – Robert O'Hara Burke and William Wills are the first to cross Australia from south to north, traveling from Melbourne to the Flinders River.
- 1862 – Speke discovers the Nile flowing from the northern end of Lake Victoria.
- 1862 – Ivan Lukin ascends the Yukon to Fort Yukon.
- 1864 – Samuel Baker discovers "Luta Nzige" (Lake Albert); in the distance he sights the Mountains of the Moon (the Rwenzori).
- 1865 – Edward Whymper is the first to ascend the Matterhorn.
- 1866–68 – A group of French colonial officers, led by Ernest Doudard de Lagrée, undertakes a naval exploration and scientific expedition of the Mekong River and into Southern China.
- 1869 – American naturalist John Wesley Powell leads the first expedition to travel the entire length of the Colorado River through the Grand Canyon.
- 1869–70 – Carl Koldewey and Julius von Payer explore the east coast of Greenland from 74°18’ to 77°01’N.
- 1871 – Charles Francis Hall reaches Robeson Channel, sailing his ship as far north as 82°11’N; he later travels by sledge to 83°05’N.
- 1872 – William Adams proves the insularity of Bylot Island.
- 1873–74 – Karl Weyprecht and Von Payer discover and name Franz Josef Land.
- 1875–76 – George Nares sails as far north as 82°24’N; the following year, Albert Hastings Markham sledges to 83°20’26" N, while Pelham Aldrich sledges along the northern coast of Ellesmere Island east to Alert Point and Lewis A. Beaumont explores the northwestern coast of Greenland.
- 1875–77 – Henry Morton Stanley circumnavigates both Lakes Tanganyika and Victoria, sights Lake George, and descends the Lualaba and Congo to the sea.
- 1876 – Luigi D'Albertis ascends over 800 kilometres (500 mi) up the Fly River in New Guinea.
- 1878–79 – Adolf Erik Nordenskiöld is the first to transit the Northeast Passage.
- 1881–83 – Adolphus Greely explores the interior of Ellesmere Island, discovering Lake Hazen; one of his men, James Booth Lockwood, crosses the island and reaches Greely Fiord, as well as sledging eastwards to the vicinity of Kap Washington (reaching 83° 23’08" N in the process).
- 1883–84 – German-American anthropologist Franz Boas is the first to see Nettilling Lake on Baffin Island.
- 1887–89 – Stanley traverses the Ituri Rainforest, explores the Rwenzori, and follows the Semliki to its source (which he names Lake Edward).
- 1892 – Robert Peary discovers and names Independence Bay and Peary Land.
- 1893–96 – Fridtjof Nansen and Hjalmar Johansen sledge to 86°13'06" N; their ship, the Fram, under Otto Sverdrup, drifts in the ice from the New Siberian Islands west to the northwest coast of Spitsbergen, reaching 85°55'05" N—a new record for a ship.
- 1898–1902 – Sverdrup and Gunnar Isachsen chart the western coast of Ellesmere Island and discover and name Axel Heiberg, Ellef Ringnes, Amund Ringnes, and King Christian Islands.

== 20th century ==
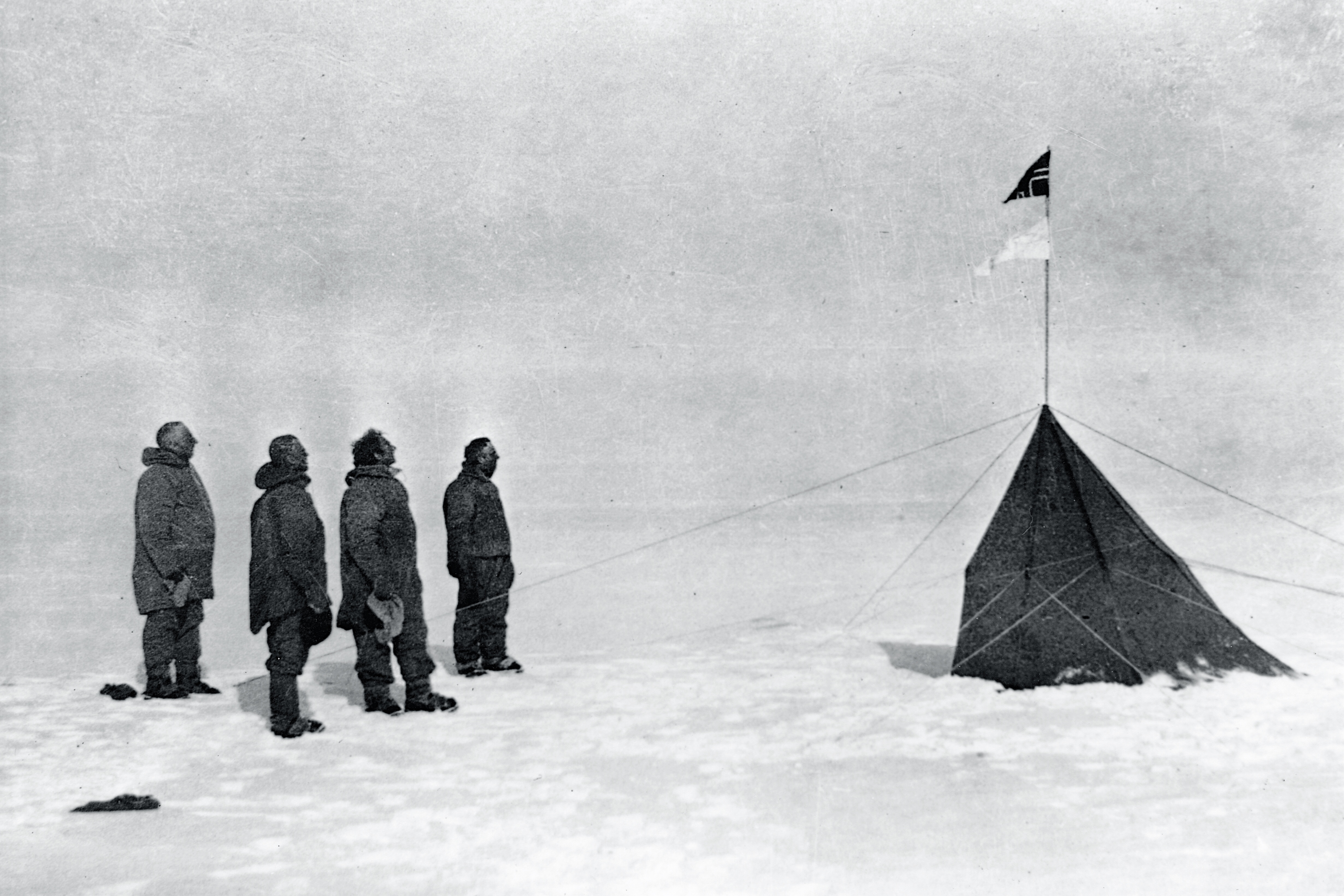
Amundsen's party at the South Pole, December 1911. From left to right: Amundsen, Hanssen, Hassel and Wisting (photo by fifth member Bjaaland).

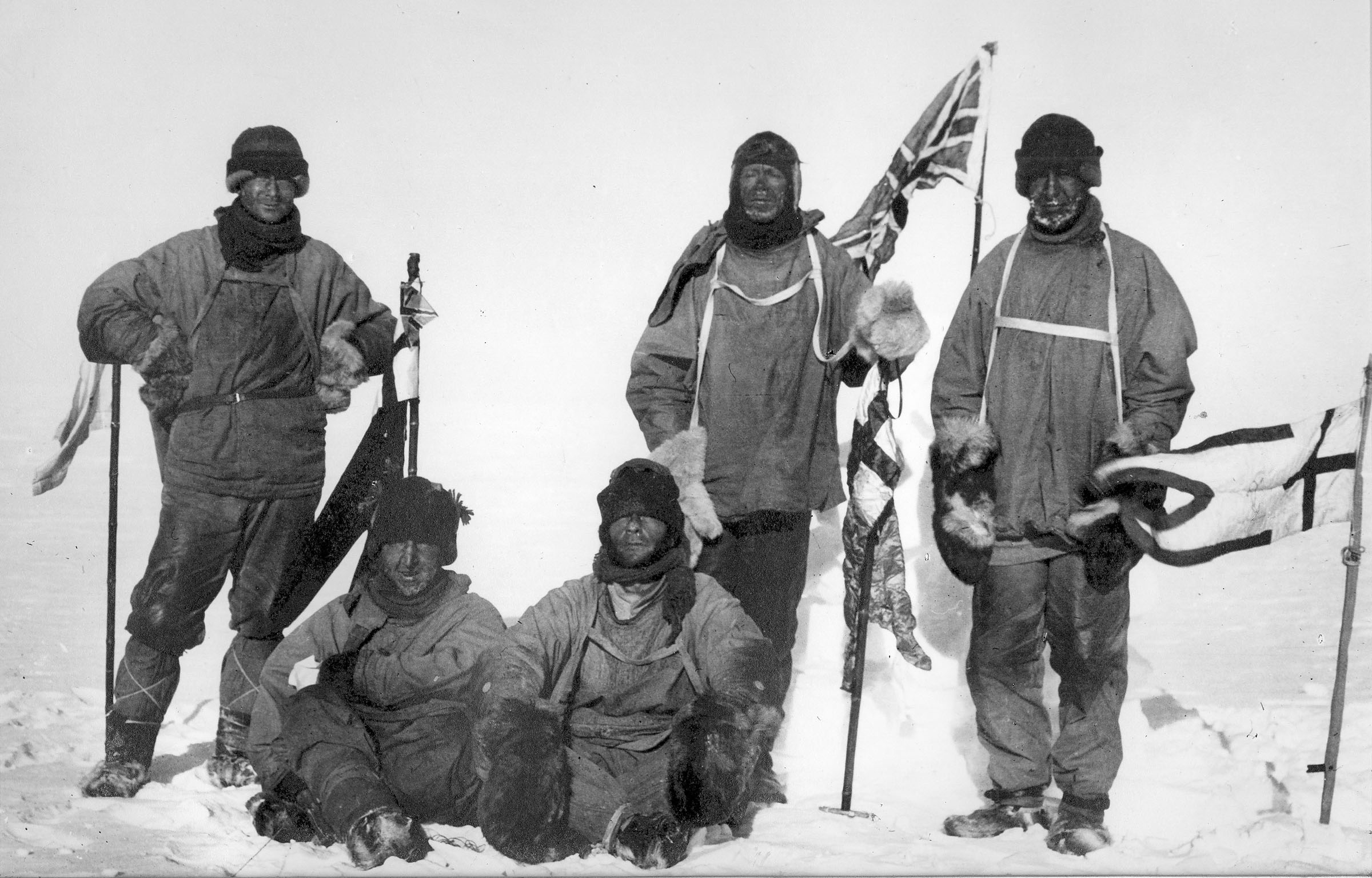
Scott's party at the South Pole, 18 January 1912. L to R: (standing) Wilson, Scott, Oates; (seated) Bowers, Edgar Evans.

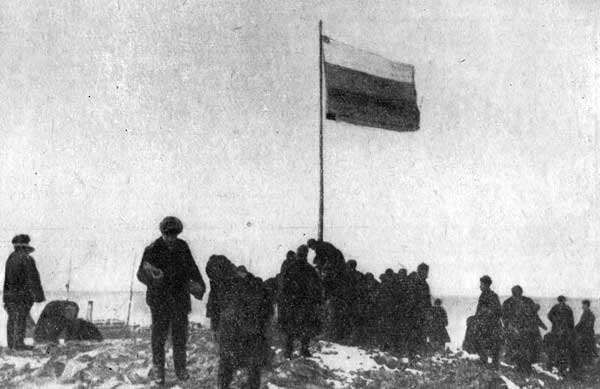
Severnaya Zemlya – raising of the Russian flag in 1913.

- 1900 – Peary explores the north coast of Greenland from Cape Washington to Cape Clarence Wyckoff, on the way reaching Cape Morris Jesup, the most northern point of mainland Greenland.
- 1902–04 – Robert Falcon Scott traces the length of the Ross Ice Shelf, discovers the Edward VII Peninsula, reaches about 82°11’ S (in the process tracing 600 kilometres (370 mi) of the west coast of the shelf), crosses the Transantarctic Mountains and discovers the Antarctic Plateau, penetrating nearly 240 kilometres (150 mi) into it; he is also the first to see the dry valleys of the Antarctic.
- 1903–06 – Norwegian polar explorer Roald Amundsen leads the first expedition to traverse the entire Northwest Passage, in the sloop Gjøa; Godfred Hansen, his second-in-command, charts the east coast of Victoria Island north to Cape Nansen (72°02'N, 104°45'W).
- 1906–07 – Ludvig Mylius-Erichsen and Johan Peter Koch chart the northeast coast of Greenland from Cape Bismarck (76°42' N) to Cape Clarence Wyckoff (82°52' N), discovering Danmark Fjord.
- 1908–09 – Frederick Cook and Peary each claim to have reached the North Pole—the former is a fraud, the latter widely doubted.
- 1910–11 – Bernhard Hantzsch crosses Baffin Island from Cumberland Sound to the Koukdjuak River, exploring the west coast of the island north to 68°45’N.
- 1911–12 – Amundsen becomes the first person to reach the South Pole. Scott and his team reach the Pole over a month later, all perishing on the return journey.
- 1913 – Frederick Bailey and Henry Morshead on their exploration of the Tsangpo Gorge discover the route of the Yarlung Tsangpo river.
- 1913–14 – Boris Vilkitsky and Per Novopashennyy discover Severnaya Zemlya, surveying parts of its eastern coast from Mys Arkticheskiy to Mys Vaygacha (its southeast point), as well as much of its south coast west to Mys Neupokoyeva.
- 1915–17 – Vilhjalmur Stefansson discovers Brock, Mackenzie King, Borden, Meighen, and Lougheed Islands; one of his men, Storker T. Storkerson, charts part of the northeast coast of Victoria Island, discovering the Storkerson Peninsula and Stefansson Island.
- 1924–29 – Joseph Dewey Soper explores the interior of Baffin Island before surveying its west coast north to Hantzsch River.
- 1926 – Amundsen, Lincoln Ellsworth and Umberto Nobile in the airship Norge are the first definitely known to have sighted the North Pole.
- 1927 – George P. Putnam charts the north coast of the Foxe Peninsula from Cape Dorchester to Bowman Bay.
- 1930–32 – Georgy Ushakov and Nikolay Urvantsev survey the entire coast of Severnaya Zemlya, showing it to be made up of four main islands: October Revolution, Komsomolets, Pioneer, and Bolshevik Islands—in all surveying some 2,200 kilometres (1,400 mi) of coastline and interior.
- 1932 – W. A. Poole discovers Prince Charles Island.
- 1934 – Richard E. Byrd discovers and names Roosevelt Island.
- 1937–41 – Thomas and Ella Manning map the west coast of Baffin Island from the Hantzsch River to Steensby Inlet.
- 1940 – Byrd discovers Thurston Island, first believing it to be a peninsula of the Antarctic continent.
- 1948 – E. C. Kerslake charts Prince Charles, Air Force, and Foley Islands.
- 1950 – Maurice Herzog and Louis Lachenal of the French Annapurna expedition become the first climbers to reach the summit of an 8,000-metre peak.
- 1953 – Edmund Hillary and Tenzing Norgay are the first to ascend Mount Everest.
- 1954 – Lino Lacedelli and Achille Compagnoni are the first to ascend K2 on the Italian Karakoram expedition.
- 1957 – Finn Ronne discovers Berkner Island.

== See also ==
- Timeline of maritime migration and exploration
