= Dulgalakh =

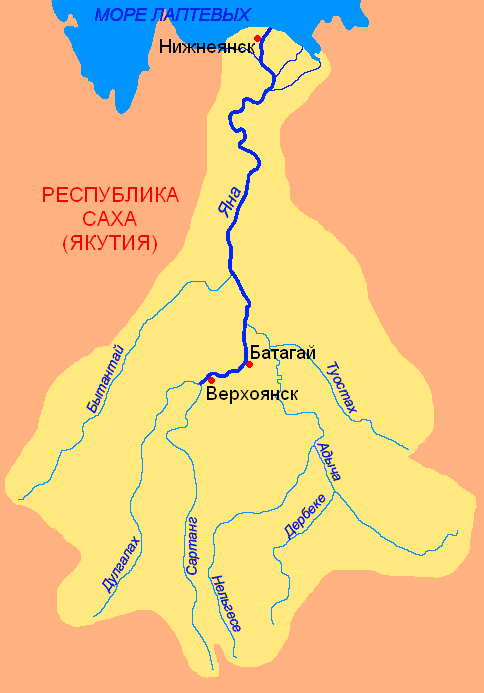
- Basin of the Yana.
- Native name: Дулҕалаах (Russian); Дулҕалаах (Yakut)

Location
- Country: Yakutia, Russia

Physical characteristics
- Mouth: Yana
  - location: Confluence with the Sartang
  - coordinates: 67°27′51″N 133°14′51″E
  - elevation: 132 m (433 ft)
- Length: 507 km (315 mi)
- Basin size: 27,300 km^{2} (10,500 sq mi)
- Discharge
  - average: 101 m^{3}/s (3,600 cu ft/s)

Basin features
- Progression: Yana→ Laptev Sea

The Dulgalakh (Russian: Дулгалах; Yakut: Дулҕалаах, Dulğalaax) is a river in Yakutia, the left, western source river of the Yana. Its length is 507 km (315 mi) and its basin size 27,300 square kilometres (10,541 sq mi).

== Course ==
The Dulgalakh rises on the central Verkhoyansk Range, south of the southern slopes of the Arkachan Plateau. It flows through Kobyaysky and Verkhoyansky districts. Above Verkhoyansk it merges with the Sartang forming the Yana.

== See also ==
- List of rivers of Russia
- Yana Plateau
- Yana-Oymyakon Highlands§Hydrography
