= Sartang (river) =

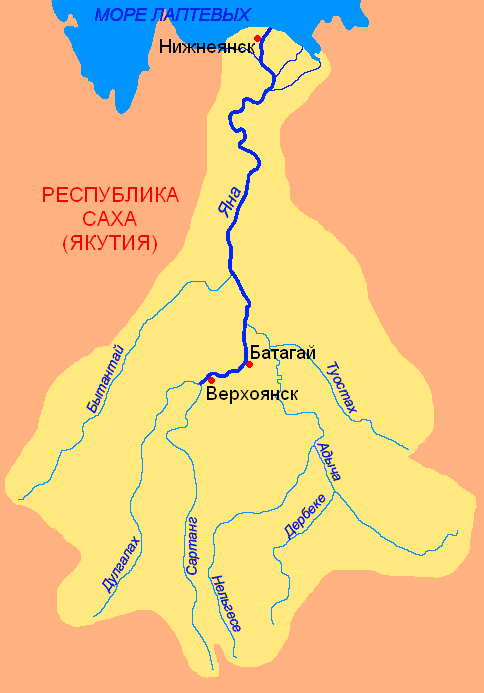
- Basin of the Yana.
- Native name: Сартаҥ (Yakut)

Location
- Country: Yakutia, Russia

Physical characteristics
- Source
  - elevation: 2,295 m (7,530 ft)
- Mouth: Yana
  - location: Confluence with the Dulgalakh
  - coordinates: 67.4591°N 133.2489°E
  - elevation: 132 m (433 ft)
- Length: 620 km (390 mi)
- Basin size: 17,800 km^{2} (6,900 sq mi)
- Discharge
  - average: 48 m^{3}/s (1,700 cu ft/s)

Basin features
- Progression: Yana→ Laptev Sea

The Sartang (Russian: Сартанг; Yakut: Сартаҥ, Sartaŋ) is a river in the Republic of Sakha in Russia. It is the eastern, right source river of the Yana, and is 620 kilometres (390 mi) long, with a drainage basin of 17,800 square kilometres (6,900 mi^{2}).

== Course ==
The river begins in the Verkhoyansk Range at an elevation of 2,295 metres (7,530 ft). From this area, the Sartang heads north along the Barylas, and continues north along the Yana Plateau between the Verkhoyansk Range to the west and the Chersky Range to the east. Around 10 kilometres (6 mi) southwest of Verkhoyansk, the Sartang joins the river Dulgalakh to form the river Yana.

The area around the Sartang consists of taiga.

== See also ==
- List of rivers of Russia
- Yana-Oymyakon Highlands§Hydrography
