= Ilya Perfilyev =

Russian explorer (1583–1659)

Ilya Perfilyev (Perfiryev) (Russian: Илья Перфильев (Перфирьев)) (1583–1659), was a Russian explorer, polar seafarer and a founder of Verkhoyansk. In the summer of 1633 he headed a group, consisted of merchant-and-industrial people and Yenisey and Tobolsk Cossacks. In 1634 he discovered the Yana River and the Yana-Indigirka Lowland.
