= Yana (river) =

River in Sakha, Russia

Yana Яна / Дьааҥы
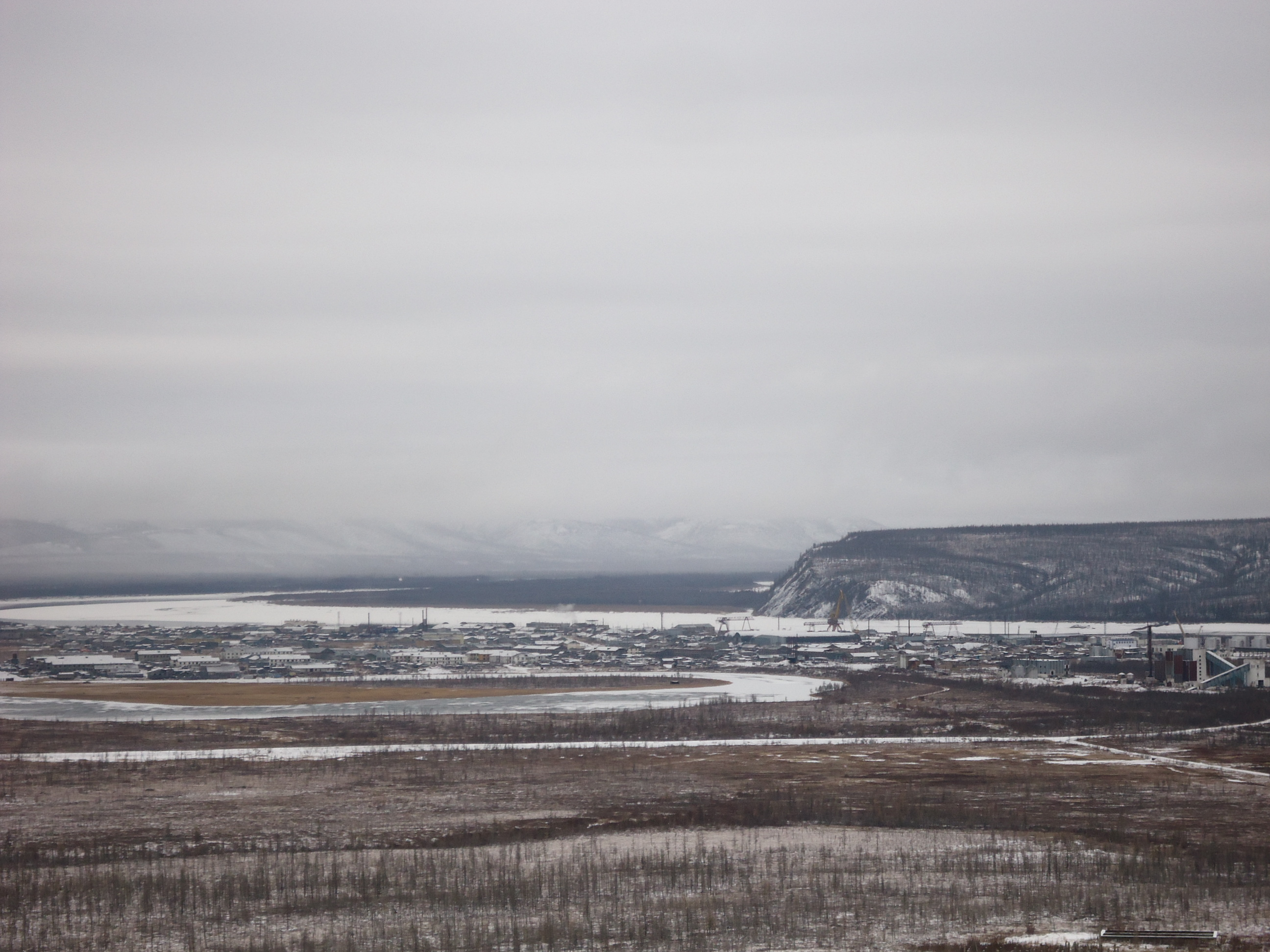
- The Yana flowing past Ust-Kuyga

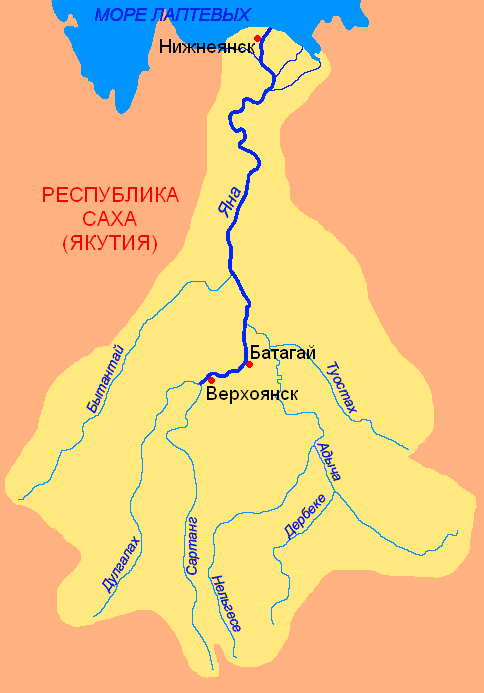
- Basin of the Yana

- Mouth location in Yakutia, Russia

Location
- Country: Russia

Physical characteristics
- Source
  - location: Confluence of Sartang and Dulgalakh
  - coordinates: 67.4634°N 133.2517°E
- Mouth
  - location: Laptev Sea
  - coordinates: 71°32′14″N 136°39′11″E
  - elevation: 0 m (0 ft)
- Length: 872 km (542 mi)
- Basin size: 238,000 km^{2} (92,000 sq mi)
- Discharge
  - average: 1,110 m^{3}/s (39,000 cu ft/s)

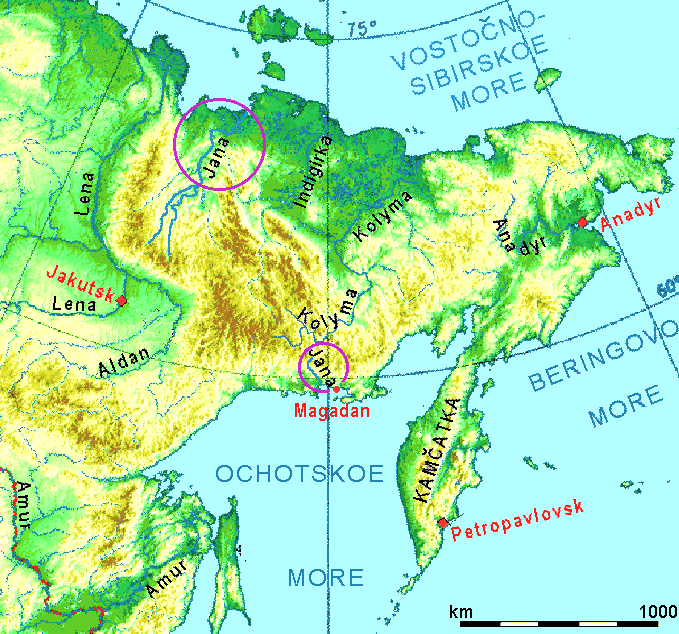
Map showing the two Yana Rivers in the Russian Far East. The river of this article is the northern one which It flows into the Laptev Sea.

The Yana (Russian: Я́на, IPA: [ˈjanə]; Yakut: Дьааҥы, romanized: Caañı) is a river in Sakha in Russia, located between the Lena to the west and the Indigirka to the east.

== Course ==
It is 872 kilometres (542 mi) long, and its drainage basin covers 238,000 square kilometres (92,000 mi^{2}). Including its longest source river, the Sartang, it is 1,492 km (927 mi) long. Its annual discharge totals approximately 35 cubic kilometres (28,000,000 acre⋅ft). Most of this discharge occurs in May and June as the ice on the river breaks up. The Yana freezes up on the surface in October and stays under the ice until late May or early June. In the Verkhoyansk area, it stays frozen to the bottom for 70 to 110 days, and partly frozen for 220 days of the year.

The river begins at the confluence of the rivers Sartang and Dulgalakh in the Yana-Oymyakon Highlands. It flows north across the vast Yana-Indigirka Lowland, part of the greater East Siberian Lowland, shared with the Indigirka to the east. As the river flows into the Yana Bay of the Laptev Sea, it forms a huge river delta covering 10,200 square kilometres (3,900 mi^{2}). Yarok is a large flat island located east of the main mouths of the Yana.

There are approximately 40,000 lakes in the Yana basin, including both alpine lakes formed from glaciation in the Verkhoyansk Mountains (lowlands were always too dry for glaciation) and overflow lakes on the marshy plains in the north of the basin. The whole Yana basin is under continuous permafrost and most is larch woodland grading to tundra north of about 70°N, though trees extend into suitable microhabitats right to the delta.

Verkhoyansk, Batagay, Ust-Kuyga, and Nizhneyansk are the main ports on the Yana.

The Yana basin is the site of the so-called Pole of Cold of Russia, where the lowest recorded temperatures in the Northern Hemisphere are found. In the winter, temperatures in the centre of the basin average as low as −51 °C (−60 °F) and have reached as low as −71 °C (−96 °F); in the mountains it is believed that temperatures have reached −82 °C (−116 °F). Yakut folklore says that, at such temperatures, if you shout to a friend and they cannot hear you, it is because the words have frozen in the air. However, when spring comes the words "thaw" and one can hear everything that was said months ago.

=== Tributaries ===
The main tributaries of the Yana are the Adycha, Oldzho, Sartang and Abyrabyt from the right, and the Dulgalakh, Bytantay, Tykakh and Baky from the left. Most of these tributaries are short rivers flowing from the Verkhoyansk Mountains or the Chersky Range, part of the East Siberian Mountains.

== History ==
Evidence of modern human habitation was found in the delta at the Yana RHS (Rhinoceros Horn Site) as early as 32,000 years ago. These people, designated as "Ancient North Siberians", genetically diverged 38,000 years ago from Western Eurasians, soon after the Western Eurasians split from East Asians.

In 1633–38 Ilya Perfilyev and Ivan Rebrov sailed down the Lena and east along the Arctic coast to the mouth of the Yana and reached the Indigirka estuary. In 1636–42 Elisei Buza followed essentially the same route. In 1638–40, Poznik Ivanov ascended a tributary of the lower Lena, crossed the Verkhoyansk Range to the upper Yana and then crossed the Chersky Range to the Indigirka.

In 1892–1894 Baron Eduard Von Toll, accompanied by expedition leader Alexander von Bunge, carried out geological surveys in the basin of the Yana (among other Far-eastern Siberian rivers) on behalf of the Russian Imperial Academy of Sciences. During one year and two days the expedition covered 25,000 kilometres (16,000 mi), of which 4,200 kilometres (2,600 mi) were up rivers, carrying out geodesic surveys en route.

== See also ==
- List of rivers of Russia
- Yana Plateau

== General References ==
- William Barr, Baron Eduard Von Toll's Last Expedition. Arctic, Sept 1980.
- Alexander von Bunge & Baron Eduard Von Toll, The Expedition to the New Siberian Islands and the Jana country, equipped by the Imperial Academy of Sciences. 1887.
