= Bibby Island =

Island in Nunavut, Canada

- Location within Nunavut Location within Canada

Geography
- Location: Hudson Bay
- Coordinates: 61°53′N 093°05′W
- Archipelago: Arctic Archipelago

Administration
- Canada
- Nunavut: Nunavut
- Region: Kivalliq

Demographics
- Population: Uninhabited

Bibby Island (variously named on maps as Bibyos, Sir Bibby, Sir Bibby's, Sir Bybie's, and Sir Bibye's) was named for Sir Bibye (Bibby) Lake, governor of the Hudson's Bay Company from 1712 to 1743.

It is one of several uninhabited Canadian Arctic islands in the Kivalliq Region, Nunavut, Canada. It is located within western Hudson Bay, 41 km (25 mi) southwest of the community of Whale Cove and 20 km (12 mi) south of the former trading post and mining settlement of Tavani.

Other islands in the vicinity include Airartuuq, Flattop, Imiligaarjuk, Imilijjuaq, Irik, Ivuniraarjuq, Kayak, and Walrus.

== Geography ==
The large, low island is characterized by till and boulders, separated from Neville Bay's shore by a narrow, shallow channel.
