= Flattop Island (Nunavut) =

Island in Nunavut, Canada

- Location within Nunavut Location within Canada

Geography
- Location: Hudson Bay
- Coordinates: 62°02′N 092°57′W
- Archipelago: Arctic Archipelago

Administration
- Canada
- Nunavut: Nunavut
- Region: Kivalliq

Demographics
- Population: Uninhabited

Flattop Island is one of several uninhabited Canadian arctic islands in Kivalliq Region, Nunavut, Canada. It is located within western Hudson Bay, 26.1 km (16.2 mi) from the community of Whale Cove.

Other islands in the vicinity include Airartuuq Island, Bibby Island, Imiligaarjuk Island, Imilijjuaq Island, Irik Island, Ivuniraarjuq Island, Kayak Island, and Walrus Island.
