= Airartuuq Island =

Island in Nunavut, Canada

- Location in Nunavut Location in Canada

Geography
- Location: Hudson Bay
- Coordinates: 61°48′N 092°56′W
- Archipelago: Arctic Archipelago

Administration
- Canada
- Nunavut: Nunavut
- Region: Kivalliq

Demographics
- Population: Uninhabited

Airartuuq Island is one of several uninhabited Canadian arctic islands in Kivalliq Region, Nunavut, Canada. It is located within western Hudson Bay, 32.7 km (20.3 mi) from the abandoned trading post of Tavani.

Other islands in the vicinity include Bibby Island, Flattop Island, Imiligaarjuk Island, Imilijjuaq Island, Ivuniraarjuq Island, and Walrus Island.
