= Kivallirmiut =

Ethnic group in Nunavut, Canada

Total population
- 3,000

Regions with significant populations
- Nunavut

Languages
- Inuktitut

Religion
- Christianity, Inuit religion

Related ethnic groups
- Copper Inuit

Kivallirmiut, also called the Caribou Inuit (Inuktitut: Kivallirmiut/ᑭᕙᓪᓕᕐᒥᐅᑦ), barren-ground caribou hunters, are Inuit who live west of Hudson Bay in Kivalliq Region, Nunavut, between 61° and 65° N and 90° and 102° W in Northern Canada.

The Danish Fifth Thule Expedition of 1921–1924 led by Knud Rasmussen called them the Caribou Eskimo. Kivallirmiut are the southernmost subgroup of the Central Inuit.

Approximate location of Kivallirmiut bands at the end of the 19th century

== Groups ==
Ahialmiut

Ahiarmiut (Ahialmiut) relied on caribou year-round. They spent summers on the Qamanirjuaq calving grounds at Qamanirjuaq Lake ("huge lake adjoining a river at both ends") and spent winters following the herd to the north.

Akilinirmiut

Akilinirmiut were located in the Thelon River area by the Akiliniq Hills (A-ki, meaning "the other side") to the north of Beverly Lake and also visible above Aberdeen Lake. Some lived northwest of Baker Lake (Qamani'tuuaq), along with Qairnirmiut and Hauniqturmiut. Many relocated to Aberdeen Lake because of starvation or education opportunities.

Hanningajurmiut

Hanningajurmiut, or Hanningaruqmiut, or Hanningajulinmiut {"the people of the place that lies across"} lived at Garry Lake, south of the Utkuhiksalingmiut. Many Hanningajurmiut starved in 1958 when the caribou bypassed their traditional hunting grounds, but the 31 who survived were relocated to Baker. Most never returned permanently to Garry Lake.

Harvaqtuurmiut

Harvaqtuurmiut were a northern group located in the region of Kazan River, Yathkyed Lake, Kunwak River, Beverly Lake, and Dubawnt River. By the early 1980s, most lived at Baker Lake.

Hauniqtuurmiut

Hauneqtormiut, or Hauniqtuurmiut, or Kangiqliniqmiut, ("dwellers where bones abound") were a smaller band who lived near the coast, south of Qairnirmiuts, around the Wilson River and Ferguson River. By the 1980s, they were absorbed into subgroups at Whale Cove and Rankin Inlet.

Ahiarmiut

Ahiarmiut ("people from beyond" or "the out-of-the-way dwellers") were located at the banks of the Kazan River, Ennadai Lake, Little Dubawnt Lake (Kamilikuak), and north of Thlewiaza (Kugjuaq; "Big River"). Relocation’s in the 1950s included to Henik Lake, Whale Cove, and by the 1980s, most were in Eskimo Point, now Arviat.

Paallirmiut

Paallirmiut ("people of the willow"), or Padlermiut ("people from the Padlei River region"), or Padleimiut were the most populous band. They were located south of the Hauniqtuurmiut and Harvaqtuurmiut bands. Paallirmiut were split into a coast-visiting (Arviat) subgroup who spent the hunting season on the lower Maguse River, and an interior subgroup who stayed year-round in the Yathkyed Lake to Dubawnt Lake area. After Hudson's Bay Company ships discontinued trading the Keewatin coast in 1790, Paallirmiut travelled to Prince of Wales Fort for trade. The Arvia'juaq and Qikiqtaarjuk National Historic Site is the band's historic summer camping site. By the 1980s, most lived in Eskimo Point (Arviat).

Qaernermiut

Qaernermiut ("dwellers of the flat land"), or Qairnirmiut ("bedrock people"), or Kinipetu (Franz Boas, 1901), Kenepetu, or Kenipitu, a northern group, were located from the sea coast between Chesterfield Inlet to Rankin Inlet across to their main area around Baker Lake and some even to Beverly Lake. By the early 1980s, most lived at Baker Lake.

Utkuhiksalingmiut

Utkuhiksalingmiut ("people who have cooking pots"), were located in the Chantrey Inlet area around the Back River, near Baker Lake. They made their pots (utkusik) from soapstone of the area, therefore their name. Their dialect is a variant of Natsilingmiutut, spoken by the Netsilik.

== Origin ==
Lacking an early written language, Kivallirmiut pre-history is unclear. There are three main theories:

1. Kivallirmiut are the descendants of an interior Eskimo culture that spread in Arctic North America and Greenland. (Birket-Smith, 1930; Rasmussen, 1930; Czonka, 1995)
2. Kivallirmiut are the descendants of Thule people who had migrated from Alaska. (Mathiassen, 1927)
3. Kivallirmiut were the 17th century descendants of a migratory subgroup of Copper Inuit from the Arctic coast. (Taylor, 1972; Burch, 1978) While this is the most current hypothesis, it is still unproven. (Czonka, 1998)

== History ==
Kivallirmiut ancestors originally went back and forth between the Barrenlands to hunt the Beverly and the Qamanirjuaq ("Kaminuriak") caribou herds during seasonal migrations; and the Hudson Bay (Tariurjuaq) for whaling and to fish during the winters. The Chipewyan Sayisi Dene were caribou hunters also, but they stayed inland year-round. Because of waning caribou populations during extended periods, including the 18th century, the Dene moved away from the area, and the Kivallirmiut began to live inland year-round harvesting enough caribou to get through winters without reliance on coastal life.

Regular contact between the Kivallirmiut and European explorers and missionaries began around 1717 after the establishment of a permanent settlement in Churchill, Manitoba. The contact included access to guns, along with an introduction to trapping and whaling. Father Alphonse Gasté, a Christian missionary, made diary notes about peaceful relations between settled Kivallirmiut and migratory Dene that he met along the Kazan River in the late 19th century. Explorer Joseph Tyrrell estimated the "Caribou Eskimo" numbered nearly 2,000 when he led the Geological Survey of Canada's Barren Lands expeditions of 1893 and 1894. Eugene Arima classifies the Hauniqtuurmiut, Ha'vaqtuurmiut, Paallirmiut, and Qairnirmiut as Kivallirmiut "southern, latter" bands: through the end of the 19th century, they were primarily coastal saltwater hunters, but with firearm ammunition from commercial whalers, they were able to live inland year-round hunting caribou without augmenting their diet on sea life. (Arima 1975)

Regular trade dates to the early 20th century and missionaries arrived soon thereafter, developing a written language, challenged by a variety of pronunciations and naming rules. In the Arctic spring of 1922, explorer/anthropologist Kaj Birket-Smith and Rasmussen encountered and reported on the lives of Harvaqtuurmiut and Paallirmiut. Some hunting years were better than others as resident caribou and migratory herds grew or declined, but Kivallirmiut populations dwindled through the decades. Starvation was not uncommon. During a bleak period in the 1920s, some of the Kivallirmiut made their way to Hudson's Bay Company outposts and small, scattered villages on their own. In the early 1950s the Canadian media reported the starvation deaths of 60 Kivallirmiut. The government was slow to act but in 1959 moved the surviving 60, of around the 120 that were alive in 1950, to settlements such as Baker Lake and Eskimo Point. This set off an Arctic settlement push by the Canadian government where those Inuit living in the north were encouraged to abandon their traditional way of life and settle in villages and outposts of Northern Canada. Author/explorer Farley Mowat visited the Ihalmiut in the 1940s and 1950s, writing extensively about the Ihalmiut.

== Ethnography ==
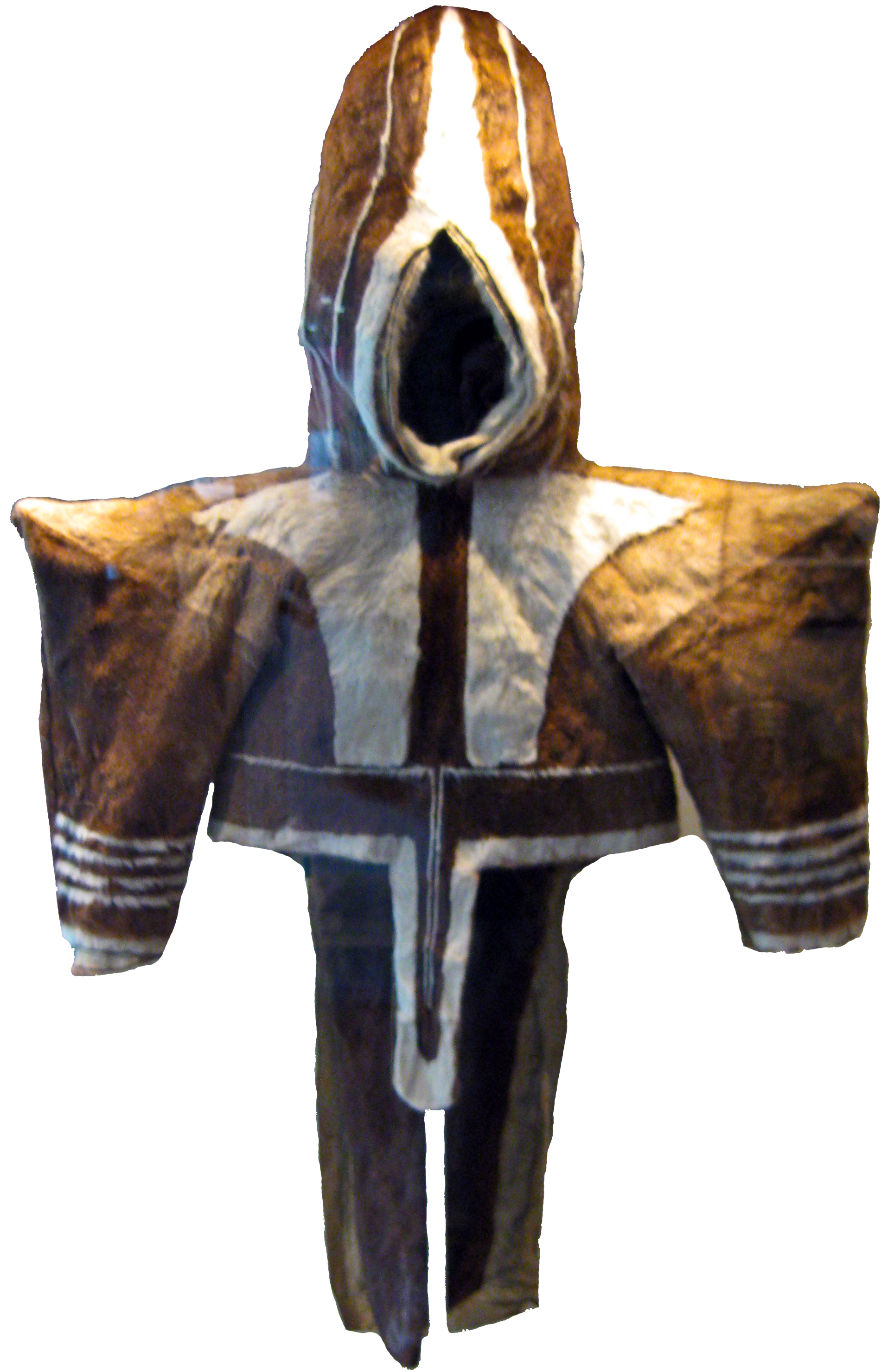
Early 20th Century Inuit parka

Kivallirmiut were nomadic and summers were time of relocation to reach different game and to trade. In addition to hunting, they fished in local lakes and rivers (kuuk). Kivallirmiut northern bands from as far away as Dubawnt River travelled on trading trips to Churchill via Thlewiaza River for extra supplies. The nomadic nature made the people and their dogs into strong walkers and sledders who carried loads of implements, bedding, and tents. Kayaks portaged people and baggage in rivers and lakes.

Kayaks were also used for hunting at water crossings during annual migration. Wounded animals were tied together, brought ashore, and killed there to avoid the struggle of dragging dead animals. Every part of the caribou was important. The antlers were used for tools, such as the ulu ("knife") and snow goggles (Inuktitut: ilgaak or iggaak) to prevent snow blindness. The hides were used for kamik (footwear) and clothing, including the anorak and amauti, using caribou sinew to piece the articles together, and worn in many layers. Mittens were lined with fur, down, and moss. While spring-gathered caribou skins were thin, sleek, and handsome, summer-gathered caribou skins were stronger and warmer. Hides were used also for tents, tools, and containers.

Kivallirmiut lived within a patrilocal social unit. The male elder, the ihumataq ("group leader"), was the centralized authority. There was no other form of authority within subgroups or within the Kivallirmiut in general. Like other Inuit, Kivallirmiut practised an animist religion, including beliefs that everything had a soul or energy with a disposition or personality. The protector was Pinga, a female figure, the object of taboos, who brings the dead to Adlivun. The supreme force was Hila ("air"), a male figure and the source of misfortune. Christian missionaries established posts in the Barren Lands between 1910 and 1930, converting (siqqitiq) most Inuit from the traditional Inuit religion to Christianity, though some, nonetheless, maintain remnants of their traditional shamanistic beliefs.

Kivallirmiut are Inuktitut speakers. Inuktitut has six dialects, of which Kivallirmiut speak the Kivalliq dialect, and that is further divided into the sub dialects, Ahiarmiut, Hauniqturmiut, Paallirmiut, and Qairnirmiut. The Utkuhiksalingmiut's dialect, Utkuhiksalingmiutut, is similar to but distinct from their neighbours' Natsilingmiutut. Like other central Canadian Arctic people, Kivallirmiut participated in nipaquhiit ("games done with sounds or with noises"). The Kivallirmiut genre lacked typical katajjaq ("throat sounds") but added narration missing amongst other Inuit groups.

== Modern-day adaptation ==
Re-settlement

There are several books written on the hardships and the 1950s federal government re-settlement of Kivallirmiut. With re-settlement to coastal communities, the nomadic nuunamiut ("people of the land") ways ended and Kivallirmiut joined tareumiut ("people of the sea"), the maritime Inuit being a more stable group. Even with federal assistance, adapting to displacement in fewer and larger towns proved difficult, resulting in high unemployment, domestic violence, sexual abuse, substance addiction, suicide, and parental neglect.

Language

With the acquisition of English, native language loss is the primary threat to their cultural survival, while neither language is being mastered.

Art

Artisan skills evolved and Kivallirmiut, such as Jessie Oonark, are notable for their figurines of animal life. Another Inuit art medium associated with religious beliefs, also considered a game, involves string figures (ajaraaq/ajaqaat [plural]).

Population

About 3,000 Kivallirmiut exist today, located in Chesterfield Inlet, Rankin Inlet, Whale Cove, Arviat, and Baker Lake.

== Bibliography ==
=== References ===
- Arima, E.Y. (1975). A contextual study of the Caribou Eskimo Kayak. Ottawa: National Museum of Man, Mercury Series 25. OCLC 1918154.
- Bone, Robert M. (2013). The Regional Geography of Canada. Oxford University Press. ISBN 978-0-19-900242-9. - Total pages: 510
