= Ruth Qaulluaryuk =

Canadian Inuk textile artist (1932–2024)

- Spouse: Josiah Nuilaalik

Ruth Qaulluaryuk (1932–2024) was a Canadian Inuk textile artist, also known for her drawings.

== Life and career ==
Qaulluaryuk was born in 1932, and was a native of the Back River area of the Kivalliq Region of Nunavut, formerly the Keewatin Region of the Northwest Territories. She was the daughter of graphic artist Luke Anguhadluq and the spouse of artist Josiah Nuilaalik.

Like many Inuit, she lived a nomadic existence until the 1950s when a shortage of food led to a starvation crisis. As a result, she and her family moved to the settlement of Baker Lake in the early 1970s to find stability and to enable her children to go to school. They were among the last families to make the move.

To contribute to the family income, Qaulluaryuk began to sew clothing and craft items to sell to the government arts and crafts program. She has no formal training as an artist. In 1974, two of her wall hangings appeared in the "Crafts from Arctic Canada" exhibition sponsored by the Canadian Eskimo Arts Council. That same year her drawing Tundra with River was selected for the fourth Baker Lake Annual Print Collection. Hundreds and Hundreds, Herds of Caribou was printed in the following year's collection, and her reputation was established.

She continued to contribute work to exhibits in Canada and the United States, and her work is in the collections of the National Gallery of Canada, the Canadian Museum of History, the National Museum of the American Indian, the Macdonald Stewart Art Centre (Art Gallery of Guelph), the Winnipeg Art Gallery, the Prince of Wales Northern Heritage Centre, and the Simon Fraser Gallery at Simon Fraser University. Qaulluaryuk was the daughter of artist Luke Anguhadluq and the wife of artist Josiah Nuilaalik, son of artist Jessie Oonark with whom she had seven children.

Qaulluaryuk died in 2024. Her work was included in the Winnipeg Art Gallery's inaugural exhibition, INUA, at the Gallery's new Inuit art centre, Qaumajuq in 2021.
