= Utkuhiksalingmiut =

Group of Inuit in Nunavut, Canada

The Utkuhiksalingmiut Ukukhalingmiut, Utkukhalingmiut —the people of the place where there is soapstone—is one of 48 groups of Inuit in what is now Nunavut, Canada.

Their traditional land was around Chantrey Inlet (Tariunnuaq) area, near the estuary of the Back River in, what was then called, the Keewatin District of the Northwest Territories.

The Utkuhiksalingmiut followed the traditional hunter-nomadic life moving from fishing the camp near the mouth of the Back River on Chantrey Inlet to their caribou hunting camp in the Garry Lake area, living in winter snow houses (igloos) and caribou skin tents in the summer. They subsisted mainly on trout (lake trout and Arctic char), whitefish, and barren-ground caribou.

== Early documentation ==
In his 1888 Sixth Annual Report of the Bureau of Ethnology to the Smithsonian Institution, which was based on his trip to Cumberland Sound and Davis Strait and on "extracts from the reports of other travelers", the anthropologist Franz Boas listed three Inuit groups—the Netchillirmiut, Ugjulirmiut, and Ukusiksalirmiut as the Boothia Felix and Back River Inuit, calling them tribes of the "Central Eskimo", terms that are no longer in use. (Note: Boas identified the Baffin Land Inuit groups as Sikosuilarmiut, Akuliarmiut, Qaumauangmiut, Nugumiut, Oqomiut, Padlimiut, Akudnirmiut, Aggomiut, Iglulirmiut, Pilingmiut, and Sagdlirmiut. He identified the Inuit groups on the western shore of Hudson Bay as Aivillirmiut, and Kinipetu or Agutit, the Sagdlirmiut of Southampton Island, Sinimiut; the Inuit groups of Boothia Felix and Back River were identified as the Netchillirmiut, Ugjulirmiut, and Ukusiksalirmiut; the Inuit groups of Smith Sound were identified as Ellesmere Land and the North Greenlanders. The current names of the 48 groups of Nunavutmiut can be found on the map on page 340 of the 2008 publication, Uqalurait.)

The 2008 publication Uqalurait, an "authoritative and comprehensive compilation of the traditional knowledge of Inuit elders", lists the 48 Nunavutmiut groups and uses the spelling Utkuhiksalingmiut.

== First contact ==
During his Fifth Thule Expedition, the Danish explorer, Knud Rasmussen, visited a Utkuhikhalingmiut camp. This represented the first time the Utkuhikhalingmiut made contact with non-Inuit. Rasmussen, whose mother was Inuk, traversed the Arctic region from Hudson Bay to the Bering Strait in dogsled from 1921 to 1924.

In the 1980s, CBC radio aired a segment in which Jessie Oonark, OC RCA (March 2, 1906 – March 7, 1985)—a prolific and influential artist—described that encounter in the Utkuhiksalik language, which Oonark spoke fluently. Oonark was one of three Inuit artists—along with Marion Tuu'luq (1910–2002) and Luke Anguhadluq (1895–1982)—the Utkuhikhalingmiut camp leader—whose artworks reflect Utkuhiksalingmiut oral history and legends.

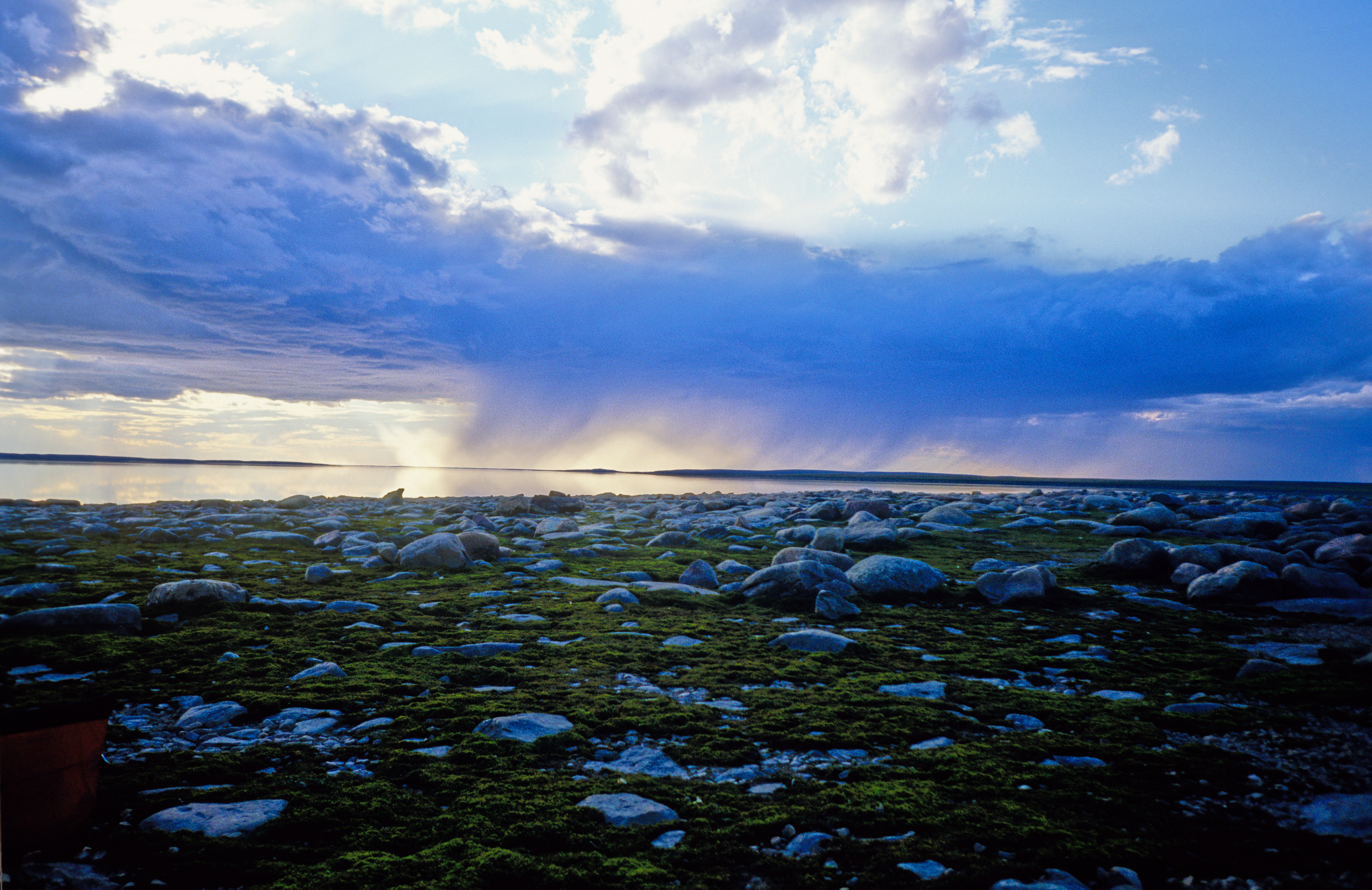
Garry Lake 2006

== Mission period ==
By 1949, Roman Catholic mission post had been established in an island in Garry Lake Hanningajuq, an outflow of the Back River.

== Garry Lake famine ==
In the late 1950s, there was a shift in the migratory patterns of the Beverly herd of the barren-ground caribou upon which the Utkuhikhalingmiut depended, causing a famine. During the winter months of 1957–1958, of the Utkuhikhalingmiut at Garry Lake—the Hanningajurmiut—58 people died before the federal government intervened. The Canadian armed forces airlifted 31 survivors to Baker Lake.

Most never returned to Garry Lake on a permanent basis. During a brief visit to the area in 2009 by one of survivors of the Garry Lake starvation, a bag and some small items that were still fresh, were found in the old Catholic mission that had been manned by Father Joseph Buliard. In Baker Lake, the Utkuhikhalingmiut were forced to change their nomadic lifestyle. They became a small minority in the hamlet where they were known as the Back River people.

== Language ==
In 2015, Nunavut Arctic College published Jean Briggs's 700-page dictionary of the rare Utkuhiksalingmiut dialect, a multi-year, collaborative process. Rosie Kigeak, who became Briggs' mentor in the early 1960s when she came to live with a family camp to understand to the Utkuhiksalingmiut culture, became Brigg's "most trusted collaborator on the dictionary".

== Notable people ==
- William Noah
- Luke Anguhadluq
- Jessie Oonark
- Marion Tuu'luq
