= Netsilik =

Inuit in Nunavut, Canada

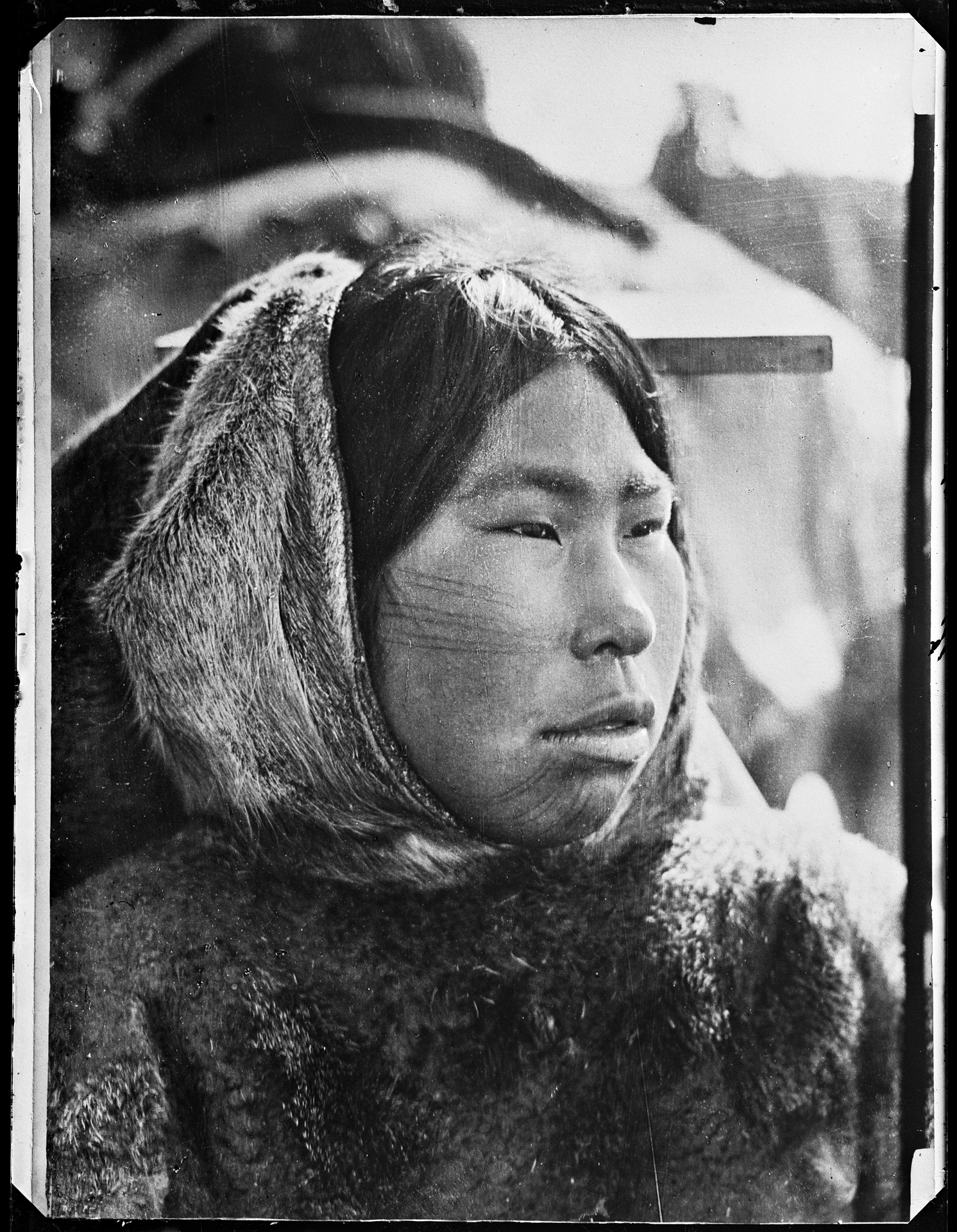
Kabloka, a Netsilik girl in 1903-05

The Netsilik (Netsilingmiut) are Inuit who live predominantly in Kugaaruk and Gjoa Haven, and somewhat in Taloyoak of the Kitikmeot Region, Nunavut, and, to a smaller extent in the north Qikiqtaaluk Region, in Canada. They were, in the early 20th century, among the last northern indigenous peoples to encounter missionaries from the south.

== Language ==
The missionaries introduced a system of written language called Inuktitut syllabics (Qaniujaaqpait), based on syllabics, to the Netsilik in the 1920s. Eastern Canadian Inuit, among them the Netsilik, were the only Inuit to adopt a syllabic system of writing. The Netsilik's spoken language is Natsilingmiutut. It is a dialect of Inuvialuktun and the only one written in syllabics. The Utkuhiksalingmiut, a Kivallirmiut (Caribou Inuit) group speak a variant of it, Utkuhiksalik.

== Hunting and fishing ==
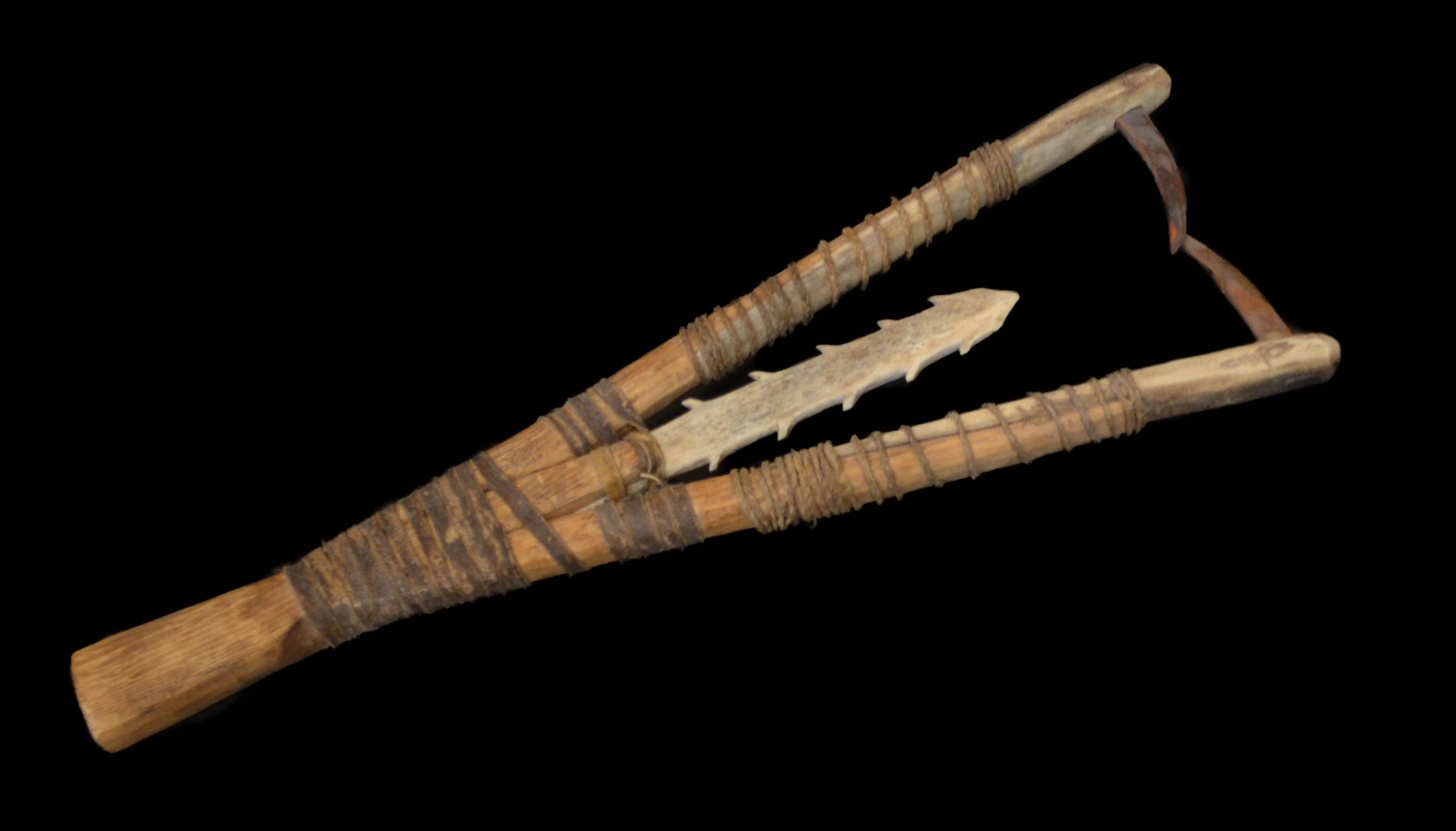
the head of a Kakivak used for fishing

The harsh Arctic environment that the Netsilik inhabited yielded little plant life, so they had to rely on hunting to acquire most of the resources they needed to survive. In the summer months, the Netsilik would hunt caribou on the tundra. The caribou provided food as well as the hides most commonly used for clothing, although polar bear skins were also used when caribou skin was unavailable. Caribou antlers were also extremely important, and the Netsilik made many implements from caribou antlers, including the breathing hole probe that was integral for seal hunting. In the winter months the Netsilik would migrate out onto the sea ice where they would fish and hunt seal. The Netsilik people used fish as another subsistence strategy when seal and caribou were not available. The Netsilik fished for Arctic char using a kakivak to impale fish through a hole in the ice. Any excess fish were stored in ice blocks and saved for a time when fishing and hunting were both unrewarding. Seals also provided the Netsilik with fat for their qulliq (soapstone lamps), which both lit and heated the igloos. This made the Netsilik, and most other Inuit, one of the few peoples to hunt for their heating fuel, rather than use wood.

== Culture ==
By 1923, the Netsilik were in possession of firearms, and iron and steel had also begun to replace flint and bone for arrowheads, harpoons, needles, knives and other tools. This made hunting much easier, and the traditional migration patterns of the Netsilik began to change. From the 1930s to the 1960s, Christian missionaries and the Canadian government became more involved in the lives of the Netsilik, who began trading Arctic fox pelts in order to generate income to purchase imported goods. The process of acculturation accelerated in the 1960s, with more and more Netsilik converting to Christianity, moving into permanent settlements built from imported materials, taking up wage labour and using government services. Today, the Netsilik essentially do not practice traditional forms of subsistence, although some elders continue to make traditional artifacts such as kayaks and stone tools and trinkets for museums and for sale.

The Netsilik people were the subject of a 1970s U.S. educational project, Man: A Course of Study, which attracted criticism from American conservative groups.

In 1988 excerpts from Knud Rasmussen's Journals of the Fifth Thule Expedition were used by Canadian / American composer Raymond Luedeke to create an orchestral work with narration, Tales of the Netilik. This work was commissioned by six Canadian orchestras and played throughout Canada.

In the 1920s, Knud Rasmussen, and later in the 1930s, Gontran de Poncins reported that senicide was still practised by the Netsilik of King William's Land.

== Female Infanticide ==
Infanticide is a historical practice that has been seen across multiple different Inuit groups. Female infanticide has been well documented practice in Netsilik culture. There have been many proposed theories about why this may be the case. Based on his overall work surrounding the Netsilik, Wyer (Wyer 1932) determined the reason is that children are not as productive members of society as adults are and thus few must be sacrificed to save those who can provide. Hoebel (Hoebel 1961) proposed a broader idea that it is due to food scarcity in the region and was a method of solving a population problem. Balikci (Balikci 1967) proposes the idea that the reason behind the focus of female infanticides was due to males having a higher mortality rate at that time and that their reasons and practices are highly flexible and adaptable. Riches (Riches v1974) continues to structure his ideas off of those like Balikci but ties in other Netsilik cultural practices such as endogamy and wife stealing. The general consensus as to why this practice took place includes ideas around surviving a harsh environment, cultural values, and population control (Freeman 1971).
