= Flat top =

A flattop is a type of very short hairstyle.

Flat top, Flattop, or Flat Top may also refer to:

== Places ==
- Flat Top (Ross Dependency), the tallest peak in the Commonwealth Range in Antarctica, rising to 4,000 metres (13,123 ft)
- Flat Top (Coats Land), table mountain in Coats Land, Antarctica
- Flat Top (Georgia), a mountain in Rabun County, Georgia, U.S.
- Flat Top, Jefferson County, Alabama
- Flat Top, Virginia
- Flat Top, West Virginia, an unincorporated community in Mercer County, West Virginia, United States
- Flat Top Island, Tasmania
- Flat Top Island, Queensland
- Flat Top Manor, manor near Blowing Rock, North Carolina
- Flattop Island, in the San Juan Islands of the U.S. state of Washington.
- Flattop Island (Nunavut), Canada
- Flattop Mountain, name shared by many mountains and buttes in the United States

== Other uses ==
- A term for an Aircraft carrier.
- Flat Top (film), a 1952 film starring Sterling Hayden as an aircraft carrier commander
- Flat Top (song), a song by the Goo Goo Dolls
- Flat-Top (comics), a fictional character published by Harvey Comics
- Flat top guitar, a type of guitar body model
- Flattop (Dick Tracy villain), full name Flattop Jones
- Flattop (Transformers), a member of the Micromasters
- Flattop, another name for an aircraft carrier
- Flattop grill, a cooking appliance
- A name for a jointer woodworking tool
- Flattop (critical assembly), an experiment at Los Alamos National Laboratory
- A term used for table mountains or mesas
- A term used to describe vintage cars rooftop lines (e.g. Cadillac de Ville series)
