= Pistol Bay =

Bay in Nunavut, Canada

- Location within Nunavut
- Location: Hudson Bay
- Coordinates: 62°25′00″N 92°40′30″W
- Ocean/sea sources: Arctic Ocean
- Basin countries: Canada
- Settlements: Uninhabited

Pistol Bay is a waterway in the Kivalliq Region, Nunavut, Canada. It is located in northwestern Hudson Bay between Igloo Point (30 km (19 mi) east) and Term Point (30 km (19 mi) south southeast).

The Pork Peninsula separates the bay and Corbett Inlet.

The community of Whale Cove lies 28 km (17 mi) south.

== History ==
In 1815, Robert Kerr wrote that it was considered at one point as a possible gateway to the Northwest Passage.

== Climate ==
Climate data is from Whale Cove, 28 km (17 mi) south.

The area features a cold tundra climate (“ET”), a polar climate sub-type under the Köppen climate classification; unlike most of the Kivalliq Region (most of which is usually a subarctic climate); with cold winters averaging around −23 °C (−9 °F), and cool, very wet and rainy summers averaging around 6.8 °C (44.2 °F); but temperatures of 25 °C (77 °F) or above are possible. Winters run from October/November until April/May with temperatures averaging between −14.6 and −30.6 °C (5.7 and −23.1 °F). Summers run from June to September, and average temperatures range from 3.5 to 9.8 °C (38.3 to 49.6 °F). Summers are usually cool, wet, and rainy, but can be warm, with a record high of 29.0 °C (84.2 °F). Summers typically last four months.

Climate data for Whale Cove (Whale Cove Airport) Climate ID: 2303986 coordinates 62°14′24″N 92°35′53″W; elevation: 12.2 m (40 ft); 1991–2020 normals, extremes 1985–present
Month	Jan	Feb	Mar	Apr	May	Jun	Jul	Aug	Sep	Oct	Nov	Dec	Year
Record high humidex	−5.9	−6.3	1.8	2.4	14.4	23.3	28.4	27.5	21.5	7.1	1.8	0.0	28.4
Record high °C (°F)	−2.0 (28.4)	−4.0 (24.8)	2.0 (35.6)	10.0 (50.0)	10.5 (50.9)	24.0 (75.2)	26.0 (78.8)	29.0 (84.2)	20.0 (68.0)	21.0 (69.8)	10.0 (50.0)	0.0 (32.0)	29.0 (84.2)
Mean daily maximum °C (°F)	−26.0 (−14.8)	−25.5 (−13.9)	−19.4 (−2.9)	−10.0 (14.0)	−2.0 (28.4)	7.1 (44.8)	13.8 (56.8)	12.9 (55.2)	6.6 (43.9)	−0.8 (30.6)	−11.7 (10.9)	−19.8 (−3.6)	−6.2 (20.8)
Daily mean °C (°F)	−29.6 (−21.3)	−29.1 (−20.4)	−23.8 (−10.8)	−14.5 (5.9)	−5.1 (22.8)	3.9 (39.0)	10.0 (50.0)	10.1 (50.2)	4.6 (40.3)	−3.0 (26.6)	−15.3 (4.5)	−23.5 (−10.3)	−9.6 (14.7)
Mean daily minimum °C (°F)	−33.2 (−27.8)	−32.7 (−26.9)	−28.2 (−18.8)	−18.8 (−1.8)	−8.3 (17.1)	0.7 (33.3)	6.2 (43.2)	7.2 (45.0)	2.5 (36.5)	−5.2 (22.6)	−19.0 (−2.2)	−27.3 (−17.1)	−13.0 (8.6)
Record low °C (°F)	−44.0 (−47.2)	−47.5 (−53.5)	−43.0 (−45.4)	−36.0 (−32.8)	−25.5 (−13.9)	−9.5 (14.9)	−3.0 (26.6)	−1.0 (30.2)	−8.0 (17.6)	−24.5 (−12.1)	−34.0 (−29.2)	−43.5 (−46.3)	−47.5 (−53.5)
Record low wind chill	−63.8	−68.9	−61.1	−48.4	−34.7	−16.0	0.0	0.0	−16.9	−39.6	−53.6	−59.3	−68.9
Average precipitation mm (inches)	14.9 (0.59)	9.9 (0.39)	13.2 (0.52)	14.6 (0.57)	15.5 (0.61)	24.1 (0.95)	38.7 (1.52)	59.6 (2.35)	51.6 (2.03)	29.5 (1.16)	19.9 (0.78)	14.7 (0.58)	306.3 (12.06)
Average rainfall mm (inches)	0.0 (0.0)	0.0 (0.0)	0.0 (0.0)	0.4 (0.02)	4.6 (0.18)	21.8 (0.86)	38.7 (1.52)	59.6 (2.35)	46.7 (1.84)	11.0 (0.43)	0.1 (0.00)	0.0 (0.0)	182.9 (7.20)
Average snowfall cm (inches)	15.9 (6.3)	10.0 (3.9)	14.0 (5.5)	14.5 (5.7)	10.9 (4.3)	2.4 (0.9)	0.0 (0.0)	0.0 (0.0)	4.9 (1.9)	19.4 (7.6)	20.8 (8.2)	16.5 (6.5)	129.4 (50.9)
Average precipitation days (≥ 0.2 mm)	9.8	6.7	7.9	6.7	6.7	7.6	10.4	14.0	14.0	13.3	10.8	7.7	115.5
Average rainy days (≥ 0.2 mm)	0.0	0.0	0.0	0.30	1.7	7.1	10.4	14.0	12.0	4.3	0.23	0.0	50.0
Average snowy days (≥ 0.2 cm)	9.7	6.8	7.9	6.5	5.4	0.95	0.0	0.0	2.7	10.0	10.7	8.0	68.5
Source: Environment and Climate Change Canada (humidex and wind chill 1981-2010)
