= Thomas Simpson (explorer) =

Scottish explorer (1808–1840)

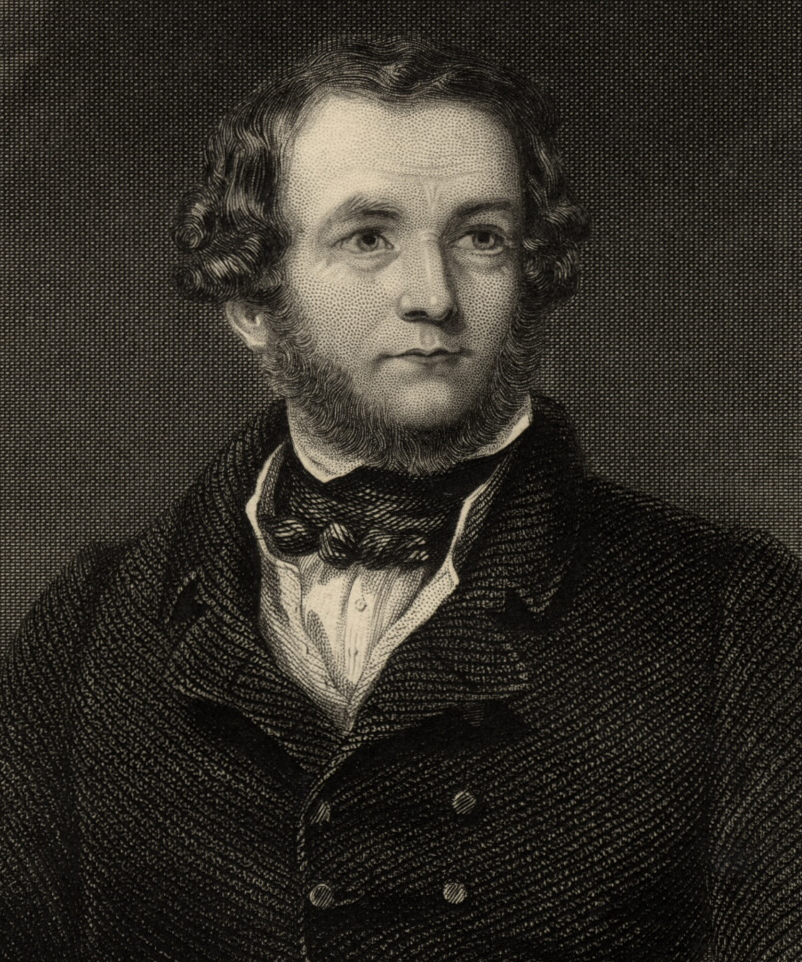
- Born: 2 July 1808; Dingwall, Ross-shire, Scotland
- Died: 14 June 1840 (aged 31); Turtle River, Territory of Iowa
- Education: King's College, Aberdeen
- Occupations: Arctic explorer, fur trader
- Years active: 1829–1840
- Employer: Hudson's Bay Company
- Relatives: Sir George Simpson (cousin)
- Awards: Founder's Medal (1839)

Thomas Simpson (2 July 1808 – 14 June 1840) was a Scottish Arctic explorer, fur trader and cousin of Governor Sir George Simpson of the Hudson's Bay Company (HBC). He is known for helping chart the northern coasts of Canada as well as his mysterious death by violence while traveling near the Turtle River in what was then part of the Territory of Iowa (now the U.S. state of North Dakota). The circumstances of Simpson's final hours—in which he allegedly killed himself after gunning down two companions—have long been a subject of controversy.

== Early life ==
Thomas Simpson was born in Dingwall, Ross-shire, Scotland, the son of magistrate and schoolteacher Alexander Simpson (1751–1821) by his second wife Mary, who had helped raise Thomas' cousin Sir George Simpson. He had a half-brother, Aemilius, and a full brother, Alexander. Simpson was a sickly and timid youth, avoiding rough sport. After his father's death the family ended up in financial distress, but despite this he was given a proper education.

Simpson was educated with a view to his becoming a clergyman, and was sent to King's College, Aberdeen, at the age of 17. He performed quite well and had been given the Huttonian prize, the highest award at the college, by the end of his fourth year. George Simpson offered Thomas a position in the Hudson's Bay Company (HBC) in 1826, which he declined in order to complete his studies.

Simpson graduated in 1828, at the age of 20, with a Master of Arts degree. He enrolled in a divinity class that winter with the goal of becoming a clergyman when the offer of a position in the HBC was again extended; this time he accepted. By his own confession, Simpson had "a little of the spirit of contradiction and an unwillingness to be led." In 1829 he arrived in Norway House to join the HBC as George's secretary. He was quite ambitious, and in a letter to his brother stated that his talents would lead him to speedy advancement. Simpson was stationed at the Red River Colony in the 1830s, serving as second officer to chief factor Alexander Christie.

== Arctic exploration ==
From 1836 to 1839, Simpson was involved in an expedition to chart the Arctic coast of Canada in order to fill two gaps left by other expeditions in search of the Northwest Passage. The expedition was headed by Peter Warren Dease, a chief factor of the HBC. Simpson was the junior officer, but Dease ceded most of the responsibility to him. Several writers present Simpson as an ambitious and over-confident young man, whereas Dease was twenty years older, experienced in Arctic exploration and efficient but perhaps under-confident. Simpson and Dease were accompanied by ten more men, including canoemen James McKay and George Sinclair.

The expedition was organized by the HBC rather than the British Royal Navy, which sponsored most expeditions pressing the Northwest Passage. They were to descend the Mackenzie River to the Arctic Ocean, turn west and close the gap between John Franklin's 1826 furthest-west and Frederick William Beechey's furthest-east at Point Barrow. The next summer they were to go down the Coppermine River, repeat Franklin's 1821 route east to Cape Turnagain and continue along the unknown coast at least to the mouth of the Back River, which had been reached overland in 1834. They spent the winter of 1836 at Fort Chipewyan, where they built two 24-foot (7.3 m) boats.

The party left on 1 June, and a month later reached the mouth of the Great Bear River. There they detached four men to go upriver to the Great Bear Lake and build winter quarters at Fort Confidence while the rest went down the Mackenzie to the Arctic, which they reached on 9 July. They then traveled west along the coast past Franklin's Return Reef until they were blocked by ice at Boat Extreme, about 50 miles (80 km) east of Point Barrow. Simpson and five men continued on foot and reached Point Barrow on 4 August. They returned to Fort Confidence on 25 September. At this point the north coast had been mapped from the Bering Strait to the mouth of the Coppermine.

Early in the year, Simpson went overland to find the upper Coppermine River. In the summer they descended the Coppermine, which was full of meltwater, and reached the still-frozen Arctic. They waited two weeks for the ice to clear and began working slowly east. On 20 August they were blocked by ice a few miles from Franklin's Point Turnagain on the Kent Peninsula. Dease stayed behind with the boats and Simpson walked about 100 miles (160 km) east to a place he called Point Alexander. (Note: "Peter Warren Dease", Dictionary of Canadian Biography Online gives 100 miles (160 km) of coast but the Kent Peninsula is not quite that long and the coast is not much indented.) (Note: Hayes gives his turning point as the Beaufort River two days beyond Cape Alexander, but what is now called the Beaufort River is 10 miles (16 km) west of Cape Alexander.) To the north he saw and named Victoria Land. To the east he saw open water in Queen Maud Gulf. He returned to Dease and the frozen-in boats. A few days later the ice suddenly cleared and they had an easy sail back to the Coppermine. They had gone only a little further than Franklin.

It was a better year for ice. The party followed the same route, passed Point Turnagain and Cape Alexander, sailed for the first time the Dease Strait and the Queen Maud Gulf, found the Adelaide Peninsula and Simpson Strait to its north and reached Chantrey Inlet, where McKay and Sinclair had been in 1834. At Montreal Island they found a cache left by George Back in 1834. Leaving Chantrey Inlet they were struck by a gale that lasted four days. Fifty miles northeast they turned back at the Castor and Pollux River. Returning, they followed the south shore of King William Island to a point they called Cape Herschel, where the coast turned north, then followed the south shore of Queen Maud Gulf and the south shore of Victoria Island. It had been the longest boat voyage ever made in Canadian Arctic waters.

At this point the entire Arctic coast had been roughly mapped from the Bering Strait to beyond Chantrey Inlet. The remaining problems were the possibility of a water route from Chantrey Inlet to the Gulf of Boothia and the huge rectangular area north of the coast and south of the Parry Channel. The party returned to the Great Slave Lake in September of that year, and from there Simpson drew up a letter to the directors of the HBC describing the results of the expedition, which was published in many newspapers of the day. He also transmitted a plan for an expedition to complete further exploration of the coast between the Fury and Hecla Strait and the eastern limits of his previous explorations.

To attend to preparations for this new expedition, Simpson immediately left for the Red River Colony, making the entire 1,910-mile (3,070 km) journey in sixty-one days, arriving on 2 February 1840. The annual canoes from Canada to the settlement in June of that year brought no word of the reception of his exploits, or authorization to continue exploration, as word had not reached England in time to reply at that opportunity. Without authorization from the directors, Simpson had no authority to arrange another expedition. Instead of waiting for an entire year for word, he decided to return to Britain in person.

== Death and investigation ==
Simpson left the Red River Colony on 6 June 1840, intending to travel south to the Minnesota River, in the United States, where he would embark on a voyage that would eventually take him to England. He initially set out with a group of settlers and Métis but soon left the main party with four Métis traveling companions—Antoine Legros Sr, Antoine Legros Jr, John Bird and James Bruce—in order to make better time.

On 14 June 1840, Simpson, Bird and Legros Sr were fatally shot at a wilderness camp near the Turtle River in the Territory of Iowa (now the U.S. state of North Dakota). According to Bruce and Legros Jr, Simpson had become increasingly anxious and even deranged during the trip, finally accusing Bird and the elder Legros of plotting to kill him. He shot them, and the witnesses fled, returning to the larger party, a portion of which then went to Simpson's encampment. They found Simpson dead of gunshot wounds, his shotgun beside him.

Witness depositions agreed that Simpson shot Bird dead and mortally wounded Legros Sr. Bruce and Legros Jr then fled to the main party. When the posse reached the site, they found Legros Sr dead but Simpson still alive. Five minutes later Simpson was dead. All involved said that the wound was self-inflicted. The investigation that was conducted by U.S. territorial authorities was based on witness depositions submitted in various locations. The authorities ruled the deaths a case of murder–suicide.

Bruce's deposition claimed that Simpson told him he killed the two men because they intended to "murder him on that night for his papers." Those papers were later sent to his cousin, Sir George Simpson. Three years later, when Sir George sent the papers to Simpson's younger brother Alexander, the diary and all correspondence between Sir George and Thomas were missing. What the missing papers may have contained remains unknown.

In the meantime, after Simpson's death, the HBC's directors in London had sent permission for him to continue with his explorations. He had also been awarded the Royal Geographical Society's Founder's Medal, and the British government had announced its intention of granting him a pension of £100 a year. Instead, being accused of murder and suicide, and being disgraced in the eyes of the church, Simpson was buried in an unmarked grave in Canada.

=== Continuing controversy ===
In 1845, Alexander published The Life and Times of Thomas Simpson, in which he examined the possibility that Simpson's travelling companions had planned to steal his notes and maps, which they could have sold to the HBC's American rivals, and that Simpson was a victim of homicide.

A number of scholars have studied the evidence in Simpson's death without reaching a conclusion. The three main competing views of the case have been: the official finding, that a deranged Simpson murdered two of his companions and then killed himself; the conspiracy theory, that Simpson's companions murdered him, perhaps for his papers, and then covered up the crime; and the shootout theory, that Simpson attacked his companions, killing two, but was then shot by the others, who invented the suicide story because they feared Simpson's prominence might lead to charges against them.

Famed explorer and historian Vilhjalmur Stefansson included the Simpson case in his 1938 book Unsolved Mysteries of the Arctic. He found the official story, based on witnesses' depositions, to be unconvincing though not impossible. Stefansson and other historians have noted that the official investigation was far from thorough, perhaps because of the remote location of the deaths.

== See also ==
- List of unsolved deaths
