= Hayes River (disambiguation) =

Hayes River may refer to:

- Hayes River (British Columbia)
- Hayes River, in Manitoba
- Hayes River (Nunavut)
