= Pork Peninsula =

Peninsula in Nunavut, Canada

Coordinates: 62.400°N 92.333°W

The Pork Peninsula is a cape located in Kivalliq Region, Nunavut, Canada. It is located on Hudson Bay, 30.1 km (18.7 mi) from the Inuit hamlet of Whale Cove, and 43.5 km (27.0 mi) from Rankin Inlet. The peninsula separates Corbett Inlet and Pistol Bay. Igloo Point is the eastern extremity of the peninsula.

== History ==
The spit of land was named by the residents of Rankin Inlet, commemorating an experimental chicken and pig farm established there by the Canadian government.
