= Naomi Ityi =

Inuk artist (1928–2003)

- Born: 1928; Garry Lake area of the Nunavut
- Died: 2003 (aged 74–75)

Naomi Ityi (1928–2003) was a Canadian Inuk artist. Ityi was born in the Garry Lake area of the Nunavut. She is known for her collaged wall hangings made from wool scraps. Her sister Martha Qarliksaq is also an artist.

Her work is included in the collections of the National Gallery of Canada, the Museum of Fine Arts, Boston, the Museum of Anthropology at the University of British Columbia, and the Winnipeg Art Gallery. Ityi died in 2003.
