= Peter Warren Dease =

Fur trader and arctic explorer (1788-1863)

- Born: 1 January 1788; Fort Mackinac
- Died: 17 January 1863 (aged 75); Montreal, Province of Canada, British North America
- Occupations: Fur trader, arctic explorer
- Employer(s): XY Company, North West Company, Hudson's Bay Company
- Spouse: Elizabeth Chouinard
- Relatives: Peter Warren (great-uncle); Sir William Johnson (great-uncle); Sir John Johnson (cousin)

Peter Warren Dease (1 January 1788 – 17 January 1863) was a Canadian fur trader and Arctic explorer.

== Biography ==
=== Early life ===
Peter Warren Dease was born at Fort Mackinac on 1 January 1788, the fourth son of Dr. John Dease, an Irish loyalist and the captain and a deputy agent in the British Indian Department, and Jane French, who may have been a Mohawk from Caughnawaga. His father was a nephew of Sir William Johnson, and first cousin of Sir John Johnson. He was named after Admiral Sir Peter Warren, an uncle of Sir William Johnson. He was raised by his family in Mackinac Island and then Montreal, until he left home at the age of 13 to work in the fur trade.

=== Fur trade ===
Dease first worked for the XY Company at Great Slave Lake. After that company's amalgamation with the North West Company in 1804, he was appointed to the position of clerk at Athabasca. In 1817 he was moved to the Mackenzie District, first at Fort Good Hope, then later at Fort Chipewyan and other Mackenzie posts. In 1821, the North West and Hudson's Bay Companies were united, and he became a chief trader for the Hudson's Bay Company, working in the Athabasca district.

Dease was asked by George Simpson to mount an expedition to explore the Finlay River basin in 1823, with the goal of developing the fur trade in that region, however Dease was unable to undertake the expedition that year, and the task was reassigned to Samuel Black. However in 1825 he was given the opportunity to participate in Sir John Franklin's third expedition to the Arctic, the Mackenzie River expedition.

After his return from the Franklin expedition, Dease took charge of Fort Good Hope, and was stationed there from 1827 to 1829. In 1828 he was appointed a Chief Factor in the Hudson's Bay Company, as well as member of the Council. He was charged with developing trade along the newly discovered Peel's River. He recommended a post be established near the source of the river, however it was another decade before the post, Peel's Post, was built. In 1829 Dease handed over Fort Good Hope to John Bell, and was stationed briefly at Fort Simpson. He spent the winter of that year at the newly-constructed Fort Halkett, serving in an advisory capacity.

In 1830 he was appointed to Fraser Lake to succeed William Conolly in the New Caledonia district. In 1835 Dease requested a leave of absence due to ill health, probably failing eyesight. The leave was granted, after which he was placed in charge of a new Arctic expedition.

=== Arctic exploration ===
In 1825 Dease was placed in charge of the commissariat in Sir John Franklin's second expedition to the Arctic, having been personally requested by Franklin, who had met him on his first arctic expedition. Dease provided information about the local natives, and arranged for them to supply the expedition. He also supervised the construction of Fort Franklin at Great Bear Lake.

From 1836 to 1839 he was placed in charge of a 12 man expedition to explore the Arctic coast of North America, from the mouth of the Mackenzie River to Point Barrow, filling in information gaps left by other expeditions in search of the Northwest Passage. The expedition left on 1 June 1837, and arrived at Point Barrow on 4 August. They wintered at Fort Confidence on Great Bear Lake and set out eastward in the spring, mapping 100 miles of coastline and naming Victoria Land and Cape Pelly. They again wintered at Fort Confidence, and in the spring of 1839 again explored eastward. On 16 August they reached Montreal Island and discovered a cache of supplies left by George Back.

Dease's junior officer, Thomas Simpson, often complained that he was indolent, and it is Simpson, as opposed to Dease, is generally given credit for the success of the mission. This may be because the only first-hand account of the expedition available until recently was Simpson's posthumously published journals. For his services in connection with this expedition Dease was given a £100 pension by Queen Victoria, and was rumoured to have been offered a knighthood, which he turned down.

The Dease Strait, part of the Northwest Passage, is named after Dease. He was the first to navigate it along with Thomas Simpson.

=== Retirement ===
Following the expedition, Dease was given another leave of absence, from 1840 to 1841, during which time he married (on 3 August 1840) and settled on a farm in Côte Sainte-Catherine, near Montreal. He retired from the Hudson's Bay Company in 1843. He remained at Côte Sainte-Catherine until his death on 17 January 1863. He and his wife, Elizabeth Chouinard, a Métis, had eight children: four sons and four daughters.

== Personal description ==
Dease was described in George Simpson's Character Book (compiled in 1832), as being:

About 45 years of Age. Very steady in business, an excellent Indian trader, speaks several of the Languages well and is a man of very correct conduct and character. Strong, vigorous and capable of going through a great deal of Severe Service but rather indolent, wanting in ambition to distinguish himself in any measure out of the usual course, inactive until aroused to exertion and over easy and indulgent to his people which frequently occasions laxity of discipline, but when his temper gets ruffled he becomes furiously violent. His judgement [sic] is sound, his manners are more pleasing and easy than those of many of his colleagues, and altho' not calculated to make a shining figure, may be considered a very respectable member of the concern.

Dease was a well-liked man by many people, among them being Captain Franklin and Letitia Hargrave, the wife of James Hargrave of York Factory. Dease’s previous expedition experience greatly impressed Franklin, as he was knowledgeable of the Indians and the country Franklin intended to travel through.

Letitia was known to be very critical of the people she met. However, of Dease, she wrote: "I like him much better than any of them, he looks like a gentleman & is pleasing in every respect." In a letter addressed to James Hargrave, one Charles Ross had only kind words for Dease: "… I found a most amiable warm hearted, sociable man — quite free from that haughtiness & reserve, which often characterises [sic] those who have little else to recommend them — and if Fortune always favors the Good, he should enjoy an unusual share of her smiles."

Most notably, the men who accompanied him on the expedition thought very highly of him. He tried to encourage his companions by playing the violin and flute, as well as hosting entertaining dinner parties.

Thomas Simpson, however, did not think as highly of Dease as others. He would frequently refer to Dease using demeaning terms in his correspondences, specifically with his brother, Alexander Simpson, and his good friend Donald Ross. He was "more than doubtful" of Dease’s ability to contract a fisherman for the expedition and states so clearly in his letter to Ross in August 1836.

Barr notes that Simpson’s statement is most inaccurate, since Dease successfully operated the New Caledonia District for five years which was known to be a very difficult area to control. It was remote and so maintaining supply lines was strenuous. The area relied on salmon rather than pemmican or caribou, and the occasional fishery failures could prove disastrous. In addition, the reliance on salmon alone would cause health problems.

Simpson even goes on to say that he "cannot help regarding him and his followers as dead weight upon the expedition … showing that ten years' experience well applied may be more valuable than that of a life-time."

In contrast, it is difficult to know what Dease thought of these people who though so highly of him. It was only recently that his expedition journals were discovered and then published by William Barr. Even so, it does not offer very much insight on his opinion.
