= Lake Beechey =

Lake in Nunavut, Canada

- Location within Nunavut

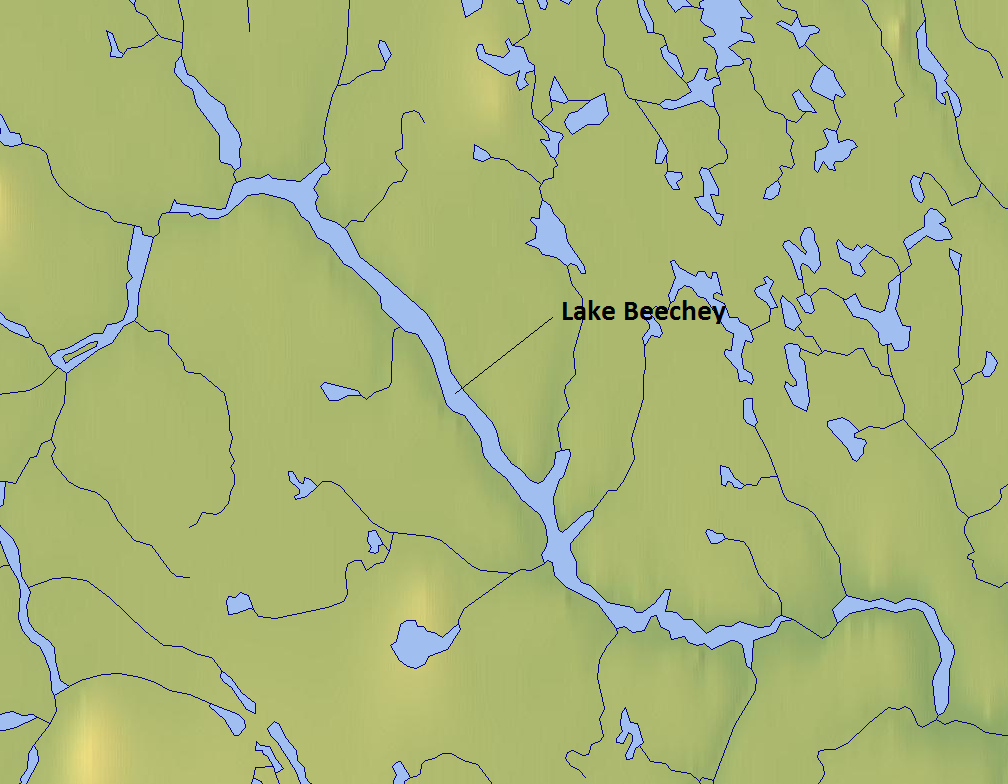
- Location: Kitikmeot Region, Nunavut
- Coordinates: 65°25′00″N 106°50′00″W
- Primary inflows: Back River
- Primary outflows: Back River
- Basin countries: Canada
- Settlements: uninhabited

Lake Beechey (sometimes Beechey Lake) is a lake in the Kitikmeot Region, Nunavut, Canada. It is a long, narrow, lake-expansion of the Back River. It is part of the western Canadian Precambrian Shield. It contains a few unnamed islands.

Historically, Lake Beechey was the southernmost territory of Copper Inuit.

The first European to explore the lake was George Back and named by Sir John Franklin in honour of Frederick William Beechey.
