= Marion Tuu'luq =

Canadian artist (1910-2002)

- Born: 1910; Chantrey Inlet/Back River area of the Northwest Territories (now Nunavut
- Died: 2002 (aged 91–92)
- Known for: Inuk artist
- Spouse: second husband Luke Anguhadluq

Marion Tuu'luq RCA LL.D (1910–2002), also known as Anguhadluq, Tudluq, Tuuluq, and Toodlook, was an Inuk artist in mixed media and textiles. She "drew upon vivid colors, symmetry, and anthropomorphic imagery, to create vibrant tapestries which depict stories, legends, and personal experiences."

== Early life ==
Tuu'luq was born in 1910 in the Chantrey Inlet/Back River area of the Northwest Territories (now Nunavut, north-west of Hudson Bay. In the 1960s, she was part of a semi-nomadic group of Inuit who, facing the threat of starvation, were forced to change their nomadic lifestyle and move to the settlement of Baker Lake. While she was relieved to escape hardship, she expressed sorrow at the loss of her nomadic lifestyle. Her personal history emerges in her work as she attends to the significance of land and family in contemporary Inuit life. Tuu'luq's "A Story of Starvation," as told to Susan Tagoona, shares her experience growing up in the Arctic and her struggle for survival. She was married twice and had 16 children, four of whom outlived her. Her second husband, the celebrated Baker Lake artist Luke Anguhadluq died in 1982.

== Work ==
Tuu'luq used embroidery thread, felt, and dense woollen fabrics. She was a part of a circle of northern fabric artists (including Jessie Oonark and Irene Avaalaaqiaq Tiktaalaaq) who helped establish the contemporary art form of large-scale, two-dimensional, embroidered textile works.

Tuu'luq's works have been displayed nationally and internationally and collected by numerous private collectors and public institutions, including the Art Gallery of Ontario, the Edmonton Art Gallery, Museum London, the Montreal Museum of Fine Arts, the Thunder Bay Art Gallery, Vancouver Art Gallery, Artexte Information Gallery, Canadian Women Artists History Initiative Documentation Centre, University of Manitoba Architecture and Fine Arts Library, the University of Saskatchewan Archives, the Winnipeg Art Gallery as well as the National Gallery of Canada. She was also a member of the Royal Canadian Academy of Arts, and given an honorary Doctor of Laws degree from the University of Alberta.
