= Luke Anguhadluq =

Canadian Inuk artist (1895-1982)

Luke Anguhadluq ᓗᒃ ᐊᖑᐊᓗᖅ
- Born: 1895
- Died: 1982 (aged 86–87)

Luke Anguhadluq (1895–1982; Inuktitut syllabics: ᓗᒃ ᐊᖑᐊᓗᖅ) was a Canadian Inuk artist in Baker Lake.

== Biography ==
Luke Anguhadluq was born at Chantrey Inlet in 1895 to the Utkuhikhalingmiut (meaning "people of the stone for cooking pots") people. Anguhadluq grew up living traditionally off of the land in the Back River area and by the age of 28 was considered to be a mature hunter and eventually a respected camp leader. The Utkuhikhalingmiut remained largely unaffected by settling Europeans and continued their traditions into the 1950s. A famine, resulting from a shift in the migratory patterns of caribou away from Back River, caused Anguhadluq and his extended family to leave the area. Anguhadluq led his family to Schultz Lake and Whitehills Lake before settling in Qamani'tuaq, or Baker Lake, in 1961.

Anguhadluq's family arranged for him to marry his cousin Jessie Oonark, who is also a well-known artist, but the union never took place. Luke Anguhadluq had 3 wives and 7 children, including two sons whom he adopted. One of Anguhadluq's wives, Marion Tuu'luq, was also an artist specializing in wall-hangings and drawings.

Anguhadluq continued to live in an igloo in the winter and a skin tent in the summer until he was 72. The artist hunted and fished almost daily on the lands around Baker Lake. Luke Anguhadluq died on 2 February 1982 at the age of 87 in Baker Lake. As per his wishes, Anguhadluq was not buried in the Anglican cemetery and his body was instead taken by dogsled to a hill overlooking Baker Lake where he spent many hours watching for caribou.

== Artistic career ==
Anguhadluq began his career as an artist when he was 65. It has been suggested that he could have been persuaded by Jessie Oonark's prosperity as an artist to begin exploring his illustrative talents. Anguhadluq took advantage of the crafting materials that were easily accessible in Baker Lake and created drawings, prints and sculptures early in his career. Anguhadluq would often draw sitting on the ground with the paper situated between his stretched-out legs, rotating the page as he went.

Crafts Officers in Baker Lake quickly took notice of Anguhadluq's talent and encouraged him to continue drawing. Some of Anguhadluq's prints were sent in a collection to the Canadian Eskimo Arts Council, which resulted in the creation and development of a printmaking initiative in Baker Lake in 1969. Many of Anguhadluq's drawings were then made into prints, often by his sons, Thomas Iksiraq and Barnabus Oosuaq, who became printmakers. Luke Anguhadluq's prints, 81 in total, were a part of each annual Baker Lake Print Collection until he died. Jack Butler, a Craft Officer from 1969 to 1972 described Anguhadluq as a respected patriarch and his art was respected by the community as a result. For example, printmakers were encouraged to modify the base illustrations for their prints as they saw fit, but Anguhadluq's drawings remained unaltered in admiration of him.

=== Style ===
Anguhadluq's drawings depicted Utkuhikhalingmiut customs and his own lived experiences of these events. Hunting, drum dancing and people in Anguhadluq's community were often his inspirations. After being encouraged by Craft Officers in Baker Lake, Anguhadluq also began to include mythical components in his illustrations. Some modern objects also inspired Anguhadluq in his later artistic career, such as bedsprings. Anguhadluq's style has been described as abbreviated, with simplified images and a prudent use of line. He would also often use multiple perspectives and/or repeat his subjects for graphic effects.

Historian Cynthia Cook has described Anguhadluq's work as having two distinct periods: the early period between 1960–1969 and the later period between 1970–1982. The early illustrations were often done in felt-tip pen and a limited range of coloured pencils. They most often depicted small figures, made of rugged and perturbed lines, surrounded by a vast expanse of blank paper. Later drawings used graphite and coloured pencil on handmade paper to show often larger figures, more balanced on the page than in previous works. Anguhadluq also began to use colour for visual appeal, organization of the subject and to connote symbolic value to the figures in his works. He also began to incorporate multiple perspectives during this period, which centred around a central point or figure in order to illustrate complicated events and to express his own lived experiences of time and space.

=== Exhibitions ===
Anguhadluq's work has been featured in over 94 national and international exhibitions between 1970 and 1996, including 6 exhibitions exclusively showing his works. Two of Anguhadluq's most notable exhibitions include a joint production with his wife, Marion Tuu'luq, in 1976 and a solo exhibition put together by the Art Gallery of Ontario and held at the National Art Gallery of Canada from 1993 to 1995.

=== Collections ===
Works by Luke Anguhadluq are at the Agnes Etherington Art Centre (Kingston, ON), Canadian Guild of Crafts Quebec (Montréal, QC), Canadian Museum of History (Hull, QC), Klamer Family Collection, Art Gallery of Ontario (Toronto, ON), Victoria and Albert Museum (London, UK), Edmonton Art Gallery (Edmonton, AB), the National Gallery of Canada (Ottawa, ON), Musée national des beaux-arts du Québec (Québec, QC) and the Museum of Anthropology, University of British Columbia (Vancouver, BC) among others.

There are works by Luke Anguhadluk at commercial galleries including Feheley Fine Arts in Toronto, ON., and Spirit Wrestler Gallery in Vancouver, BC.

=== Awards ===
Anguhadluq was presented with a cultural award to attend the shared exhibition with his wife, which was held at the Winnipeg Art Gallery. He has also been featured in the magazine Inuit Art Quarterly many times and is regarded as an important Canadian artist. Anguhadluq's work is known to be held in the collections of at least 25 galleries and museums around the world.
