= Irik Island =

Island in Nunavut, Canada

- Location within Nunavut Location within Canada

Geography
- Location: Hudson Bay
- Coordinates: 62°10′N 92°30′W
- Archipelago: Arctic Archipelago

Administration
- Canada
- Nunavut: Nunavut
- Region: Kivalliq

Demographics
- Population: Uninhabited

Irik Island is one of the Canadian arctic islands in Nunavut, Canada within western Hudson Bay. The hamlet of Whale Cove is 4.1 km (2.5 mi) to the west.
