= Whale Cove Airport =

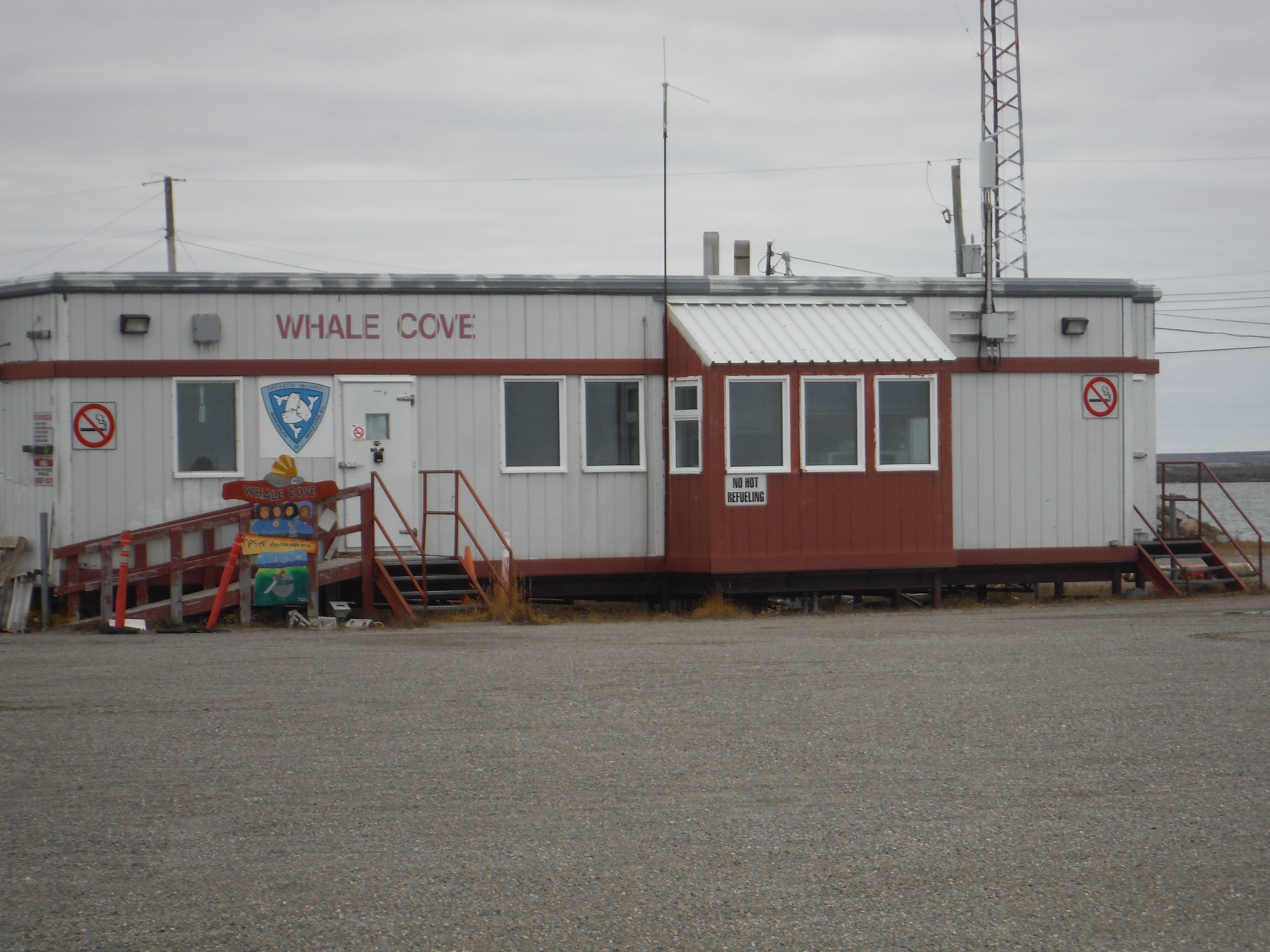
- IATA: YXN; ICAO: CYXN

Summary
- Airport type: Public
- Operator: Government of Nunavut
- Location: Whale Cove, Nunavut
- Time zone: CST (UTC−06:00)
  - Summer (DST): CDT (UTC−05:00)
- Elevation AMSL: 40 ft / 12 m
- Coordinates: 62°14′24″N 092°35′53″W

Map
- Location in Nunavut CYXN (Canada)

Runways
Direction	Length		Surface
Direction	ft	m	Surface
15/33	3,937	1,200	Gravel

Statistics (2010)
- Aircraft movements: 1,481
- Source: Canada Flight Supplement; Movements from Statistics Canada.

Whale Cove Airport (IATA: YXN, ICAO: CYXN) is located 4.3 nautical miles (8.0 km; 4.9 mi) from Whale Cove, Nunavut, Canada, and is operated by the government of Nunavut.

== Airlines and destinations ==
Airlines	Destinations
Calm Air	Rankin Inlet
Nolinor Aviation	Charter: Meadowbank
