= Jean Briggs =

American-born Canadian anthropologist

- Born: May 28, 1929; Washington, D.C., United States
- Died: July 27, 2016 (aged 87)
- Education: Vassar College; Boston University; Harvard University
- Occupations: Anthropologist; ethnographer; linguist; professor

Jean L. Briggs (May 28, 1929 – July 27, 2016) was an American-born anthropologist, ethnographer, linguist, and professor emerita at Memorial University of Newfoundland. Her best known works included the 1970 landmark book Never in Anger: Portrait of an Eskimo Family, based on 18 months of research and field work in Inuit communities on the Arctic coast during the 1960s.

== Biography ==
Briggs was born in Washington, D.C., on May 28, 1929, the eldest of four children of Margaret (née Worcester) and Horace W. Briggs, member of the clergy of The New Church, also known as Swedenborgianism. She was raised in the state of Maine and Newton, Massachusetts. Jean Briggs received her bachelor's degree from Vassar College in 1951. She then completed a master's degree from Boston University in 1960 and her Ph.D. from Harvard University in 1967.

In 1967, Briggs moved to the Canadian province of Newfoundland and Labrador and joined the Department of Anthropology at Memorial University in St. John's, where she taught for 47 years. She was a student of Cora Du Bois, an American cultural and psychiatric anthropologist.

In 1970, she published her best-known book, Never in Anger: Portrait of an Eskimo Family, based on research conducted while living with an Inuit family along the Chantrey Inlet for 18-months during the 1960s. She documents the culture, language and practices of the family and the surrounding community in the book, which remains a landmark publication in the fields of ethnography and anthropology. By her own account, Briggs knew very few Inuit words when she arrived to conduct her research, "When I arrived in Chantrey Inlet in 1963, I knew only six words of Inuktitut: 'yes,' 'no,' ‘I don’t know,’ ‘have some tea,’ 'have some more tea' and 'thank you'."

In 1988, Briggs published a second book, Inuit Morality Play: The Emotional Education of a Three-Year-Old. Her book won two awards, the Boyer Prize from the Society for Psychoanalytic Anthropology and the Victor Turner Prize from the Society for Humanistic Anthropology.

Jean Briggs compiled a landmark, bilingual Utkuhiksalingmiut Inuktitut dictionary, which was published in 2015. Briggs had begun compiling Utkuhiksalingmiut Inuktitut words in 1970, ultimately gathering and preserving 34,000 words in the dictionary. Prior to its 2015 publication, no dictionary had ever documented the Utkuhiksalingmiut Inuktitut dialect. Several researches and colleagues from Memorial University and the University of Toronto joined her to create the dictionary, utilizing five grants from the Social Sciences and Humanities Research Council (SSHRC).

Most of her fieldwork and research focused on the Canadian Inuit, but she also visited communities of Alaskan Inupiat and Siberian Yupik people.

Jean Briggs died from congestive heart failure on July 27, 2016, at the age of 87.

== Honors and awards ==
Briggs won the Lifetime Achievement Award from the Society for Psychological Anthropology, as well as an honorary doctorate from the University of Bergen in Norway. She was also a Royal Society of Canada fellow.
