= Kayak Island (Nunavut) =

Island in Nunavut, Canada

- Location within Nunavut Location within Canada

Geography
- Location: Hudson Bay
- Coordinates: 62°13′N 92°28′W
- Archipelago: Arctic Archipelago

Administration
- Canada
- Nunavut: Nunavut
- Region: Kivalliq

Demographics
- Population: Uninhabited

Kayak Island is one of the Canadian arctic islands in Nunavut, Canada within western Hudson Bay. The hamlet of Whale Cove is 8.1 km (5.0 mi) to the southwest.
