= Hayes River (Nunavut) =

Location
- Country: Canada
- Territory: Nunavut
- Regions: Kitikmeot; Kivalliq

Physical characteristics
- Source: Unnamed lake
  - location: Kivalliq Region
  - coordinates: 66°28′37″N 90°46′08″W
  - elevation: 496 m (1,627 ft)
- Mouth: Back River (Nunavut)
  - location: Kitikmeot Region
  - coordinates: 67°08′00″N 95°17′00″W
  - elevation: 0 m (0 ft)
- Length: 335 km (208 mi)

The Hayes River is a river in the Kitikmeot and Kivalliq Regions of Nunavut, Canada. It is in the Arctic Ocean drainage basin and is a tributary of the Back River.

== Course ==
The river begins at an unnamed lake in Kivalliq Region, and reaches its mouth at the Back River in Kitikmeot Region, just south of that river's mouth at Cockburn Bay on Chantrey Inlet on the Arctic Ocean.
