= Montreal Island (Nunavut) =

Island in Nunavut, Canada

- Location within Nunavut Location within Canada

Geography
- Location: Northern Canada
- Coordinates: 67°49′N 096°05′W
- Archipelago: Arctic Archipelago

Administration
- Canada
- Territory: Nunavut

Demographics
- Population: Uninhabited
- Ethnic groups: Inuit

Montreal Island is located in Chantrey Inlet, Nunavut, Canada. The island has an area of 25 km^{2} (9.7 sq mi) and a perimeter of 31 km (19 mi).

Sir George Back visited the island in 1834 after descending Back River which now bears his name. He left a cache of supplies on the island, which was found in 1839 on a later Arctic expedition by the Scottish explorer Thomas Simpson. Around 1850 some survivors of Franklin's lost expedition probably reached the island. In 1855, James Anderson and James Stewart of the Hudson's Bay Company descended Back River, crossed to the island and found Franklin relics.

The island is not to be confused with the Island of Montreal in southwest Quebec, on which the city of Montreal is located. Coincidentally, the Quebec island is also situated on a river known as the Back River, the colloquial English name for the Rivière des Prairies.
