= Flat Top, Virginia =

Unincorporated community in Virginia, United States

Coordinates: 37°01′44″N 82°23′51″W

Flat Top is an unincorporated community in Dickenson County, Virginia, United States.

== History ==
Flat Top was so named from the presence of a flat pasture where cattle would graze.
