= Ivuniraarjuq Island =

Island in Nunavut, Canada

- Location within Nunavut Location within Canada

Geography
- Location: Hudson Bay
- Coordinates: 61°51′N 92°32′W
- Archipelago: Arctic Archipelago

Administration
- Canada
- Nunavut: Nunavut
- Region: Kivalliq

Demographics
- Population: Uninhabited

Ivuniraarjuq Island is one of several Canadian arctic islands in Nunavut, Canada within western Hudson Bay. The closest community is Whale Cove, 37.8 km (23.5 mi) to the west.
