= Garry Lake =

Lake in Nunavut, Canada

- Hanningajuq (Inuktitut)
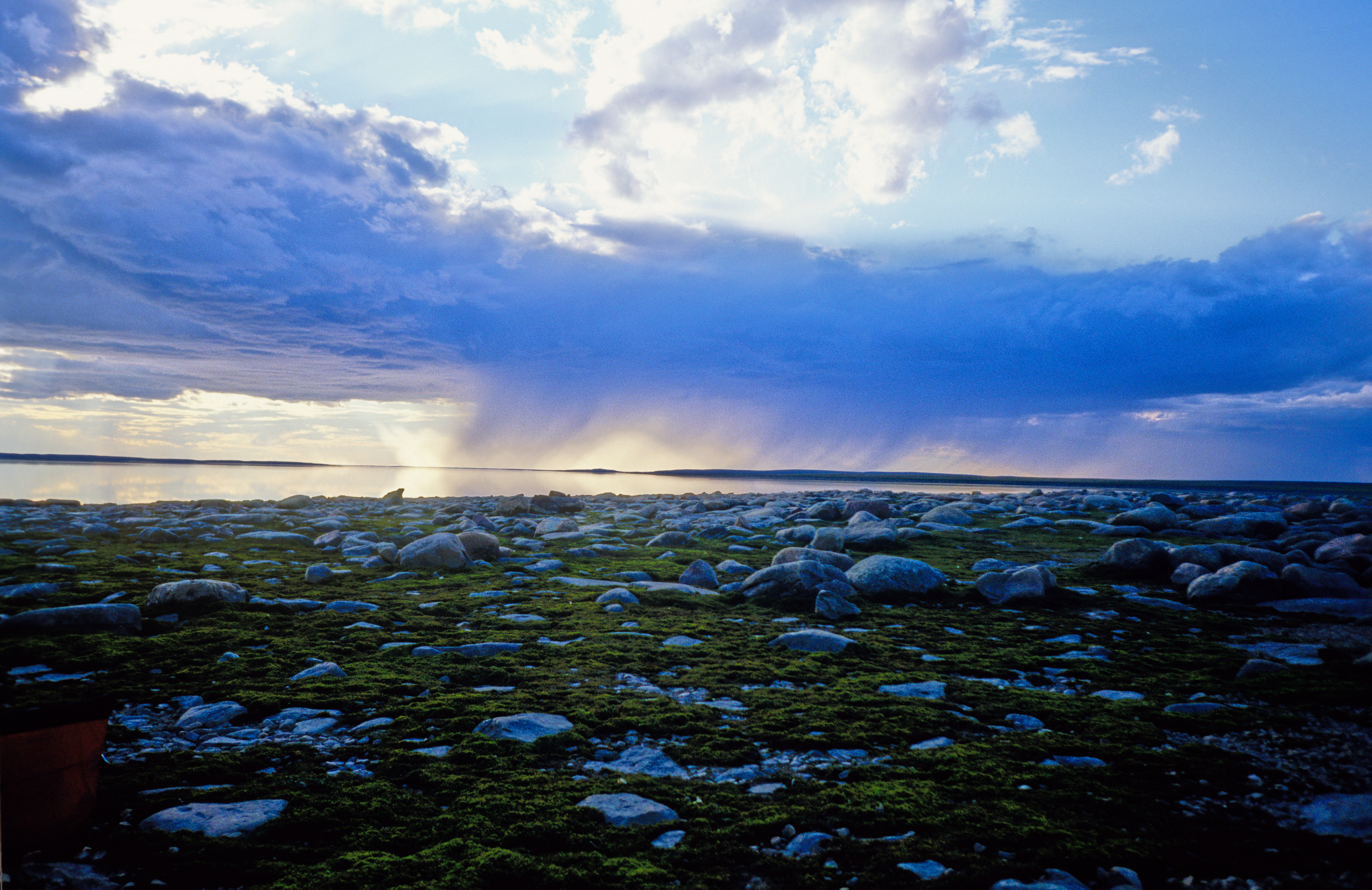

- Location in Nunavut
- Location: Kivalliq Region, Nunavut
- Coordinates: 65°53′N 99°51′W
- Primary inflows: Lake Pelly
- Primary outflows: Back River
- Basin countries: Canada
- Max. length: 97 km (60 mi)
- Max. width: 61 km (38 mi)
- Surface area: 976 km^{2} (377 sq mi)
- Average depth: 6.1 m (20 ft)
- Max. depth: 9.1 m (30 ft)
- Surface elevation: 148 m (486 ft)
- Islands: many
- Settlements: uninhabited

Garry Lake (variant: Garry Lakes; Inuktitut: Hanningajuq, meaning "sideways", or "crooked") is a lake in sub-Arctic Kivalliq Region, Nunavut, Canada. As a portion of the Back River waterway, Garry Lake originates directly east of Lake Pelly and drains to the east by the Back River. A set of rapids separate Buliard Lake (directly to the north) from Garry Lake. Two other sets of rapids separate Garry Lake's three sections (Upper Garry Lake, Garry Lake, Lower Garry Lake) which are also differentiated by elevation. Garry Lakes are isolated from nearby communities.

== Geography ==
Garry Lakes are a part of the Churchill craton—Rae craton geological province. It is a low relief area including sedge/grass meadows along lake shores, and substrates of glacial silts, sands, and gravels.

== Fauna ==
As moulting Canada geese arrive in late summer, the Canadian Wildlife Service designated the area as a Key Migratory Bird Terrestrial Habitat site.

== Ethnography ==
Hanningajuq is the Inuktitut word for both Garry Lake and the Christian cross. Garry Lake was historically home to Inuit who refer to themselves as Hanningajurmiut or Hanningaruqmiut or Hanningajulinmiut, meaning "the people of the place that lies across". Inuit to the north (the Utkusiksalinmiut) refer to Garry Lake Inuit as Ualininmiut ("people from the area of which the sun follows east to west"). The Garry Lake Inuktitut dialect is related to Utkuhiksalik, the dialect of the Utkuhiksalingmiut. Like other Caribou Inuit, Hanningajurmiut life consisted of tracking Arctic wildlife—Beverly herd of the barren-ground caribou, and fishing (whitefish and lake trout). They lived in igloos in the winter months, and caribou skin tents in the summer months.

Between 1948 and 1955, Hanningajurmiut were able to trade at Kitikmeot fur trader Stephen Angulalik's outpost located at Atanikittuq ("little connection") at Sherman Inlet. A Roman Catholic mission post was established on an island in Garry Lake in 1949, staffed by Father Joseph Buliard, who disappeared in 1956. The cabin still stands in present day. Suffering from famine in 1958 as the annual caribou migration bypassed their territorial hunting grounds, 58 Garry Lake inhabitants died. The federal government intervened by relocating the 31 survivors to Baker Lake. Most Hanningajurmiut never returned to Garry Lake on a permanent basis.

William Noah, Community Liaison Officer for Areva Resources Canada in Nunavut toured around Garry Lake on August 11, 2009, along with Paul Atuutuva, Betsy Aksawnee, Silas Kenalugak, and David Aksawnee. The pilot was with Forest Helicopters, working on contract for Kiggavik camp for Areva Resources Uranium Camp, 80 km (50 mi) west of Baker Lake. They found a bag and some small items that were still fresh in the attic of the old Buliard mission.

== Minerals ==
In 1981, Kidd Creek Minerals discovered 19 uraniferous boulders in a train formation, extending approximately 1.5 km (0.93 mi) along Garry Lake's north shore. In 2007, Uravan Minerals Inc. surveyed Garry Lake's uranium-rich area and made plans for a multi-phased drill program/exploration project for 2008.

== See also ==
- List of lakes of Nunavut
- List of lakes of Canada
