= Walrus Island (Hudson Bay) =

Island in Hudson Bay, Nunavut, Canada

- Location within Nunavut Location within Canada

Geography
- Location: Hudson Bay
- Coordinates: 61°58′N 92°29′W
- Archipelago: Arctic Archipelago

Administration
- Canada
- Territory: Nunavut
- Region: Kivalliq

Demographics
- Population: Uninhabited

Walrus Island is one of the uninhabited Canadian arctic islands in the Kivalliq Region, Nunavut. It is located within western Hudson Bay. The hamlet of Whale Cove is 24.6 km (15.3 mi) to the northwest.
