= Whale Cove, Nunavut =

Whale Cove ᑎᑭᕋᕐᔪᐊᖅ Tikirarjuaq
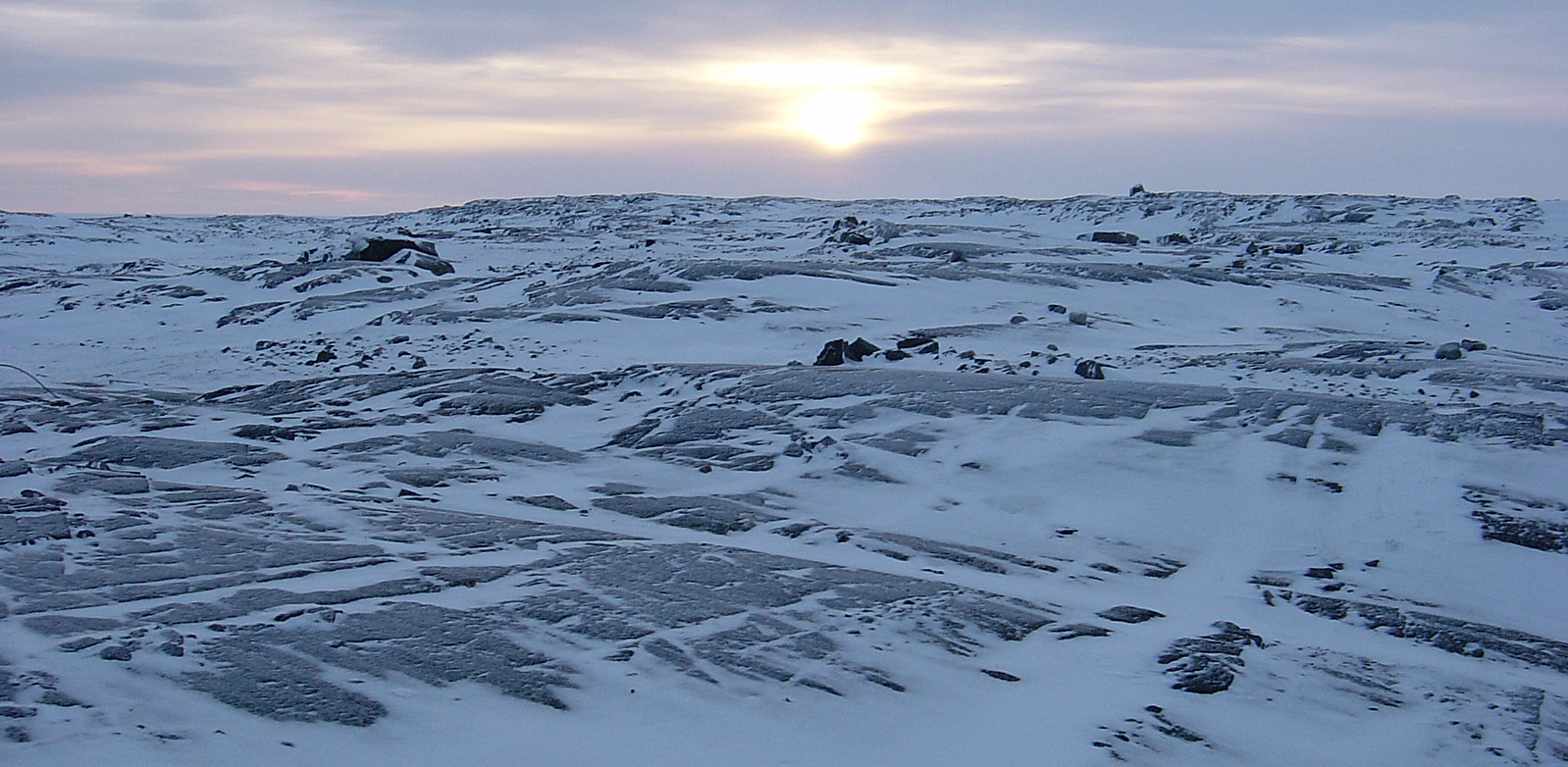

- Location within Nunavut Location within Canada
- Coordinates: 62°10′15″N 092°34′40″W
- Country: Canada
- Territory: Nunavut
- Region: Kivalliq
- Electoral district: Arviat North-Whale Cove

Government
  - Type: Hamlet Council
  - Mayor: Oliver Shipton
  - Senior Administrative Officer: Brian Fleming
  - MLA: John Main

Area (2021)
  - Total: 273.89 km^{2} (105.75 sq mi)
- Elevation: 40 m (130 ft)

Population (2021)
  - Total: 470
  - Density: 1.7/km^{2} (4.4/sq mi)
- Time zone: UTC−06:00 (CST)
  - Summer (DST): UTC−05:00 (CDT)
- Canadian Postal code: X0C 0J0
- Area code: 867
- Website: https://www.whalecove.ca/

Whale Cove (ᑎᑭᕋᕐᔪᐊᖅ in Inuktitut syllabics) (Tikirarjuaq, meaning "long point"), is a hamlet in the Kivalliq Region, Nunavut, Canada, on the western shore of Hudson Bay. It is located 74 km (46 mi) south southwest of Rankin Inlet and 145 km (90 mi) northeast of Arviat.

The community is named for the many beluga whales which congregate off the coast. Many of the inhabitants hunt these whales every fall and use their by-products for their oil and food. Whale Cove, initially settled by three distinct Inuit groups (one inland and two coastal), is a relatively traditional community: 95% Inuit, who wear fur, hunt, fish, eat raw meat and fish. Several bowhead whales may appear in the area as well. Whale Cove is on the polar bear migration route.

Local Inuit regularly travel by snowmobile in the winter or by boat in summer months between the hamlet of Rankin Inlet and Whale Cove, a distance of 100 km (62 mi). The terrain is Arctic tundra, this consists mostly of rocks, mosses and lichens.

== History ==
Inuit in the Whale Cove area traded whale oil, baleen, furs, leather and walrus tusks with the Hudson's Bay Company (HBC) since the mid-18th century when the HBC established their trading post at Churchill, Manitoba.

=== Relocations 1950s ===
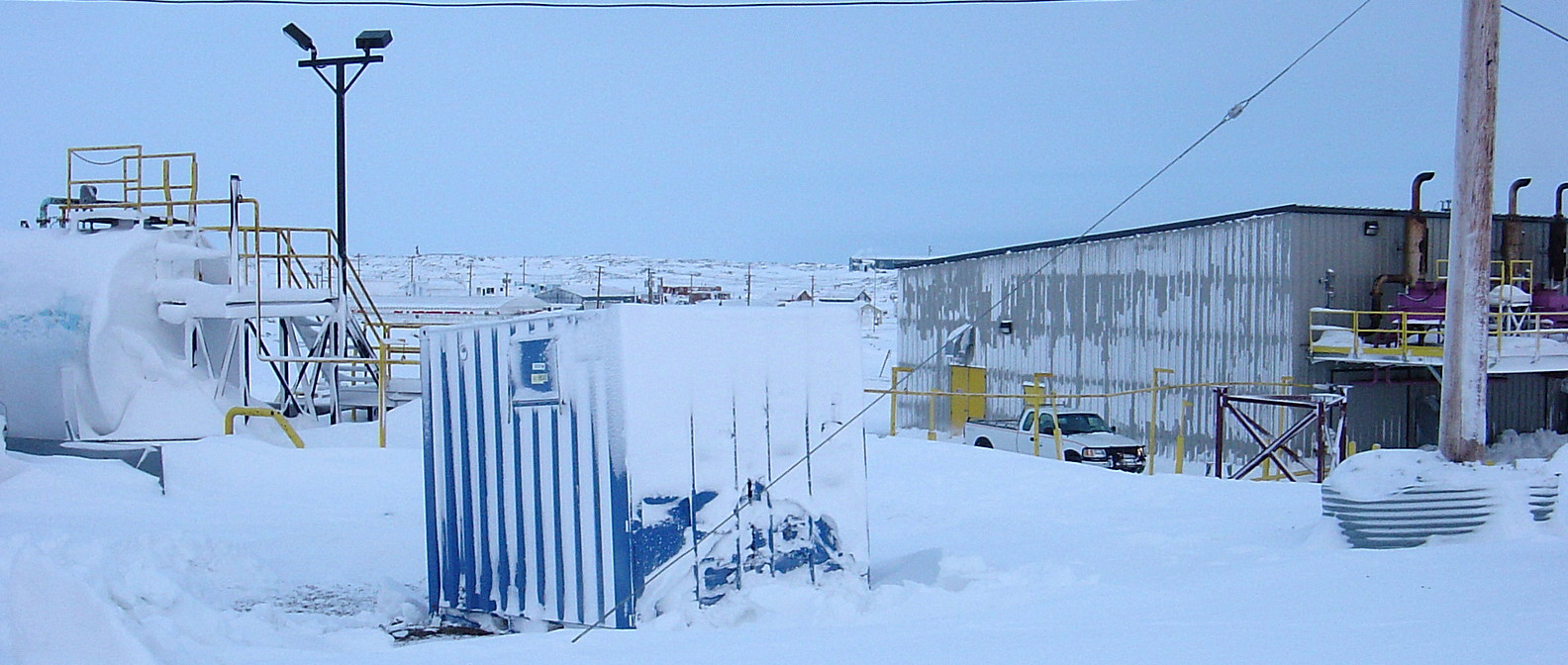
Whale Cove

In the 1950s and 1960s Inuit were relocated in a series of moves from one hamlet to another, some of them arriving in Whale Cove, a hamlet created by the federal government for these Inuit groups. Some came from Ennadai Lake via Arviat to Whale Cove, other came from Back River via Garry Lake then the Baker Lake area to Whale Cove. By the 1970s Inuit living in Whale Cove represented both coastal Inuit from Rankin Inlet and Arviat and different Caribou Inuit, hunters of barren-ground caribou from the Barren Grounds west of Hudson Bay, including the Ahiarmiut ("the out-of-the-way dwellers") or Ihalmiut ("people from beyond"), or on the banks of the Kazan River, Ennadai Lake, Little Dubawnt Lake (Kamilikuak), and north of Kugjuaq (officially Thlewiaza; "Big River"), had been relocated in the 1950s Whale Cove and Henik Lake. by the Department of Northern Affairs and Natural Resources (now Crown–Indigenous Relations and Northern Affairs Canada). Their hunting experience was based almost entirely on "inland caribou herds that had thinned by the 1950s and left many families hungry. Coastal dwelling Inuit from Rankin Inlet and Arviat were relocated to Whale Cove from nearby coastal communities in order to aid the inlanders in adapting to a marine subsistence economy."

=== Ennadai Lake relocations 1950–1960s ===
In the late 1960s a famine swept the land. Inuit were forced to walk towards places like Arviat to escape the desperation. Survivors who couldn't walk were airlifted to Whale Cove, Baker Lake and Rankin Inlet.

== Demographics ==
Federal census population history of Whale Cove
Year	Pop.	±%
1976	179	—
1981	188	+5.0%
1986	210	+11.7%
1991	235	+11.9%
1996	301	+28.1%
2001	305	+1.3%
2006	353	+15.7%
2011	407	+15.3%
2016	435	+6.9%
2021	470	+8.0%
Source: Statistics Canada

In the 2021 Canadian census conducted by Statistics Canada, Whale Cove had a population of 470 living in 116 of its 128 total private dwellings, a change of 8% from its 2016 population of 435. With a land area of 273.89 km^{2} (105.75 sq mi), it had a population density of 1.7/km^{2} (4.4/sq mi) in 2021.

== Self-government ==
In 1973, the Inuit Tapirisat of Canada (now Inuit Tapiriit Kanatami) initiated the Inuit Land Use and Occupancy Project and anthropologist David Hoffman conducted fieldwork in Whale Cove as part of a team of experts contributing to this project. The project under Milton Freeman, documented the total Inuit land use area of the Northwest Territories, then stretching from the Mackenzie River to east Baffin Island, to provide information in support of the fact that Inuit have used and occupied this vast northern land since time immemorial and that they still use and occupy it to this day.

== Economic development ==
Whale Cove companies and organizations, community and government services, the Kivalliq Inuit Association, Issatik Co-op, Nunavut Arctic College, Calm Air, Nolinor Aviation, Service Canada, the Royal Canadian Mounted Police, Sakku Development Corp., Nunavut Development Corp, Agnico Eagle, The North West Company, Kivalliq Partners in Development and ED&T. made presentations at the first Economic Development Day held at the Inuglak School gymnasium, in Whale Cove on 20 September 2011.

According to the Nunavut Planning Commission Whale Cove region's potential non-renewable resources include: "gold, diamonds, uranium, base metals, and nickel-copper platinum group elements (PGEs)".

== Broadband communications ==
The community has been served by the Qiniq network since 2005. Qiniq is a fixed wireless service to homes and businesses, connecting to the outside world via a satellite backbone. The Qiniq network is designed and operated by SSi Canada. In 2017, the network was upgraded to 4G LTE technology, and 2G-GSM for mobile voice. In September 2019, Bell Mobility established a data tower and provides high-speed mobile and internet connectivity within the community. Telus users will also receive coverage due to the Bell/TELUS cellular partnership.

== Climate ==
Whale Cove features a cold subarctic climate (Köppen: Dfc; Trewartha: Ecld), bordering closely on a tundra climate; with cold winters averaging around −23 °C (−9 °F), and cool, very wet and rainy summers averaging around 7.2 °C (45.0 °F); but temperatures of 25 °C (77 °F) or above are possible. Winters run from October/November until April/May with temperatures averaging between −14.5 and −29.6 °C (5.9 and −21.3 °F). Summers run from June to September, and average temperatures range from 3.9 to 10.1 °C (39.0 to 50.2 °F). Summers are usually cool, wet, and rainy, but can be warm, with a record high of 29.0 °C (84.2 °F). Summers typically last four months.

Climate data for Whale Cove (Whale Cove Airport) Climate ID: 2303986 coordinates 62°14′24″N 92°35′53″W; elevation: 12.2 m (40 ft); 1991–2020 normals, extremes 1985–present
Month	Jan	Feb	Mar	Apr	May	Jun	Jul	Aug	Sep	Oct	Nov	Dec	Year
Record high humidex	−5.9	−6.3	1.8	2.4	14.4	23.3	28.4	27.5	21.5	7.1	1.8	0.0	28.4
Record high °C (°F)	−2.0 (28.4)	−4.0 (24.8)	2.0 (35.6)	10.0 (50.0)	10.5 (50.9)	24.0 (75.2)	26.0 (78.8)	29.0 (84.2)	20.0 (68.0)	21.0 (69.8)	10.0 (50.0)	0.0 (32.0)	29.0 (84.2)
Mean daily maximum °C (°F)	−26.0 (−14.8)	−25.5 (−13.9)	−19.4 (−2.9)	−10.0 (14.0)	−2.0 (28.4)	7.1 (44.8)	13.8 (56.8)	12.9 (55.2)	6.6 (43.9)	−0.8 (30.6)	−11.7 (10.9)	−19.8 (−3.6)	−6.2 (20.8)
Daily mean °C (°F)	−29.6 (−21.3)	−29.1 (−20.4)	−23.8 (−10.8)	−14.5 (5.9)	−5.1 (22.8)	3.9 (39.0)	10.0 (50.0)	10.1 (50.2)	4.6 (40.3)	−3.0 (26.6)	−15.3 (4.5)	−23.5 (−10.3)	−9.6 (14.7)
Mean daily minimum °C (°F)	−33.2 (−27.8)	−32.7 (−26.9)	−28.2 (−18.8)	−18.8 (−1.8)	−8.3 (17.1)	0.7 (33.3)	6.2 (43.2)	7.2 (45.0)	2.5 (36.5)	−5.2 (22.6)	−19.0 (−2.2)	−27.3 (−17.1)	−13.0 (8.6)
Record low °C (°F)	−44.0 (−47.2)	−47.5 (−53.5)	−43.0 (−45.4)	−36.0 (−32.8)	−25.5 (−13.9)	−9.5 (14.9)	−3.0 (26.6)	−1.0 (30.2)	−8.0 (17.6)	−24.5 (−12.1)	−34.0 (−29.2)	−43.5 (−46.3)	−47.5 (−53.5)
Record low wind chill	−63.8	−68.9	−61.1	−48.4	−34.7	−16.0	0.0	0.0	−16.9	−39.6	−53.6	−59.3	−68.9
Average precipitation mm (inches)	14.9 (0.59)	9.9 (0.39)	13.2 (0.52)	14.6 (0.57)	15.5 (0.61)	24.1 (0.95)	38.7 (1.52)	59.6 (2.35)	51.6 (2.03)	29.5 (1.16)	19.9 (0.78)	14.7 (0.58)	306.3 (12.06)
Average rainfall mm (inches)	0.0 (0.0)	0.0 (0.0)	0.0 (0.0)	0.4 (0.02)	4.6 (0.18)	21.8 (0.86)	38.7 (1.52)	59.6 (2.35)	46.7 (1.84)	11.0 (0.43)	0.1 (0.00)	0.0 (0.0)	182.9 (7.20)
Average snowfall cm (inches)	15.9 (6.3)	10.0 (3.9)	14.0 (5.5)	14.5 (5.7)	10.9 (4.3)	2.4 (0.9)	0.0 (0.0)	0.0 (0.0)	4.9 (1.9)	19.4 (7.6)	20.8 (8.2)	16.5 (6.5)	129.4 (50.9)
Average precipitation days (≥ 0.2 mm)	9.8	6.7	7.9	6.7	6.7	7.6	10.4	14.0	14.0	13.3	10.8	7.7	115.5
Average rainy days (≥ 0.2 mm)	0.0	0.0	0.0	0.30	1.7	7.1	10.4	14.0	12.0	4.3	0.23	0.0	50.0
Average snowy days (≥ 0.2 cm)	9.7	6.8	7.9	6.5	5.4	0.95	0.0	0.0	2.7	10.0	10.7	8.0	68.5
Source: Environment and Climate Change Canada (humidex and wind chill 1981-2010)

== Notable people from Whale Cove ==
John Adjuk (1913 Back River -2006 Whale Cove) moved with his family to Whale Cove in March 1964 from the Baker Lake area. Originally from the Back River area (Chantrey Inlet) north of Baker Lake, living the traditional way of life on the land, he moved to the Garry Lake area. Following famine in the Garry Lake area, he was evacuated to Baker (Lake Qamanittuaq) in 1955. In 1955 they returned to Garry Lake but in early 1958 the family of five was evacuated to the community of Baker Lake when famine struck the land. The Hanningajurmiut, or Hanningaruqmiut, or Hanningajulinmiut ("the people of the place that lies across") lived at Garry Lake, south of the Utkuhiksalingmiut. Many Hanningajurmiut starved in 1958 when the caribou bypassed their traditional hunting grounds, but the 31 who survived were relocated to Baker. Most never returned permanently to Garry Lake. (Note: First generation Inuit artists such as Jessie Oonark, Marion Tuu'luq and camp leader Luke Anguhadluq (1895–1982) were also born in the Back River area of Nunavut and were evacuated to Baker Lake because of starvation in 1967.) In March, 1964, the Adjuk family, which now included six daughters, moved to Whale Cove because it was thought the hunting and fishing was better.

== Education ==
Nunavut Arctic College has a branch in Whale Cove.

== See also ==
- List of municipalities in Nunavut
- Levinia Brown
