= Utkuhiksalik =

Sub-dialect of Natsilingmiutut

- Utkuhiksalingmiutitut
- Native to: Canada
- Region: North America
- Language family: Eskaleut: Eskimo; Inuit; Inuvialuktun; Natsilik; Utkuhiksalik

Language codes
- ISO 639-3: –
- Linguist List: ikt-gjo
- Glottolog: None

Utkuhiksalik, also known as Utkuhikhalik, Utkuhikhaliq, Utkuhiksalingmiutitut, Utkuhiksalingmiutut, Utkuhiksalingmiut Inuktitut, Utku, or the Gjoa Haven dialect, is a sub-dialect of Natsilingmiutut (Nattiliŋmiut) dialect of Inuvialuktun (Western Canadian Inuit or Inuktitut) language once spoken in the Utkuhiksalik (ᐅᑦᑯᓯᒃᓴᓕᒃ Chantrey Inlet) area of Nunavut, and now spoken mainly by elders in Uqsuqtuuq (or Uqšuqtuuq ᐅᖅᓱᖅᑑᖅ Gjoa Haven) and Qamani'tuaq (ᖃᒪᓂ‛ᑐᐊᖅ Baker Lake) on mainland Canada. It is generally written in Inuktitut syllabics.

The traditional territory of the Utkuhiksalingmiut / Utkuhikhalingmiut / Ukkusiksalingmiut / Utkusiksalinmiut / Ukkuhikhalinmiut (meaning "the people of the place where there is soapstone" or "people who have cooking pots") people lay between Chantrey Inlet and Franklin Lake. They made their pots (utkuhik ~ utkusik) from soapstone of the area, therefore their name.

Utkuhiksalik has been analysed as a subdialect of Natsilik within the Western Canadian Inuktun (Inuvialuktun) dialect continuum. While Utkuhiksalik has much in common with the other Natsilik subdialects, the Utkuhiksalingmiut and the Natsilingmiut were historically distinct groups. Today there are still lexical and phonological differences between Utkuhiksalik and Natsilik.

== Comparison ==
Utkuhiksalik closely related to Natsilik. The comparison of some words in the two sub-dialects:

- Utkuhiksalik ařgaq 'hand' (Natsilik proper ažgak)
- Utkuhiksalik aqiřgiq 'ptarmigan' (Natsilik proper aqigžeq)
- Utkuhiksalik ipřit 'you' (Natsilik proper ižvit)

== Franz Boas ==
Franz Boas included the Ukusiksalirmiut as a tribe of the "Central Eskimo" in the 1888 Sixth Annual Report of the Bureau of Ethnology to the Smithsonian Institution,

The last tribe of the Central Eskimo, the Ukusiksalirmiut, inhabit the estuary of Back River. They were met by Back and by Anderson and Stewart. Recently Schwatka and his party communicated with them on their visit to King William Land. Klutschak affirms that they are the remains of a strong tribe which formerly inhabited Adelaide Peninsula but was supplanted by the Netchillirmiut and the Ugjulirmiut. Klutschak calls them Ukusiksalik; Gilder, sometimes Ukusiksalik, sometimes Ugjulik. The latter author relates that a single family living on Hayes River (Kugnuaq) had formerly had its station on Adelaide Peninsula, but had retired to this country when the warlike Netchillirmiut began to visit King William Land and Adelaide Peninsula. Schwatka could identify the same man with one of those whom Back had seen in the estuary of the river in 1833 (Gilder, p. 78). Therefore they must have lived in this district a long time before the Netchillirmiut began to move westward. According to Back the party with which he fell in did not know the land beyond the estuary of Back River, which indicates that they were neither from Ugjulik nor Netchillik. As the Ugjulirmiut lived on Adelaide Peninsula when Ross wintered in Boothia, I do not consider it probable that the Ukusiksalirmiut ever lived in that part of the country, and I cannot agree with Klutschak. I may add Parry's remark, that beyond Ukusiksalik (Wager River) another Ukusiksalik (Back River) was known to the natives of Winter Island. The reports on their mode of life are very deficient. They were met by Schwatka a little above the great bend of Hayes River in May, 1879; he also met another party in December at the Dangerous Rapids of Back River. Schwatka counted seven families at the former and nine at the latter place. Their principal food consisted of fish, which are caught in abundance in Back River (Klutschak, p. 164). It is said that they have no fuel during the winter. Undoubtedly they use some kind of fuel, and I rather doubt the implication that they do not hunt seals at all. The musk ox and fish, however, are their main food, according to both Klutschak and Gilder. It is very remarkable that all the natives west of Boothia depend much more on fish than do any other tribes of the Central Eskimo.

— Franz Boas

He considered the Ukusiksalik (Wager River) to be one of "five principal settlements" which included the "Aivillirmiut are Pikiulaq (Depot Island), Nuvung and Ukusiksalik (Wager River), Aivillik (Repulse Bay), Akugdlit (Committee Bay), and Maluksilaq (Lyon Inlet). They may be divided into two groups, the former comprising the southern settlements, the latter the northern ones. Every one of these settlements has certain well known sites, which are frequented at the proper seasons." Their team was not able to make the sledge journeys by ice from Nuvung to Ukusiksalik in the winter of 1864-1865 because large water holes were formed at "the entrance of the bay." In his appendix Boas included Ukusiksalik, "the place with pot stone" and Ukusiksalirmiut, "inhabitant of Ukusiksalik."

== Knud Rasmussen ==
The Danish explorer, Knud Rasmussen during his Fifth Thule Expedition, when he crossed the Canadian Arctic, often by dogsled, visited the Jessie Oonark's camp when she was just a teenager. For the remote Utkuhikhalingmiut, he represented the first white contact. In the 1980s, Mame Jackson taped Jessie Oonark speaking in Utkuhiksalik and describing this encounter. The interview was broadcast on CBC radio.

== Inuit artists ==
Well-known first generation Inuit artists, such as Jessie Oonark, CM OC RCA ( ᔨᐊᓯ ᐅᓈᖅ; 2 March 1906 - 7 March 1985), Luke Anguhadluk and Marion Tuu'luuq were known as fluent speakers of Utkuhiksalik. Their art work like that of the next generation, which includes many of Oonark's children, reflects many aspects of the Utkuhikhalingmiut culture.

== Dictionary ==
A complete dictionary of Utkuhiksalik was first published in 2015, marking an important contribution to the preservation of the sub-dialect. Jean Briggs, an anthropologist and expert on Inuit languages, helped to compile the dictionary.

== See also ==
- Ukkusiksalik National Park
