= Back River (Nunavut) =

Major river in northern Canada

Back River Great Fish River
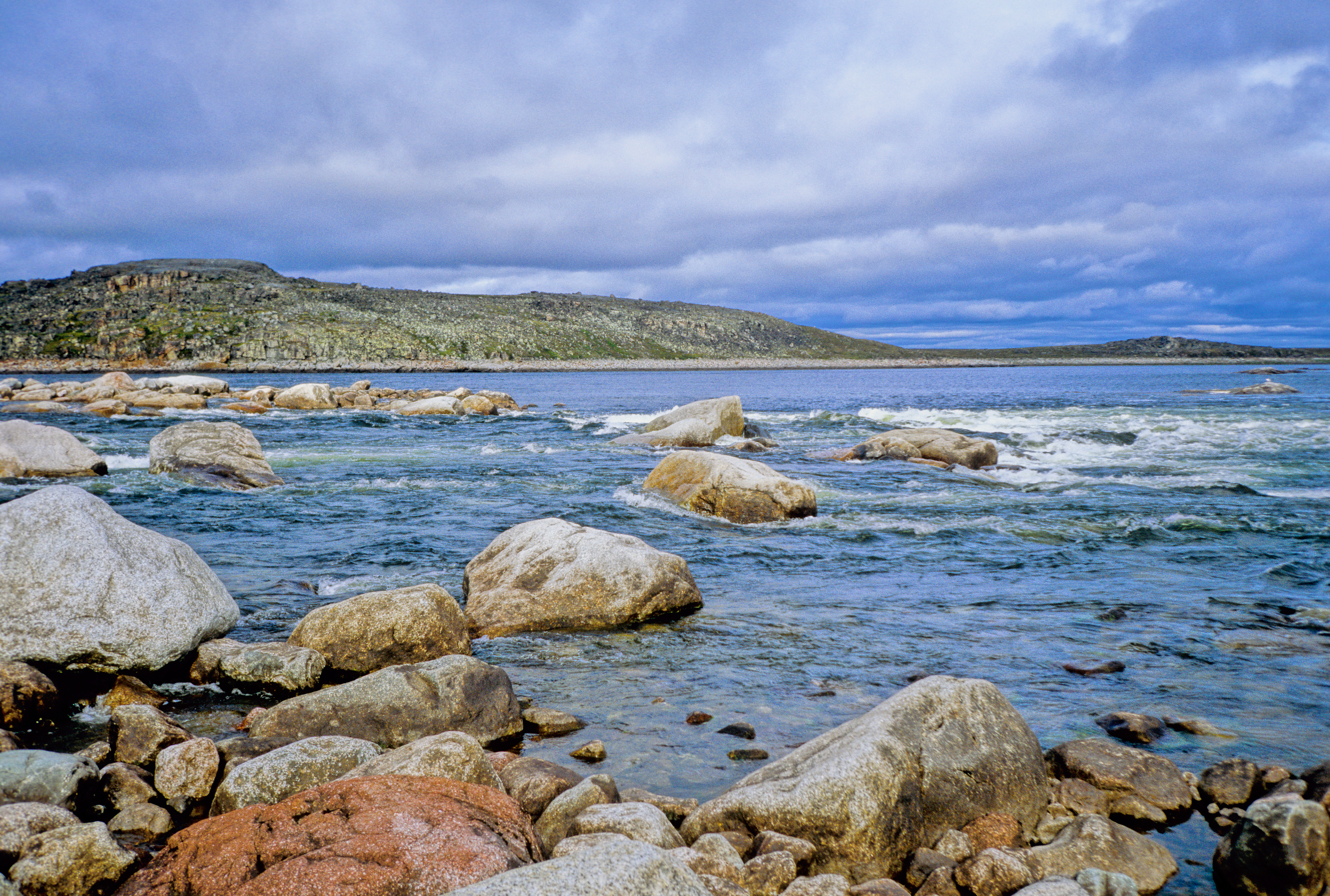
- Rock garden on the Back River in July 2006

- Back River mouth location in Canada Back River (Nunavut) (Canada)
- Etymology: Named after Sir George Back
- Native name: Thlewechodyeth (Tlicho); Haningayok (Inuktitut)

Location
- Country: Canada
- Territories: Nunavut & Northwest Territories

Physical characteristics
- Source: Unnamed lake
  - location: North Slave Region, Northwest Territories
  - coordinates: 64°43′38″N 108°02′08″W
  - elevation: 382 m (1,253 ft)
- Mouth: Chantrey Inlet, Arctic Ocean
  - location: Kitikmeot Region, Nunavut
  - coordinates: 67°16′00″N 95°15′00″W
  - elevation: 0 m (0 ft)
- Length: 974 km (605 mi)
- Basin size: 106,500 km^{2} (41,100 sq mi)
- Discharge
  - average: 612 m^{3}/s (21,600 cu ft/s)

The Back River, formerly Backs River (Dogrib: Thlewechodyeth, Inuktitut: Haningayok, or Great Fish River), is the 20th longest Canadian river and is located in the Northwest Territories and Nunavut. It rises at an unnamed lake in the North Slave Region of the Northwest Territories and flows more than 974 km (605 mi) mostly through the Kivalliq Region, Nunavut, to its mouth at the Arctic Ocean in the Kitikmeot Region of Nunavut.

== Course ==
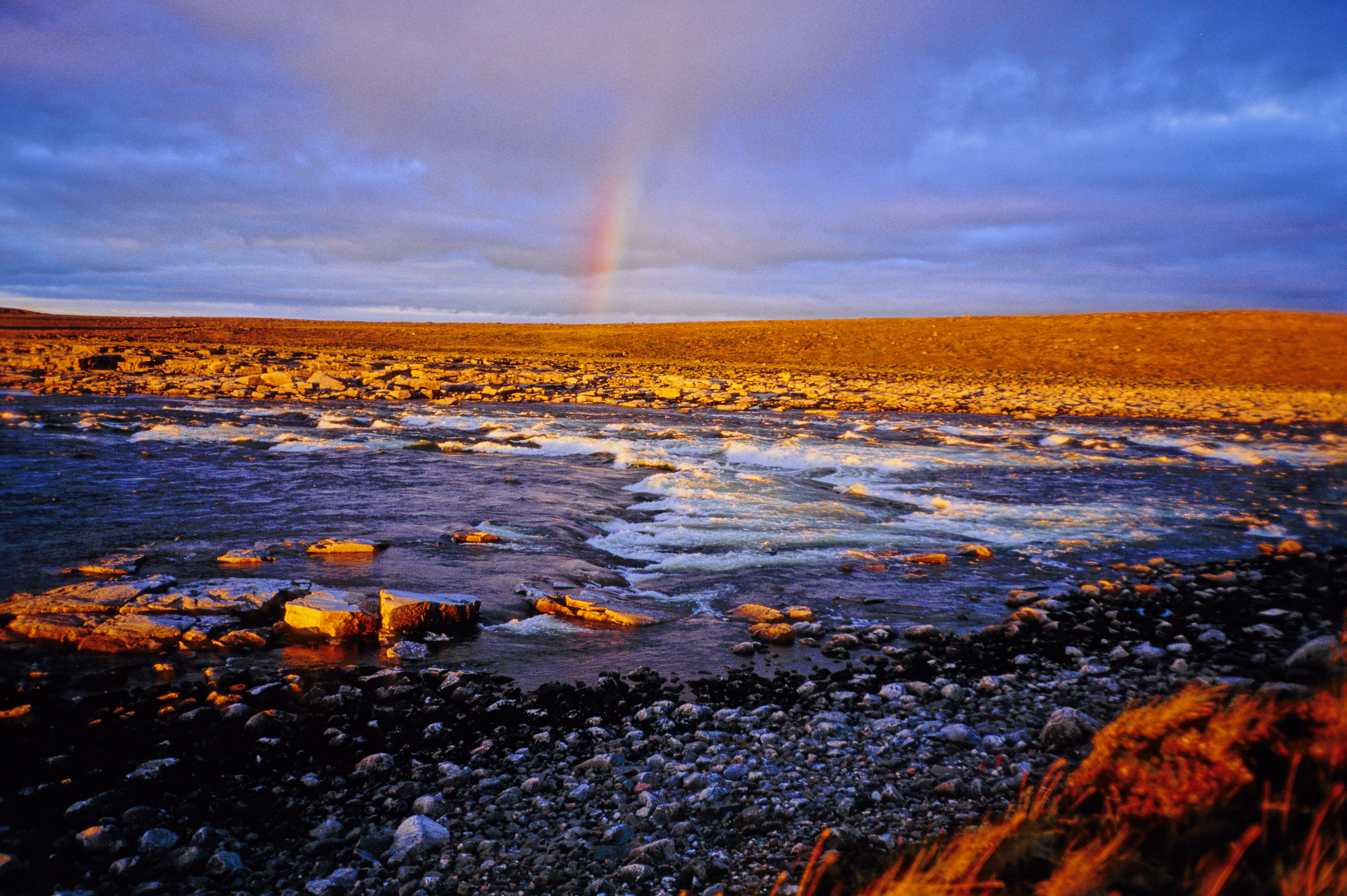
Head of the Escape Rapids, August 2006

The river begins at the outflow of an unnamed lake at an elevation of 382 m (1,253 ft) and flows west into Sussex Lake, then north to Muskox Lake, at the border between the Northwest Territories and the Kivalliq Region, Nunavut, where it takes in the left tributary Icy River. It flows over the Muskox Rapids, takes in the left tributary Contwoyto River, and heads east through the Heywood Range. The Back River heads over the Malley Rapids, takes in the left tributary Siorak River and enters the long lake-expansion Lake Beechey in a southeast direction. It heads east, takes in the right tributary Baillie River, left tributary Warren River, right tributary Jervoise River, passes over the Hawk Rapids, takes in the right tributary McKinley River and right tributary Consul River. Between the Baillie and Consul Rivers, the Back River forms the northern border of the Thelon Wildlife Sanctuary. The river turns northeast, takes in the left tributary Bullen River, and reaches Pelly Lake at an elevation of 155 m (509 ft). It flows east through, in immediate succession: Upper Garry Lake, where it takes in the right tributary Morse River; Garry Lake; Lower Garry Lake; Buliard Lake; Upper MacDougall Lake; and Lower MacDougall Lake. The Back River then heads over the Rock Rapids, Sinclair Falls, Escape Rapids, Sandhill Rapids, and Wolf Rapids, and takes in the right tributary Meadowbank River. The river curves around Mount Meadowbank, takes in the right tributary Hermann River and left tributary Montresor River, passes McKay Peak, heads over the Whirlpool Rapids, and reaches Franklin Lake. It continues northeast, takes in the right tributary Mistake River, passes north into Kitikmeot Region, takes in the right tributary Hayes River and reaches its mouth at Cockburn Bay on Chantrey Inlet on the Arctic Ocean.

== Watershed ==
The river has a watershed of 106,500 km^{2} (41,120 sq mi) and a mean discharge of 612 m^{3} (21,613 cu ft) per second. The river is 974 km (605 mi) long to the Muskox Lake outlet, though the river continues further upstream to its source.

Like the Coppermine, Hood, Dubawnt or Kazan, which are other large rivers in this part of Canada, it is navigable only by experienced canoeists because of the numerous and challenging 83 rapids.

The entire river is above the tree line.

== History ==
The Back River is the historic homeland of the Haningayogmiut (or Hanningajurmiut) Copper Inuit, also referred to as the Ualininmiut by their Caribou Inuit northern neighbours, the Utkusiksalinmiut. The Kaernermiut (also Kainermiut) and the southerly Ahiagmiut of the Copper Inuit also frequented this area. The Back River and Thelon River were also the northern and northeastern edges of the tribal territories of the enemy Yellowknives and Chipewyan to the south.

Its first exploration by Europeans was led by George Back in 1834, as part of an expedition initially mounted to seek the 1829 expedition of Captain John Ross. Back learned of the river from local guides, and throughout his memoir of the expedition he referred to the river as the "Thlew-ee-cho-dezeth", which he translated as "Great Fish River". Later 19th-century explorers habitually referred to the river as "Back's Great Fish River", but gradually this was shortened to "Back River" over time.

On abandoning their ships to the ice, the remaining members of Sir John Franklin's 1845 expedition to map a Northwest Passage set out for the Back River but did not survive. In search of them, James Anderson and James Stewart of the Hudson's Bay Company descended the river in 1855 to Chantrey Bay and Montreal Island.

After a hiatus of slightly over 100 years, it was again descended in 1962 by two groups. A British group of four young men was led by Robert Cundy, who wrote a book about their descent called Beacon Six. They started at Beechey Lake paddling three foldup kayaks, one of which was destroyed on the expedition. An American group of four led by Austin Hoyt started at the source of the river, Sussex Lake, with two cedar canvas canoes. Both groups filmed their trips. The British film, Beacon Six, was televised by the Canadian Broadcasting Corporation.

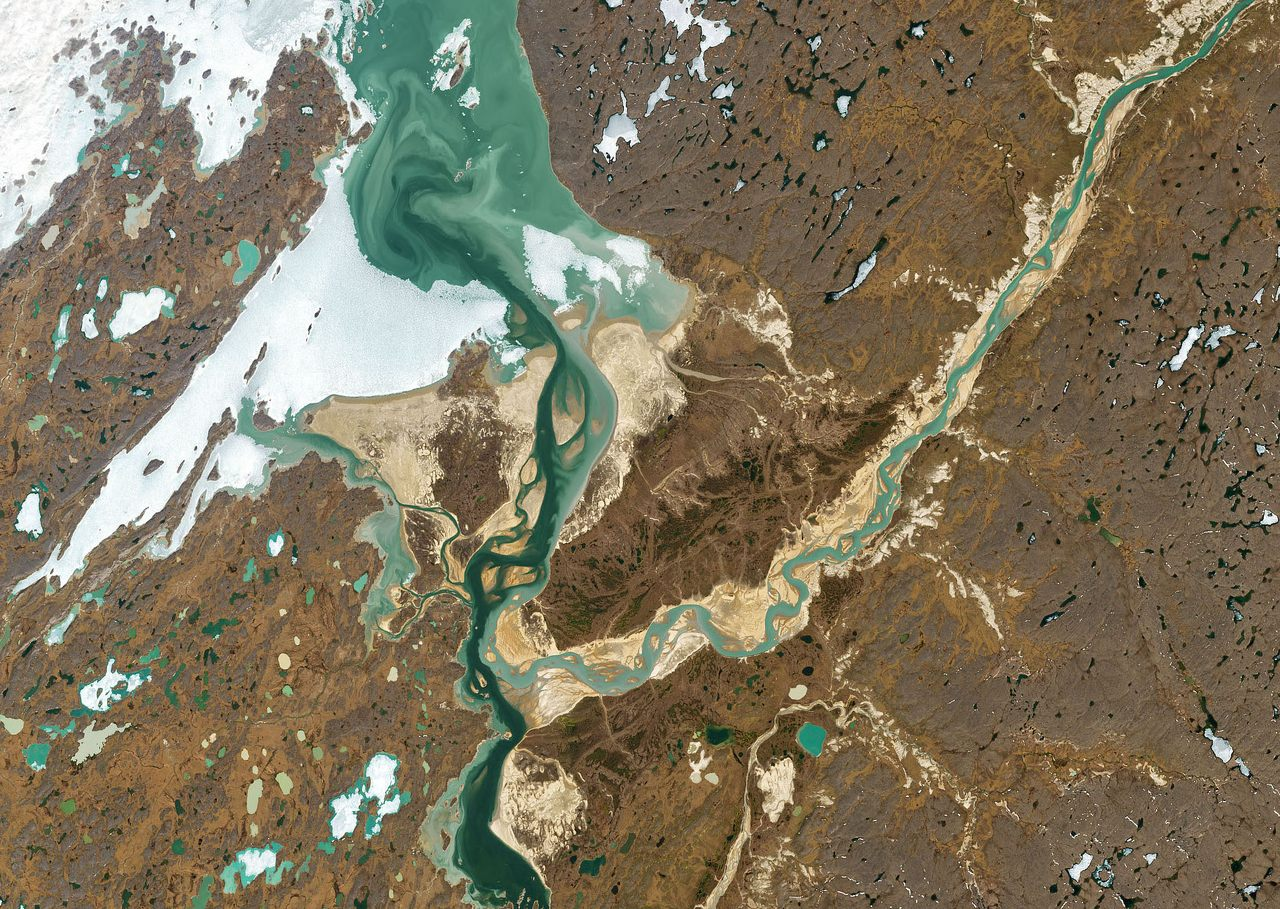
The lighter-colored Hayes River flows from the northeast (top right) into the dark Back River. Note the two flows remain distinct for about 10 miles downstream (towards photo-top). From NASA Earth Observatory

Over the course of 17 months in 1963–1965, anthropologist Jean Briggs did field research with the Utkusiksalinmiut Inuit living at the opening of Back River and Chantrey Inlet, resulting in her work Never in Anger, as well as helping to compile an Utkuhiksalik dictionary.

== Natural history ==
The area around the river is full of wildlife, with many fish in the river, as well as barren-ground caribou, muskoxen, and Hudson Bay wolves in the area, with occasional sightings of grizzly bears, wolverines and Arctic hares. Polar bears are also found as the river nears the Arctic Ocean. The Middle Back River Important Bird Area, located on the river in the Pelly Lake to Lower Garry Lake segment, is a significant habitat for Canada geese, the lesser snow goose and other waterfowl.

Like other areas in Northern Canada, Back River is subject to very cold weather and a persistent Arctic wind that gusts up to gale force.

== Modern canoeing ==
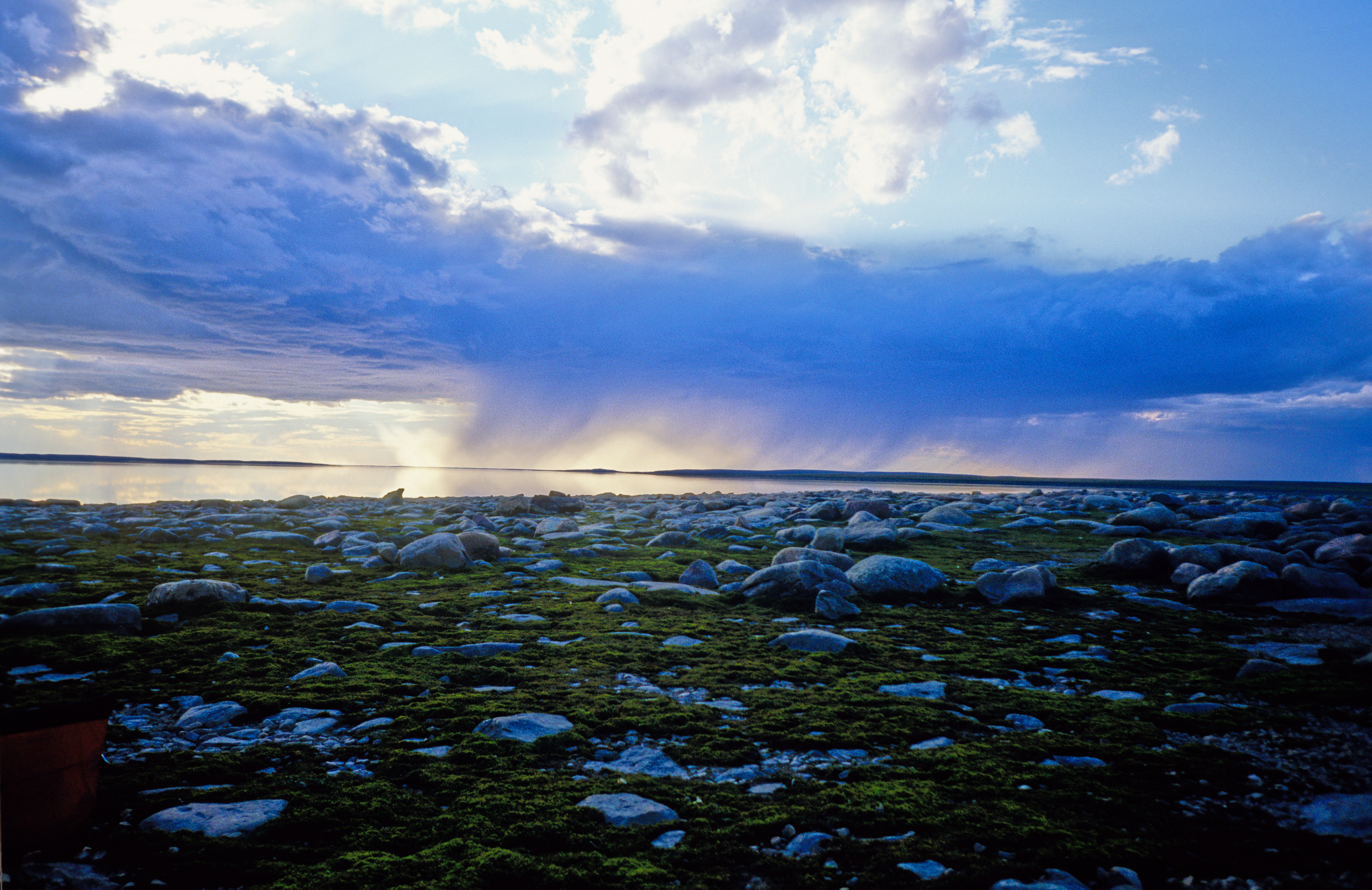
A view on Garry Lake

The Back River constitutes a long and difficult voyage, taking over a month of hard work by strong and experienced Arctic (duo) canoeists. The Back is much more challenging than either the Kazan River or the Dubawnt River. Many rapids end in dense "rock gardens" rendering portaging often mandatory. Such portages must be conducted on bare rocks and occasionally unstable boulders. The need for portage is generally lower after a set of rapids known as the "Escape Rapids", thereafter very many rapids (but not all) can be run, as the river becomes less rocky and risky. Water level permitting, two further areas of runnable rapids are notable: Sandhill rapids generally navigated on the left bank, Wolf rapids on the right.

Bear spray is recommended as a protection against polar bears on stretches of the river near the Arctic Ocean. Cooking fuel must also be brought in, as the river is above the tree line, and all vegetation is low-lying and not suitable for use as fuel.

The source of the river can be reached by floatplane from Yellowknife, N.W.T. At the end of the trip, a bush plane can be called in from Baker Lake in Nunavut for a landing in a prearranged spot in the tundra. One must make sure that a rigid canoe can be attached to the exterior of the bush plane. If not, a foldable canoe should be used instead of a rigid one.

The river can also be travelled to its end, where a boat tow can be arranged to the Inuit community of Gjoa Haven, which has commercial air service back to Yellowknife. If planning a canoeing trip on the river, due to the weather, it is generally recommended to have navigated Garry Lake by August 8, the mark of the seasonal change to worse weather. It needs to be noted that being windbound can happen at any time. Due to the proximity to the Arctic Circle and the associated cold, any capsizing can easily conclude in hypothermia and death. A spray deck-equipped canoe is strongly recommended both for lakes and rapids.

== Tributaries ==
- Hayes River (right)
- Mistake River (right)
- Hermann River (right)
- Meadowbank River (right)
- Bullen River (left)
- Consul River (right)
- McKinley River (right)
- Jervoise River (right)
- Warren River (left)
- Baillie River (right)
- Siorak River (left)
- Contwoyto River (left)
- Icy River (left)

== See also ==
- Back River volcanic complex
- List of rivers of Nunavut
- List of rivers of the Northwest Territories
