= Chantrey Inlet =

Bay on the Arctic coast of Canada

Coordinates: 67°45′N 095°54′W

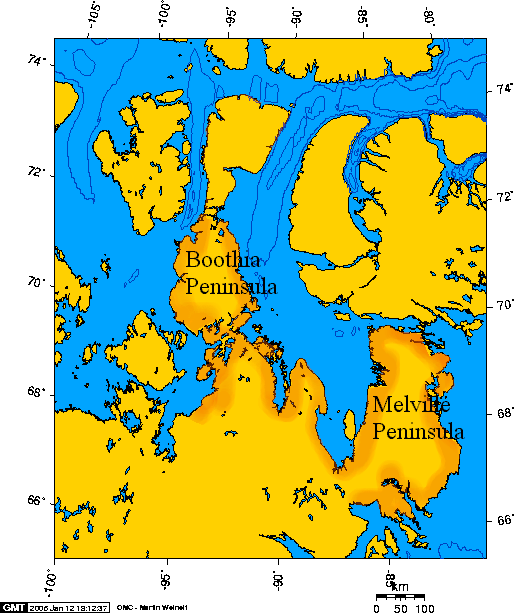
King William Island is the large island southwest of the Boothia Peninsula, and Chantrey Inlet is south of that, cutting south into the mainland.

Chantrey Inlet (Tariunnuaq) is a bay on the Arctic coast of Canada. It marks the southeast "corner" where the generally east–west coast turns sharply north. To the west is the Adelaide Peninsula and to the east is mainland. King William Island shelters it to the northwest. To the west the Simpson Strait separates King William Island from the Adelaide Peninsula. Its mouth is marked by Point Ogle on the west and Cape Britannia on the east. West of Point Ogle is Barrow Bay, Starvation Cove and Point Richardson. The Back River enters from the south. Near its mouth is a weather station on the Hayes River. Montreal Island is contained within the Inlet. It is 160 km (100 mi) long and 80 km (50 mi) wide at its mouth.

Chantrey Inlet is the historical territory of the Utkuhiksalik (the people of the place where there is soapstone), nomadic Inuit who lived in snowhouses (igloos) in the winter, tents in the summer, and whose diet centered on trout (lake trout and Arctic char), whitefish, and caribou. In 1834 George Back followed the Back River to its mouth and explored Chantrey Inlet. In 1839 Peter Warren Dease and Thomas Simpson reached it by sailing along the coast from the west. In the present day, sportsmen arrive in Chantrey Inlet by chartered bushplane for fishing.
