= Rae–Richardson Arctic expedition =

1848 British expedition to the Arctic

The Rae–Richardson Arctic expedition of 1848 was an early British effort to determine the fate of the lost Franklin Polar Expedition. Led overland by Sir John Richardson and John Rae, the party explored the accessible areas along Franklin's proposed route near the Mackenzie and Coppermine rivers. No contact with Franklin's party was achieved and Rae later interviewed the Inuit of the region, from whom he obtained credible accounts that the desperate remnants of Franklin's party had resorted to cannibalism. This revelation was so unpopular that Rae was shunned by the Admiralty and popular opinion; the search for Franklin continued for several years.

== Preparation ==
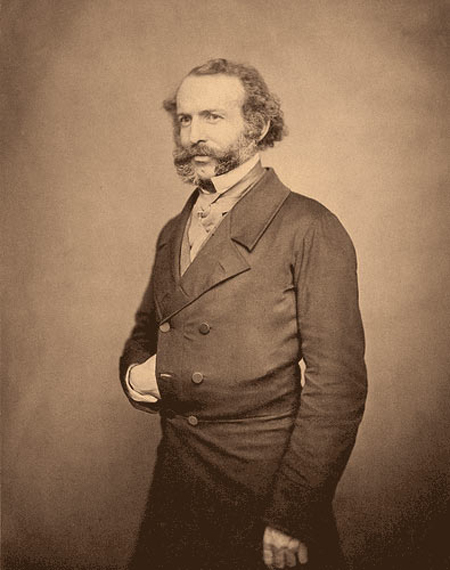
John Rae

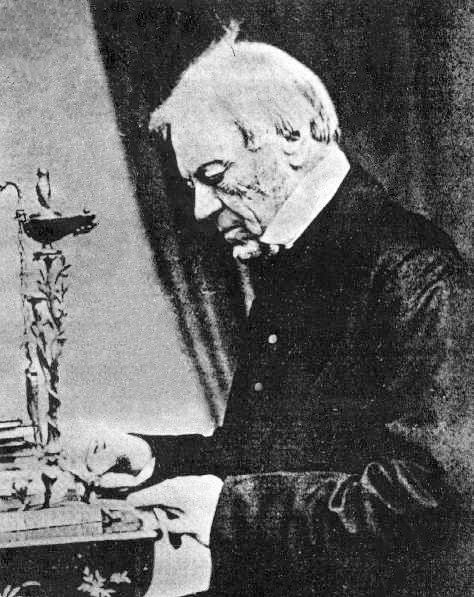
John Richardson

As early as 1847, it was believed that Franklin's forces were likely icebound. The British Admiralty devised a three-pronged rescue effort to address the three most likely escape routes for Franklin – eastwards via Lancaster Sound, southwards via the Mackenzie River (to the settlement of the Hudson's Bay Company fur traders), or westwards via the Bering Strait.

Sir John Richardson, who had participated in earlier Arctic expeditions with Franklin himself, took the objective of the Mackenzie River, tracing the coast between the Mackenzie and Coppermine rivers, as well as the shores of Victoria Island and the Wollaston Peninsula, then known as Victoria Land and Wollaston Lands, in an overland expedition.

Assuming the existence of an unknown but likely passage between these lands, it would have been the most direct route of travel consistent with Franklin's original exploration orders. John Rae of the Hudson's Bay Company was attached to this effort. Rae had 15 years of experience in the region and regarded the indigenous people with uncommon respect. It was planned that the expedition would extend their search by wintering in the area of Great Bear Lake.

Recent seasons of hunting in Rupert's Land (as the Hudson's Bay Company area was called) had been poor, so additional provisions were transported to the area in 1847, prior to Richardson's departure. These consisted of over 17,000 lb (7,700 kg) of canned pemmican. Four half-ton boats were constructed (at Portsmouth Dock Yard and Camper's Yard at Gosport) for the river navigation, about 30 by 6 ft (9.1 by 1.8 m) each, but designed so that the two smaller boats nest inside the two larger boats during shipping. Five seamen and fifteen sappers and miners were selected as the expedition crew, many also skilled in carpentry, blacksmithing and engineering. The company's men and supplies departed England on June 15, 1847, heading for Hudson Bay.

Ice in the Hudson Straits delayed the supply and crew landing until September 8, while Richardson completed his preparations in England. The Hudson's Bay Company provided transport of additional supply caches along their proposed route. Workers were deployed to fish and cut firewood in anticipation of the expedition. Richardson and Rae set out from Liverpool on March 25, 1848, landed in New York on April 10, and reaching Montreal four days later.

Two canoes, crewed mainly by Iroquois and Chippewa, delivered Richardson, Rae, and their personal equipment to Cumberland House on the Saskatchewan River on June 13. Travelling by canoe and portage, Richardson and Rae met the advance party at Methy Portage on June 28, continuing down the Slave River with them until mid-July, reaching Fort Resolution on Great Slave Lake, source of the Mackenzie River, on the 17th.

== Reaching the winter encampment ==
Continuing through areas populated by several native tribes, they passed the tree line on August 2. The party was occasionally encountered by groups of Inuit aboard kayak and umiak, and developed trading relations. These Inuit were interviewed but said they had not seen any Europeans or ships, even as far back as Rae's trip through the area during the Ross Expedition of 1826. They continued on, hunting as they went, past Franklin Bay and Cape Parry, where they first encountered drifting pack ice. Their progress slowed during the rest of the month, as wind, winter and ice often worked against them.

By the end of August, they had found a channel through the ice leading towards the Coppermine River, but the ice prevented them from reaching their autumn goal of Wollaston Land by water. Information gathering, trade and assistance continued through regular encounters with groups of Inuit. Continuing overland, they crossed the Richardson River in small groups using a portable Halkett boat on September 5.

As the travelling wore on, they discarded equipment to lighten their loads. By September 15, they reached the advanced party which had already begun construction of winter quarters, named Fort Confidence, and accumulation of winter stores. Here they passed the winter, periodically hunting, fishing and trading with the local Inuit to extend their rations. Throughout the winter Rae explored the lands between the Mackenzie and Coppermine Rivers. During December, the low temperature of −60 °F (−51 °C) was observed. By late May, the snow was melting and seasonal wildlife had begun to return.

== Rae's summer 1849 expedition ==
With only one boat available, it was decided that Rae should continue the search without Richardson's direct involvement. Rae began staging supply depots and advance hunters in April by dog sled. On June 7 Rae set out with a crew of six men, including two Cree Indians and an Inuk named Albert One-eye, to complete the exploration of the Coppermine River to the Arctic Ocean and the coasts of Wollaston and Victoria Lands in search of Franklin. Initial progress over the frozen Dease River was slowly made by sledge. They reached the open waters near Point Mackenzie on July 14 at 67°51'19"N.

Here they were visited by seven Inuit, who reported that the natives of Wollaston Land had not seen any Europeans, boats, or ships. On the 16th, they reached Back's Inlet, and spent three days with these Inuit hosts, mapping the region. Poor weather and ice slowed their progress along the coast, and they finally made camp at 68°24'35"N. until conditions permitted travel. They finally pushed off from the coast into ice-filled waters on August 19.

Although some halting progress was made through the pack ice, by the 23rd they resolved to abandon their goal of reaching Wollaston Land. The return to their base was difficult, and a portaging accident claimed the life of the Inuk, Albert, and their only boat at Bloody Falls, the only fatality during Rae's exploration. They continued back across land, reaching the Coppermine River on the 29th, returning to Fort Confidence two days later.

Concurrently, the same poor conditions prevented the expedition of Ross from reaching the Coppermine River from the north. The following summer, Rae left instructions to the local natives to prepare for a possible meeting with Ross in 1850.

== Richardson's return ==
Richardson's main party left Fort Confidence on May 7, a full month before Rae set out for Wollaston Land. Travel was primarily by boat, as the warming conditions did not support much sledging. They camped on the shores of Great Bear River for a month, awaiting a barge to ship their supplies. By June 8 they learned that the ice would not permit the barge to reach them, and the party set out on foot along the river.

By June 14, they had reached Fort Simpson, where they stayed until the 25th. They continued on through August and September, reaching Sault Ste. Marie on September 25, where a steam vessel provided further transport to Lake Huron. Richardson returned to Liverpool on November 6, 1849.

== Rae's continued search ==
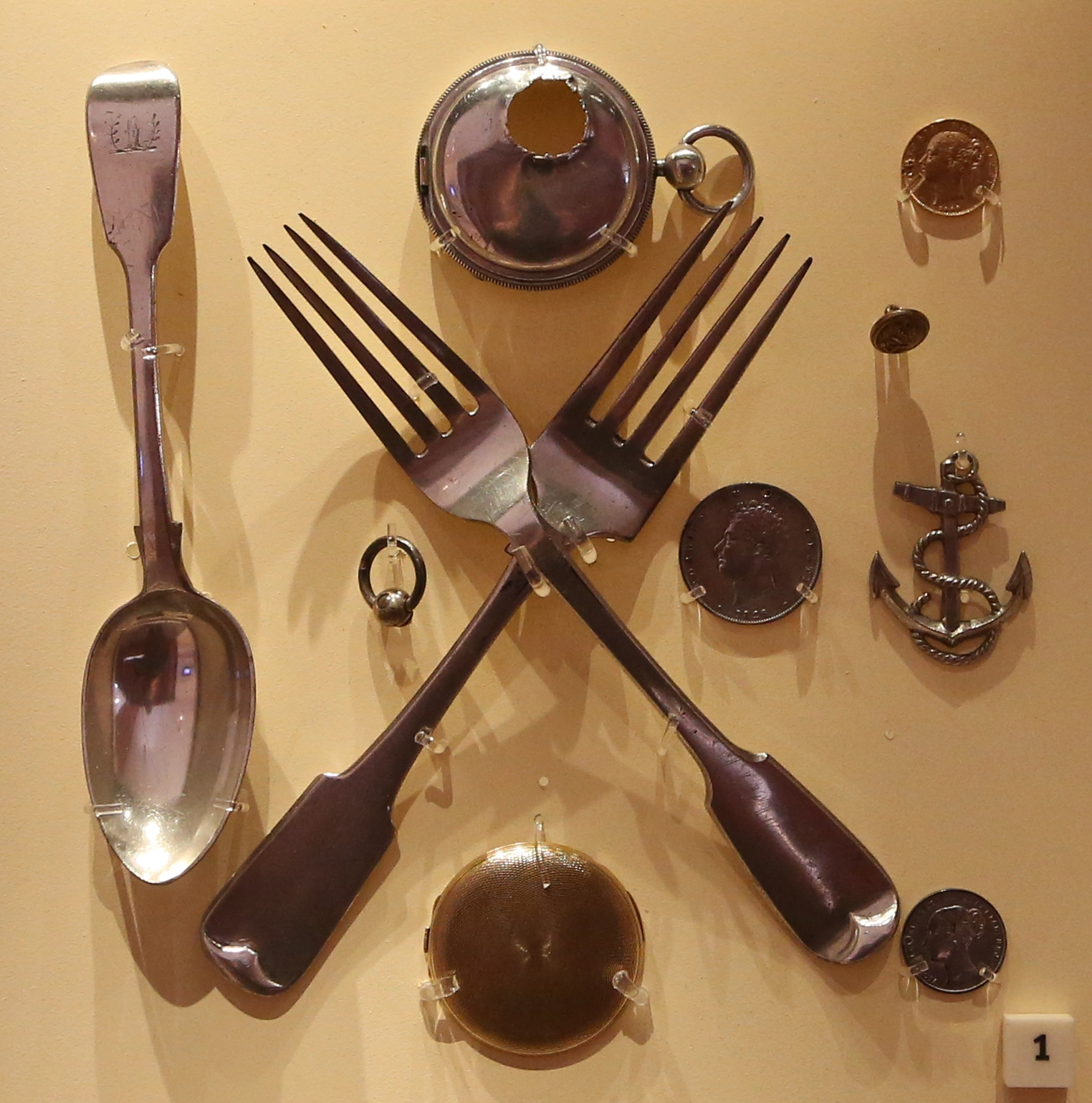
Some of the items purchased by Rae from the local Inuit

Rae continued his geographical survey and search for Franklin for the next several years on behalf of the Hudson's Bay Company, establishing a base at Fort Confidence on Great Bear Lake beginning in 1850.

In 1851 he left Fort Confidence, went down the Coppermine and explored the south shore of Victoria Island. During the harsh winters, they shared their scarce provisions with the local Inuit, strengthening the bonds of cooperation, and none of the expedition members perished. During these expeditions, Rae continued to interview the local natives, but none had any reports of possible knowledge of Franklin's expedition, and no material evidence was discovered.

In the spring of 1853, Rae returned to Back's Great Fish River, proceeding north-east from its mouth to extend the survey of Boothia. Here, he encountered Inuit in possession of objects he recognized as belonging to the Franklin expedition. Rae purchased as many of the objects as he could. Interviewing others in the area revealed that the Inuit had encountered the remnants of Franklin's crews in the spring of 1850.

== Franklin's fate ==
In July 1854, John Rae sent a communication from his quarters on Repulse Bay to the Secretary of the Admiralty:

"Repulse Bay, July 29.

SIR: – I have the honor to mention, for the information of my Lord's Commissioners of the Admiralty, that during my journey over the ice and snow this spring, with the view of completing the survey of the West shore of Boothia, I met with Esquimaux in the Pelly Bay, from one of whom I learned that a party of "white men" (Kablounans) had perished from want of food some distance to the westward, and not far beyond a large river containing many falls and rapids. Subsequently, further particulars were received, and a number of articles purchased, which place the fate of a portion, if not of all, of the then survivors of Sir John Franklin's long lost party beyond a doubt – a fate terrible as the imagination can conceive.

In the spring, four winters past, (spring, 1850,) a party of "white men," amounting to about forty, were seen travelling southward over the ice, and dragging a boat with them, by some Esquimaux, who were killing seals near the North shore of King William's Land, which is a large island. None of the party could speak the Esquimaux language intelligibly, but by the signs of the natives were made to understand that their ship or ships, had been crushed by the ice, and that they were now going to where they expected to find deer to shoot. From the appearance of the men, all of whom, except one officer, looked thin, they were then supposed to be getting short of provisions, and purchased a small seal from the natives. At a later date the same season, but previous to the breaking up of the ice, the bodies of some thirty persons were discovered on the continent, and five on an island near it, about a long day's journey to the N. W. of a large stream, which can be no other than Back's Great Fish River, (named by the Esquimaux Doot-ko-hi-calik,) as its description, and that of the low shore in the neighborhood of Point Ogle and Montreal Island, agree exactly with that of Sir George Back. Some of the bodies had been buried, (probably those of the first victims of famine,) some were in a tent or tents, others under the boat, which had been turned over to form a shelter, and several lay scattered about in different directions. Of those found on the island one was supposed to have been an officer, as he had a telescope strapped over his shoulders, and his double-barrelled gun lay underneath him.

From the mutilated state of many of the corpses and the contents of the kettles, it is evident that our wretched countrymen had been driven to the last resource – cannibalism – as a means of prolonging existence.

There appeared to have been an abundant stock of ammunition, as the powder was emptied in a heap on the ground by the natives, out of the kegs or cases containing it; and a quantity of ball and shot was found below high-water mark, having probably been left on the ice close to the beach. There must have been a number of watches, compasses, telescopes, guns (several doubled barrelled,) &c., all of which appear to have been broken up, as I saw pieces of those different articles with the Esquimaux together with some silver spoons and forks. I purchased as many as I could get. A list of the most important of these I enclose, with a rough sketch of the crest and initials of the forks and spoons. These articles themselves shall be handed over to the Secretary of the Hudson's Bay Company on my arrival in London.

None of the Esquimaux with whom I conversed had seen the "whites," nor had they ever been at the place where the bodies were found, but had their information from those who had been there, and who had seen the party when travelling.

I offer no apology for taking the liberty of addressing you, as I do so from a belief that their Lordships would be desirous of being put in possession at as early date as possible of any tidings, however meagre and unexpectedly obtained, regarding this painfully interesting subject.

I may add that, by means of our guns and nets, we obtained an ample supply of provisions last autumn, and my small party passed the winter in snow houses in comparative comfort, the skins of the deer shot affording abundant warm clothing and bedding. My spring journey was a failure, in consequence of an accumulation of obstacles, several of which my former experience in Arctic travelling had not taught me to expect. I have &c.,

JOHN RAE, C.F.,

Commanding Hudson's Bay Company's Arctic Expedition."

Rae subsequently abandoned the task of completing the charting of the area, instead focusing on responding to the communications of those interested in Franklin's fate. He returned to England on October 22 to find the Admiralty had released his private communication to the press. Published in the London Times on October 23, it aroused considerable public distress and anger.

== Legacy ==
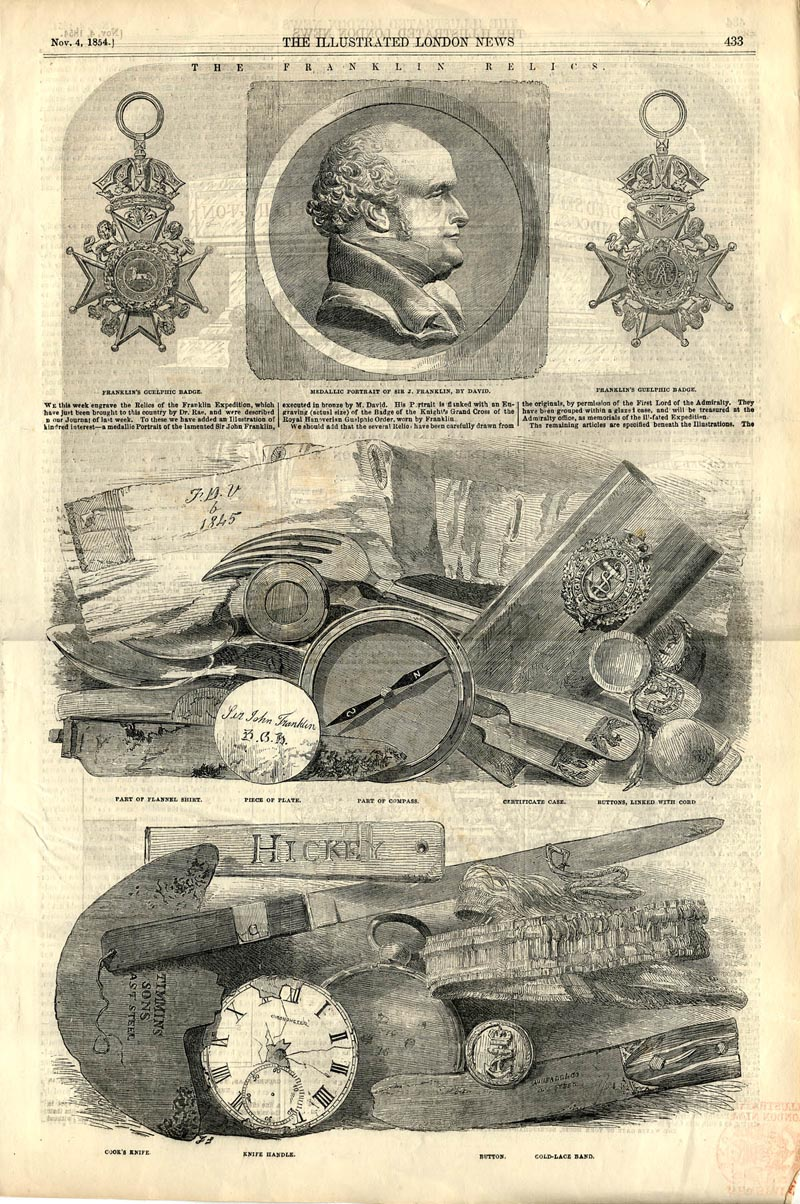
Relics of Franklin's 1845 expedition obtained by Rae

In addition to establishing the final fate of Franklin's lost expedition, Rae completed an extensive survey of the west coast of Boothia, and proved once and for all that King William's Land was in fact an island. His furthest northward penetration near Cape Porter was set at 70° 5' N.

Rae's assertion of cannibalism was sufficiently unpleasant to cause him to be spurned publicly by Charles Dickens on behalf of Franklin's widow. Responding only a week after the details were published, Dickens rejected the reliability of the Inuit testimony, which led to a series of seven articles between Dickens, Rae and Henry Morley debating the matter.

Other searchers for Franklin were granted knighthoods for their service, but Rae was not. Ultimately, he did collect a £10,000 reward for resolving the Franklin question, but by then he had been largely omitted from the picture, to be largely forgotten by history. Despite the fact that Francis Leopold McClintock located skeletal evidence on King William Island that supported Rae's account, he was never forgiven for delivering the bad news. Rae retired from exploration a short time later, and ultimately his contributions as an explorer were recognized when he was elected a fellow of the Royal Society in 1880.

Several locations in Canada were named for Rae, including Rae Strait (between King William Island and the Boothia Peninsula), Rae Isthmus, and Rae River, in Nunavut; Mount Rae, in the Canadian Rockies of Alberta; and Fort Rae and the village of Rae-Edzo (now Behchokǫ̀), in the Northwest Territories.
