= Elder Island =

Island in Nunavut, Canada

- Location within Nunavut Location within Canada

Geography
- Location: Fury and Hecla Strait
- Coordinates: 69°50′N 82°32′W
- Archipelago: Arctic Archipelago

Administration
- Canada
- Territory: Nunavut
- Region: Qikiqtaaluk

Demographics
- Population: Uninhabited

Elder Island is an irregularly shaped island located at the eastern opening of the Fury and Hecla Strait. Situated in Nunavut's Qikiqtaaluk Region within the northern Canadian Arctic, the island is north of the Melville Peninsula and Ormonde Island. It is approximately 1 km (0.62 mi) south of Baffin Island (separated by Adolf Jensen Sound), while the Foxe Basin is to the east.
