= Saglirjuaq =

Uninhabited island in the Qikiqtaaluk Region, Nunavut, Canada

- Location within Nunavut Location within Canada

Geography
- Location: Fury and Hecla Strait
- Coordinates: 69°46′09″N 83°08′37″W
- Archipelago: Arctic Archipelago

Administration
- Canada
- Territory: Nunavut
- Region: Qikiqtaaluk

Demographics
- Population: Uninhabited

Saglirjuaq (Inuktitut syllabics: ᓴᒡᓕᕐᔪᐊᖅ) formerly Liddon Island is one of several irregularly shaped islands located in the Fury and Hecla Strait of Nunavut's Qikiqtaaluk Region within the northern Canadian Arctic. It is north of the mainland's Melville Peninsula, south of Baffin Island's Sikosak Bay, west of Simialuk, and east of Saglaarjuk.

It was given its European name for Lieutenant Matthew Liddon, an officer who accompanied Sir William Edward Parry during his search for the Northwest Passage 1819–1820. During that voyage, rock crystal, common iron glance, and red iron ore were discovered on the island.
