= Helen Island =

Uninhabited island in Nunavut, Canada

- Location within Nunavut Location within Canada

Geography
- Location: Gulf of Boothia
- Coordinates: 68°45′N 089°55′W
- Archipelago: Canadian Arctic Archipelago

Administration
- Canada
- Territory: Nunavut
- Region: Kitikmeot

Demographics
- Population: Uninhabited

Helen Island is an uninhabited island in Nunavut, Canada. It is located in the Kitikmeot Region's side of the Gulf of Boothia. It is situated west of the mainland's Simpson Peninsula, between Pelly Bay and Login Bay.
