= Glen Island =

Island in Nunavut, Canada

- Interactive map of Glen Island

Geography
- Location: Gulf of Boothia
- Coordinates: 68°24′N 85°47′W
- Archipelago: Arctic Archipelago

Administration
- Canada
- Territory: Nunavut
- Region: Qikiqtaaluk

Demographics
- Population: Uninhabited

Glen Island is an island in Nunavut, Canada. It is located in the Qikiqtaaluk Region's side of the Gulf of Boothia within Committee Bay. It is northeast of Wales Island and west of the mainland's Melville Peninsula.
