= Wales Island (Nunavut) =

Uninhabited island of Nunavut, Canada

Wales
Native name: Shartoo
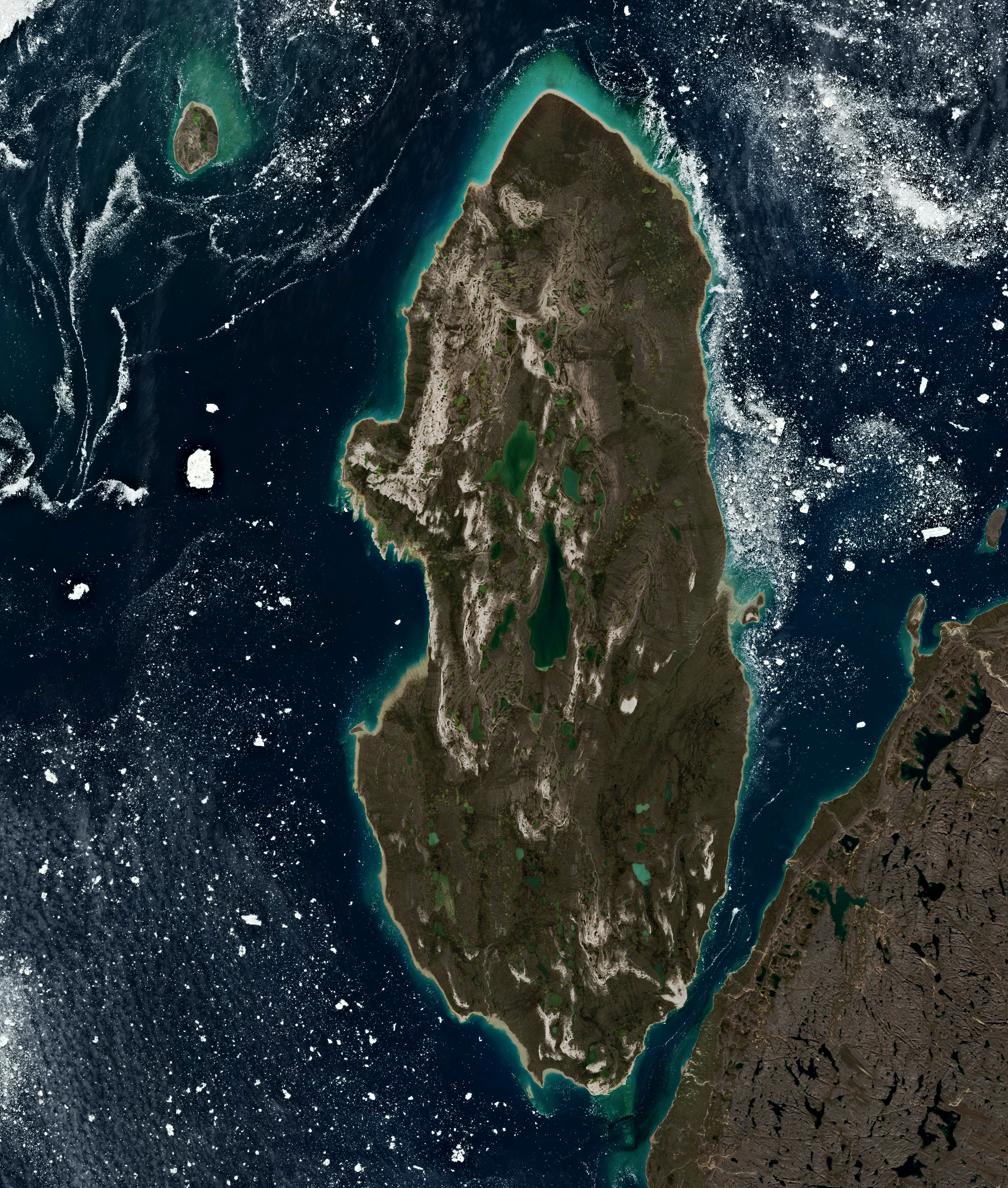
- Sentinel-2 image (2020)

- Location within Nunavut Location within Canada

Geography
- Location: Gulf of Boothia's Committee Bay
- Coordinates: 68°01′N 86°40′W
- Archipelago: Arctic Archipelago
- Area: 1,176.81 km^{2} (454.37 sq mi) (2026)
- Area rank: 44th in Canada & 296th worldwide

Administration
- Canada
- Territory: Nunavut
- Region: Qikiqtaaluk

Demographics
- Population: 0

Wales Island (Note: Inuktitut: Shatook) is an uninhabited island in the Arctic Archipelago. Part of the Qikiqtaaluk Region of Nunavut, located 1.5 km (0.93 mi) off the Melville Peninsula, the island is situated in Committee Bay within the western Gulf of Boothia. It has an area of 11,176.81 km^{2} (4,315.39 sq mi). Named Prince of Wales Island by the Scottish Arctic explorer, Dr. John Rae, it was subsequently shortened to Wales Island.
