= Committee Bay =

Arctic waterway in Nunavut, Canada

- Location within Nunavut
- Location: Gulf of Boothia
- Coordinates: 68°16′N 86°54′W
- Ocean/sea sources: Arctic Ocean
- Basin countries: Canada
- Settlements: Uninhabited

Committee Bay (referred to as Nattiligaarjuk (Inuktitut: ᓇᑦᑎᓕᒑᕐᔪᒃ) by Inuit) is an Arctic waterway in both the Kitikmeot Region and the Qikiqtaaluk Region, Nunavut, Canada. It forms the southeast end of the Gulf of Boothia and is bounded on the east by the Melville Peninsula, and to the northwest by the Simpson Peninsula. Wales Island lies within the bay. The first European to explore the area was John Rae in 1846 - 1847.
