= Susanna Island =

Island in Nunavut, Canada

- Location within Nunavut Location within Canada

Geography
- Location: Gulf of Boothia
- Coordinates: 70°29′N 091°57′W
- Archipelago: Arctic Archipelago

Administration
- Canada
- Territory: Nunavut
- Region: Kitikmeot

Demographics
- Population: Uninhabited

Susanna Island is an island located in Nunavut's Kitikmeot Region within the northern Canadian Arctic. It is in eastern Gulf of Boothia near the mainland's Boothia Peninsula, and 8.5 km (5.3 mi) southeast of the larger Pouncet Island.
