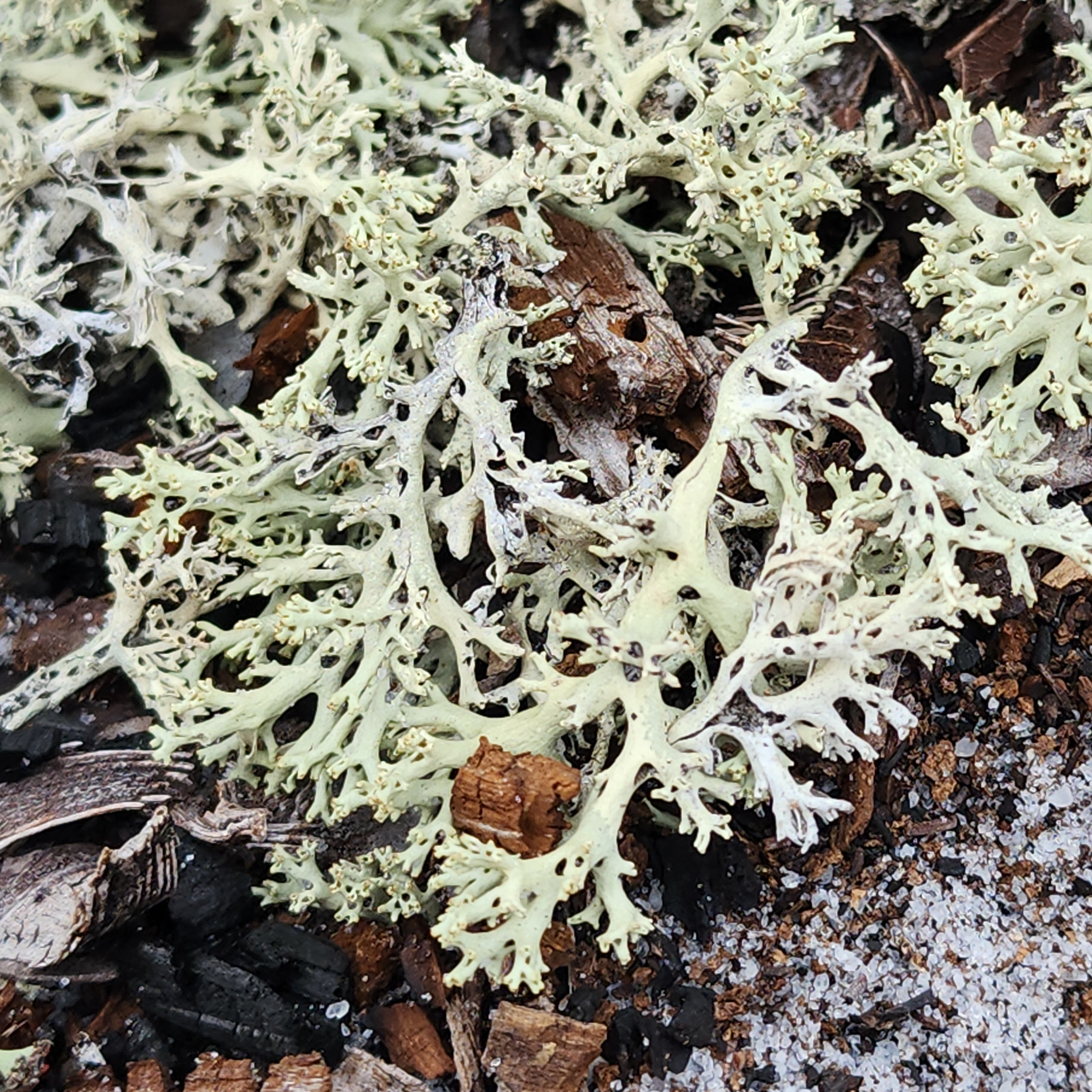
- Growing in open-canopy rosemary scrub

Conservation status
- Endangered (IUCN 3.1)

- Imperiled (NatureServe)

Scientific classification
- Kingdom: Fungi
- Division: Ascomycota
- Class: Lecanoromycetes
- Order: Lecanorales
- Family: Cladoniaceae
- Genus: Cladonia
- Species: C. perforata

Binomial name
- Cladonia perforata A.Evans (1952)

= Cladonia perforata =

Species of lichen-forming fungus

Cladonia perforata is a rare species of lichen known as Florida perforate cladonia and Florida perforate reindeer lichen. It is endemic to the state of Florida in the United States, where it is known from 16 populations in four widely separated areas of the state. It is native to a very specific type of Florida scrub habitat which is increasingly rare and patchy due to habitat destruction, degradation, and fragmentation. In 1993 this was the first species of lichen to be federally listed as an endangered species of the United States.

== Taxonomy ==
Cladonia perforata was first described by Alexander William Evans in 1952. Ann Buckley and Theodore Hendrickson noted that the type material was based on a specimen collected in 1945 by George Llano at Eglin Air Force Base on Santa Rosa Island in Escambia County, Florida. In their 1988 account, they treated the lichen as an unusual white-sand species within the genus and as a readily recognizable member of the Florida scrub lichen flora, distinguishing it from other ground-dwelling Cladonia species by its thick podetia with broad, conspicuous perforations.

== Description ==
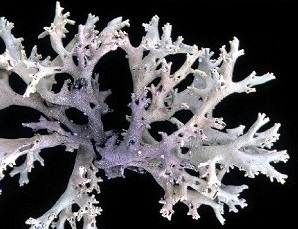
Form

This lichen is relatively large, its yellow-gray, slightly glossy fruiting body measuring up to 6 centimeters (2.4 in) in length. The fruiting body, the visible part of the lichen, is a branching, tufted structure. The branches, or podetia, are lined with hyphae on their inner surfaces and are perforated with tiny holes. It and similar species undergo vegetative reproduction in which it clones by physically breaking up and spreading. No sexual reproduction has been observed. The lichen's method of biological dispersal is to have its fragments swept or blown to new locations.

In general, this species is poorly known. Little information is available about its life history, including its precise reproductive cycle, growth, population dynamics, or any seasonal changes it might experience.

== Distribution and habitat ==
The habitat of this species is the white sand of the Florida scrub, already a rare and endangered type of ecosystem, and the lichen requires a specific spot within the habitat. It can be found on high dunes and ridges among sand pines (Pinus clausa) in the part of the scrub understory called "rosemary balds": land dominated by Florida rosemary (Ceratiola ericoides). The lichen occurs in very dry, open sites on sand with little plant cover around it. It can often be found tangled up in clumps with other species of lichen.

It is difficult to estimate the abundance of this species. Much of the current data is outdated. The organism in question is often small and sometimes hard to spot on the ground or in the leaf litter. Furthermore, what constitutes one individual organism is not always apparent; one living lichen may be several centimeters long or just a tiny fragment. Populations fluctuate often, occurrences are destroyed, and several new ones have been discovered and rediscovered in recent years. The species was first discovered in 1945 by George A. Llano on Eglin Air Force Base property on Santa Rosa Island near Pensacola. This, the lichen's type locality, was later paved and the population presumably destroyed. A population was rediscovered in this area of the Florida Panhandle in 1989. The species has a disjunct distribution: the other populations are located on the east and west coasts of the main peninsula of Florida.

== Conservation ==
Threats to this species include development of its habitat for residential, agricultural, and commercial use, pollution and trash dumping, off-road vehicle use, trampling and crushing by people, animals, and vehicles, and severe storms and wildfires. Natural processes such as hurricanes and fires are necessary for maintaining habitat such as Florida scrub, but these events do kill the lichen by burning it, crushing it to small pieces, sweeping it away in storm surges, or burying it in sand. Hurricane Opal in 1995, for example, destroyed at least two known occurrences of the lichen. Lichen rescue operations are sometimes performed in the days after a hurricane in an effort to unbury individuals from sand and debris, and even pluck them out of trees where they have landed. Some individuals are collected on beds of sand and brought indoors when storms are expected. Even if the lichen itself is undamaged in a storm, parts of its rare, limited potential habitat may be rendered unsuitable by disturbances.

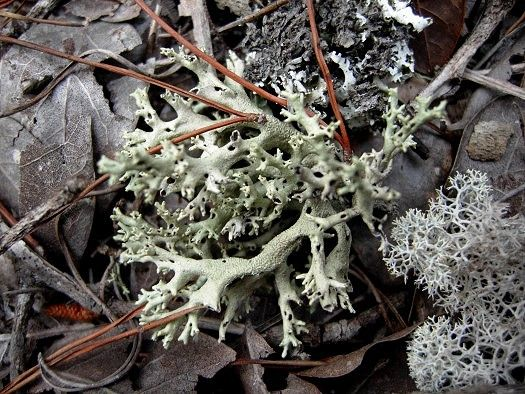
Persisting in fire-suppressed habitat

The lichen is also vulnerable because it is slow-growing, slow to recover after mortality, inefficient in its dispersal, and already rare with unstable populations. Its patchy, fragmented distribution makes it likely to experience isolation and extirpation of small populations. Since most populations are just clusters of clones, each population is extremely valuable in the conservation of the species. The populations occur in North, Central, and South Florida, and can be separated by hundreds of miles; gene flow between them is often highly unlikely.

New populations have been reintroduced to appropriate habitat where the species has been observed before. Many populations are located in areas that are protected from development and fragmentation. At last review the species was still considered endangered.

== See also ==
- List of Cladonia species
