= Kugaaruk =

Kugaaruk ᑰᒑᕐᔪᒃ
- Hamlet
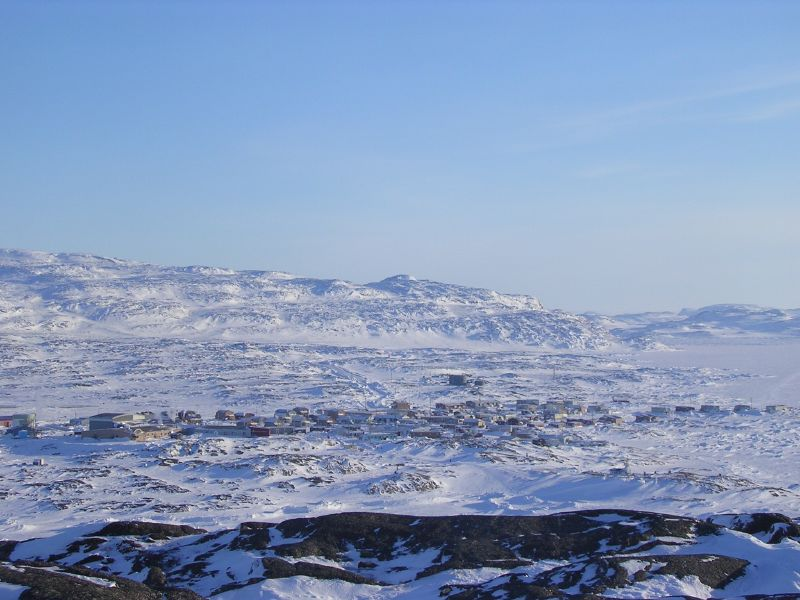
- Overlooking the community

- Location within Nunavut Location within Canada
- Coordinates: 68°32′05″N 089°49′30″W
- Country: Canada
- Territory: Nunavut
- Region: Kitikmeot
- Electoral district: Netsilik
- Catholic mission: 1937

Government
  - Mayor: Teddy Apsaktaun
  - MLA: Cecile Nelvana Lyall

Area (2021)
  - Total: 5.06 km^{2} (1.95 sq mi)
- Elevation: 17 m (56 ft)

Population (2021)
  - Total: 1,033
  - Density: 204.2/km^{2} (529/sq mi)
- Time zone: UTC−07:00 (MST)
  - Summer (DST): UTC−06:00 (MDT)
- Canadian Postal code: X0B 1K0
- Area code: 867

Kugaaruk (Inuktitut syllabics: ᑰᒑᕐᔪᒃ Kuugaarjuk or ᑰᒑᕐᕈᒃ Kuugaarruk; English: "little stream") (also called Arviligjuaqy, meaning "the great bowhead whale habitat"), formerly known as Pelly Bay until 3 December 1999, is located on the shore of Pelly Bay, just off the Gulf of Boothia, Simpson Peninsula, Kitikmeot, in Canada's Nunavut territory. Access is by air at the Kugaaruk Airport, by annual supply sealift, and by sea ice. Kugaaruk means "little stream", the traditional name of the brook that flows through the hamlet.

Near the hamlet is CAM-4, a North Warning System site that was once part of the Distant Early Warning Line.

== Demographics ==
Federal census population history of Kugaaruk
Year	Pop.	±%
1971	210	—
1976	246	+17.1%
1981	257	+4.5%
1986	297	+15.6%
1991	409	+37.7%
1996	496	+21.3%
2001	605	+22.0%
2006	688	+13.7%
2011	771	+12.1%
2016	933	+21.0%
2021	1,033	+10.7%
Source: Statistics Canada

In the 2021 Canadian census conducted by Statistics Canada, Kugaaruk had a population of 1,033 living in 214 of its 225 total private dwellings, a change of 10.7% from its 2016 population of 933. With a land area of 5.06 km^{2} (1.95 sq mi), it had a population density of 204.2/km^{2} (528.7/sq mi) in 2021.

== Culture ==
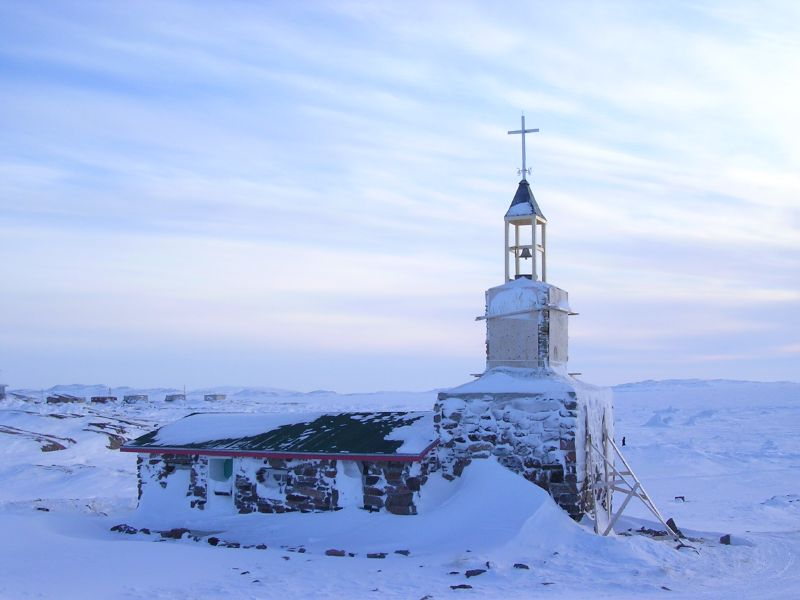
Stone church in Kugaaruk

The historical inhabitants were Arviligjuarmiut. Kugaaruk is a traditional Central Inuit community. Until 1968, the people followed a nomadic lifestyle. The population is approximately 97% Inuit and most people self-identify as Netsilik. The residents blend a land based lifestyle with modern technology and interests. Most families supplement their diet with ringed seal, caribou, and Arctic char. Other wildlife includes narwhal, beluga, bowhead whale, polar bears, wolverine and peregrine falcons. Despite the isolation of the community, the traditional language, Inuktitut, is declining. Most people 30 and over speak Inuktitut as their first language, but the language is not being passed on to their children. In most households, a mixture of English and Inuktitut is spoken. Children understand their parents and grandparents, but respond to them in English. One goal of the Nunavut educational system is to encourage and spread the use of Inuktitut.

There are a few Inuit artists in Kugaaruk, including the world-renowned Emily Illuitok, (1943-2012), who worked mostly in walrus ivory and bone; and Nick Sikkuark, whose works are mainly in whale bone, caribou antler, and walrus ivory, and are characterized by "droll, macabre wit".

Most women sew traditional parkas, amautiit (baby carrying parkas), and kamik (seal or caribou skin boots).

== Kugaardjuq School ==
Kugaardjuq School includes kindergarten to grade 12. It is very modern and includes a large south facing library, computer lab, gymnasium and science lab. Currently there are two language specialists who teach Natsilingmiutut, while the rest of the staff are southern teachers. In 2010 many of the Nunavut Teacher Education Program (NTEP) graduates, who are locals, were to become teachers in levels from kindergarten to grade 7. As the only outsiders in the community are government workers, the student population is almost entirely Inuit.

All high schools in Nunavut use the Alberta educational curriculum. However, one challenge faced by educators in this community is that most students read at about 3 or 4 grade levels lower than their Albertan counterparts (as of 2007). As with most schools in Nunavut, the school is under the partial authority of the locally elected District Education Authority (DEA), who design policy as well as make decisions regarding discipline, spending, and cultural activities.

Kugaaruk was involved in the Mississauga YMCA exchange in 2007. Fifteen children from Kugaaruk made their way to Mississauga with three teachers for seven days. Then 15 people from Mississauga travelled to Kugaaruk for 11 days to experience the land and culture. Sites visited in Ontario included the CN Tower, the Hockey Hall of Fame, Queen's Park, Square One Shopping Centre, MuchMusic, Niagara Falls, Great Wolf Lodge, and the two exchange schools: Clarkson Secondary, and Hillside Senior Public School.

On 28 February 2017, the school caught on fire, described as "suspicious". Most of the school burned down, the gym, reception area and high school portion were all completely destroyed, and the elementary portion was damaged. The replacement cost was provisionally estimated between $25 and $30 million.

== Broadband communications ==
The community has been served by the Qiniq network since 2005. This is a fixed wireless service to homes and businesses, connecting to the outside world via a satellite backbone. The Qiniq network is designed and operated by SSi Canada. In 2017, the network was upgraded to 4G LTE technology, and 2G-GSM for mobile voice.

== Climate ==
Kugaaruk is the location of the lowest wind chill ever recorded in Canada, of −79 on 13 January 1975.

On 16 February 2018, the Human Weather Observation System (HWOS), a type of semi-automated weather observing system, reported an unreviewed new minimum temperature for the month of February at −51.9 °C (−61.4 °F) at 06:00 MST. It beat the previous record of −51.5 °C (−60.7 °F) that was set 28 January 1989.

Kugaaruk has a tundra climate (Köppen: ETf) with short but cool summers and long cold winters.

Climate data for Kugaaruk (Kugaaruk Airport) Climate ID: 2303092; coordinates 68°32′26″N 89°47′50″W; elevation: 15.5 m (51 ft); 1991–2020 normals, extremes 1984–present
Month	Jan	Feb	Mar	Apr	May	Jun	Jul	Aug	Sep	Oct	Nov	Dec	Year
Record high humidex	−2.3	−9.9	−3.5	1.4	9.8	25.9	29.4	26.4	18.4	5.6	−0.5	−1.6	29.4
Record high °C (°F)	−2.0 (28.4)	−10.0 (14.0)	−3.5 (25.7)	1.8 (35.2)	10.2 (50.4)	26.0 (78.8)	27.5 (81.5)	29.0 (84.2)	18.5 (65.3)	8.0 (46.4)	0.0 (32.0)	−1.4 (29.5)	29.0 (84.2)
Mean daily maximum °C (°F)	−28.1 (−18.6)	−29.1 (−20.4)	−24.2 (−11.6)	−14.5 (5.9)	−4.0 (24.8)	6.4 (43.5)	14.4 (57.9)	10.9 (51.6)	3.1 (37.6)	−5.0 (23.0)	−16.1 (3.0)	−23.3 (−9.9)	−9.1 (15.6)
Daily mean °C (°F)	−31.8 (−25.2)	−32.8 (−27.0)	−28.7 (−19.7)	−19.4 (−2.9)	−7.7 (18.1)	3.1 (37.6)	9.8 (49.6)	7.1 (44.8)	0.7 (33.3)	−8.0 (17.6)	−19.8 (−3.6)	−27.1 (−16.8)	−12.9 (8.8)
Mean daily minimum °C (°F)	−35.5 (−31.9)	−36.5 (−33.7)	−33.1 (−27.6)	−24.1 (−11.4)	−11.3 (11.7)	−0.1 (31.8)	5.2 (41.4)	3.3 (37.9)	−1.7 (28.9)	−10.8 (12.6)	−23.5 (−10.3)	−30.9 (−23.6)	−16.6 (2.1)
Record low °C (°F)	−51.5 (−60.7)	−51.8 (−61.2)	−51.0 (−59.8)	−44.5 (−48.1)	−32.0 (−25.6)	−15.2 (4.6)	−1.9 (28.6)	−5.0 (23.0)	−15.7 (3.7)	−31.0 (−23.8)	−42.3 (−44.1)	−48.5 (−55.3)	−51.8 (−61.2)
Record low wind chill	−79.0	−68.2	−63.4	−53.5	−40.1	−24.8	−6.3	−8.9	−19.8	−44.3	−53.1	−60.2	−79.0
Average precipitation mm (inches)	8.3 (0.33)	7.0 (0.28)	13.8 (0.54)	17.1 (0.67)	11.8 (0.46)	23.4 (0.92)	37.9 (1.49)	43.8 (1.72)	28.1 (1.11)	23.5 (0.93)	12.8 (0.50)	12.5 (0.49)	239.9 (9.44)
Average rainfall mm (inches)	0.0 (0.0)	0.0 (0.0)	0.0 (0.0)	0.0 (0.0)	0.8 (0.03)	20.7 (0.81)	39.7 (1.56)	46.1 (1.81)	17.2 (0.68)	1.1 (0.04)	0.0 (0.0)	0.0 (0.0)	125.5 (4.94)
Average snowfall cm (inches)	9.4 (3.7)	7.8 (3.1)	16.7 (6.6)	18.3 (7.2)	14.8 (5.8)	4.1 (1.6)	0.0 (0.0)	1.3 (0.5)	14.2 (5.6)	26.5 (10.4)	17.5 (6.9)	14.9 (5.9)	145.5 (57.3)
Average precipitation days (≥ 0.2 mm)	9.4	7.4	9.7	9.4	8.6	9.6	10.8	13.0	14.5	15.4	11.2	9.9	128.7
Average rainy days (≥ 0.2 mm)	0.0	0.0	0.0	0.0	0.65	6.9	10.2	13.2	7.2	0.50	0.0	0.0	38.7
Average snowy days (≥ 0.2 cm)	7.6	6.1	8.1	7.4	7.7	1.8	0.0	0.47	7.8	14.5	10.8	7.8	79.8
Average relative humidity (%) (at 1500 LST)	72.7	78.1	73.2	80.8	82.9	77.3	66.4	72.0	81.2	85.0	79.0	78.4	77.2
Source: Environment and Climate Change Canada (humidity 1981–2010)

== History ==
First contact between Europeans and the local Inuit occurred in 1829.

During colonization, Kugaaruk was named Pelly Bay after the bay on which it sits. Pelly Bay is named after Sir John Pelly, governor of the Hudson's Bay Company, company operating the British North American territory of Rupert's Land in which it was located when it was so named.

In 1854, Scottish explorer John Rae interviewed Inuit at Pelly Bay, to document some details of a camp of the lost expedition of John Franklin that they had discovered.

In 1935 Father Pierre Henry established a Roman Catholic mission at Pelly Bay. The mission changed status to being a permanent mission in 1937, with the arrival of Father Franz van de Velde. A stone church was built in 1941.

In 1955, the Pelly Bay DEW Line Station was built near the hamlet, making the traditional campsite of nomadic Inuit into a permanent settlement.

In 1968, the local airport was built, and the Canadian government imported prefab housing to build out the town site.

In 1972 the hamlet was incorporated as "Pelly Bay".

In 1999 the hamlet's official name was changed to Kugaaruk.

== Economy and services ==
- Koomiut Co-op, member of the Arctic Co-operatives Limited and home to the post office
- Koomiut Coffee Shop
- Inukshuk Inns North, operated by the Koomiut Co-op and named after the English translation of inuksuk
- Northern Store, part of The North West Company
- Royal Canadian Mounted Police detachment

== See also ==
- List of municipalities in Nunavut
- John Ningark

== Sources ==
- Bennett, John, and Susan Diana Mary Rowley. Uqalurait An Oral History of Nunavut. McGill-Queen's native and northern series, 36. Montreal: MQUP, 2004. ISBN 0-7735-2340-5
