= Glen Island (disambiguation) =

Glen Island is an island in Nunavut, Canada.

Glen Island may also refer to:

- Glen Island (Thames), land between the head of the Jubilee River and the River Thames, England
- Glen Island Park, in New Rochelle, New York, United States.
