= Pouncet Island =

Island in Nunavut, Canada

- Location within Nunavut Location within Canada

Geography
- Location: Gulf of Boothia
- Coordinates: 70°32′N 92°0′W
- Archipelago: Arctic Archipelago

Administration
- Canada
- Territory: Nunavut
- Region: Qikiqtaaluk

Demographics
- Population: Uninhabited

Pouncet Island is an island located in Nunavut's Kitikmeot Region within the northern Canadian Arctic. It is in the western Gulf of Boothia, near the mainland's Boothia Peninsula, and 8.5 km (5.3 mi) northwest of the smaller Susanna Island.
