= Sabina Qunqnirq Anaittuq =

Inuk artist

- Born: 1941
- Died: 1997 (aged 55–56)

Sabina Qunqnirq Anaittuq (1941–1997) was an Inuk artist from the Kugaaruk community. Her work is primarily in small carvings in ivory and bone.

Her work is included in the collections of the Musée national des beaux-arts du Québec, the National Gallery of Canada, the Museum of Anthropology at UBC and the Winnipeg Art Gallery. Her work has been included in over a dozen exhibitions including the Small Worlds: Inuit Miniature Carving exhibit at the Winnipeg Art Gallery.
