= Saglaarjuk =

Island in Nunavut, Canada

- Location within Nunavut Location within Canada

Geography
- Location: Northern Canada
- Coordinates: 69°46′54″N 083°44′47″W
- Archipelago: Arctic Archipelago

Administration
- Canada
- Territory: Nunavut
- Region: Qikiqtaaluk

Demographics
- Population: Uninhabited

Saglaarjuk (Inuktitut syllabicsᓴᒡᓛᕐᔪᒃ) formerly Amherst Island is one of several uninhabited, irregularly shaped Arctic islands. It is located on the south side of the Fury and Hecla Strait in the Qikiqtaaluk Region of Nunavut Lying within northern Canada it is west of Saglirjuaq, previously Liddon Island, north of Grinnell Lake on the mainland's Melville Peninsula, and south of Baffin Island.

The island was, at one time, named for Jeffery Amherst, 1st Baron Amherst, a British Army officer who commanded forces that captured the Fortress of Louisbourg during the 1758 siege from the French and later became the Commander-in-Chief, North America and the Governor of the Province of Quebec.

As part of the Arctic Archipelago, it was held by the British as part of the British Arctic Territories until 1880.
