= Astronomical Society Islands =

Island group in Nunavut, Canada

- Location within Nunavut Location within Canada

Geography
- Location: Gulf of Boothia
- Coordinates: 69°50′N 091°34′W
- Archipelago: Arctic Archipelago
- Area: 139 km^{2} (54 sq mi)

Administration
- Canada
- Territory: Nunavut
- Region: Kitikmeot

Demographics
- Population: Uninhabited

The Astronomical Society Islands are members of the Arctic Archipelago in the Canadian territory of Nunavut. They are located in western Gulf of Boothia at the mouth of Lord Mayor Bay. The group is near the Boothia Peninsula and south of the Copeland Islands. The waters surrounding the archipelago have been used for hunting polar bears and walrus.

== History ==
The islands were named for the Royal Astronomical Society of Canada in 1910.

In 2018, the research vessel Akademik Ioffe ran aground west of the islands.
