= Halkett boat =

Inflatable boat designed by Lt. Peter Halkett

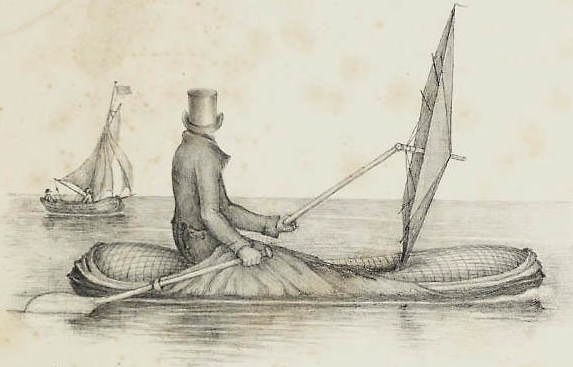
A Halkett boat-cloak in use

A Halkett boat is a type of lightweight inflatable boat designed by Lt Peter Halkett (1820–1885) during the 1840s. Halkett had long been interested in the difficulties of travelling in the Canadian Arctic, and the problems involved in designing boats light enough to be carried over arduous terrain, but robust enough to be used in extreme weather conditions.

Halkett's first design was a collapsible and inflatable boat made of rubber-impregnated cloth. When deflated, the hull of the boat could be worn as a cloak, the oar used as a walking stick, and the sail as an umbrella. This was followed by a two-man craft that was small enough to fit into a knapsack, and when deflated served as a waterproof blanket.

Although widely praised by Canadian explorers, Halkett's designs had a limited market, and he was unable to persuade the Royal Navy that they would serve any useful purpose in general naval service. Efforts to market them as platforms for fishing and duck shooting failed, and they were commercially unsuccessful. Only two Halkett boats, that of Orcadian explorer John Rae and one held in the Hudson's Bay Company Museum Collection at the Manitoba Museum, are known to survive today.

== Peter Halkett ==
Peter Halkett was a lieutenant in the Royal Navy in the 1840s. The son of John Halkett, a director of the Hudson's Bay Company who for many years had lived in Canada before returning to England, Peter Halkett had long held an interest in the exploration of the Canadian Arctic. He had a particular interest in John Franklin's disastrous Coppermine Expedition of 1819–1822.

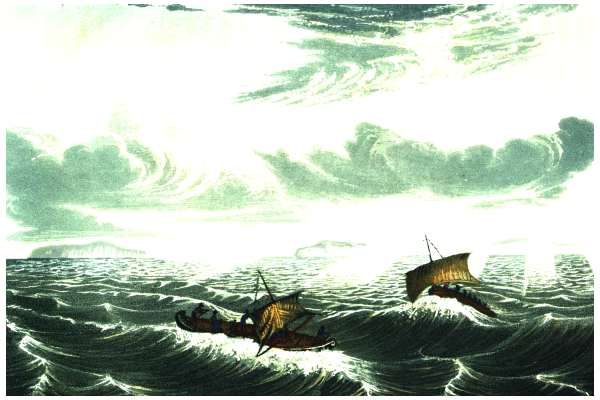
The destruction of John Franklin's canoes in a storm inspired Halkett to search for more robust and portable alternatives to traditional wooden boats.

Franklin's three-year exploration of the northern coast of Canada in search of the Northwest Passage had ended in disaster amid accusations of murder and cannibalism, with 11 of the 20 members of the group killed and the survivors reduced to eating lichen, their own boots, and the remains of rotten carcasses abandoned by wolves. The party had become stranded on the wrong side of the Coppermine River after their boats had been destroyed in a storm; John Richardson had attempted to swim to safety and suffered severe hypothermia. A single member of the party had fashioned a small canoe from canvas and willow, and the survivors had been obliged to cross the river one at a time using the makeshift canoe.

Halkett was an amateur inventor, and during his spare time whilst serving in the navy he worked on solving the problem of how to design a boat that would be small and light enough to transport easily on foot through wilderness, but robust enough to carry people in safety across wide bodies of water. His solution was to design a boat in which all components would double as items of clothing, or accessories that Halkett assumed the user would be carrying in any event.

== Boat-cloak ==
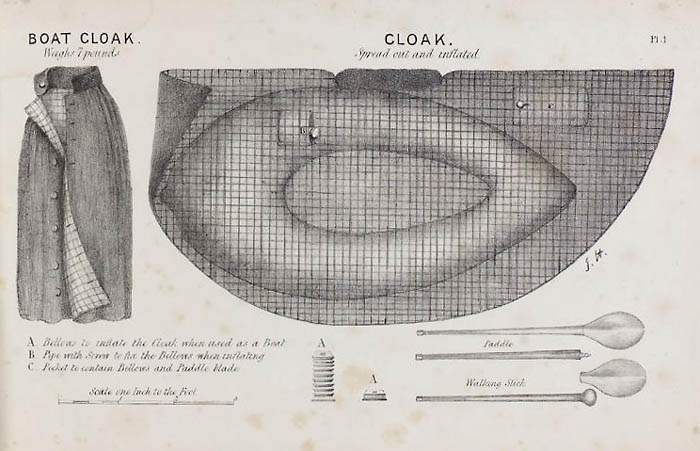
The Halkett boat-cloak furled as a cloak, and unfurled as an inflatable boat

Halkett designed a waterproof cloak made from an early form of Macintosh cloth, cotton impregnated with India rubber by using naphtha as a solvent. The lining of the cloak contained an airtight and watertight inflatable ovoid, split into four separate airtight compartments in case of puncture, and a pocket containing a paddle blade and a small bellows. The wearer of the cloak would carry a walking stick, which would double as the shaft of the paddle, and a large umbrella to serve as a sail. The cloak weighed around 7 1/2 pounds (3.4 kg) in total, and took three to four minutes to inflate; once inflated, it could support the weight of six to eight people.

In early 1844, Halkett successfully tested a prototype boat-cloak on the River Thames, paddling it 15 kilometres (9.3 mi) without taking on any water, despite, in his words, being "met by—passed by—and almost run down by—various Metropolitan Steamers plying to and fro in their several vocations, and causing no little commotion in the troubled waters of the River". Buoyed by this success, he took the prototype boat-cloak with him while on naval service, using it whenever the opportunity arose to test it under various sea conditions. In November 1844, Halkett hoped to test the boat-cloak in bad weather conditions, in the rough seas of the Bay of Biscay, but the weather was unusually calm. He was forced to take down his umbrella, and paddle, recalling later that "the winds that day were too civil by half, and the sleepless bay almost quite dormant". (Note: Despite Halkett's testing of the boat-cloak at sea, it was never intended to be used for anything other than the exploration of inland waterways and inlets.) The boat-cloak was positively received by explorers; John Richardson (who had almost died during the 1819–1822 Coppermine expedition) wrote that "Had we been possessed of such a contrivance in our first expedition, I have little doubt of our having brought the whole party in safely".

== Halkett's boats in the Canadian Arctic ==
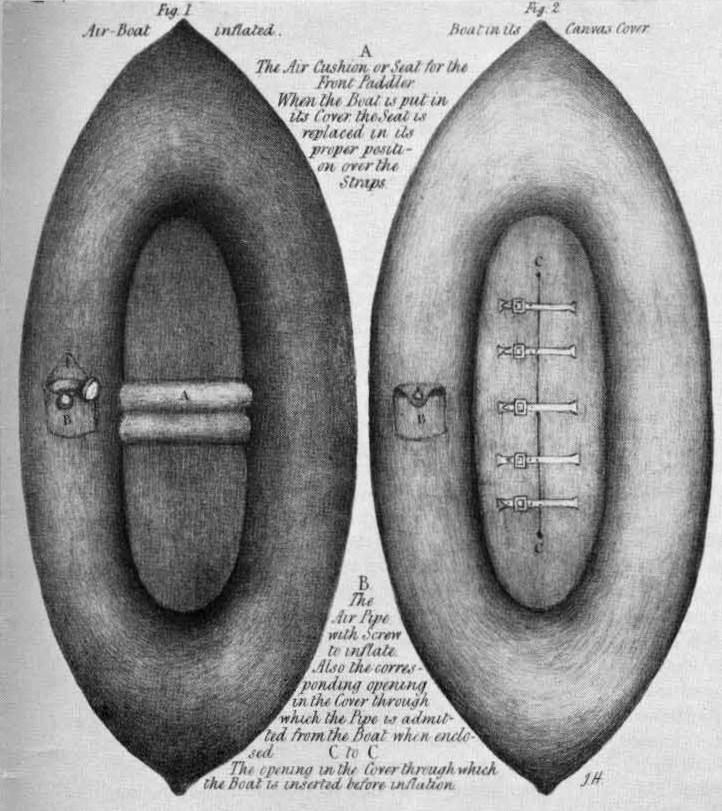
A two-man Halkett boat, with and without its canvas cover

Spurred on by the successful testing of the boat-cloak, Halkett designed a larger version that folded into a knapsack. When inflated, it could carry two men, operating a paddle on each side, and when deflated served as a waterproof blanket to allow the users to camp on wet ground. The Admiralty was sceptical about potential uses for Halkett's designs; on 8 May 1845 Lord Herbert, First Secretary to the Admiralty wrote to Halkett that "My Lords are of an opinion that your invention is extremely clever and ingenious, and that it might be useful in Exploring and Surveying Expeditions, but they do not consider that it would be made applicable for general purposes in the Naval Service".

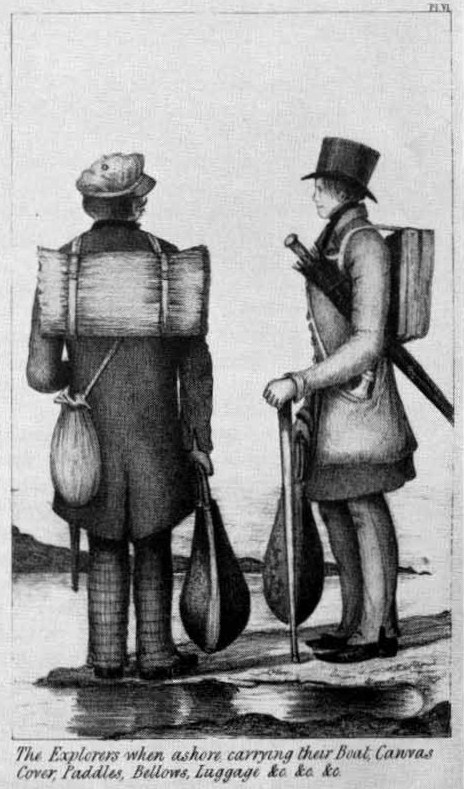
A deflated and stowed two-man Halkett boat, oars and umbrella-sail

Although the Admiralty saw no use to which Halkett's designs could be put in general naval service, this larger design was extremely well received by explorers. John Franklin bought one to take on the ill-fated 1845 expedition in which the entire expedition party of 129 men and two ships vanished. Franklin saw Halkett boats as so essential to travel in Canada that he gave the boat intended for his expedition to Sir George Simpson, Governor-in-Chief of Rupert's Land, for use in his travels in the region. He ordered a replacement boat from Halkett, who delivered it in time for him to take possession before setting out on his last expedition.

Orkneyman John Rae, known by the Inuit as ᐊᒡᓘᑲ (Aglooka, "He who takes long strides"), was a Hudson's Bay Company surgeon who became a surveyor of the Canadian Arctic. Unlike most Europeans of the period, Rae believed that the local inhabitants knew best how to cope with extreme weather conditions. He travelled Inuit-style, using sledges and snowshoes and sleeping in snow igloos. Rae took a Halkett boat on his first expedition in 1846, reporting that it was "most useful in crossing and recrossing the river at Repulse Bay", and that "although in constant use for upwards of six weeks on a rocky coast it never required the slightest repair" and "ought to form part of the equipment of every expedition".

Keen to find out what had become of the ships and men of Franklin's expedition, in 1848 the Royal Navy sent a search party led by John Richardson and John Rae, and equipped with a Halkett boat provided by the government, to search for the lost expedition. The party was unable to locate Franklin, but found the Halkett boat invaluable, on one occasion using the single boat to ferry their entire party across a river in 14 trips. Rae noted that although the rubber of the boat became stiff from the cold, there was no difficulty in warming it to soften the material when necessary. Halkett boats were likewise taken on the subsequent HMS Enterprise expedition that was sent to search for Franklin, during which they were successfully used for fishing.

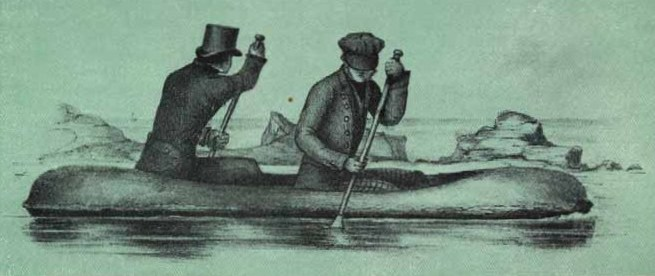
Two-man Halkett boat in use

In 1851 French explorer Joseph René Bellot mounted another expedition to find Franklin, sponsored by Franklin's wife. Bellot took a Halkett boat-cloak on the journey, noting in his journal that it was "of immense value in a country where the want of wood renders it impossible to form any sort of raft". Bellot's expedition was unable to locate Franklin, and it was not until 1853 that an expedition led by Rae (equipped with "two beautiful Halkett boats") located a group of Inuit who recounted seeing men dragging a boat four years earlier, and later finding their bodies.

== Commercial failure ==
Despite being promoted as ideal for lake-fishing and duck-shooting, and being exhibited in the Great Exhibition of 1851, Halkett's boat designs were not commercially successful and never entered general use outside the specialised field of Canadian exploration. Later promoted to captain, Halkett died on 23 March 1885, aged 65, and the manufacture of his boat designs was abandoned. John Rae gave his boat from the 1853 expedition to a Miss Peace of Kirkwall, and it lay forgotten on the rafters of a Kirkwall woodyard. It was identified and recovered many years later, and is now displayed in the Stromness Museum at Orkney. A second surviving example is held in the Hudson's Bay Company Museum Collection at the Manitoba Museum.

== See also ==
- Inflatable boat
- John Rae (explorer)
- Franklin's lost expedition
- Northwest Passage
- Canadian Arctic
- Rae–Richardson Arctic Expedition
