= John Rae (explorer) =

Scottish explorer (1813–1893)

John Rae FRS FRGS
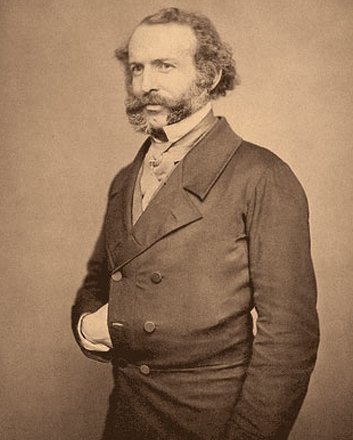
- Rae in 1862
- Born: 30 September 1813; Hall of Clestrain, Orphir, Orkney, Scotland
- Died: 22 July 1893 (aged 79); Kensington, London, England
- Burial place: St Magnus Cathedral, Kirkwall, Orkney, Scotland
- Education: University of Edinburgh
- Occupations: Physician, explorer, chief factor
- Employer: Hudson's Bay Company
- Known for: Report on the fate of Franklin's lost expedition
- Spouse: Catherine Thompson (m. 1860)
- Awards: Royal Geographical Society's Founder's Medal (1852)

John Rae (Inuktitut: ᐊᒡᓘᑲ, [aɡluːka]; 30 September 1813 – 22 July 1893) was a Scottish surgeon who explored parts of northern Canada. He was a pioneer explorer of the Northwest Passage.

Rae explored the Gulf of Boothia, northwest of the Hudson Bay, from 1846 to 1847, and the Arctic coast near Victoria Island from 1848 to 1851. In 1854, back in the Gulf of Boothia, he obtained credible information from local Inuit about the fate of John Franklin and his lost expedition, which had disappeared in the area in 1848. Rae was noted for his physical stamina, skill at hunting, boat handling, use of native methods, and ability to travel long distances with little equipment while living off the land.

== Early life ==
Rae was born as the sixth of nine children at the Hall of Clestrain in Orkney in the north of Scotland with family ties to Clan MacRae. His father managed up to 300 tenant farmers for a local nobleman, Sir William Honyman, Lord Armadale and worked for many years as the chief representative of the Hudson's Bay Company on the Orkney islands when it came to hiring workers amongst the Orkney men that had a reputation of being hardy and skilled labourers. Already in his childhood the young John Rae learned many skills that would become useful to his later explorations. By the age of fifteen, Rae had become an excellent musket hunter, rock climber and hiker, enjoying hobbies like fishing and boating.

After studying medicine in Edinburgh, he graduated with a degree from the University of Edinburgh and was licensed by the Royal College of Surgeons of Edinburgh at age 19 in 1833. Two months after graduating he accepted a post for a season as the ship's surgeon aboard the Prince of Wales, a supply ship for the Hudson Bay fur trading settlements. During his first voyage the ship was kept from its return home to Great Britain by an early winter 1833 and pack ice closing the route. The ship's crew had to spend the winter on the deserted Charlton Island. Rae's skills as a hunter and doctor, as well as his knowledge about fauna and its pharmaceutical merits managed to keep most men alive throughout the winter despite heavy cases of scurvy, which took two lives among the crew.

He went to work for the Hudson's Bay Company as a surgeon, accepting a post at Moose Factory, Ontario, where he remained for ten years. While working for the company, treating both European and indigenous employees, Rae became known for his prodigious stamina and skilled use of snowshoes. He learned to live off the land like a native and, working with the local craftsmen, designed his own snowshoes. This knowledge allowed him to travel great distances with little equipment and few followers, unlike many other explorers of the Victorian era.

== Explorations ==
=== Gulf of Boothia ===
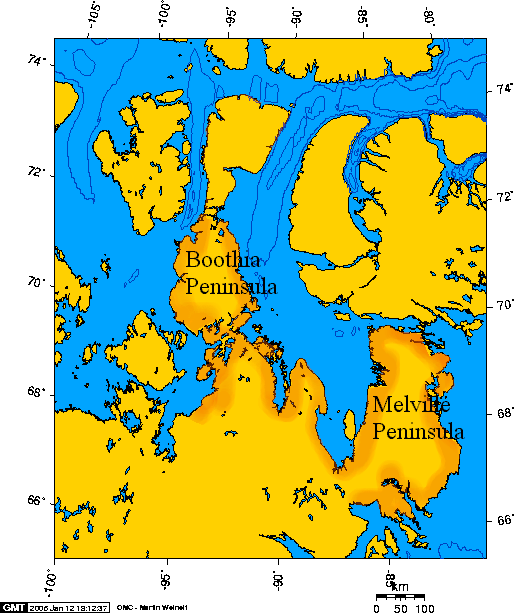
In 1846 and 1847 Rae explored the Gulf of Boothia, which lies between the Boothia Peninsula and the Melville Peninsula.

From 1836 to 1839, the Scottish explorer and fur trader Thomas Simpson sailed along much of the northern coast of Canada. His cousin Sir George Simpson proposed to link the furthest-east point Thomas Simpson had reached by sending an overland expedition from Hudson Bay. Rae was chosen because of his well-known skill in overland travel, but he first had to travel to the Red River Colony to learn the art of surveying. On 20 August 1844, Rae left Moose Factory, went up the Missinaibi River, and took the usual voyageur route west.

When he reached the Red River Colony on 9 October, he found his instructor seriously ill. After the man died, Rae headed for Sault Ste. Marie in Ontario to find another instructor. The two-month, 1,200 miles (1,900 kilometres) winter journey was by dog sled along the north shore of Lake Superior. From there, Sir George told him to go to Toronto to study under John Henry Lefroy at the Toronto Magnetic and Meteorological Observatory. Returning from Toronto, he received final instructions at Sault Ste. Marie.

Rae finally departed on the voyage to Simpson's furthest-east on 5 August 1845, taking the usual voyageur route via Lake Winnipeg and reaching York Factory on 8 October, where he wintered. On 12 June 1846, he headed north in two 22 feet (6.7 metres) boats and reached Repulse Bay (Naujaat) at the south end of the Melville Peninsula in July. The local Inuit told him that there was salt water to the northwest, so he chose this as his base. On his first journey, which began on 26 July, he dragged one of his boats 40 mi (64 km) northwest to Committee Bay in the south of the Gulf of Boothia. Here he learned from Inuit that the Gulf of Boothia was a bay and that he would have to cross land to reach Simpson's furthest-east.

In 1830, John Ross had also been told that the Gulf of Boothia was a bay. He sailed partway up the east coast of the Gulf, but soon turned back because he needed to make preparations for winter. He became one of the first Europeans to winter in the high Arctic without the aid of a depot ship. By December he had learned how to build igloos, which he later found warmer than European tents.

Rae's second journey began on 5 April 1847. He crossed to Committee Bay, travelled up its west coast for four days and then headed west across the base of the Simpson Peninsula to Pelly Bay. He went north and from a hill thought he could see Lord Mayor Bay, on the west side of the Gulf of Boothia, where John Ross had been trapped in ice from 1829 to 1833. He circled much of the coast of the Simpson Peninsula and returned to Repulse Bay. His third journey began on 13 May 1847. He crossed from Repulse Bay to Committee Bay and went up the east coast hoping to reach the Fury and Hecla Strait, which William Edward Parry's men had seen in 1822. The weather was bad and they began to run short of food. On 28 May, Rae turned back at a place he called Cape Crozier on the Melville Peninsula, which he thought was about 25 mi (40 km) south of the strait.

He left Repulse Bay on 12 August, when the ice broke up, and reached York Factory on 6 September 1847. He soon left for England and Scotland. Although he had not reached Simpson's furthest-east, he had reduced the gap to less than 100 mi (160 km).

=== Arctic coast ===
From 1848 to 1851, Rae made three journeys along the Arctic coast. The first took him from the Mackenzie River to the Coppermine River, which had been done before. On the second he tried to cross to Victoria Island but was blocked by ice. On the third he explored the whole south coast of Victoria Island.

By 1848, it was clear that the lost expedition of Sir John Franklin, which had travelled west from the coast of Greenland in 1845, had been lost in the Arctic. Three expeditions were sent to find him: one from the east, one through the Bering Strait, and one overland to the Arctic coast, this last led by Sir John Richardson. Most of the Arctic coast had been traced a decade earlier by Thomas Simpson. North of the coast were two coastlines called Wollaston Land, now the Wollaston Peninsula, and Victoria Land (Victoria Island). Franklin's crew was thought to be somewhere in the unexplored area north of that. The 61-year-old Richardson chose Rae as his second-in-command.

==== First journey ====
The Rae–Richardson Arctic expedition left Liverpool in March 1848, reached New York, and took the usual voyageur routes west from Montreal. On 15 July 1848, the expedition reached Fort Resolution on Great Slave Lake. A member of the party, John Bell, was sent downriver to establish winter quarters at Fort Confidence on the east arm of Great Bear Lake. Richardson and Rae travelled down the Mackenzie River and turned east along the coast.

They hoped to cross north to Wollaston Land, as southern Victoria Island was then known, but ice conditions made this impossible. Through worsening ice, they rounded Cape Krusenstern on the mainland at the west end of Coronation Gulf (not Cape Krusenstern in Alaska), and turned south. By the first of September it was clear that they had run out of time, so they abandoned their boats and headed overland. They crossed the Rae River and Richardson River and on 15 September reached their winter quarters at Fort Confidence at the northeast end of Great Bear Lake.

==== Second journey ====
In December 1848 and January 1849, Rae made two trips northeast to find a better route to Coronation Gulf. On 7 May, Richardson and Bell left with most of the men. Rae left on 9 June with seven men. Hauling a boat overland they reached the Kendall River on 21 June. The next day they reached the Coppermine River and waited a week for the ice to break up. They descended the Coppermine and waited again for the ice to clear on Coronation Gulf.

It was 30 July before they reached Cape Krusenstern on Coronation Gulf. From here they hoped to cross the Dolphin and Union Strait to Wollaston Land. On 19 August, they made the attempt, but after 8 mi (13 km) they were caught in fog and moving ice and spent three hours rowing back to their starting point. Rae waited as long as he could and turned back, reaching Fort Confidence on the first of September. On the return journey their boat was lost at Bloody Falls and Albert One-Eye, an Inuk interpreter, was killed.

==== Third journey ====
They reached Fort Simpson to the west of Yellowknife in late September 1849, where Rae took charge of the Mackenzie River district. A week later William Pullen showed up, having sailed east from the Bering Strait and up the Mackenzie River. In June 1850, Rae and Pullen went east up the Mackenzie with that year's furs. On 25 June, just short of Great Slave Lake, he was met by an express canoe. Pullen was promoted to captain and told to go north and try again. Rae received three letters from Lady Jane Franklin, the Sirs George Simpson, and Francis Beaufort, all telling him to return to the Arctic. Simpson promised supplies and left the route to Rae's discretion. Pullen left immediately with most of the equipment.

Rae escorted the furs as far as Methye Portage and returned to Fort Simpson in August. En route he wrote Sir George a letter outlining his complex but ultimately successful plan. That winter he would go to Fort Confidence and build two boats and collect supplies. Next spring he would use dog sleds to cross to Wollaston Land and go as far as he could before the ice melt made it impossible to recross the Strait. Meanwhile, his men would have hauled the boats overland to Coronation Gulf. When the ice melted he would follow the coast by boat as long as there was open water. He reached Fort Confidence in September and spent the winter there.

On 25 April 1851, he left the fort. On 2 May he crossed the frozen strait via Douglas Island to Lady Franklin Point, the southwestern-most point on Victoria Island. Heading east he passed and named the Richardson Islands and passed what he thought was the westernmost point reached by Thomas Simpson on his return journey in 1839. Heading west he passed Lady Franklin Point and followed the coast north and west around Simpson Bay, which he named. The coast swung north but it was getting late in the season.

He made a final push, the coast swung to the northeast and on 24 May, he could look north across Prince Albert Sound. Unknown to Rae, just 10 days earlier, a sledge party from Robert McClure's expedition had been on the north side of the sound. He turned south, crossed the Dolphin and Union Strait safely and on 5 June turned inland. The journey to camp on the Kendall River was the least pleasant part of the journey since he had to travel over melting snow and through meltwater.

On 15 June 1851, two days after the boat arrived, he set off down the Kendall and Coppermine rivers with ten men. He waited some times for the ice to clear and in early July he started east along the south coast of Coronation Gulf. In late July he crossed the mouth of Bathurst Inlet and reached Cape Flinders at the western end of the Kent Peninsula (Kiillinnguyaq). He reached Cape Alexander, on the Boothia Peninsula, at its east end on 24 July, and on 27 July crossed the strait to Victoria Island. He explored Cambridge Bay which he found to be a better harbour than Dease and Simpson had reported.

He left the bay and went east along an unknown coast. The coast swung north and the weather got worse. By August he was in Albert Edward Bay. Blocked by ice, he went north on foot and reached his furthest on 13 August. Returning, he left a cairn which was found by Richard Collinson's men two years later. He then made three unsuccessful attempts to cross Victoria Strait, at that time nearly always impassable, east to King William Island. On 21 August, he found two pieces of wood that had clearly come from a European ship. These were probably from Franklin's ship, but Rae chose not to guess.

On 29 August, he reached Lady Franklin Point and crossed to the mainland. He worked his way up the swollen Coppermine and reached Fort Confidence on 10 September. He had travelled 1,080 mi (1,740 km) on land, 1,390 mi (2,240 km) by boat, charted 630 mi (1,010 km) of unknown coast, followed the whole south coast of Victoria Island, and proved that Wollaston Land and Victoria Land were part of the same island, but had not found Franklin.

=== Franklin's fate ===
"The Fate of Sir John Franklin"
by John Rae, 1854
00:05:45 (text)

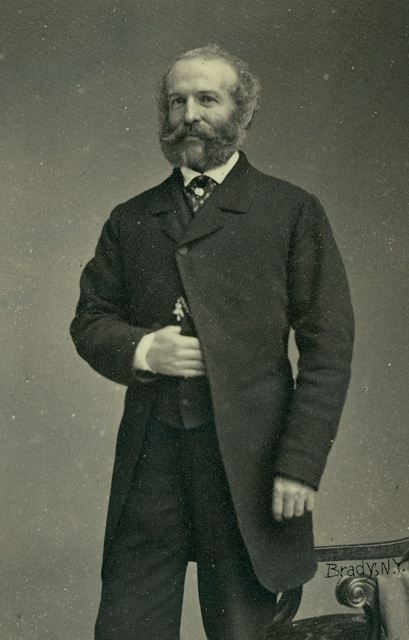
Rae in the 1860s

Rae headed south to Fort Chipewyan in Alberta, waited for a hard freeze, travelled by snowshoe to Fort Garry in Winnipeg, took the Crow Wing Trail to Saint Paul, Minnesota, and then travelled to Chicago, then Hamilton, Ontario, New York, and London, which he reached in late March 1852. In England he proposed to return to Boothia and complete his attempt to link Hudson Bay to the Arctic coast by dragging a boat to the Back River. He went to New York, Montreal, and then Sault Ste. Marie by steamer, Fort William by canoe, and reached York Factory on 18 June 1853, where he picked up his two boats. He left on 24 June and reached Chesterfield Inlet on 17 July. Finding a previously unknown river, he followed it for 210 miles (340 km) before it became too small to use. Judging that it was too late to drag the boat north to the Back River, he turned back and wintered at his old camp on Repulse Bay. He left Repulse Bay on 31 March 1854. Near Pelly Bay he met some Inuit, one of whom had a gold cap-band. Asked where he got it, he replied that it came from a place 10 to 12 days away where 35 or so kabloonat (or qablunaaq 'white person') had starved to death. Rae bought the cap-band and said he would buy anything similar.

On 27 April, he reached frozen salt-water south of what is now called Rae Strait. A few miles west, on the south side of the bay, he reached what he believed was the Castor and Pollux River, which Simpson had reached from the west in 1839. He then turned north along the western portion of the Boothia Peninsula, the last uncharted coast of North America, hoping to reach Bellot Strait and so close the last gap in the line from Bering Strait to Hudson Bay. The coast continued north instead of swinging west to form the south shore of King William Land.

On 6 May, he reached his furthest north, approximately 75 km (47 mi) south-west of what is now Taloyoak, which he named Point de la Guiche (De la Guiche Point) after an obscure French traveller he had met in New York. It appeared that King William Land was an island and the coast to the north was the same as had been seen by James Clark Ross in 1831. Author Ken McGoogan has claimed that Rae here effectively discovered the final link in the Northwest Passage as followed in the following century by Roald Amundsen, although Arctic historian William Barr has disputed that claim, citing the uncharted 240 km (150 mi) between Ross's discoveries and the Bellot Strait.

With only two men fit for heavy travel, Rae turned back. Reaching Repulse Bay on 26 May, he found several Inuit families who had come to trade relics. They said that four winters ago some other Inuit had met at least 40 kabloonat who were dragging a boat south. Their leader was a tall, stout man with a telescope, thought to be Francis Crozier, Franklin's second-in-command. They communicated by gestures that their ships had been crushed by ice and that they were going south to hunt deer. When the Inuit returned the following spring they found about 30 corpses and signs of cannibalism. One of the artefacts Rae bought was a small silver plate. Engraved on the back was "Sir John Franklin, K.C.H". With this important information, Rae chose not to continue exploring. He left Repulse Bay on 4 August 1854, as soon as the ice cleared.

Upon his return to Britain, Rae made two reports on his findings: one for the public, which omitted any mention of cannibalism, and another for the British Admiralty, which included it. However, the Admiralty mistakenly released the second report to the press, and the reference to cannibalism caused great outcry in Victorian society. Franklin's widow Lady Jane enlisted author Charles Dickens, who wrote a tirade against Rae in his magazine Household Words deriding the report as "the wild tales of a herd of savages", and later attacked Rae and the Inuit further in his 1856 play The Frozen Deep. Arctic explorer Sir George Richardson joined them, stating that cannibalism could not be the action of Englishmen but surely by Inuit themselves. This campaign likely prevented Rae from receiving a knighthood for his efforts. Later, 20th century archaeology efforts around King William Island confirmed that members of Franklin's lost expedition had resorted to cannibalism.

=== Later career ===
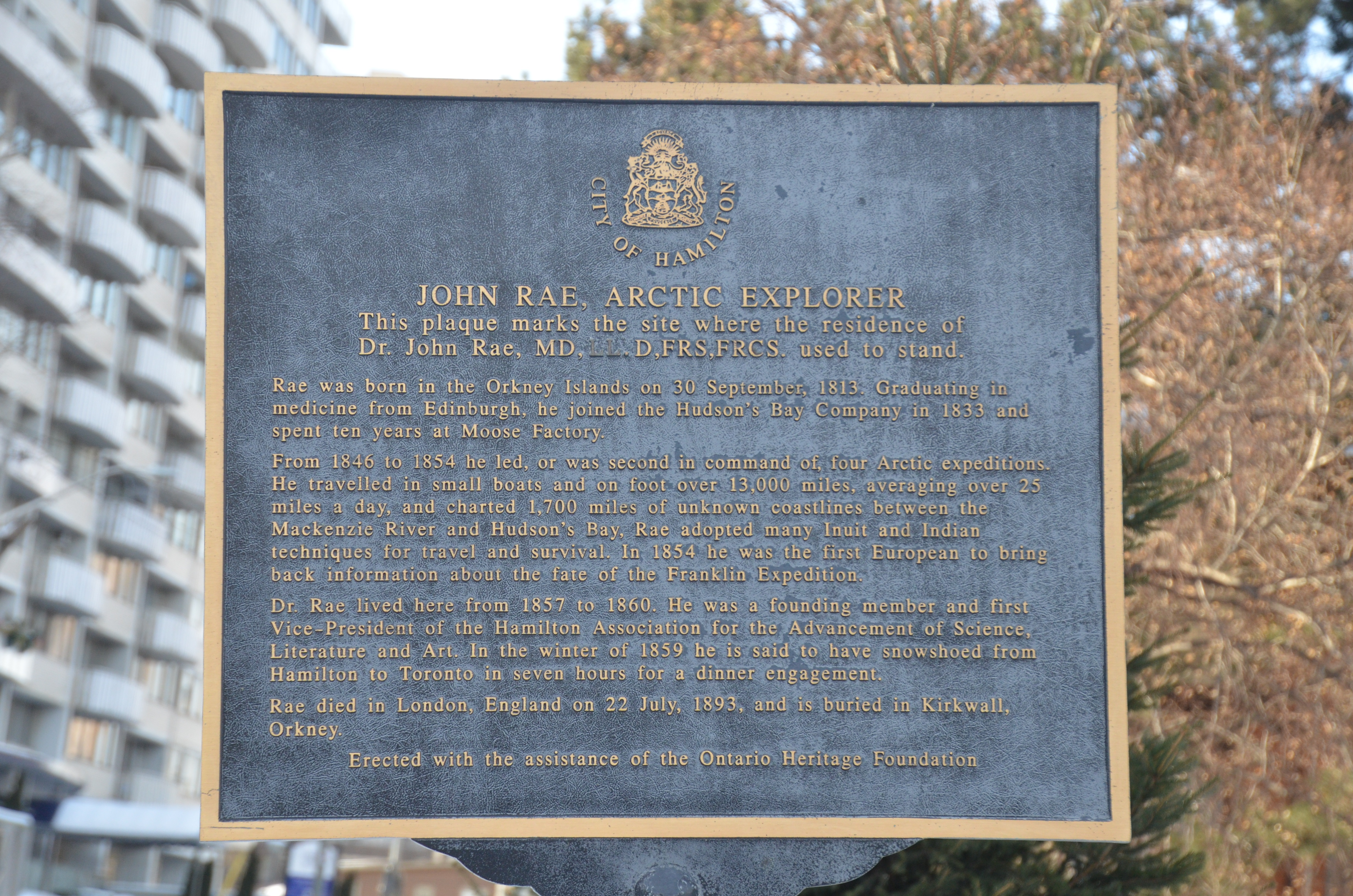
Plaque commemorating Rae's time in Hamilton, Ontario

With the prize money awarded for finding evidence of the fate of Franklin's expedition, Rae commissioned the construction of a ship intended for polar exploration, the Iceberg. The ship was built at Kingston, Canada West. Rae moved to Hamilton, Canada West, also on Lake Ontario, in 1857, where his two brothers lived and operated a shipping firm on the Great Lakes.

The Iceberg was launched in 1857. Rae intended to sail her to England the following year to be outfitted for polar voyages. In the meantime, she was put to use as a cargo ship. She was lost with all seven men on board in 1857, on her first commercial trip, hauling coal from Cleveland, Ohio to Kingston. The wreck, somewhere in Lake Ontario, has never been located. While in Hamilton, Rae became a founding member of the Hamilton Scientific Association, which became the Hamilton Association for the Advancement of Literature, Science and Art, one of Canada's oldest scientific and cultural organizations.

In 1860, Rae worked on the telegraph line to America, visiting Iceland and Greenland. In 1864, he made a further telegraph survey in the west of Canada. In 1884, at age 71, he was again working for the Hudson's Bay Company, this time as an explorer of the Red River for a proposed telegraph line from the United States to Russia.

== Death and legacy ==
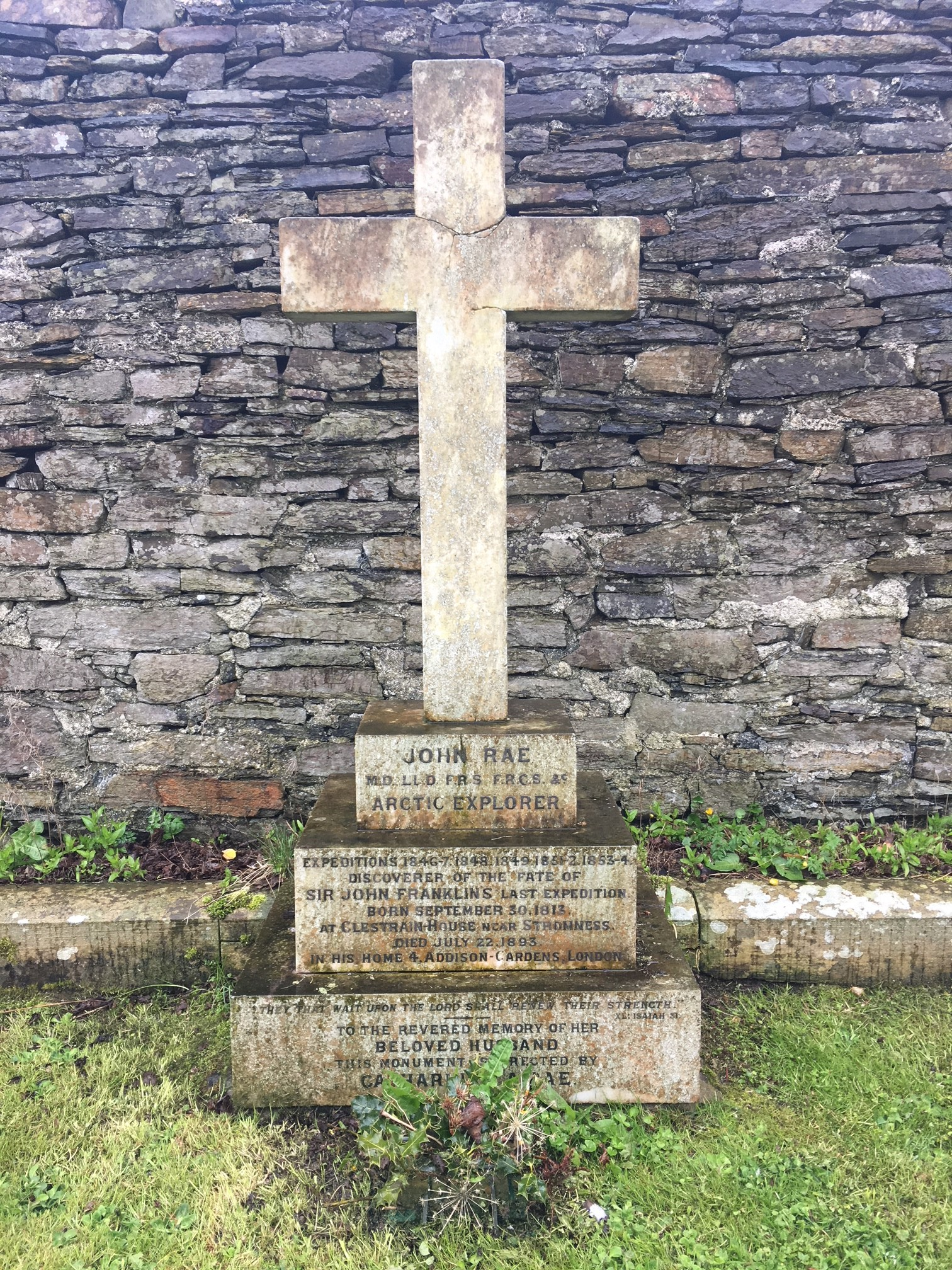
Rae's grave at St Magnus Cathedral in Kirkwall, Orkney

John Rae died from an aneurysm in Kensington, West London, on 22 July 1893. A week later his body arrived in Orkney. He was buried at St Magnus Cathedral in Kirkwall, Orkney.

A memorial to Rae, lying as in sleep upon the ground, is inside the cathedral. The memorial by North Ronaldsay sculptor Ian Scott, unveiled at Stromness pierhead in 2013, is a statue of Rae with an inscription describing him as "the discoverer of the final link in the first navigable Northwest Passage." Rae Strait, Rae Isthmus, Rae River, Mount Rae, Point Rae, and Rae-Edzo were all named for him.

The outcome of Lady Franklin's efforts to glorify the dead of the Franklin expedition meant that Rae, who had discovered evidence suggesting a much less noble fate, was shunned somewhat by the British establishment. Although he found the first clue to the fate of Franklin, Rae was never awarded a knighthood, nor was he remembered at the time of his death, dying quietly in London. In comparison, fellow Scot and contemporary explorer David Livingstone was buried with full imperial honours in Westminster Abbey.

Historians have since studied Rae's expeditions and his roles in finding the Northwest Passage and learning the fate of Franklin's crew. Authors such as Ken McGoogan have noted Rae was willing to adopt and learn the ways of indigenous Arctic peoples, which made him stand out as the foremost specialist of his time in cold-climate survival and travel. Rae also respected Inuit customs, traditions, and skills, which went against the beliefs of many 19th-century Europeans that most indigenous peoples were too primitive to offer anything of educational value.

In July 2004, Orkney and Shetland MP Alistair Carmichael introduced into the UK Parliament a motion proposing, inter alia, that the House "regrets that Dr Rae was never awarded the public recognition that was his due". In March 2009, he introduced a further motion urging Parliament to formally state it "regrets that memorials to Sir John Franklin outside the Admiralty headquarters and inside Westminster Abbey still inaccurately describe Franklin as the first to discover the [North West] passage, and calls on the Ministry of Defence and the Abbey authorities to take the necessary steps to clarify the true position." In October 2014, a plaque dedicated to Rae was installed at Westminster Abbey.

Rae is depicted in the 2008 movie Passage from the National Film Board of Canada.

He is the subject of the song 'John Rae's Welcome Home' by Scottish folksinger Malcolm MacWatt.

In June 2011, a blue plaque was installed by English Heritage on the house where John Rae spent the last years of his life, No. 4 Lower Addison Gardens, in Kensington, west London. After a conference in September 2013 in Stromness, Orkney to celebrate the 200th anniversary of John Rae's birth, a statue was erected to Rae at the pierhead. In December 2013, The John Rae Society, a registered charity under Scottish law, was formed in Orkney to promote Rae's achievements.

In 2014, Historic Environment Scotland awarded a plaque to commemorate Rae at his birthplace, the Hall of Clestrain. The John Rae Society purchased the Hall in 2016 with the intent of developing a museum to commemorate Rae and his achievements. The Society began its crowdfunding campaign to restore the house in December 2024.

== Bibliography ==
- McGoogan, Ken. Fatal Passage : The Story of John Rae – the Arctic hero time forgot. New York: Carroll & Graf Publishers, 2002. ISBN 9780786709939
- Richards, Robert L. Dr. John Rae. Whitby, North Yorkshire: Caedmon of Whitby Publishers, c.1985. ISBN 9780905355290
- Richards, R. L. (1990). "Rae, John (1813–93)". In Halpenny, Francess G. (ed.). Dictionary of Canadian Biography. Vol. XII (1891–1900) (online ed.). University of Toronto Press.
- Nadolny, Sten. Die Entdeckung der Langsamkeit. 1983.
- Newman, Peter C. Company of Adventurers. 1985.
- Newman, Peter C. Caesars of the Wilderness. 1987.
- Berton, Pierre. The Arctic Grail: The Quest for the North West Passage and the North Pole, 1818-1909. Random House of Canada, 2001.
- Greenford, Miles. In John Rae's Company
- Chisholm, Hugh, ed. (1911). "Rae, John" . Encyclopædia Britannica. Vol. 22 (11th ed.). Cambridge University Press. p. 811.
