= George Albert Llano =

Cuban-American lichenologist

- Jorge Alberto Cecilio Perez y Llano
- Born: 22 November 1911; Havana, Cuba
- Died: 9 February 2003 (aged 91); Akademik Ioffe, Argentine Sea
- Education: Cornell University; Columbia University; Washington University
- Spouse: Barbara Llano
- Scientific career
- Fields: Lichenology, botany
- Institutions: National Academy of Sciences; National Science Foundation
- Doctoral advisor: Carroll William Dodge
- Author abbrev. (botany): Llano

George Albert Llano (22 November 1911 – 9 February 2003), born Jorge Alberto Cecilio Perez y Llano, was a Cuban-born American polar explorer and botanist who specialized in the field of lichenology. He was an expert in the Umbilicariaceae.

== Early life ==
Llano was born in Havana, Cuba in either 1910, according to baptismal records, or 1911, based on legal records. He immigrated to the United States in 1918. He obtained his undergraduate degree at Cornell University in 1935, and his master's degree at Teachers College, Columbia University in 1939. In 1949, he completed his Ph.D. in botany at Washington University in St. Louis under Carroll William Dodge.

== Career ==
Llano took various jobs across the country before settling at the National Academy of Sciences and working on the International Geophysical Year. His experience in Antarctica led him to work for the National Science Foundation Office of Polar Programs in 1961. In 1972, he was promoted to Chief Scientist. His work in the Antarctic Biology and Medicine division was instrumental in establishing permanent Antarctic stations. He retired in 1977.

After his retirement, Llano continued lecturing, guiding expeditions, and fundraising for researchers. Among his beneficiaries were Ivan Mackenzie Lamb and Henry Andrew Imshaug, who undertook notable lichenological expeditions.

Llano died on 9 February 2003 of influenza while cruising on the Akademik Ioffe.

== Legacy ==
The whale genus Llanocetus is named for Llano. Mount Llano was also named in his honor. Carroll Dodge named some lichen species after him, including Buellia llanoi C.W.Dodge (1968), Lecania llanoi C.W.Dodge (1965), Physcia llanoi C.W.Dodge (1965), and Thelidium llanoi C.W.Dodge (1968). His monograph on the Umbilicariaceae is considered a seminal work in the field of lichenology. He has been credited for introducing the terms gyrodisc, leiodisc, and omphalodisc to refer to different types of fruiting bodies encountered in the Umbilicariaceae.
