= Nick Sikkuark =

Canadian artist (1943–2013)

- Born: 21 May 1943; Garry Lake, Nunavut (then part of the Keewatin),
- Died: 19 December 2013 (aged 70); Kugaaruk, Nunavut
- Known for: Inuk artist

Nick Sikkuark (21 May 1943 – 19 December 2013) was an Inuk artist from Kugaaruk, Nunavut. The broad range of his work, its technical ability and imagination makes it almost unique in terms of its culture.

== Life ==
Born at Garry Lake, Nunavut (then part of the Keewatin), Sikkuark was orphaned at a young age. He was then taken in by the Oblate Fathers. As a young man he studied for the clergy in Winnipeg and Ottawa before settling in Kugaaruk, Nunavut, then called Pelly Bay. It was in 1976, after travelling to Montreal for the Olympics that he began to work as an artist full-time, making carvings that drew upon his imagination or reflected his dreams. In 2001 or 2002, because of his lungs, he began to draw and paint. His drawings and paintings were also of spirits and legends.

== Work ==
His works are mainly in whale bone, caribou antler, and walrus ivory, and are characterized by "droll, macabre wit." They are imaginative and risk-taking, and pervaded with his love for the place where he lived.

In 2023, the National Gallery of Canada held his retrospective, titled Nick Sikkuark: Humour and Horror ᓂᑯᓚ ᓯᑯᐊ. ᐃᒡᓚᕐᓇᖅᑐᑦ ᐊᒻᒪ ᑲᑉᐱᐊᓇᖅᑐᑦ, which included more than 100 of his books, drawings, sculptures and paintings.

His work is in the permanent collection of the National Gallery of Canada.
