= Lord Mayor Bay =

Bay in Nunavut, Canada

- Location within Nunavut
- Location: Western Gulf of Boothia
- Coordinates: 69°44′N 92°02′W
- Basin countries: Canada
- Settlements: Uninhabited

Lord Mayor Bay is an Arctic waterway in Kitikmeot Region, Nunavut, Canada. It is located in the west of the Gulf of Boothia.

The bay is roughly diamond-shaped. To the north-east, the bay opens into the Gulf of Boothia; the Astronomical Society Islands lie in the bay's mouth. The Nunavut mainland surrounds the rest of the bay; to the north-west is the Boothia Peninsula.
