= Simialuk =

Island in the Qikiqtaaluk Region, Nunavut, Canada

- Location within Nunavut Location within Canada

Geography
- Location: Northern Canada
- Coordinates: 69°46′12″N 82°38′38″W
- Archipelago: Arctic Archipelago

Administration
- Canada
- Territory: Nunavut
- Region: Qikiqtaaluk

Demographics
- Population: Uninhabited

Simialuk (Inuktitut syllabics: ᓯᒥᐊᓗᒃ) formerly Ormonde Island is an irregularly shaped island located at the eastern opening of the Fury and Hecla Strait. Situated in Nunavut's Qikiqtaaluk Region within the northern Canadian Arctic, the island is north of the Melville Peninsula's Northeast Cape (separated by the Labrador Narrows), south of Baffin Island (Elder Island lies between them), and west of Foxe Basin. It is approximately 91 m (299 ft) above sea level.
