= Akademik Ioffe =

Expedition and research ship built in 1989

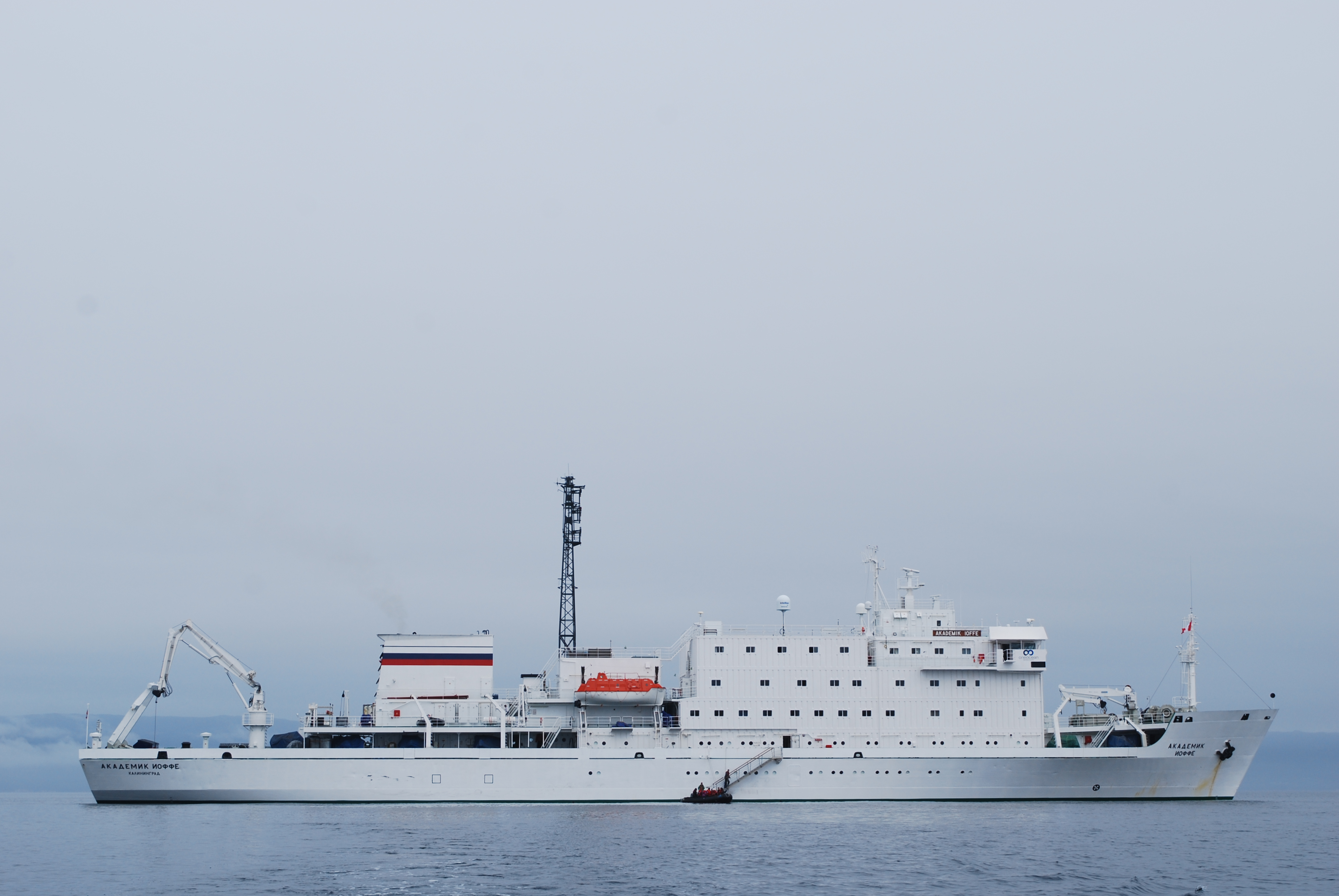
- Akademik Ioffe off the coast of Nova Scotia, Canada

History

Russia
- Name: Akademik Ioffe
- Operator: Shirshov Institute
- Port of registry: 1989–1992: Kaliningrad, Soviet Union; 1992 onwards: Kaliningrad, Russia
- Builder: Hollming, Rauma
- Yard number: 266
- Laid down: 27 February 1987
- Launched: 29 August 1987
- Completed: 9 February 1989
- Identification: IMO number: 8507731; MMSI number: 273413400; Callsign: UAUN
- Status: In service

General characteristics
- Tonnage: 6,450 GT; 1,935 NT; 1,738 DWT
- Length: 117.17 m (384 ft 5 in)
- Beam: 18.22 m (59 ft 9 in)
- Draft: 5.90 m (19 ft 4 in)
- Installed power: 2 × 6CHN 40/46 (2 × 2,576 kW)
- Propulsion: Two shafts; controllable pitch propellers; Wärtsilä 600 kW bow and stern thrusters
- Speed: 16.0 knots (29.6 km/h; 18.4 mph)
- Capacity: 117 passengers

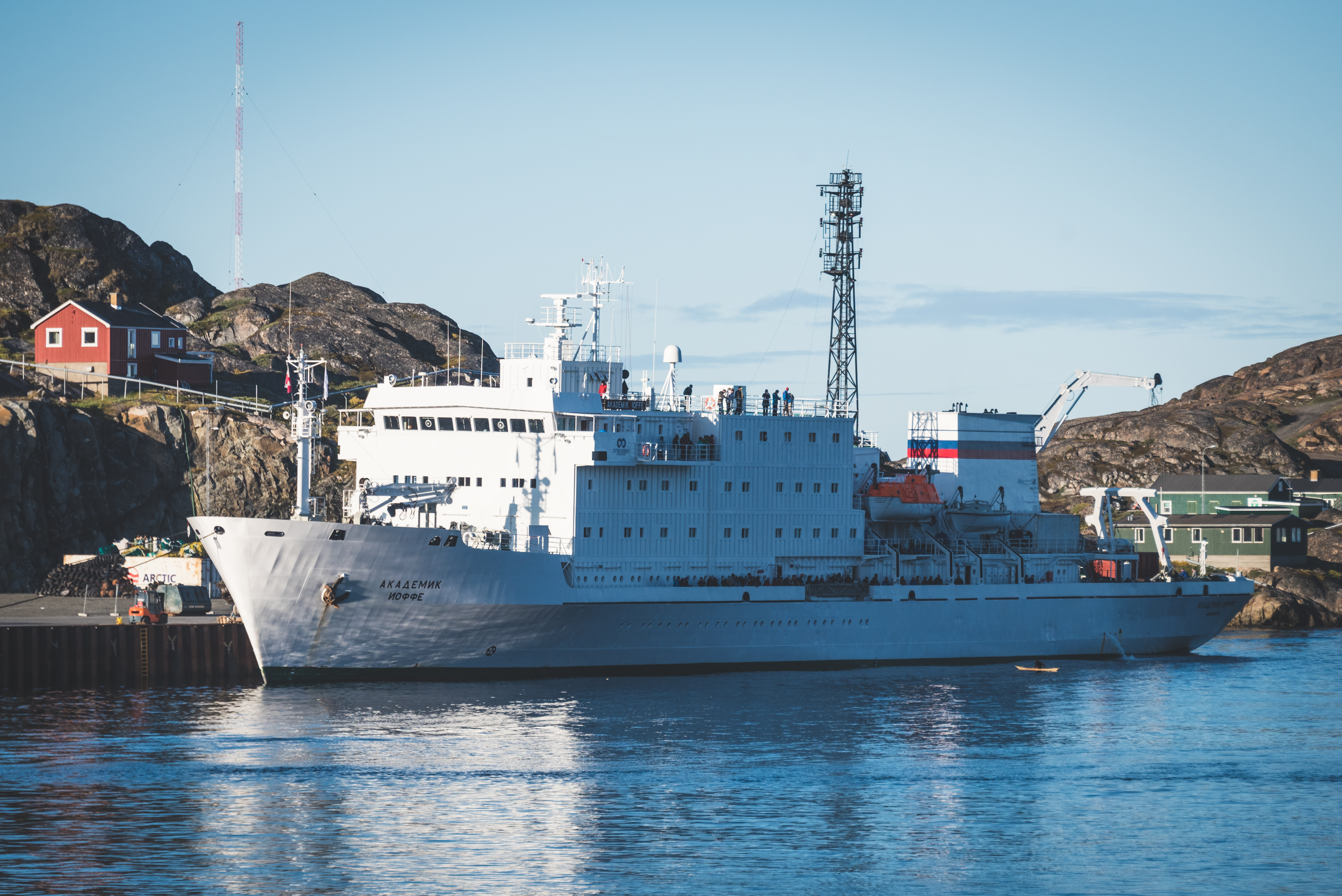
Akademik Ioffe, in Sisimiut, Greenland

Akademik Ioffe is a research vessel, named after the Soviet physicist Abram Fedorovich Ioffe.

Built in 1988, the vessel has a displacement of 6,600 tons, and a length of 364 ft (111 m). Akademik Ioffe and Akademik Sergey Vavilov were built as a joint project. Both ships feature a vertical shaft about two meters in diameter, which opens from the main deck into a special room, from which an acoustic receiver or a transmitter can be lowered to below the waterline by means of a winch. The vessels were used for experiments on the long-range propagation of sound in the ocean.

The vessel belongs to the Institute of Oceanology. P. P. Shirshov, of the Russian Academy of Sciences.

She was chartered by One Ocean Expeditions until 2019.

== 2018 grounding ==
The vessel ran aground west of the Astronomical Society Islands in the Gulf of Boothia, Nunavut, Canada in August 2018. There were 126 people on board; none were lost. The Akademik is said to have remained aground for 12 hours. The salvage effort cost Canadian taxpayers $513,025.44, in addition to Canadian Coast Guard costs.

== Research expeditions ==
- 1st expedition - August - December 1989, together with the R/V Academik Vavilov. Six groups of researchers from the USSR Academy of Sciences. Included - attempts to measure neutrinos, to study the passage of ultra-low-frequency oscillations, etc.
- 8th expedition - June - September 2000.
- 10th expedition - October - November 2001. Geological studies in the equatorial part of the Atlantic Ocean.
- 19th expedition - autumn 2005. Hydrological sections in the Drake Passage, Bransfield Strait and the Loper Strait.
- 20th expedition - spring of 2006.
- 21st expedition - summer of 2006. Hydrological section 59°30'; from the UK shelf to the southern tip of Greenland.
- 22nd expedition - autumn of 2006.
- 23rd expedition - summer of 2007. Hydrological section 59°30' from the UK shelf to the southern tip of Greenland, to the port of Iqaluit.
- 24th expedition - the fall of 2007. Hydrological section through the Drake Passage.
- 25th expedition - summer of 2008. A hydrological section of 59 ° 30 'from the UK shelf to the southern tip of Greenland - the Farwell metro station, ending in the port of St. John's (Newfoundland)
- 29th expedition is from October to November 2009.
