= Fort Confidence =

Hudson's Bay Company post in the Northwest Territories, Canada

- at the mouth of the Dease River on the eastern tip of the Dease Arm of Great Bear Lake, Northwest Territories Canada
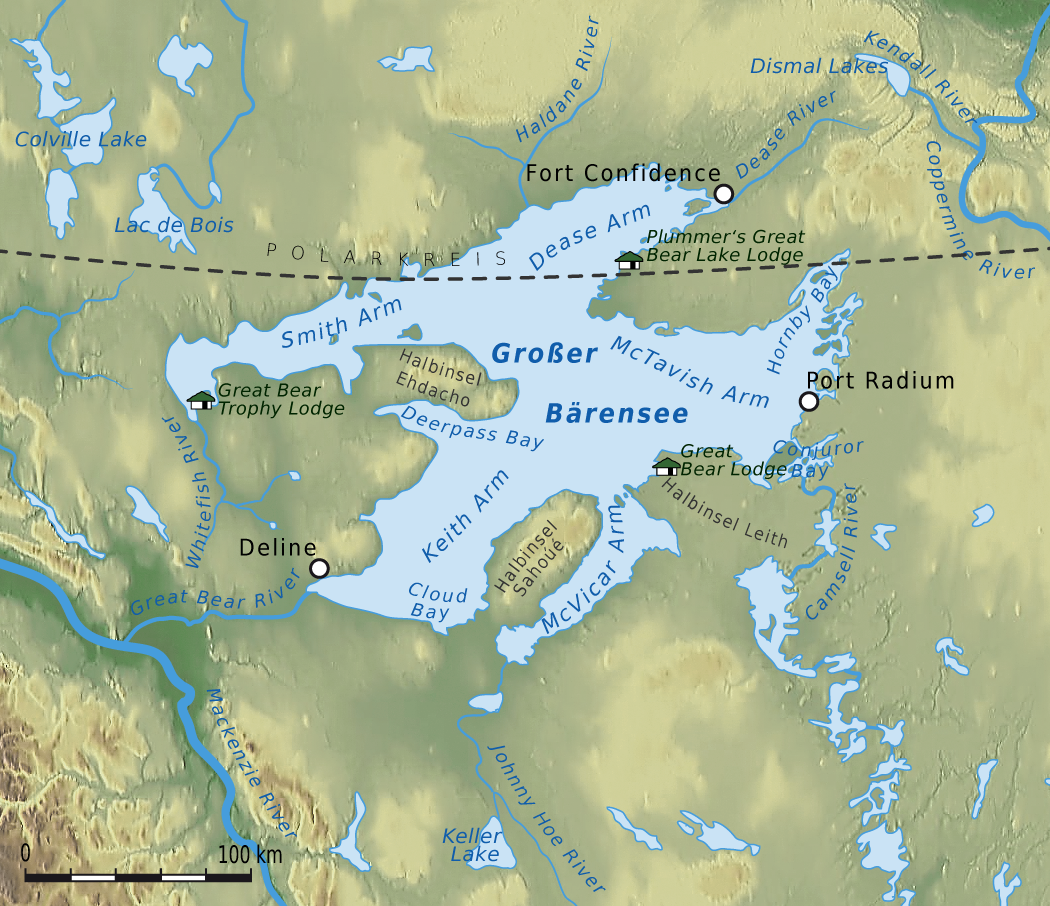
- Fort Confidence on the northeast shore of Great Bear Lake

Site information
- Type: post
- Controlled by: Hudson's Bay Company

Location
- Coordinates: 66°53′28″N 119°02′53″W

Site history
- Built: 1837

Fort Confidence, located at the mouth of the Dease River on the eastern tip of the Dease Arm of Great Bear Lake, Northwest Territories, was a Hudson's Bay Company establishment (not a trading post), built in 1837 by Peter Warren Dease and Thomas Simpson as a base for their exploration of the Arctic coast. It served as a quarters for two winters. The structure was a log building, and burned down a short time later. In 1848, the post was rebuilt by John Bell and used by Sir John Richardson and Dr. John Rae as a base of operations during the search for famous explorer Sir John Franklin, who went missing along the Arctic Coast. These buildings were still standing in 1902, but had again been destroyed by fire by 1911 when George M. Douglas's expedition to the Coppermine River passed through the area. The remains of this fort consist of four stone and clay chimneys.

Fort Confidence was featured in Jules Verne's book The Fur Country.

== Photo gallery ==
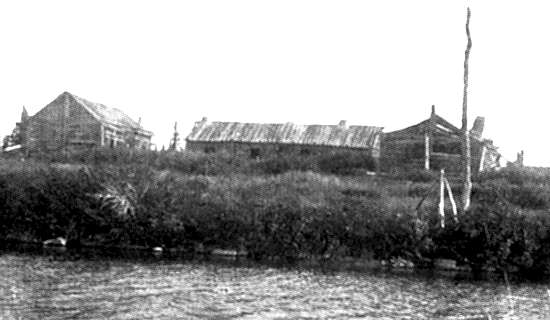
Photo of 1902, with buildings still standing

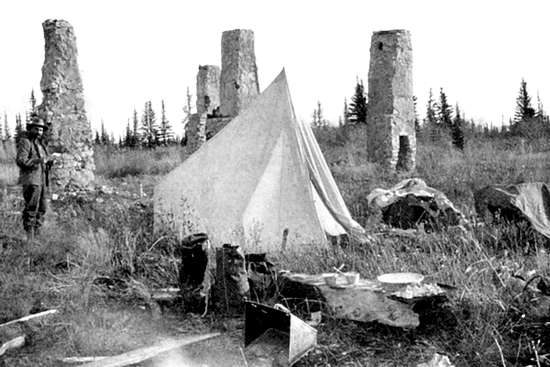
Photo of 1911, with only four chimneys remaining
