= Simpson Peninsula =

Peninsula in Nunavut, Canada

Coordinates: 68°45′N 089°10′W

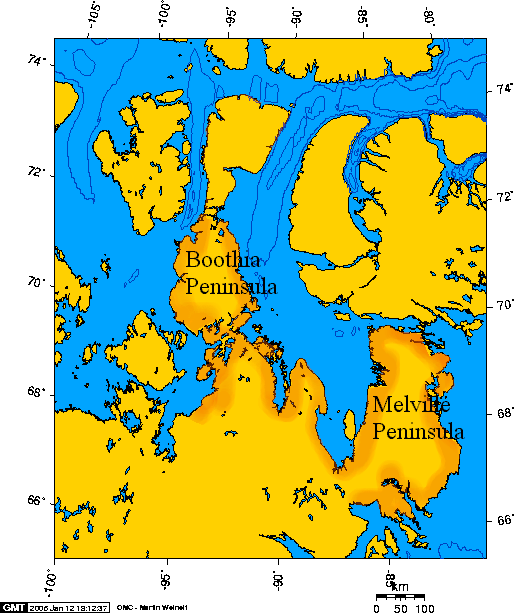
Simpson Peninsula is the north-pointing peninsula between Boothia Peninsula and Melville Peninsula

The Simpson Peninsula is a peninsula in the Gulf of Boothia in Canada's Nunavut territory. It is surrounded by waterways on three sides: Pelly Bay to the west, the Gulf of Boothia to the north, and Committee Bay to the east. Kugaaruk, a Netsilik Inuit hamlet, is located on its western coast.

It was explored by John Rae in 1847 and named for Sir George Simpson.
