= Pelly Bay =

Bay in Nunavut, Canada

- Location in Nunavut
- Location: Gulf of Boothia
- Coordinates: 68°53′N 90°05′W
- Ocean/sea sources: Arctic Ocean
- Basin countries: Canada
- Settlements: Kugaaruk

Pelly Bay is an Arctic waterway in Kitikmeot Region, Nunavut, Canada. It is located in the Gulf of Boothia. To the east, it is bounded by the Simpson Peninsula. Helen Island lies in the bay. Pelly Bay is named after Sir John Pelly, governor of the Hudson's Bay Company, that managed the British territory of Rupert's Land, that Pelly Bay was located within when it was named.

The settlement of Kugaaruk is located on the bay's eastern shore. Until 1999, Kugaaruk was also known as Pelly Bay.

== Climate ==
Kugaaruk is the location of the lowest wind chill ever recorded in Canada, of −79

On 16 February 2018, the Human Weather Observation System (HWOS), a type of semi-automated weather observing system, reported an unreviewed new minimum temperature for the month of February at −51.9 °C (−61.4 °F) at 06:00 MST. It beat the previous record of −51.5 °C (−60.7 °F) that was set 28 January 1989.

The area has a tundra climate (Köppen: ETf) with short but cool summers and long cold winters.

Climate data for Kugaaruk (Kugaaruk Airport) Climate ID: 2303092; coordinates 68°32′26″N 89°47′50″W; elevation: 15.5 m (51 ft); 1991–2020 normals, extremes 1984–present
Month	Jan	Feb	Mar	Apr	May	Jun	Jul	Aug	Sep	Oct	Nov	Dec	Year
Record high humidex	−2.3	−9.9	−3.5	1.4	9.8	25.9	29.4	26.4	18.4	5.6	−0.5	−1.6	29.4
Record high °C (°F)	−2.0 (28.4)	−10.0 (14.0)	−3.5 (25.7)	1.8 (35.2)	10.2 (50.4)	26.0 (78.8)	27.5 (81.5)	29.0 (84.2)	18.5 (65.3)	8.0 (46.4)	0.0 (32.0)	−1.4 (29.5)	29.0 (84.2)
Mean daily maximum °C (°F)	−28.1 (−18.6)	−29.1 (−20.4)	−24.2 (−11.6)	−14.5 (5.9)	−4.0 (24.8)	6.4 (43.5)	14.4 (57.9)	10.9 (51.6)	3.1 (37.6)	−5.0 (23.0)	−16.1 (3.0)	−23.3 (−9.9)	−9.1 (15.6)
Daily mean °C (°F)	−31.8 (−25.2)	−32.8 (−27.0)	−28.7 (−19.7)	−19.4 (−2.9)	−7.7 (18.1)	3.1 (37.6)	9.8 (49.6)	7.1 (44.8)	0.7 (33.3)	−8.0 (17.6)	−19.8 (−3.6)	−27.1 (−16.8)	−12.9 (8.8)
Mean daily minimum °C (°F)	−35.5 (−31.9)	−36.5 (−33.7)	−33.1 (−27.6)	−24.1 (−11.4)	−11.3 (11.7)	−0.1 (31.8)	5.2 (41.4)	3.3 (37.9)	−1.7 (28.9)	−10.8 (12.6)	−23.5 (−10.3)	−30.9 (−23.6)	−16.6 (2.1)
Record low °C (°F)	−51.5 (−60.7)	−51.8 (−61.2)	−51.0 (−59.8)	−44.5 (−48.1)	−32.0 (−25.6)	−15.2 (4.6)	−1.9 (28.6)	−5.0 (23.0)	−15.7 (3.7)	−31.0 (−23.8)	−42.3 (−44.1)	−48.5 (−55.3)	−51.8 (−61.2)
Record low wind chill	−79.0	−68.2	−63.4	−53.5	−40.1	−24.8	−6.3	−8.9	−19.8	−44.3	−53.1	−60.2	−79.0
Average precipitation mm (inches)	8.3 (0.33)	7.0 (0.28)	13.8 (0.54)	17.1 (0.67)	11.8 (0.46)	23.4 (0.92)	37.9 (1.49)	43.8 (1.72)	28.1 (1.11)	23.5 (0.93)	12.8 (0.50)	12.5 (0.49)	239.9 (9.44)
Average rainfall mm (inches)	0.0 (0.0)	0.0 (0.0)	0.0 (0.0)	0.0 (0.0)	0.8 (0.03)	20.7 (0.81)	39.7 (1.56)	46.1 (1.81)	17.2 (0.68)	1.1 (0.04)	0.0 (0.0)	0.0 (0.0)	125.5 (4.94)
Average snowfall cm (inches)	9.4 (3.7)	7.8 (3.1)	16.7 (6.6)	18.3 (7.2)	14.8 (5.8)	4.1 (1.6)	0.0 (0.0)	1.3 (0.5)	14.2 (5.6)	26.5 (10.4)	17.5 (6.9)	14.9 (5.9)	145.5 (57.3)
Average precipitation days (≥ 0.2 mm)	9.4	7.4	9.7	9.4	8.6	9.6	10.8	13.0	14.5	15.4	11.2	9.9	128.7
Average rainy days (≥ 0.2 mm)	0.0	0.0	0.0	0.0	0.65	6.9	10.2	13.2	7.2	0.50	0.0	0.0	38.7
Average snowy days (≥ 0.2 cm)	7.6	6.1	8.1	7.4	7.7	1.8	0.0	0.47	7.8	14.5	10.8	7.8	79.8
Average relative humidity (%) (at 1500 LST)	72.7	78.1	73.2	80.8	82.9	77.3	66.4	72.0	81.2	85.0	79.0	78.4	77.2
Source: Environment and Climate Change Canada (humidity 1981–2010)
