= Kugaaruk Airport =

Airport in Nunavut, Canada

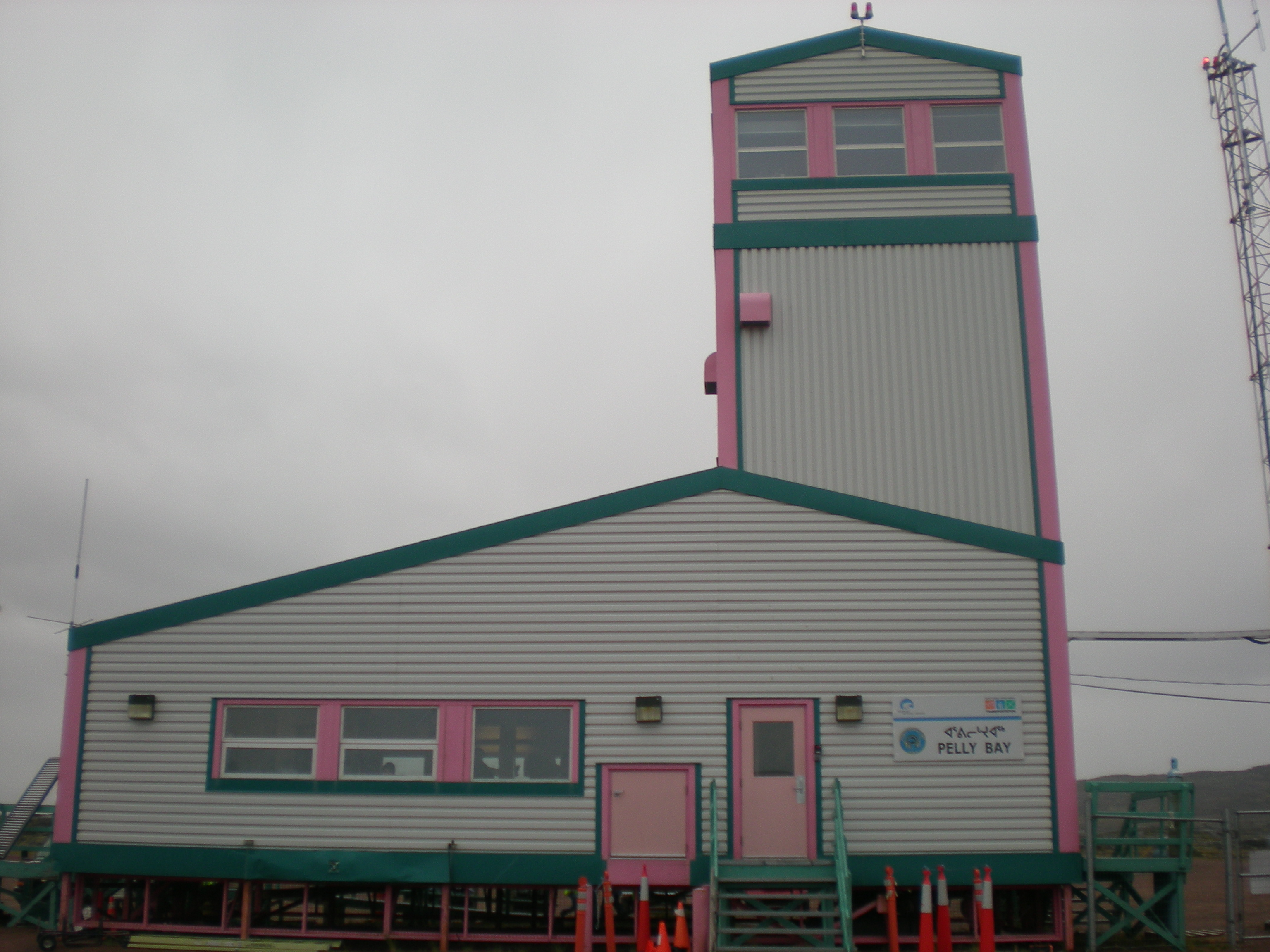
- Kugaaruk terminal from airside
- IATA: YBB; ICAO: CYBB; WMO: 71407

Summary
- Airport type: Public
- Operator: Government of Nunavut
- Location: Kugaaruk, Nunavut
- Time zone: MST (UTC−07:00)
  - Summer (DST): MDT (UTC−06:00)
- Elevation AMSL: 51 ft / 16 m
- Coordinates: 68°32′09″N 089°48′19″W

Map
- Location in Nunavut CYBB (Canada)

Runways
Direction	Length		Surface
Direction	ft	m	Surface
05/23	5,000	1,524	Gravel

Statistics (2010)
- Aircraft movements: 1,782
- Sources: Canada Flight Supplement; Environment Canada; Movements from Statistics Canada

Kugaaruk Airport (IATA: YBB, ICAO: CYBB), formerly known as Pelly Bay Townsite Airport, is located at Kugaaruk (formerly known as Pelly Bay) in Nunavut, Canada. It is operated by the government of Nunavut.

== History ==
The airport was built by the Government of Canada in 1968 as Pelly Bay Townsite Airport and renamed in 1999.

== Facilities ==
The terminal building, which includes a tower, is the only building at the airport.

== Airlines and destinations ==
Airlines	Destinations
Canadian North	Cambridge Bay, Gjoa Haven, Taloyoak, Yellowknife

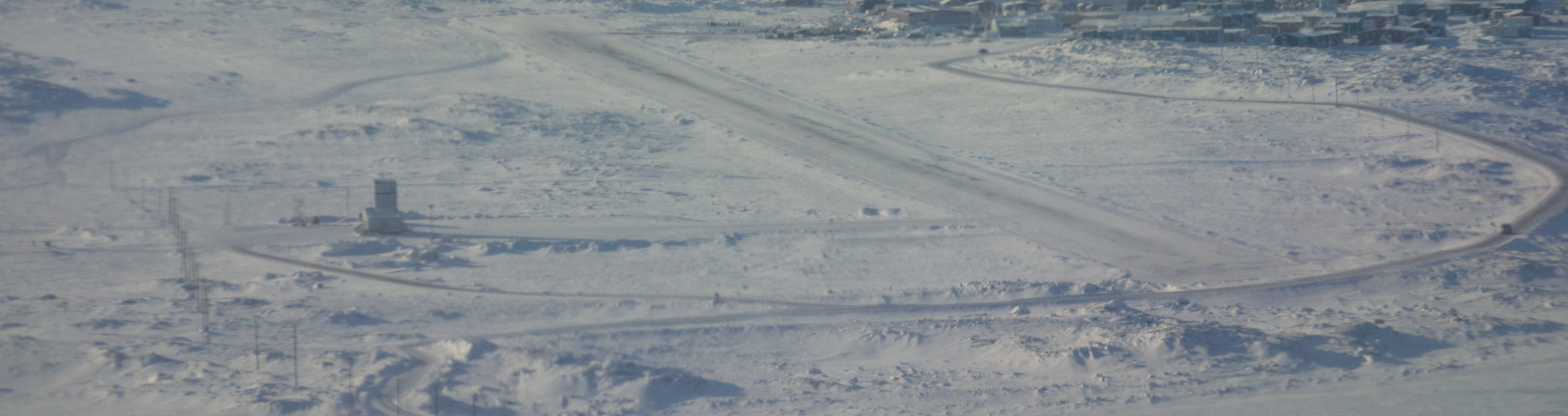
Aerial view of Kugaaruk airport
