= Fury and Hecla Strait =

Arctic strait below northwest Baffin Island, Nunavut, Canada

Coordinates: 69°50′N 083°00′W

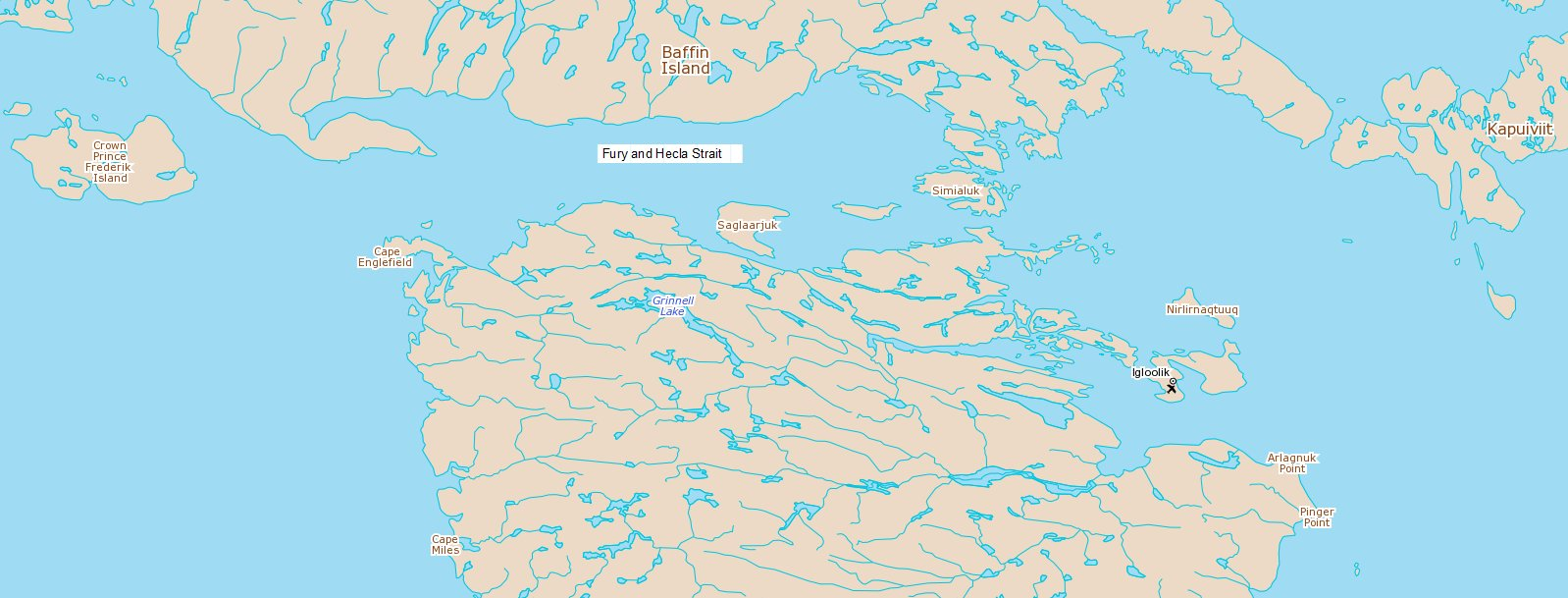
Map showing Fury and Hecla Strait, Nunavut, Canada, between Baffin Island to the north and the Melville Peninsula to the south. The settlement of Igloolik lies to the east.

Fury and Hecla Strait is a narrow (from 2 to 20 km (1.2 to 12.4 mi) wide) Arctic seawater channel located in the Qikiqtaaluk Region of Nunavut, Canada.

== Geography ==
Situated between Baffin Island to the north and the Melville Peninsula to the south, it connects Foxe Basin on the east with the Gulf of Boothia on the west. Water flow in the strait is sometimes westerly and sometimes easterly – there are diurnal and semidiurnal components to the flows; tidal and subtidal effects also play a role. The strait provides Arctic Ocean drainage for Hudson Bay via Foxe Basin. Several islands of the Arctic Archipelago are located inside the strait: Saglirjuaq (Liddon Island), Simialuk (Ormonde Island) and Saglaarjuk (Amherst Island) are the largest ones.

== History of exploration ==
The Strait is named after the Royal Navy ships HMS Fury and HMS Hecla, which encountered the strait in 1822 during an expedition led by William Edward Parry. Both ships became stuck in ice in October 1821, and remained immobile for eight months. During this time, the expedition learned of the strait from the native Inuit. Two men from the expedition set out with four Inuit on sled to assess the strait. Captain Parry would later accompany another trip to the strait.

In 1948, two United States Coast Guard icebreakers, the Edisto and Eastwind, succeeded in crossing the strait from east to west, and the Canadian Coast Guard ship Labrador succeeded in crossing the strait from west to east in 1956.

In August 2016, David Scott Cowper and son, Freddy Cowper, aboard M/V Polar Bound became the first vessel to transit Fury and Hecla Strait from east to west during their successful Route-7 West Northwest Passage.

== "The Ping" ==
Fury and Hecla Strait is the site of an unexplained sound called "The Ping", which emanated from the seabed throughout the summer of 2016. Originally recorded by a sailboat's onboard sonar, local hunters from the town of Igloolik blamed it for a comparative scarcity of marine game animals that year. Canadian military authorities performed an airborne survey of the area but reported nothing unusual, nor did they have any knowledge of allied or foreign submarine activity in the area. The local legislative assembly member Paul Quassa mentioned past rumours of Greenpeace using sonar signals to drive animals away from hunting grounds, but a spokesperson for the group denied any such activity. Quassa also mentioned the possibility of sonar surveys conducted by local mining companies, but he noted no territorial permits for such work had been issued.

According to Peter Worcester of the Scripps Institution of Oceanography at the University of California, a possible cause of the acoustic noise could be the product of sea ice on the Arctic Ocean rubbing together, cracking, and moving.

== See also ==
- List of unexplained sounds
