= Melville Peninsula =

Peninsula in the Canadian Arctic north of Hudson Bay

Coordinates: 68°N 084°W

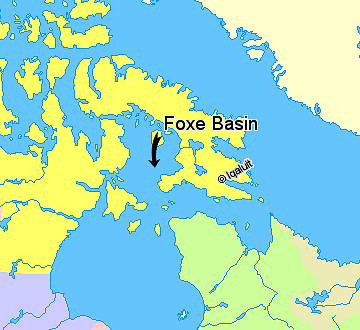
The Melville Peninsula is on the west side of Foxe Basin.

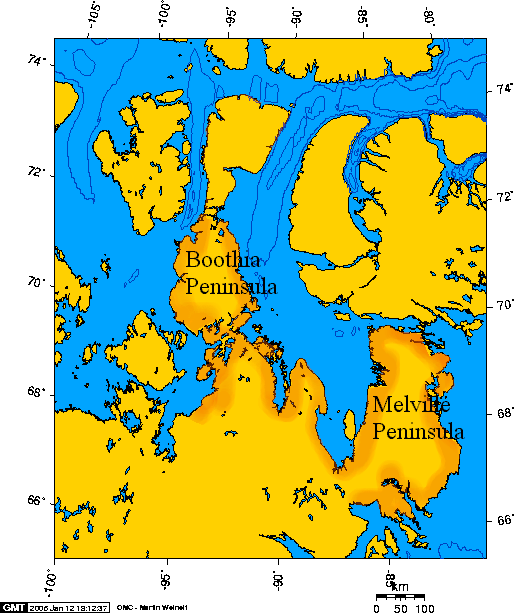
Boothia and Melville Peninsulas, Nunavut, Canada. To the north of Melville Peninsula is Baffin Island.

Melville Peninsula is a peninsula in the Canadian Arctic north of Hudson Bay. To the east is Foxe Basin and to the west the Gulf of Boothia. To the north the Fury and Hecla Strait separates it from Baffin Island. To the south Repulse Bay and Frozen Strait separate it from Southampton Island at the north end of Hudson Bay. On the southwest it is connected to the mainland by the Rae Isthmus, named after the Arctic explorer John Rae.

Between 1821 and 1823 its east side was mapped by William Edward Parry, who named the peninsula (along with Melville Island) after Robert Dundas, 2nd Viscount Melville First Sea Lord of the Admiralty. Since 1999, it has been part of Nunavut. Before that, it was part of the District of Franklin. Most of the peninsula lies in Nunavut's Qikiqtaaluk Region, while its southwesternmost section, around Repulse Bay, lies in the Kivalliq Region. Communities on the peninsula include the hamlets of Naujaat and Sanirajak. The hamlet of Igloolik is located on an island lying just off the northeastern coast of the peninsula. Adjoining Igloolik is Igloolik Airport.
