= Gulf of Boothia =

Body of water in Nunavut, Canada

- Location of Gulf of Boothia in Nunavut
- Location: Kitikmeot and Qikiqtaaluk Regions, Nunavut, Canada
- Coordinates: 70°40′N 91°00′W
- Ocean/sea sources: Arctic
- Basin countries: Canada

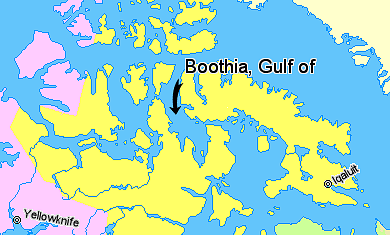
Map indicating the Gulf of Boothia, Nunavut, Canada. Nunavut Northwest Territories Greenland Quebec Newfoundland and Labrador

The Gulf of Boothia /ˈbuːθiə/ is a body of water in Nunavut, Canada. Administratively it is divided between the Kitikmeot Region on the west and the Qikiqtaaluk Region on the east. It merges north into Prince Regent Inlet, the two forming a single bay with different names for its parts. It is surrounded by, clockwise, Baffin Island, Fury and Hecla Strait, the Melville Peninsula, the Canadian mainland, and the Boothia Peninsula. The south end is Committee Bay, northwest of which are the Simpson Peninsula and Pelly Bay. On the west side of the gulf at 70°18′N 91°42′W, north of Pelly Bay and Thom Bay, is Eden Bay, which should not be confused with a bay of the same name in the Qikiqtaaluk Region.

In 1822, it was seen by some of William Edward Parry's men, who went on foot along the ice-choked Fury and Hecla Strait. In 1829, it was entered by John Ross, who was frozen in for four years and named it for his patron Sir Felix Booth. Its south end was explored by John Rae in 1846–1847, who reached it overland from the south.
