= Nancy Pukingrnak Aupaluktuq =

Canadian Inuk artist

- Born: 1940 (age 85–86); Chantrey Inlet, Nunavut, Canada
- Occupation: Artist
- Mother: Jessie Oonark
- Relatives: Victoria Mamnguqsualuk (sister); Janet Kigusiuq (sister); William Noah (brother)

Nancy Pukingrnak Aupaluktuq (born 1940) is a Canadian Inuk artist known for her sculptures, drawings, and textile art. Her work draws from Inuit mythology and features Western spatial perspective.

== Early life ==
Born in the Chantrey Inlet area of what is now the Kivalliq Region of Nunavut, Pukingrnak Aupaluktuq is the daughter of noted Inuk artist Jessie Oonark; among her siblings are the artists Victoria Mamnguqsualuk, Josiah Nuilaalik, Janet Kigusiuq, Mary Yuusipik Singaqti, Miriam Nanurluk, and William Noah. In childhood, she lived the traditional nomadic Inuit life, but the difficult winter of 1958 led to the family's resettlement in the community of Baker Lake, where shortly thereafter she married.

== Career ==
With encouragement from her mother and her sister Victoria, she began carving in 1962; her first drawings followed in 1969. She also works in fabric. Pukingrnak Aupaluktuq's work draws heavily on Inuit mythology, and includes depictions of Kiviuq and Kavaq. Unlike older Inuit artists, her work shows a knowledge of Western spatial perspective. Her art was first exhibited in 1974 at a showing of Baker Lake sculpture in Montreal, and in 1976 she had her first solo show, at the Upstairs Gallery in Winnipeg. She has continued to exhibit both in Canada and internationally. Pukingrnak Aupaluktuq's work is in the collections of the Canadian Museum of Civilization, the Department of Indian Affairs and Northern Development, the Winnipeg Art Gallery, the Macdonald Stewart Art Centre, and the Art Gallery of Ontario.

In 2006, the Department of Indian Affairs and Northern Development issued a monograph, The Legend of Kiviuq as Retold in the Drawings of Nancy Pukirnak Aupaluktuq, which tells the story of the legendary Inuk hero, Kiviuq.
