= Baker Lake =

Baker Lake may refer to:

== Canada ==
- Baker Lake, Nunavut, a community
- Baker Lake (Nunavut), a lake
- Baker Lake Airport, the airport serving the community
- Baker Lake Water Aerodrome, a water aerodrome serving the community during part of the year
- Baker Lake (electoral district), a territorial electoral district (riding) for the Legislative Assembly of Nunavut
- Lac Baker, New Brunswick, a community
- Lac Baker (New Brunswick), a lake
- Lac Baker Parish, New Brunswick

== United States ==
- Baker Lake (California), a lake in Shasta County
- Baker Lake (Blaine County, Idaho), a lake in Blaine County
- Baker Lake (Custer County, Idaho), a lake in Custer County
- Baker Lake (Maine), a lake in Somerset County
- Baker Lake (Washington), a lake in Whatcom County
