= William Noah =

Canadian politician

- Born: 1944 (age 81–82); Back River, Northwest Territories (now Nunavut)

William Noah (born 1944, Back River, Northwest Territories (now Nunavut)) is a former territorial level politician and artist. He served as a member of the Northwest Territories Legislature from 1979 until 1982.

Noah was first elected to the Northwest Territories Legislature in the 1979 Northwest Territories general election, winning the Keewatin North electoral district. He resigned before completing the end of his first term in 1982.

Noah currently resides in Baker Lake, Nunavut. He ran the constituency office for Baker Lake MLA David Simailak. He currently works as a Community Liaison Officer on the Kiggavik Project for AREVA Resources Canada.

In 1998 the Macdonald Stewart Art Centre Marion Jackson, Judith Nasby, William Noah co-curated a major exhibition with catalogue both entitled Qamanittuaq (Where the River Widens): Drawings by Baker Lake Artists which included and a memoir by William Noah and distinguished drawings by Noah, his three siblings Janet Kigusiuq, Victoria Mamnguqsualuk, and Nancy Pukingrnak, and their mother— first-generation artist— Jessie Oonark CM OC RCA.

Noah formed the Art and Cold Cash Collective, a five-person artists' collective, with Sheila Butler, Ruby Arngna'naaq, Patrick Mahon, and Jack Butler.

Legislative Assembly of the Northwest Territories
Preceded by New District	MLA Keewatin North; 1979-1982	Succeeded by Gordon Wray
