= Miriam Marealik Qiyuk =

Canadian Inuk artist (1933–2016)

Miriam Marealik Qiyuk (1933–2016) was a Canadian Inuk artist.

== Biography ==
One of eight children of artist Jessie Oonark to survive to adulthood, Qiyuk was born into the traditional nomadic lifestyle before moving to Baker Lake in her early twenties. She began creating wall-hangings and carvings in the early 1960s; she had to give up working with textile around 1980 due to an allergic reaction to wool. Her carvings often deal with the legend of Kiviuq and the bird-woman to whom he is married. She is known for her decorative work. Qiyuk is married to the artist Silas Qiyuk. Her work has been featured in numerous exhibitions both in Canada and in the United States. Qiyuk is one of a number of Oonark's children to become artists; others include Janet Kigusiuq, Victoria Mamnguqsualuk, Nancy Pukingrnak, Peggy Qablunaaq Aittauq, Mary Yuusipik Singaqti, Josiah Nuilaalik, and William Noah. Qiyuk died in 2016.
