= Jessie Oonark =

Inuk artist

Jessie Oonark OC RCA
- Una; Unaaq
- Born: 2 March 1906; Chantrey Inlet
- Died: 7 March 1985 (aged 78); Churchill, Manitoba
- Known for: Inuk graphic artist, fabric artist
- Notable work: Woman (1970); Big Woman
- Movement: Contemporary (post-1949) period of Inuit art
- Spouse(s): Qabluunaq, (Kabloona) son of Naatak and Nanuqluq
- Children: Janet Kigusiuq; Joshuan Nuilaliq; Mamnguqsualuq; Victoria Mamnguqsualuq; Miriam Nanuqluq; Mary Yuusipik; Peggy Gabluunaq; Nancy Pukingnaq; William Noah; Isumataq; Qaqurialuq; Amarouk; Makitgag

Jessie Oonark, OC RCA ( ᔨᐊᓯ ᐅᓈᖅ; 2 March 1906 – 7 March 1985) was a prolific and influential Inuk artist of the Utkuhiksalingmiut Utkuhiksalingmiut whose wall hangings, prints and drawings are in major collections including the National Gallery of Canada.

== Early years ==
She was born in 1906 in the Chantrey Inlet (Tariunnuaq) area, near the estuary of the Back River in the Keewatin District of the Northwest Territories (now Nunavut)—the traditional lands of the Utkuhiksalingmiut Utkukhalingmiut, Utkukhalingmiut (the people of the place where there is soapstone). Her artwork portrays aspects of the traditional hunter-nomadic life that she lived for over five decades. She moved from the fishing camp near the mouth of Back River on Chantrey Inlet in the Honoraru area to their caribou hunting camp in the Garry Lake area. She lived in winter snow houses (igloos) and caribou skin tents in the summer.

Oonark learned early how to prepare skins and sew caribou skin clothing. They subsisted mainly on trout (lake trout and Arctic char), whitefish, and barren-ground caribou. The knife used by women, the ulu, their traditional skin clothing, the kamik, the amauti were recurring themes in her work. Oonark has had a major museum retrospective with accompanying scholarly monograph. Despite a late start – she was 54 years old when her work was first published – she was an active and prolific artist over the next 19 years, creating a body of work that won critical acclaim and made her one of Canada's best known Inuit artists.

== Biography ==
Jessie Oonark's parents were Qiliikvuq and Aghlquarq(Aglaguaq). Aglaguaq and his brothers hunted muskox. Oonark's spent most of her time the in Chantrey Inlet where fish were abundant. The Utkukhalingmiut had many taboos, one of which was the drawing of images. According to Marie Bouchard— a researcher, art historian, and community worker who lived in Baker Lake for many years— "Oonark's grandmother repeatedly warned her that images could come to life in the dark of night." Oonark's mother married Qiqniikpak after the death of Oonark's father. Oonark lived with her mother.

The Danish explorer, Knud Rasmussen, crossed the Canadian Arctic by dogsled and visited the Jessie Oonark's camp when she was just a teenager during his Fifth Thule Expedition. Utkuhikhalingmiut represented the first white contact. In the 1980s, Mame Jackson taped Jessie Oonark's description of the encountered broadcast on CBC radio.

Oonark was married at a young age to Qabluunaq, (Kabloona, Kabloonak) the son of Naatak and Nanuqluq from Gjoa Haven. Natak joined them in their hunting camp. Although Kabloona was "a good hunter and a respected fur trader", the family was often hungry. Their oldest daughter remembers the periods of hunger. Oonark's mother-in-law, Naatak, would boil a caribou skin into a "broth" in an attempt to appease the hunger. Even in 2007, Baker Lake Inuit kept animal bones for marrow patek.

"My grandmother, Natak, was always cooking something. She used to cook caribou skins. She would take hair off the skin and cook it. We would drink the broth. My grandmother used to even cook wolf meat. That was how we survived."

— Janet Kigusiuq to Marie Bouchard

Their first daughter, Janet Kigusiuq, was born at Putuqsuqniq in the Back River area in 1926. She had eleven more children including Joshuan Nuilaliq, Mamnguqsualuq, Victoria Mamnguqsualuq, Miriam Nanuqluq, Mary Yuusipik, Peggy Gabluunaq, Nancy Pukingnaq (born 1940–), William Noah, Isumataq, Qaqurialuq, Amarouk, and Makitgag.

In the 1940s, Oonark was assigned a disc number by the Canadian federal government— E2-384. In the 1940s, the Royal Canadian Mounted Police (RCMP) conducted a census of Inuit populations. They assigned the infamous identification numbering system using discs. These disc numbers were dropped during "Operation Surname" in the 1960s.

In the 1950s, there was a slump in the fox fur trade. Sometime around 1953 and 1954, Kabloonak and her four youngest children died of illness in the Garry Lake area when William Noah was still a child and Nancy Pukingrnak was in her early teens and they were still dependent on her. Luke Anguhadluq, camp leader helped her at this time.

== Utkuhikhalingmiut ==
She was a fluent speaker of Utkuhiksalik, a sub dialect of Natsilingmiutut spoken by Netsilik (Natsilik) within the Western Canadian Inuit dialect continuum. Just as it was true for the art of other first-generation Inuit artists from that area—Luke Anguhadluk and Marion Tuu'luq—Utkuhiksalingmiut oral history and legends were strongly reflected in Jessie's artwork. In later years, in Baker Lake, they became a small minority, and fewer people could speak the language.

== Starvation ==
The annual caribou migration shifted away from the area where they lived, leaving many Inuit to starve. The Back River Inuit, including Oonark and her family, had a hard time during the starvation period of the 1950s. The winter of 1957–1958 was marked by a severe shortage of country food in the Back River area. Oonark and her daughter Nancy Pukingrnak were starving. William Noah walked from their camp to Baker Lake in March to seek help. They were airlifted by the Canadian armed forces to Baker Lake.

== Baker Lake ==
When Oonark first arrived in Baker Lake in 1958 she survived by "cleaning skins for her friend, Sandy Lunan, at the Hudson's Bay Company post, cooking meals, washing dishes and sewing traditional Arctic garments for local sale" and eventually worked as janitor at the Anglican Church. Baker Lake residents derisively referred to the Back River people as qangmaliqs (the people who only come in to trade) and considered them to be socially backwards.

In the 1950s, because of a severe famine in the Keewatin District, many Inuit arrived in Baker Lake. A federal day school was opened at Baker Lake in 1957. Pre-fabricated subsidized government housing constructed from the mid-1950s. The Northern Services Officer—Doug Wilkinson— encouraged the development of the arts and crafts industry in Baker Lake. At that time the Department of Northern Affairs and National Resources (DIAND) established arts and crafts projects in Inuit hamlets as part of socioeconomic development (Goetz, 1985:43). Bill Larmour was the DIAND arts and crafts officer in Baker Lake from 1961 to 1962.

== Artistic career ==
In 1958, after observing school children drawing in Baker Lake, Oonark casually remarked to the school teacher that she could draw better than that. The next summer in 1959, the teacher shared this comment with Canadian Wildlife Service biologist, Dr. Andrew Macpherson, who was in Baker Lake studying Arctic fox. Macpherson gave her coloured pencils and paper, purchased her drawings and brought some of them to Ottawa. Macpherson continued to send her coloured pencils and a drawing pad after his return to Ottawa in the late fall of 1959. In the spring of 1960, Oonark sent him twelve completed drawings in the sketchbook via the Northern Services Officer Tom Butlers.

Edith Dodds, the wife of the Northern Service Officer, Sam Dodds, sent six of Oonark's drawings to James Archibald Houston at the West Baffin Co-operative in Cape Dorset. Two of her drawings—Inland Eskimo Woman/Eskimo Woman and Tattooed Faces— were made into single colour stone cut prints under the name of Una (Kazan River) at the newly established Cape Dorset print shop and included in the 1960 Cape Dorset print collection and catalogue. A print from her drawing "People of lnland” appeared in the 1961 Cape Dorset Print collection. It was the first and only time the Cape Dorset print shop included work from an Inuk outside Cape Dorset.

In 1961, William Larmour, crafts officer with the Department of Indian and Northern Affairs established a federal government arts and crafts program with Jessie Oonark as one of their key artists. In 1963 Gabriel Gely developed a printmaking program in Baker Lake. Ten experimental prints were made in 1964 and two of them were based on Oonark's drawings—"Drum Dancer" (1964).

Boris Kotelewetz, the Department of Indian and Northern Affairs' arts and crafts officer, who arrived in Baker Lake in March 1966, provided Oonark with studio space and a salary.

In 1969, Jack and Sheila Butler were recruited as the new DIAND arts and crafts officers on the advice of George Swinton, artist, academic, collector of Inuit art, author of the influential book entitled Sculpture of the Eskimo. By the time they arrived Oonark was already an accomplished artist. In that year she completed a large appliqué wall hanging which hangs in the Northwest Territories Legislative Assembly's Chamber in Yellowknife.

In 1970, the first Baker Lake Print Collection was released and exhibited at the Art Gallery of Alberta. The stone cut print by Thomas Manik of Oonark's drawing entitled "Woman" (1970) was featured on the cover and her work was prominent in the exhibition. She continued to contribute images to the Baker Lake Print collections until 1985.

In 1970, the National Museum of Man in Ottawa organized a touring exhibition of 50 of Oonark's drawings and works by sculptor John Pangnark. It toured major galleries in Canada for eight months. Later that year, Avrom Isaacs featured Inuit artists such as Oonark and Karoo Ashevak in solo exhibitions in 1970 in the Isaacs Innuit Gallery—in the gallery's opening year. Isaacs Innuit Gallery became one of Toronto's most prestigious galleries for over thirty years. It was Oonark's first solo exhibition and in 1971 Isaacs had an exhibition of Oonark's wall hangings.

The Baker Lake Sanavik Co-operative was incorporated in 1971. The print-makers who rendered Oonark's drawings into limited edition fine art prints included Thomas Sivuraq. The printing technique in Baker Lake included colour stonecuts, stencil and lithograph on Japanese wove paper. These include the chop for Oonark and Sanavik. In the same year, Oonark received a travel grant from the Canada Council of the Arts to travel to Toronto and Montreal for the opening of the exhibitions of her drawings. The Toronto wall hangings solo-exhibition took place in April at the Innuit Gallery of Eskimo Art. In Montreal, the exhibition was held at the Canadian Guild of Crafts.

Oonark's work illustrated a 1972 anthology of Inuit poetry from the circumpolar regions including Alaska, Canada, Greenland and Siberia 1972. In the spring of 1972, Baker Lake print collection was released and it included five Oonark prints, two of which are based on small wall hangings. The stencil print, Young Woman, was featured on the cover of the catalogue. Later that year, an Oonark wall hanging was commissioned by the Ivey Business School, University of Western Ontario, was featured on the cover of their publication, The Business Quarterly.

In May 1975, Oonark was elected a Member of the Royal Canadian Academy of Arts. Later that year, the Baker Lake print collection is released featuring 11 Oonark prints, a new record for the artist. By 1976, Oonark was well known in her community. That year, her work was featured on two stamps for the United Nations commemorating the United Nations Conference on Human Settlements. The first day of Issue was May 28, 1976.

In 1984, she was made an Officer of the Order of Canada.

In 1986, the Winnipeg Art Gallery mounted a retrospective of her work with a major touring exhibition and catalogue both entitled Jessie Oonark: a Retrospective. By 1987 Oonark already has had eleven solo exhibitions and more than fifty national and international group exhibitions.

In 1998, the Macdonald Stewart Art Centre presented a major exhibition with catalogue entitled Qamanittuaq (Where the River Widens): Drawings by Baker Lake Artists which including first-generation artist Jessie Oonark and the distinctive drawings of four of her children: Janet Kigusiuq, Victoria Mamnguqsualuk, Nancy Pukingrnak, and William Noah among many others.

In 1994, Bernadette Driscoll-Ellgelstad, curated the exhibition entitled Northern Lights: Inuit Textile Art from Arctic Canada which included wall hangings by Jessie Oonark and her daughters, Janet Kigusiuq, Victoria Mamnguqsllaluk, her relatives Ruth Qaulluaryuk and other women from the Back River area along with artists from Baker Lake.

On 18 November 2015, Oonark's 1969 wall hanging depicting a hunting scene, made of duffel, felt and embroidery floss, sold for $70,800, a new record for the Baker Lake artist. The wall hanging was one of 333 pieces of art up for sale, organized by Walker's Fine Art Auctions in Ottawa.

== Style ==
A strong, bold graphic sense informs all of Oonark's work. Traditional dress, women's facial tattoos, and shamanistic themes are common in her art, yet they usually appear as isolated, fragmentary forms, shaped into a graphically bold image rather than a comprehensible narrative. Oonark is also well known as a textile artist, whose wool and felt wall-hangings reveal her as a master of color and form.

— Janet Catherine Berlo

== Themes in her artwork ==
Oonark's work includes visual puns and shape-shifting, descriptive works depicting clothing, tools and cultural objects of importance to the Utkuhihalingmiut as well as images based on storytelling, legends and shamanism.

=== Visual puns or ambiguous images ===
Mame Jackson, George Swinton and Jean Blodgett noted that Oonark's work reflects a high tolerance for ambiguity, a kind of double vision. For example, her work entitled "Two Fish Looking for Something to Eat" (1978), when viewed as a horizontal image, suggests two swimming fish-like creatures and depicts her version of the cannibal fish legend. When viewed vertically one figure resembles a standing woman whose face fills the amaut. Is she birthing or eating the small blue fish? The fish-figure wearing a man's parka seems to be kiss-touching rather than eating.

Jessie Oonark, although familiar with oral traditions and legends, is never satisfied with a one-layered literal illustration. The horizontal print Two Fish Looking for Something to Eat depicts her version of the cannibal fish story but her double vision leaves room for ambiguity. The cannibal fish also appears in her print "Untitled (Yellow fish)" (1977).

Jessie Oonark's verbal descriptions of her own work are often cryptic,

"These are sea creatures, and they are sort of eating one another. There is a story, and that is it that one whole person along with a qayak was swallowed up by some giant fish or creature or whatever – somewhere near Gjoa Haven or Back River."

— Oonark in Jackson 1983:39

=== Shamanism ===
Oonark's father Aglaguaq and her grandfather were said to be shamans. Aglaguaq had a daughter who is Oonark's stepsister, Kayuruq. When Janet Kigusiuk was still a baby, Anglican missionaries, Canon James and his Inuk assistant catechist Thomas Tapatai came to Oonark's hunting camp. She adopted the Anglican religion and they gave her a prayer book and a Bible. The arrival of Christian missionaries divided their small camp into two divisions—those who became Christian and those who held onto the old ways. Oonark did not participate in drum dancing nor did she follow the ways of shamanism. However she continued to depict the drum dance and aspects of shamanism in her artwork such as Horned Spirits (1970), Shaman (1970) and The People Within (1970).

The colour stonecut and stencil print on laid Japanese paper printed by Thomas Sivuraq of a drawing by Jessie Oonark called "A Shaman's Helping Spirits" (1971), in the permanent collection of the National Gallery of Canada depicts a horned shaman, with animal helping spirits and with a small spirit on his head. Oonark's father—Aglaquarq—used his shamanic powers infrequently but Oonark vividly remembered his helping spirit— Uupitanaisuak.

"It was small and wore a baby caribou-skin hat. They asked me if I wanted to have it. I saw it from a distance and it almost came near me, but I didn't want to have a spirit helper."

— Jessie Oonark in Bouochard 1987

=== Drum Dance ===
She no longer participated in the drum dance either but she depicted images of the drum dance for example in "Drum Dance" (1970).

Shape-shifting was a popular theme seen in Day Spirit (1970).

=== Inuit storytelling ===
Oonark's mother and father and her mother-in-law Naatak, (Natak) were storytellers and these stories are richly represented in Oonark's work, such as the 1970 print entitled "Dream of the Bird Woman", referring to the Kiviuq (Qiviuk), an Inuk who faced dangerous obstacles in his journeys by kayak, which was described by Franz Boas as the most widely known Inuit legend in the circumpolar region.

=== Clothing and tools ===
The knife used by women, the ulu, their clothing, the amauti were recurring themes in her work. People of the Inland (1961) depicts the Back River people. One of her best known works is "Woman" (1970) described as,

"Geometry, abstraction, design and activated symmetry are all combined to bring out the very real image of a woman in her winter dress. The brilliant colours emphasize the contrasting shades of caribou skin, beautifully assembled to form a traditional design on the parka. With this print Oonark set a style for herself to which she has remained true – strong and explicit use of line, an intelligent positioning of mass and daring choice of colour."

— Furneaux and Rosshandler 1974

=== Birds ===
Bernadette Driscoll explained the presence of birds — in the drawing and print "Dream of the Bird Woman" and in Oonark's other artworks — demonstrated the "symbolic significance of the importance of birds as a symbol of flight and in several instances as a reference to shamanism as in "Angagkok Conjuring Birds (1979) but also as a harbinger of spring and itself a symbol of fecundity and rebirth."

=== Christianity ===
Reverend Alan Whitton was the Anglican minister at Saint Aidan's Church, Baker Lake, from 1963 until 1972. During that time his wife Elizabeth Whitton, befriended Oonark. In 1966 Elizabeth organized a sewing projects with Oonark and others where they produced mittens, parkas, slippers, duffel socks as well as appliquéd images from scraps for sale. At Easter in 1968 Elizabeth Whitton asked Oonark to do drawings about their church for their local women's auxiliary magazine. Oonark's drawings included depictions of Reverend Whitton, catechist Thomas Tapatai, local Inuit parishioners including women with traditional Inuit tattoos and the church exterior. Oonark continued to use these themes in later work, for example in her 1971–1972 wall hanging for Saint Jude's Cathedral in Iqaluit and in a 1971–1972 wall hanging of wool and stroud in the permanent collection of the Art Gallery of Ontario. Oonark described this wall-hanging,

"I was more thinking of people on the journey and seeing different tribes of different people, sort of walking between the hills or mountains. Those two women on the way back corners have the latest clothes from the Cambridge Bay area, and then next to her is a young one. Every young person seems to have those kind of parkas with a long tail and sort of a straight cut."

— Oonark interviewed by Mame Jackson 1983

In her 1984 essay entitled "Christianity and Inuit Art" and in the 1986 "Jessie Oonark, A Retrospective", Blodgett noted how Oonark blended traditional Inuit clothing and symbols with Christian motifs.

== Oonark's influence on Inuit art ==
In the first generation of Inuit artists working in printmaking, Oonark, together with Pitseolak Ashoona and Kenojuak were recognized quickly as significant figures, receiving solo exhibitions, scholarly attention and professional awards. Rosemary Tovell wrote in the catalogue entitled Baker Lake Prints 1985 that When Oonark died in 1985, the Canadian Eskimo Art Council (CEAC) were quoted as saying that they were pleased with the quality of her last prints and they recognized that "[W]ithout Oonark, Baker Lake as a centre for prints may never have happened. It was largely due to her enormous talent that the world's attention came to the community."

On September 4, 2016, the CBC released an article titled, "Inuit Art Centre to Reveal Beauty of the North in the South" discussing Winnipeg's $65-million centre that will house the world's largest collection of Inuit art. In it, they reference the important role printmaking played, especially for female artists like Oonark, Kenojuak Ashevak and Helen Kalvak, who gravitated towards visual arts, while men focused on stone-carving which required more physical strength.

All her children, Janet Kigusiuq, Victoria Mamnguqsualuq Kayuryuk, Josiah Nuilalik, Nancy Pukirniq, Miriam Marealik Qiyuk, Peggy, Mary Yussipik and William Noah are artists.

== Collections ==
Oonark's work is in major collections including the Agnes Etherington Art Centre, Queen's University, (Kingston, ON), American National Insurance Company, Amon Carter Museum of Western Art (Fort Worth, Texas), Amway Environmental Foundation Collection (Ada, Michigan), Art Gallery of Greater Victoria (Victoria, BC), Art Gallery of Nova Scotia (Halifax, NS), Art Gallery of Ontario (Toronto, ON), Art Gallery of Windsor, Art Gallery of York University (Downsview, ON), Beaverbrook Art Gallery (Fredericton, NB), Canada Council Art Bank (Ottawa, ON), Canadian Catholic Conference Art Collection (Ottawa, ON), Canadian Guild of Crafts Quebec (Montreal, QC), Canadian Museum of Civilization (Hull, QC), Churchill Community Centre (Churchill, MB), Clifford E. Lee Collection (University of Alberta, Edmonton, AB), Collection of His Holiness John Paul II (Vatican City, Rome, Italy), Collection of the Supreme Patriarch of All Armenia, His Holiness, Catholicos Vazken I, Dennos Museum Center, Northwestern Michigan College (Traverse City, Michigan), Edmonton Art Gallery (Edmonton, AB), Glenbow Museum (Calgary, AB), Haffenreffer Museum of Anthropology (Brown University, Bristol, Rhode Island), Kitchener-Waterloo Art Gallery (Kitchener, ON), Klamer Family Collection, Art Gallery of Ontario (Toronto, ON), Macdonald Stewart Art Centre (Guelph, ON), McMaster University Art Gallery (Hamilton, ON), McMichael Canadian Art Collection (Kleinburg, ON) Mendel Art Gallery, (Saskatoon, SK), Museé des beaux-arts de Montreal (Montreal, QC), Museum of Anthropology, University of British Columbia (Vancouver, BC), National Arts Centre (Ottawa, ON), National Gallery of Canada (Ottawa, ON), New Brunswick Museum (Saint John, NB), Owens Art Gallery, Mount Allison University (Sackville, NB), Prince of Wales Northern Heritage Centre (Yellowknife, NT), Shell Canada Collection (Calgary, AB), Simon Fraser Gallery, Simon Fraser University (Burnaby, BC), University of Alberta (Edmonton, AB), University of Lethbridge Art Gallery (Lethbridge, AB), Whyte Museum of the Canadian Rockies (Banff, AB) and the Winnipeg Art Gallery (Winnipeg, MB) and the Hermon Collection of Native American Art at the University of Delaware Art Gallery. Her untitled wall hanging (1973), one of her largest art works, is in the main lobby (foyer) of the National Arts Centre in Ottawa.

== Later life ==
Oonark began to experience numbness in her hands and feet and in 1979, when a surgical intervention failed to check the symptoms, she lost much of her manual dexterity and produced only a few more pieces afterwards. Her career had lasted roughly 19 years, but its impact on Inuit art – and on the perception of Inuit art in the larger world – is considerable. She died March 7, 1985, in Churchill, Manitoba. and is buried on Blueberry Hill in Baker Lake.

== See also ==
- Notable Aboriginal people of Canada
