= Janet Nungnik =

Inuk textile artist

Janet Anautilik Nungnik
- Born: 1954 (age 71–72); Kivalliq Region of Nunavut, Canada
- Occupation: Artist
- Spouse: Nick Nungnik

Janet Nungnik (born 1954) or Janet Anautalik Nungnik is an Inuk textile artist who lives and works in Qamani’tuaq, which is also known as Baker Lake, Nunavut, Canada. She is known for her colourful applique and embroidery works that display landscapes and everyday rural arctic life.

== Biography ==
In 1954, Nungnik was born in Ariaut Anautalik, which is a small camp west of the Hudson Bay, in the Kivalliq region of Nunavut. she lived a semi-nomadic life with her parents, Martha Tiktak Anautalik and William Anautalik, and her older sister Vera, and her younger brother Eric. She is of the Ihalmiut and Padlermiut peoples which are a part of the Caribou Inuit. Nungnik attended elementary school in Qamani’tuaq(Baker's Lake), middle school in Churchill, Manitoba and high school in Yellowknife. Nungnik's father insisted that the three children continue to speak and write in Inuktitut despite learning English in school. Nungnik started sewing wall hangings in 1970 after, helping care for textile artist Jessie Oonark and observing her work. Nungnik also observed and worked with her own mother, Martha Tiktak Anautalik.

=== Early life ===
Ariaut Anautalik was such a remote region and small settlement that for the first several years of her life Nungnik grew up thinking that her family members were the only people in existence. There was a famine in this region in the late 1950s, when caribou herds changed their migratory routes, which left inhabitants without a food source. Despite what may have been seen as a difficult life style, Nungnik describes feeling safe and happy during this period. Nungnik's early years from Ariaut Anautalik were important to her and they have inspired many textile works. These depict scenes of her mother drying fish, her skipping rope made from caribou hide, her father coming back from trading and bringing items that were not made by the family, and scenes such as walking in the tundra or sleeping in their igloo.

=== Moving to Qamani’tuaq/ Baker Lake ===
When Nungnik was six or seven a red plane landed near her settlement. Inside the plane were government agents who had come to take the three children to school. Not only was this the first time that she had seen a plane, but also the first time she had seen white people. Somehow her had father managed to arrange for the whole family to move inland to Baker Lake and the children to attend day school rather than have the children attend residential school, a system that has been accused of cultural genocide and where many children suffered abuse. Nungnik, her brother and sister were flown to Baker Lake alone and held in foster care for the months before her parents were able to travel across the snow to arrive and reunite the family.

== Artwork ==
Nungnik creates appliqué wall hangings on wool duffel out of embroidery floss, cloth, and beads. Her wall hangings include landscape and narrative scenes from her everyday life and are a mixture of realistic imagery with relative sizes and perspectives that do not follow western realism tradition. Many of her works are displayed with poetry that is created concurrently with the textiles, where the words of the poems reflect on the narrative within the image.

== Solo exhibitions ==
- Janet Nungnik: Revelations, McMichael Canadian Art Collection, June 8 - January 5, 2020
- The Eagle's Shadow, Marion Scott Gallery, March 30 - April 27, 2019
- Works on Cloth, Marion Scott Gallery, July 27 - Aug 30, 2002

== Collections ==
Nungnik's work can be found in the textile Museum of Canada, Art Gallery of Guelph,
