= Victoria Mamnguqsualuk =

Canadian Inuk artist (1930–2016)

- ᕕᐃᑎᕋᐊ ᒪᒍᓯᐊᓗ
- Born: 1930
- Died: 2016 (aged 85–86); Baker Lake
- Spouse: Samson Kayuryuk
- Children: Thomas Kabloona; Simon Kayuryuk; Paul Aglakuaq Kayuryuk; Kate Kayuryuk; Mercy Kayuryuk; Moses Kayuryuk; Delores Kayuryuk; Zachary Kayuryuk; Shawnee Kayuryuk
- Mother: Jessie Oonark
- Relatives: Janet Kigusiuq; Nancy Pukingrnak Aupaluktuq; Peggy Qablunaaq Aittauq; Mary Yuusipik Singaqti; Josiah Nuilaalik; Miriam Marealik Qiyuk; William Noah

Victoria Mamnguqsualuk (sometimes Mamnguksualuk) (Inuktitut syllabics: ᕕᐃᑎᕋᐊ ᒪᒍᓯᐊᓗ) (1930-2016) was one of the best-known Canadian Inuit artists of her generation.

== Early life ==
Born near Garry Lake, Mamnguqsualuk had a nomadic youth until her thirties, when, in 1963, to avoid starvation, her family moved to Baker Lake. Mamnguqsualuk is one of noted Inuk artist Jessie Oonark's eight artistically gifted children; among her siblings are the artists Nancy Pukingrnak, Josiah Nuilaalik, Janet Kigusiuq, Mary Yuusipik Singaqti, Miriam Nanurluk, and William Noah. Her husband, Samson Kayuryuk, and son, Paul Aglakuaq Kayuryuk, are also artists. Her granddaughter, Gayle Uyagaqi Kabloona is also an artist.

== Work ==
She is best known for her silkscreen and stencil, prints, but has worked in sculpture, drawings, and fabrics as well. Mamnguqsualuk's bold depictions of Inuit myth have been widely praised. Like her mother, she moves easily between the realms of graphic arts and textiles. Eight of her prints were part of the first print edition from Baker Lake, in 1970, and her pieces have appeared in many collections since then. Her work is informed by some of the stylistic tropes of European art. In her painting Shaman Caribou, Mamnguqsualuk has created a complex composition that illustrates many aspects of the Inuit Shaman's world.

== Collections ==
Mamnguqsualuk's work is in the collections of:

- the Winnipeg Art Gallery,
- the Canadian Museum of Civilization,
- the Macdonald Stewart Art Centre,
- the McMichael Collection,
- the National Gallery of Canada, and
- the Glenbow Museum.
