= Skyroof =

Skyroof may refer to:

- Skylight, a window, dome, or opening in a roof or ceiling to admit natural light
- Sunroof, an opening in an automobile roof which allows light and/or fresh air to enter the vehicle
- Roof window, an outward opening window that is incorporated as part of the design of a roof

== See also ==
- Skylight (disambiguation)
