= Janet Kigusiuq =

Canadian Inuk artist (1926–2005)

- Born: 1926; Putuqsuqniq (now in Nunavut), Canada
- Died: 2005 (aged 78–79); Baker Lake, Nunavut, Canada
- Known for: Printmaking, Drawing
- Spouse: Mark Uqayuittuq

Janet Kigusiuq (b. 1926 Putuqsuqniq camp, near Garry Lake, then in Northwest Territories now in Nunavut; d. February 27, 2005 Baker Lake, Nunavut) was an Inuk artist.

Kigusiuq came from a large family of artists: she was the eldest daughter of Jessie Oonark, her siblings included artists Victoria Mamnguqsualuk, Nancy Pukingrnak, Peggy Qablunaaq Aittauq, Mary Yuusipik Singaqti, Josiah Nuilaalik, Miriam Marealik Qiyuk, and William Noah, and she was married to Mark Uqayuittuq, son of Luke Anguhadluq, themselves both artists.

== Biography ==
Kigusiuq's family were relocated to Qamani’tuaq (Baker Lake) She was married at the age of 11.

In 1967, Kigusiuq began to draw to supplement her family's income after encouragement from her mother.

== Work ==
Kigusiuq's bright, bold and graphic work focused on camp life activities like hunting and fishing and supernatural forms inspired by Inuit spirituality and stories. The source of these motifs are principally drawn from childhood experiences at the family camp, Kitikat in the Back River region.

Throughout her career she experimented with many artistic mediums, including drawing, print, textiles, wall hangings. She adopted printmaking following the family's move to Baker Lake and between 1970 and 1988 she contributed to the Baker Lake print collections.

In 1984, Kigusiuq delivered a copy of her mother's work Giver of Life to Pope John Paul II in Ottawa, Ontario as a gift from the Canadian Inuit.

Her mature work saw the development of pencil crayon colour fields and collage techniques, the latter prompted by the onset of arthritis.

=== Selected exhibitions ===
- Janet Kigusiuq: Recent Drawings. 1996. Winnipeg Art Gallery, Winnipeg, MB.
- The Urge to Abstraction: The Graphic Art of Janet Kigusiuq. 2008, Museum of Inuit Art.
- New Lines: Contemporary Drawings from the National Gallery of Canada. June - Oct 2014. Art Gallery of Alberta
- Janet Kigusiuq. June 8 - September 26, 2019, The Art Gallery of Ontario.
- Breaking Ground: Freda Diesing, Helen Kalvak, Janet Kigusiuq, Rita Letendre. September–November 2019. National Arts Centre.

=== Collections ===
Her work can be found in a number of museum and gallery permanent collections such as:

- The National Gallery of Canada in Ottawa, ON
- The Macdonald Steward Art Centre, Guelph, ON
- The Museum of Inuit Art in Toronto, ON
- The Winnipeg Art Gallery in Winnipeg, MB.
- The Musée national des beaux-arts du Québec in Quebec City, Quebec
- Feheley Fine Arts in Toronto, ON
