= Elizabeth Angrnaqquaq =

Inuk textile artist

- Born: Anakoak/Arngnatkoak/Arnatquaq; 1916; Nunavut, Canada
- Died: 2003 (aged 86–87)
- Style: Textile

Elizabeth Angrnaqquaq (1916–2003) was an innovative Canadian Inuk textile artist active from the 1970s to early 2000s. Angnaqquaq's work explores textile creations while experimenting with non-traditional methods. Her style has been described as painterly for the way in which she fills the space between her figures and animals with embroidery.

== Early life ==
Angrnaqquaq was born in 1916 in the Northwest Territories, Canada in a traditional nomadic camp. She and her younger siblings were raised by their father after their mother died young. She lived a traditional Inuit lifestyle until the early she and her family moved to Baker Lake, Northwest Territories (now in Nunavut) in the 1950s to avoid poverty and starvation. Her son Harold worked at the sewing center in the late 1960s. In Baker Lake, Angrnaqquaq explored textile and mixed-media art practices where she used stitching as a method for creating figures in fabrics. Angrnaqquaq obtained fabrics through Jack and Sheila Butler, visiting art advisors to the Baker Lake region.

== Career ==
After establishing an art practice in which Angrnaqquaq explored figures of landscapes, animals, and textures through herringbone stitching, she began showing her works at Art Institutions around Canada. After establishing her art practice in textiles throughout Canada, Angenaqquaq was commissioned to create a public art commission for the Post Office at Wakefield, Ontario through the Public Works Department in 1976. Her work has been exhibited throughout North America, specifically in Toronto, San Francisco, New York, Los Angeles, and Winnipeg in both private and public commissions.

Animals and People (2000)

Angrnaqquaq worked well into her 80s, producing her last work in 2000. The work, entitled Animals and People, explores bright colours and the situation of animal forms within an abstracted landscape. Animals and People was rendered in the same herringbone stitch which Angrnaqquaq was known for.

Angrnaqquaq died in 2003.

== Permanent collections ==
- National Gallery of Canada
- Winnipeg Art Gallery
- Canada Council Art Bank

== List of temporary exhibitions ==
- "Eskimo Wallhangings", McIntosh Gallery, University of Western Ontario
- "Baker Lake Wallhangings 1976", The Guild Shop
- "Baker Lake Wallhangings 1978", The Inuit Gallery of Eskimo Art
- "Artisans '78", Canadian Crafts Council Northwest Territories
- "Baker Lake Prints, Sculpture, Wallhangings", The Raven
- "Baker Lake Wallhangings 1979", The Arctic Circle
- "Baker Lake Wallhangings 1979", Kaiser House Gallery
- "Baker Lake Wallhangings 1979", Vancouver Art Gallery
- "Baker Lake Wallhangings 1980", Margot Galleries
- "Baker Lake Wallhangings 1981", Inuit Gallery of Vancouver
- "Baker Lake Wallhangings 1981", Tundra Gallery
- "Keewatin District Wallhangings 1979", Kaiser House Gallery
- "Mary Wolf Ceramics and Canadian Eskimo Wallhangings", Franz Bader Gallery
- "The Spirit of the Land", The Koffler Gallery
- "Wallhangings Embroidered and Appliqued by Elizabeth Angrnatquaq of Baker Lake", The Inuit Gallery of Eskimo Art
- "Embroidered and Appliqued Wallhangings by Elizabeth Angrnatquaq", The Inuit Gallery of Eskimo Art
- "Spirits and Dreams - Arts of the Inuit of Baker Lake", Department of Indian Affairs and Northern Development
- "Baker Lake Wallhangings", The Inuit Gallery of Eskimo Art
- "Elizabeth Angrnaqquaq Wall Hangings", The Upstairs Gallery
- "Embroidered and Appliqued Wallhangings from Baker Lake", The Inuit Gallery of Eskimo Art
- "Women of the North: An Exhibition of art by Inuit Women of the Canadian Arctic", Marion Scott Gallery
- "Northern Lights: Inuit Textile Art from the Canadian Arctic", Baltimore Museum of Art
- "Arctic Mystery, Harmony and Transformation, Baker Lake Textile Art", Art Gallery of the Canadian Embassy
