= Moses Aupaluktuq =

Canadian Inuk

Member of the Legislative Assembly of Nunavut
- In office October 27, 2008 – 2013
- Preceded by: David Simailak
- Succeeded by: Simeon Mikkungwak
- Constituency: Baker Lake

Personal details
- Born: Churchill, Manitoba
- Party: non-partisan consensus government

Moses Aupaluktuq is a territorial politician from Baker Lake, Nunavut, Canada. He served as a member of the Legislative Assembly of Nunavut from 2008 to 2013.

== Political career ==
Aupaluktuq ran for a seat to the Nunavut Legislature as a candidate in the Baker Lake in the 2008 territorial election. He defeated incumbent David Simailak in a hotly contested three-way race taking just over 41% of the popular vote.

Aupaluktuq also served as president and chairman of the board of directors of the Kivalliq Partners in Development Corporation (2005-2008). He also served as the first president of the National Inuit Youth Council (1994-1996) as well as the vice-president of the Inuit Youth Circumpolar Conference (1994-1996), board member of the Inuit Tapiriit Kanatami (1994-1996), and resident of the Kivalliq Hall Student Residence Council (1991-1992)

== Criminal charges ==
The Royal Canadian Mounted Police charged him with liquor related offences on two separate occasions. The first offence occurred on November 7, 2009. The RCMP charged him with a drunk driving offence after he was found sleeping in his vehicle. The vehicle was stuck in snow, on a driveway, on private property. He claimed he had no keys to enter his home in the community of Baker Lake, Nunavut.

Aupaluktuq contested the impaired driving charge, stating that the incident happened as the vehicle was stuck in snow in driveway on private residence property and the vehicle had already been in the driveway the day before. No mention was made as to whether the vehicle was running at the time of the offence.

His second charge came on October 1, 2010, where he was charged with unlawful possession of liquor. A liquor permit was proven later and charges dropped.
