= Kiviuq =

Hero of Inuit legends

Kiviuq (Inuktitut: ᑭᕕᐅᖅ), also spelled Qiviuq, Kiviok and other variants, is a legendary hero of the epic stories of the Inuit of the Arctic regions of northern Canada, Alaska and Greenland. Versions of his adventures vary with the location and the storyteller. In Greenland, he is known as Qooqa. In Alaska, he is called Qayaq, which is short for Qayaqtuaġiŋñaqtuaq ("He who shall always long to go roaming in his qayaq").

== Story ==
Kiviuq is an eternal Inuk wanderer. Spirits, giants, cannibals, bears and sea monsters intermingle in Kiviuq's world, creating havoc for him. He walks, or travels by dog sled, kayak (qajaq), or may be borne by huge fishes. He fights with a harpoon and his supernatural powers allow him to overcome all manner of obstacles in his travels across the north.

== Franz Boas ==
Franz Boas identified the Kiviuk legend as one of the best known of the circumpolar Inuit adventure hunter-hero-traveler legends.

The best known of these is perhaps the story of Kiviuk, who went out in his kayak, and, after passing many dangerous obstructions, reached a coast, where he fell in with an old witch, who killed her visitors with her sharp tail, by sitting on them. After escaping from her by covering his chest with a flat stone, he came to two women who lived by themselves, and whom he assisted in obtaining fish. Finally he traveled home and found his son grown up. Characteristic of Greenland are the numerous traditions of visits to a country beyond the sea, and of adventures there. These do not seem to be so common among the central tribes, although among them similar tales are not missing. An example of these is the tale of two sisters who were carried away by the ice to the land beyond the sea, where they subsisted for some time on salmon and seals which they caught. They were discovered by two men whom they married. They gave birth to two daughters, whereupon the husband of the one threatened to kill his wife if she should give birth to another daughter. Therefore they made their escape back to their own country across the ice. Their brother, induced by their tales of the abundance of game in the country across the sea, set out on a visit, giving his boat three coverings, which he cut off in succession when they became wet. He caught much game, and killed the men who had threatened his sisters by causing them to drink water mixed with caribou-hair taken from the stocking of a dead person. By this means the enemies were transformed into caribou, which he shot.

— Franz Boas, 1904

== Versions of the legend ==
One well-known legend of Kiviuq tells of his friendship with the grandson of an old woman. Everyone abuses and makes fun of the boy except Kiviuq. The old woman decides to get revenge. She changes her grandson into a seal and has him swim out to sea. The men follow the seal, intending to hunt it. Before the hunters reach it, however, the old woman creates a storm and drowns everyone but the seal and Kiviuq. The seal swims safely back to shore, where the old woman turns him back into a boy. Kiviuq drifts away in his kayak continuing his adventures and living with people of many foreign lands.

=== Netsilik ===
In a story from the Netsilik people, the world ends when Kiviuq's face transforms completely into stone. Currently, after about 100 years of change, his face is half stone.

Inuit elders say that he is in his last life now, on an adventure somewhere. However, before he dies he will return to see his people. Oral tradition has preserved many versions of the Kiviuq story-cycle, and today, a new generation of Inuit storytellers is bringing the tales to life in written or graphic form.

Qikiqtaarjuk, once a Hudson Bay island and now a peninsula, is associated with Kiviuq.

=== Kivalliq ===
In the Kivalliq Region, the story tells of an orphan boy who lived with his grandmother. The boy would be teased and bullied every day by other boys. He would go home crying every day with ripped clothes. His poor grandmother would have to sew perfectly good clothes every day with her poor eyesight. She grew tired of all the bullying her grandson went through that she had a plan.

There was a seal that had been caught for them as they couldn't provide for themselves. With that seal, she asked her grandson to skin it carefully and not to puncture any holes in the skin. So as she said, the boy skinned it carefully and with no punctures. Then she asked him to put the skin on and make sure he could see through the little eye holes as if he were a seal. He followed her instructions, then he was asked to put his head in a pail of water and stay in there until he needed to breathe again. So the boy did as his grandmother asked and after he did it, he had to do it over and over until he could stay in the water so long that the sun had moved when he finally comes up for air. The grandmother was so satisfied that she told him to secretly go into the water with the seal skin on and get the mean boys to notice him as if he were a seal. After he gets noticed, he had to lure them out to the ocean. The boy did what his grandmother told him to do. The mean boys noticed him and thought he was a seal. Among the mean boys were Kiviuq and his brother.

After he lured them out to sea, they say he waved his arms and legs and cried as if he was a baby and asked for the wind to come. It is believed that when you were born and whatever the weather is on that day, it belongs to you. So in this case, the boy called for the wind and it came to him drowning all the mean boys but Kiviuq.

Kiviuq was a strong boy; he fought and fought against the waves. He did this for many days until he found land. It is believed that he is still out there living, so old that he is hard as stone, but his heart is still beating. If his heart stops beating, they say the world will end.

== In Inuit art ==
The Kiviok legend is depicted in numerous works by Canadian Inuit artists such as Jessie Oonark (1906-1985) and her daughters, Janet Kigusiuq, Victoria Mamnguqsualuk, and Miriam Marealik Qiyuk.

Kigusiuq and Mamnguqsllaluk learned the stories from their grandparents in the 1930s and 1940s. Oonark's mother and father and her mother-in-law Naatak, were storytellers who shared them with their grandchildren. Oonark's well-known drawing and 1970 print by the same name–"Dream of the Bird Woman"–refers to the Kiviuq (Qiviuk)., an Inuk who faced dangerous obstacles in his journeys by kayak, which was described by Franz Boas as the most widely known Inuit legend in the circumpolar region.
