= Glenn McLean =

Canadian politician

MLA for Baker Lake
- In office 1999–2004
- Preceded by: new district
- Succeeded by: David Simailak

Personal details
- Born: May 10, 1953 (age 72) Whitehorse, Yukon
- Party: non-partisan consensus government
- Occupation: Entrepreneur

Glenn McLean is a former territorial level politician in Canada. He served as a member of the Legislative Assembly of Nunavut from 1999 until 2004.

McLean ran for a seat in the 1999 Nunavut general election. He won the Baker Lake electoral district in a landslide with 64% of the popular vote defeating two other candidates. He ran on the promise that he would stick to press the government to tackle issues affecting the Baker Lake, Nunavut and not join the Executive council in order to stay in the constituency rather than move to Iqaluit the capital.

McLean chose not to run again for office again when the legislature was dissolved in 2004 citing family as his primary reason.
