= Marie Kuunnuaq =

Canadian Inuk artist

- Born: December 21, 1933
- Died: March 1990
- Known for: Textile artist Sculptor

Marie Kuunnuaq (December 21, 1933 – March, 1990) was a Canadian Inuk artist.

Born in the vicinity of Mallery Lake, Kuunnuaq later moved to Baker Lake, where she lived with her husband and seven children until her death. She was known for her sculptures and for her appliquéd wall hangings, and her work was featured in many shows across Canada, the United States, and Greenland, including three solo exhibits. The Winnipeg Art Gallery, the Canada Council Art Bank, and the Inuit Cultural Institute are among organizations holding examples of her art.
