= Craig Simailak =

Canadian politician

The Honourable Craig Simailak MLA

Member of the Legislative Assembly of Nunavut for Baker Lake
- Incumbent
- Assumed office July 24, 2020
- Preceded by: Simeon Mikkungwak

Member of the Executive Council of Nunavut
- Incumbent
- Assumed office November 20, 2025

Personal details
- Born: Craig Atangalaaq Simailak
- Party: non-partisan consensus government

Craig Atangalaaq Simailak is a Canadian politician, who was elected to the Legislative Assembly of Nunavut in July 2020. Representing the electoral district of Baker Lake, he was directly acclaimed to office as the only candidate to register by the nomination deadline following the resignation of his predecessor Simeon Mikkungwak.

He previously served on the municipal council of Baker Lake, including a stint as deputy mayor.

He is the son of David Simailak, who previously represented Baker Lake in the legislature from 2004 to 2008.
