= Jack Butler (artist) =

American-Canadian visual artist (1937–2024)

- Born: Kenneth John Butler; April 23, 1937; Pittsburgh, Pennsylvania, U.S.
- Died: December 30, 2024 (aged 87)
- Education: BFA, MFA, MA
- Alma mater: Carnegie Mellon University, University of Illinois, University of Western Ontario
- Known for: Visual Artist
- Spouse: Sheila Butler
- Website: http://fatemaps.ca

Jack Butler (April 23, 1937 – 30 December 2024) was an American-Canadian visual artist. His work is in public and private collections including the National Gallery of Canada. He was a founding member of Sanavik Inuit Cooperative, Baker Lake, Nunavut. He was a medical model builder and published researcher in human development. He taught at Carnegie Mellon University, at the Banff Centre, the University of Manitoba, and in the Department of Philosophy at the University of Western Ontario. Butler died on December 30, 2024, at the age of 87.

== Early life, education and career ==
Jack Butler was born in Pittsburgh, Pennsylvania in 1937. As a teenager, Butler worked as an illustrator for pathologist Dr Louis Goodman at Southside Hospital in Pittsburgh, recording congenital anomalies which the pathologist found during the course of his work. Butler studied at Carnegie Institute of Technology and received his undergraduate degree, a BFA (painting and printmaking) in 1960. In 1962, Butler completed a Masters of Fine Arts at the University of Illinois Urbana-Champaign.

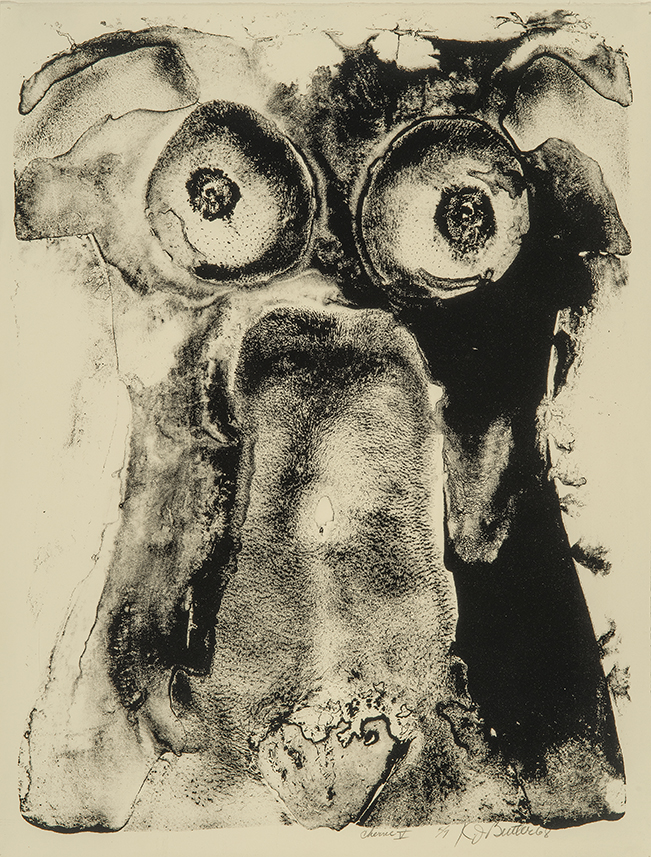
Lithograph print made from the body.

In 1969, Butler had his first major public exhibition. The exhibition, held at Lee Nordness Gallery in New York, included a print that would be included in H.W. Janson's History of Art editions from 1969 to 1985. The print depicted a flattened female torso and was "indexical as opposed to formal"; Butler wrote that this "allied my work with the development of the conceptual-art movement".

== Baker Lake ==
In 1969, Butler and his wife Sheila Butler arrived in Baker Lake, Northwest Territories. Butler was the Arts and Crafts officer for the Northwest Territories and together with Sheila Butler they engaged and supported Inuit artists. The Butlers initiated a printmaking project, sewing projects and a shop. Butler worked to help preserve Inuit myths and legends by encouraging Inuit artists, such as Victoria Mamnguqsualuk, to create drawings and prints that incorporated those narratives.

When the Butlers first arrived, they faced staunch skepticism about their programs. The local clothing factory had recently closed and many of the established printmakers had left. The community had already seen a series of unsuccessful government programs and arts and crafts officers. In Richard Crandall's book, Inuit Art: A History, he noted that the Inuit community, prior to the Butler's arrival, "had spent thousands of hours on printmaking projects only to see them fail". Nonetheless, the Butler's printmaking project began in the craft centre and offered a wage of $1.25 to $2.00 per hour for those willing to study printmaking. In addition to hourly wages, artists were paid for final editions of prints. By 1970, the Canadian Eskimo Arts Council approved the sale of a collection of 31 prints and requested a special exhibition for the spring and the program expanded adding two more positions. Eventually, the Butlers, along with the printshop manager Ruby Arngna’naaq, and members of the community founded the Sanavik Co-operative (Inuit for Open Studio)) whose mission was to "foster and coordinate the art activities in the settlement, and to be able to contract for other community services."

== Modelling human development ==
Between 1976 and 1981, Butler was commissioned by the Children's Hospital of Winnipeg Research Foundation to construct models representing the developmental changes that take place during normal genital morphogenesis. Butler acted as a member of a research team that included urological surgeon Alan Decter, pediatric endocrinologist Jeremy Winter, as well as a radiologist, and a geneticist. The lack of good structural information led Butler to perform microscopic observations of the developing genitals of aborted fetuses and embryos.

Butler then worked with pediatric respirologist Dr Hans Pasterkamp on models describing the structure of the terminal acinus of the embryological lung. As final visualizations, in 1981, Butler constructed five physical models in acrylic that describe the development of the tips of the branches of the lung, through embryonic and fetal stages of growth up to birth.

Butler also contributed to research on cardiac embryogenesis, creating seven three-dimensional fiberglass models depicting stages eleven to eighteen of cardiac embryogenesis, and one model of a mature heart, that were used in pedagogical experiments with medical students, cardiac technologists and nurses.

== Inter/trans-disciplinary practice ==
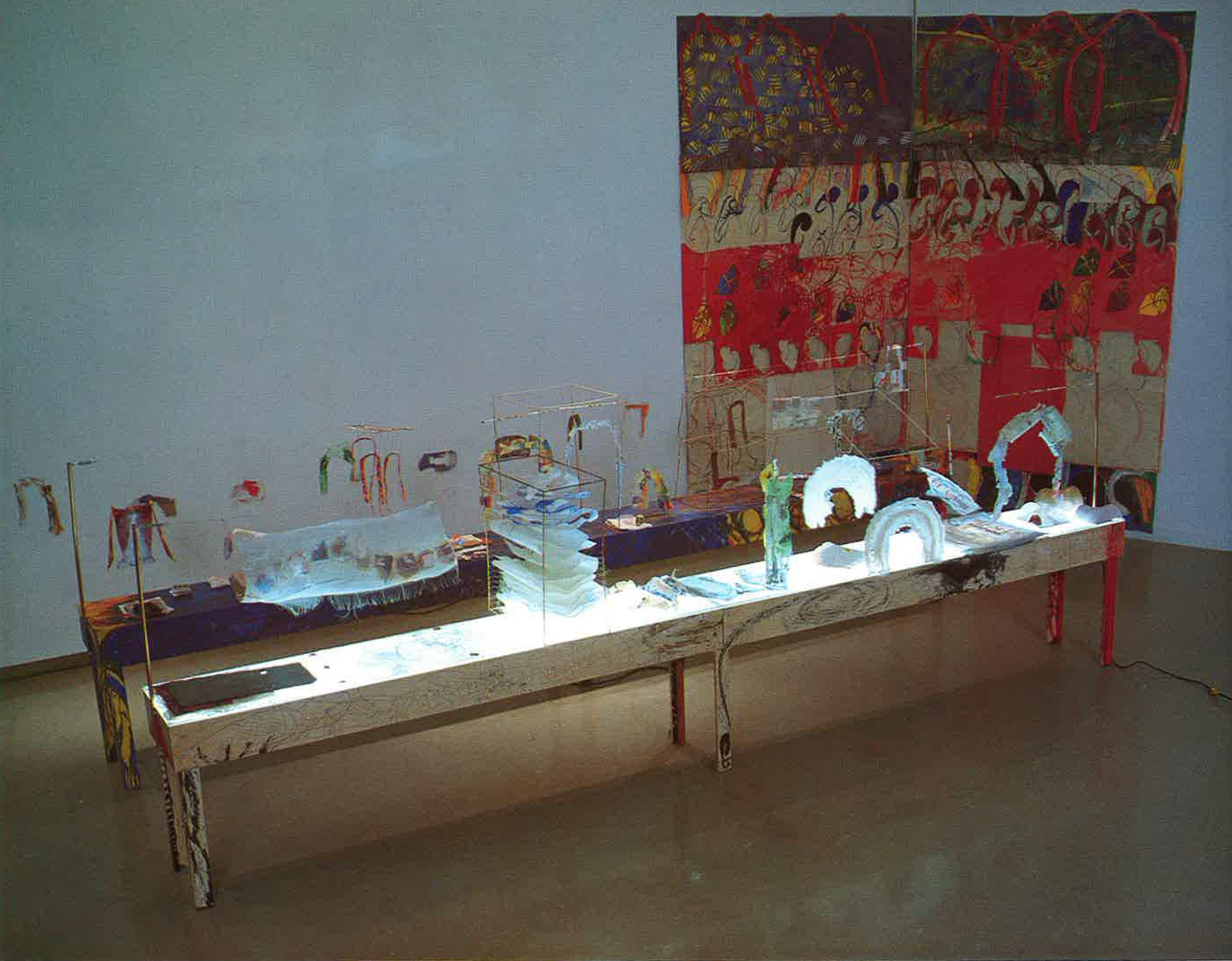
Art Science Tables by Jack Butler

One of the first appearances of medical-science-informed content in Butler's art is found in his 1983 work The Art/Science Tables about which critic Robert Enright wrote.

By the early 1990s, Butler was in a performance-work conceived of and written by Doug Melnyk called Gorilla which Butler describes as "a metaphor for 'the other,' the feminine, the spaces 'between' in the social contract". He created large woodcut prints (Male Embryogenesis, 1990) that Butler wrote "construct a meta narrative for the crisis of my sex."; and lecture-performances in which Butler presented a theory of genital morphogenesis by drawing on his own torso and on the skin of his collaborator Dennis Wilkie.

=== Art and Cold Cash ===
Between 2004 and 2007, Butler worked on the project Art and Cold Cash. The collective of artists who worked on the project included southern-Canadian visual artists Sheila Butler and Patrick Mahon, as well as northern-Canadian writer Ruby Arngna'naaq and artist William Noah.Art and Cold Cash was showcased in art galleries across Canada, arctic settlements, the University of Edinburgh, and the Toronto Pearson International Airport.
