= Sheila Butler =

American-Canadian visual artist and retired professor (born 1938)

- Born: 1938 (age 87–88); Leesport, Pennsylvania, U.S.
- Education: BFA
- Alma mater: Carnegie Mellon University
- Known for: Visual artist
- Spouse: KJ (Jack) Butler
- Elected: Fellow of the Royal Canadian Academy of Arts

Sheila Butler RCA (born 1938) is an American-Canadian visual artist and retired professor, now based in Winnipeg, Manitoba. She is a founding member of Mentoring Artists for Women's Art in Winnipeg, Manitoba and the Sanavik Inuit Cooperative in Baker Lake, Nunavut. She is a fellow of the Royal Canadian Academy of Arts.

== Career and education ==
Butler was born in Leesport, Pennsylvania. She obtained a Bachelor of Fine Arts degree with honors from Carnegie Mellon University (formerly the Carnegie Institute of Technology) in Pittsburgh in 1960. She moved to Canada in 1962 and became a Canadian citizen in 1975.

=== Baker Lake ===
In the late 1960s and early 1970s, she along with her husband Jack Butler, served as a special projects officer for the Northwest Territories, where they engaged and supported Inuit artists. They initiated a printmaking project, sewing projects and a shop. When the Butlers first arrived, they faced staunch skepticism about their programs. The local clothing factory had recently closed and many of the established printmakers had left. The community had already seen a series of unsuccessful government programs and arts and crafts officers. In Richard Crandall's book, Inuit Art: A History, he noted that the Inuit community, prior to the Butler's arrival, "had spent thousands of hours on printmaking projects only to see them fail". Nonetheless, the Butler's printmaking project began in the craft centre and offered a wage of $1.25 to $2.00 per hour for those willing to study printmaking. By 1970, the Canadian Eskimo Arts Council approved the sale of a collection of 31 prints and requested a special exhibition for the spring and the program expanded adding two more positions. Eventually, the Butlers founded the Sanavik Co-operative who mission was to "foster and coordinate the art activities in the settlement, and to be able to contract for other community services."

=== Academic career and artistry ===
In late 1972, Sheila Butler left the Northwest Territories and assumed teaching positions the University of Manitoba and the University of Winnipeg between 1973 and 1989, before moving to the Visual Arts faculty at the University of Western Ontario. She retired from teaching in 2004 and moved to Toronto, Ontario.

As a visual artist, her work centres around the human condition. Some of her series have included bodies swimming, in tents, sleeping, while other works focus on violent images from the news media. In particular, her work delves into the treatment of women. Examples of such work are Bedroom (1982) and The National and the Journal (1984). Gary Michael Dault from The Globe and Mail said, "drawing has always been a central fact of her [Butler] existence as an artist (her wispy, sprawling drawing installation, The Essential Tremor, a sort of enterable dream journal, is one of the strongest works in the show)." Further, Dault described Butler as a "veteran artist" and "a brilliant (and inexplicably undervalued) painter". Butler explored themes of violence and fear in her collection The National and the Journal along with other artists including Eleanor Bond, Wanda Koop, Eva Stubbs and Diana Thorneycroft.

Between 2004 and 2007, Sheila Butler, along with northern-Canadian writer Ruby Arngna'naaq, artist William Noah, southern-Canadian visual artist Patrick Mahon, and Jack Butler, formed the Art and Cold Cash Collective, a five-person artists' collective. The exhibition called Art and Cold Cash toured to Canadian art galleries and Arctic settlements, as well as the University of Edinburgh and the Toronto Pearson International Airport.

In 1983, Plug-In-Art (now Plug-In ICA) created an exploratory committee of women to find ways in which to integrate and promote female artists in Winnipeg. Mentoring Artists for Women's Art was founded based upon the recommendations of the committee, with Butler as a founding member.

A retrospective exhibition co-curated by Pamela Edmonds and Patrick Mahon, entitled Sheila Butler: Other Circumstances, was held in Winnipeg in 2024, and in London, Ontario in 2021.

Her work is in such public collections as the National Gallery of Canada, the Art Gallery of Hamilton, the University of Toronto, the Winnipeg Art Gallery and University of Manitoba in Winnipeg, as well as the Robert McLaughlin Gallery, Oshawa.

== Books and published work ==
- Butler, Sheila; Winnipeg Art Gallery. Sheila Butler, Recent Paintings: the Winnipeg Art Gallery March 15 to April 26, 1981. Winnipeg, MB: Winnipeg Art Gallery, 1981. Print. ISBN 0889150915.
- Engelstad, Bernadette; Butler, Sheila; Driscoll, Bernadette; Winnipeg Art Gallery. Baker Lake prints & print-drawings, 1970–76: Feb. 27–April 17, 1983, the Winnipeg Art Gallery. Winnipeg, MB: Winnipeg Art Gallery, 1982. Print. ISBN 0889151113
- Moppett, George; Butler, Sheila. Sheila Butler, paintings 1986. Saskatoon, SK: Mendel Art Gallery, 1986. Print. ISBN 0919863272
- Butler, Sheila; Whitehouse, Diane. Diane Whitehouse, paintings, rooms and other walled places. Winnipeg, MB: University of Manitoba, 1986. Print. OCLC 16182945.
- Butler, Sheila; Wight, Darlene. The first passionate collector: the Ian Lindsay collection of Inuit art. Winnipeg, MB: Winnipeg Art Gallery, 1991. Print. ISBN 0889151598
- Burke, Rebecca; Butler, Sheila. In Search of Medusa. Sackville, NB: The Owens Art Gallery, 1996. Print. ISBN 088828134X
- Butler, Sheila; Fischer, Barbara; Patten, James. Sheila Butler: Matters of Life and Death. London, ON: London Regional Art and Historical Museums, 1997. Print. ISBN 1895800455
- Feheley Fine Arts. The Butler Collection: early Baker Lake drawings. Toronto, ON: Feheley Fine Arts, 1999. Print. ISBN 0968486703
- Butler, Sheila; Reid, Stuart; Parkins, Ilya. Sheila Butler: Sympathetic Magic. Mississauga, ON: Mississauga Art Gallery, 2000. Print. ISBN 1895436400
- Butler, Sheila. Nursery Rhymes. Winnipeg, MB: University of Winnipeg, 2000. Print. OCLC 62768979.
