= Sidney Wolinsky =

Canadian-American film editor

Sidney Wolinsky is a Canadian-American (b. Winnipeg, Manitoba, Canada) film editor with over 30 credits beginning in 1983. He won the Primetime Emmy Award for Outstanding Single-Camera Picture Editing for a Drama Series for the pilot episode of Boardwalk Empire (2010). Earlier, his work on The Sopranos (1999–2007) earned him three Emmy nominations and two ACE Eddie Awards.

The son of sculptor Eva Stubbs and Hyman Wolinsky, he was born in Winnipeg, attended high school in Montreal and went to Brandeis University in Massachusetts. He received a master's degree in film from the Cinema Department at San Francisco State University and worked briefly for the Canadian Broadcasting Corporation in Toronto. He subsequently moved to Los Angeles. His parents are Jewish, and he had a Bar Mitzvah.

For the Guillermo del Toro drama The Shape of Water (2017), Wolinsky was nominated for the Academy Award for Best Film Editing, the BAFTA Award for Best Editing, the Critics' Choice Movie Award for Best Editing and several other accolades.

== Filmography ==
- 1983 My Tutor
- 1984 Best Defense
- 1985 One Magic Christmas
- 1986 Miami Vice (TV series)
- 1986 Howard the Duck
- 1987 Maid to Order
- 1989 Worth Winning
- 1990 Poochinski (TV short)
- 1990 The China Lake Murders
- 1991 Red Wind (TV movie)
- 1991 Perfect Harmony
- 1992 Mrs. 'Arris Goes to Paris
- 1992 The Danger of Love: The Carolyn Warmus Story (TV movie)
- 1992 Baby Snatcher (TV movie)
- 1992 In the Shadow of a Killer (TV movie)
- 1992 Something to Live for: The Alison Gertz Story
- 1993 Love, Honor & Obey: The Last Mafia Marriage (TV movie)
- 1993 The Disappearance of Nora
- 1994 The Yarn Princess (TV movie)
- 1994 I Spy Returns
- 1994 Circle of Fate (short)
- 1995 Trial by Fire (TV movie)
- 1995 Far from Home: The Adventures of Yellow Dog
- 1996 For My Daughter's Honor
- 1997 Chariots of the Gods
- 1998 Circle of Deceit (TV movie)
- 1998 Prey (TV series)
- 1999 The Yellow Badge of Courage (short)
- 1999–2007 The Sopranos - 32 episodes
- 2005 Rome TV series
- 2008 Sons of Anarchy – Pilot
- 2008 Swingtown
- 2008 Secrets of a Hollywood Nurse (TV movie)
- 2009 Natalee Holloway
- 2010 The Walking Dead (TV series)
- 2010 Blue Bloods – Pilot (TV series)
- 2010 Boardwalk Empire – Pilot (TV series)
- 2010 Three Rivers (TV series)
- 2011 Camelot
- 2011 Homecoming
- 2012 Not Fade Away
- 2013 House of Cards
- 2017 The Shape of Water
- 2020 Greyhound
