= Simeon Mikkungwak =

Canadian politician

Simeon Mikkungwak MLA

Member of the Legislative Assembly of Nunavut for Baker Lake
- In office October 28, 2013 – February 25, 2020
- Preceded by: Moses Aupaluktuq
- Succeeded by: Craig Simailak

10th Speaker of the Legislative Assembly of Nunavut
- In office May 28, 2019 – February 25, 2020
- Preceded by: Joe Enook
- Succeeded by: Paul Quassa

Personal details
- Born: 1968 or 1969 (age 56–57)
- Party: non-partisan consensus government

Simeon Mikkungwak is a Canadian politician, who was elected to the Legislative Assembly of Nunavut in the 2013 election to represent the electoral district of Baker Lake. He was elected as Speaker of the Legislative Assembly of Nunavut on May 28, 2019.

He resigned from the legislature in February 2020 for family reasons.
