= Centre of Canada =

Geographical centre

There are several ways of determining the centre of Canada giving different locations.

== Longitude ==
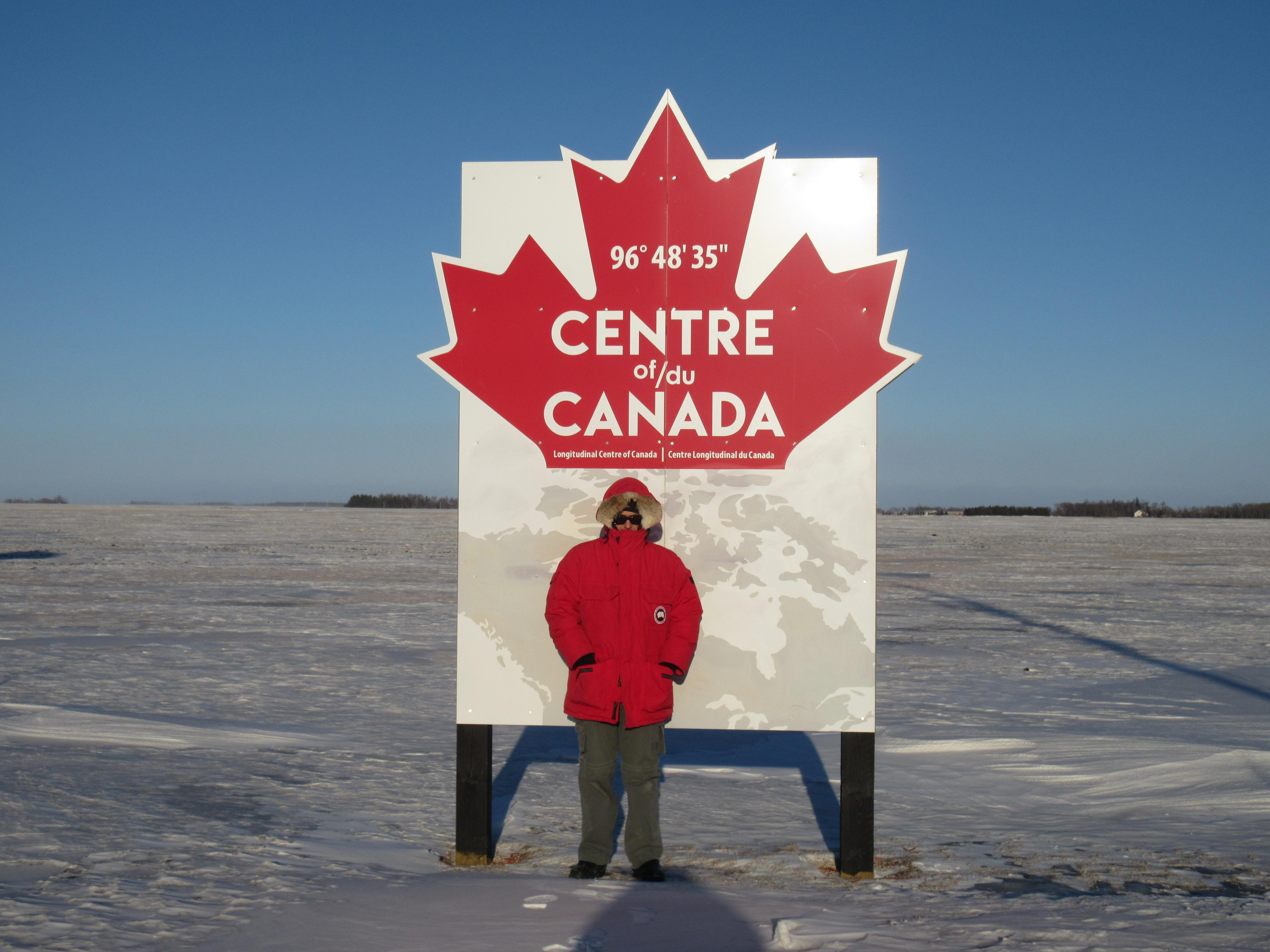
Sign on the Trans-Canada Highway near Winnipeg, marking the longitude centre of Canada

The Rural Municipality of Taché, Manitoba, east of Winnipeg on the Trans-Canada Highway, has a sign at 96°48'35"W that proclaims it the longitudinal centre of Canada. The sign was upgraded with the opening of Centre of Canada Park in 2017. In effect, it marks the north-south line midway between the extreme points of Canada on the east and west, including islands (including Newfoundland since 1949).

== Latitude ==
The latitudinal centre of Canada (including islands, but excluding Canada's claim to the North Pole) is a line at 62 degrees 24 minutes North.

== Intersection of latitude and longitude ==
The intersection of these two lines is one definition of the centre point of Canada, as explained by the Atlas of Canada's website:

The centre of Canada can be measured in many ways. The most readily understood would be by taking the mid-point of the extremities of the Canadian landmass section, above. The resulting location 62°24′N 096°28′W is located just south of Yathkyed Lake in Nunavut, west of Hudson Bay.

— The Atlas of Canada website, Natural Resources Canada

The nearest inhabited places to this point are Baker Lake, Nunavut well to the north, and Arviat to the east. A sign that proclaims the point as the geographic centre of Canada was added in 1959.

== Pole of inaccessibility ==
The pole of inaccessibility of Canada (the point furthest from any coastline or land border) is near Jackfish River, Alberta at 34-115-17-W4 (Latitude: 59°1′ 48" N, Longitude: 112°49′ 12" W).
