= Eva Koves Stubbs =

Canadian artist (1925-2017)

- Born: Eva Koves; 20 April 1925; Budapest, Hungary
- Died: 16 December 2017 (aged 92)
- Education: fine arts diploma from the University of Manitoba in 1957
- Known for: artist and educator
- Spouse(s): Hyman Wolinsky; Harold St. George Stubbs

Eva Koves Stubbs RCA (20 April 1925 – 16 December 2017) was a Hungarian-born Canadian artist and educator.

== Career ==
Stubbs was born Eva Koves in Budapest, the daughter of Jewish parents, grew up in Barcelona and Tangier, and came to Winnipeg with her parents in 1942. She married Hyman Wolinsky soon afterwards; the couple had a son, film editor Sidney Wolinsky in 1947. She and her husband Hyman Wolinsky were of Jewish background. Later that same year, she was diagnosed with tuberculosis and moved into a sanitarium in Saint Boniface. Stubbs received a fine arts diploma from the University of Manitoba in 1957. She also attended summer classes at the Cranbrook Academy of Art in Michigan, the University of Minnesota and the Banff School of the Arts.

She separated from her husband and moved with her son to Montreal, where she taught high school art classes from 1959 to 1963. Stubbs subsequently returned to Winnipeg, where she married lawyer Harold St. George Stubbs and had another son. She later taught art classes at the Winnipeg Art Gallery and Lakehead University. She was a founding member of SITE, an artist-run co-operative gallery in Winnipeg and was a mentor in the advisory program for the organization Mentoring Artists for Women's Art. She was elected to the Royal Canadian Academy of Arts in 1995.

Stubbs held her first solo exhibition in 1976. She worked in wood, bronze and clay, producing realistic and abstract human figures. She completed a series of bronze panels for the Manitoba Law Courts building. The Winnipeg Art Gallery held a retrospective of her work in 2010. Stubbs also created a number of bronze busts for the Winnipeg Citizen's Hall of Fame in Assiniboine Park.

She died in Winnipeg in 2017.
