= Baker Lake (electoral district) =

Territorial electoral district in Nunavut, Canada

Coordinates: 64°19′05″N 096°01′03″W

Nunavut electoral district
- Boundaries of Baker Lake

Territorial electoral district
- Legislature: Legislative Assembly of Nunavut
MLA
Craig Simailak
- District created: 15 February 1999
- First contested: 1999
- Last contested: 2025

Demographics
- Census division: Baker Lake

Baker Lake (Inuktitut: ᖃᒪᓂᑦᑐᐊᕐᒃ, Inuinnaqtun: Qamanittuaq) is a territorial electoral district (riding) for the Legislative Assembly of Nunavut, Canada. The riding consists of the community of Baker Lake. The current Member of the Legislative Assembly is Simeon Mikkungwak.

The Nunavut Electoral Boundaries Commission has recommended the district be renamed Qamani'tuaq, after the Inuktitut name of the community, for the next election, along with minor boundary changes. However, the name appears to have not been changed.

== Members of the Legislative Assembly ==
† by-election

Parliament	Years	Member
1st	1999–2004	Glenn McLean
2nd	2004–2008	David Simailak
3rd	2008–2013	Moses Aupaluktuq
4th	2013–2017	Simeon Mikkungwak
5th	2017–2020	Simeon Mikkungwak
5th†	2020–2021	Craig Atangalaaq Simailak
6th	2021–2025	Craig Atangalaaq Simailak
7th	2025–present	Craig Atangalaaq Simailak

== Election results ==
=== 2025 election ===
2025 Nunavut general election
Candidate	Votes	%
Craig Atangalaaq Simailak	268	52.5
Simeon Mikkungwak	242	47.5
Eligible voters		1,061
Total valid ballots		510
Rejected ballots		2
Turnout		48.44%

=== 2021 election ===
2021 Nunavut general election
Candidate	Votes	%
Craig Atangalaaq Simailak	327	73.3
Elijah Amarook	71	15.9
Daniel Piryuaq	48	10.8
Eligible voters		1,027
Total valid ballots		446
Rejected ballots		8
Turnout		43.4%

=== 2020 by-election ===
2020 Nunavut general election: Baker Lake
Candidate	Votes
Craig Atangalaaq Simailak	Acclaimed

=== 2017 election ===
2017 Nunavut general election
Candidate	Votes	%
Simeon Mikkungwak	389	58.15
Karen Kabloona	280	41.85
Eligible voters		969
Total valid ballots		669
Rejected ballots		7
Turnout		69.05%

=== 2013 election ===
2013 Nunavut general election
Candidate	Votes	%
Simeon Mikkungwak	392	59.3
Karen Yip	269	40.7
Eligible voters		935
Total valid ballots		661
Rejected ballots		1
Turnout		70.7%

=== 2008 election ===
2008 Nunavut general election
Candidate	Votes	%
Moses Aupaluktuq	266	41.2
David Simailak	236	36.5
Elijah Amarook	144	22.3
Eligible voters		961
Total valid ballots		646
Rejected ballots		3
Turnout		67.25%

=== 2004 election ===
2004 Nunavut general election
Candidate	Votes	%
David Simailak	352	48.22
David Aksawnee	209	28.63
Becky Kudloo	96	13.15
David Toolooktook	73	10.00
Eligible voters		819
Total valid ballots		730
Rejected ballots		3
Turnout		89.50%

=== 1999 election ===
1999 Nunavut general election
Candidate	Votes	%
Glenn McLean	460	63.98
Patrick Tagoona	187	26.01
David Toolooktook	72	10.01
Eligible voters		845
Total valid ballots		719
Rejected ballots		0

== See also ==
- List of Nunavut territorial electoral districts
- Canadian provincial electoral districts
