= Baker Lake (California) =

Lake in the state of California, United States

- Location within California Location within the United States
- Location: Shasta County, California
- Coordinates: 40°38′53″N 121°22′33″W
- Type: Lake
- Basin countries: United States
- Surface elevation: 5,341 feet (1,628 m)

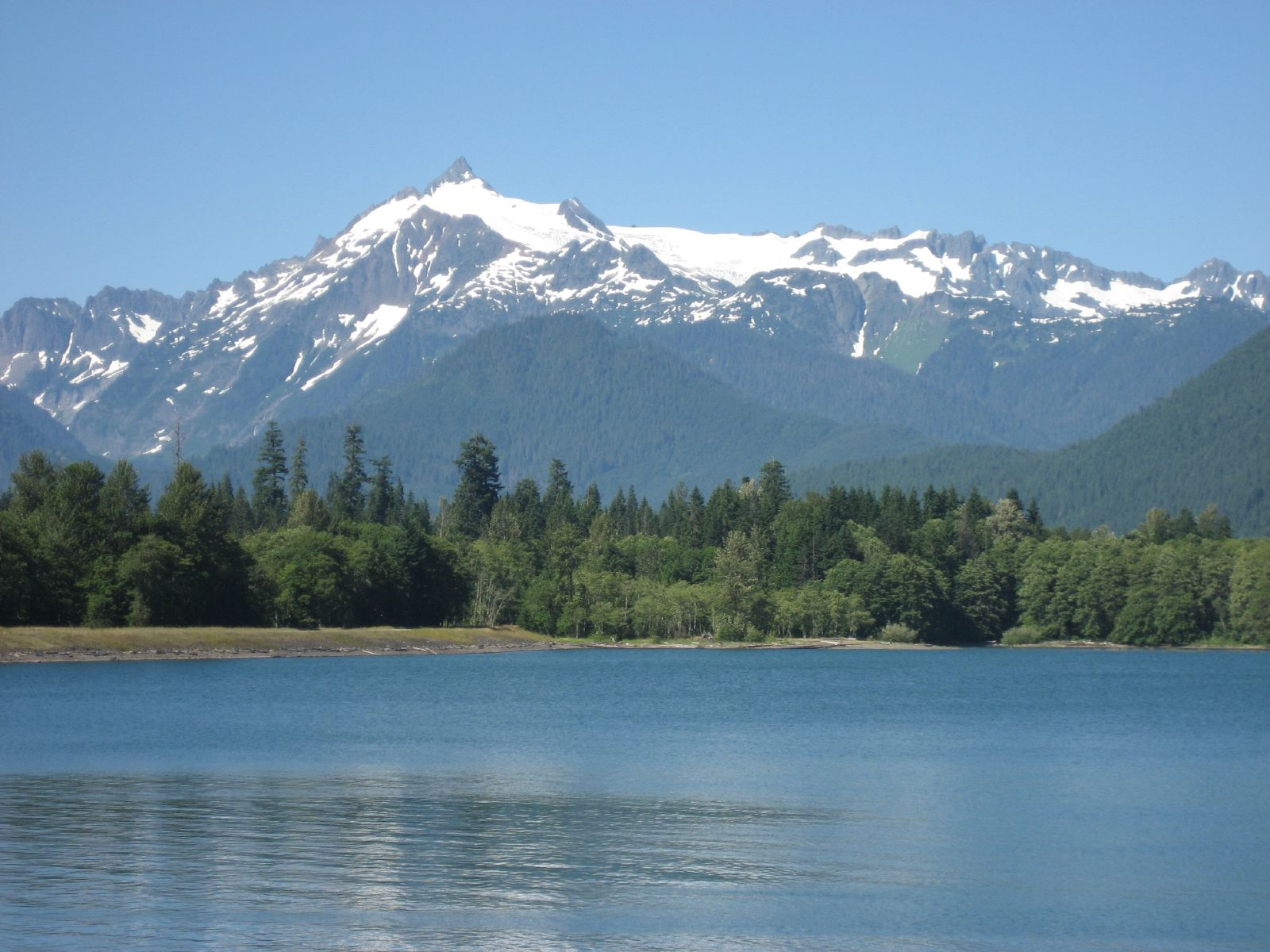
A view of Mt. Shuksan over Baker Lake in Whatcom County, WA.

Baker Lake is a lake located in Shasta County, California, United States. The lake's surface elevation is 5,315 feet (1,620 m).
