= Baker Lake Airport =

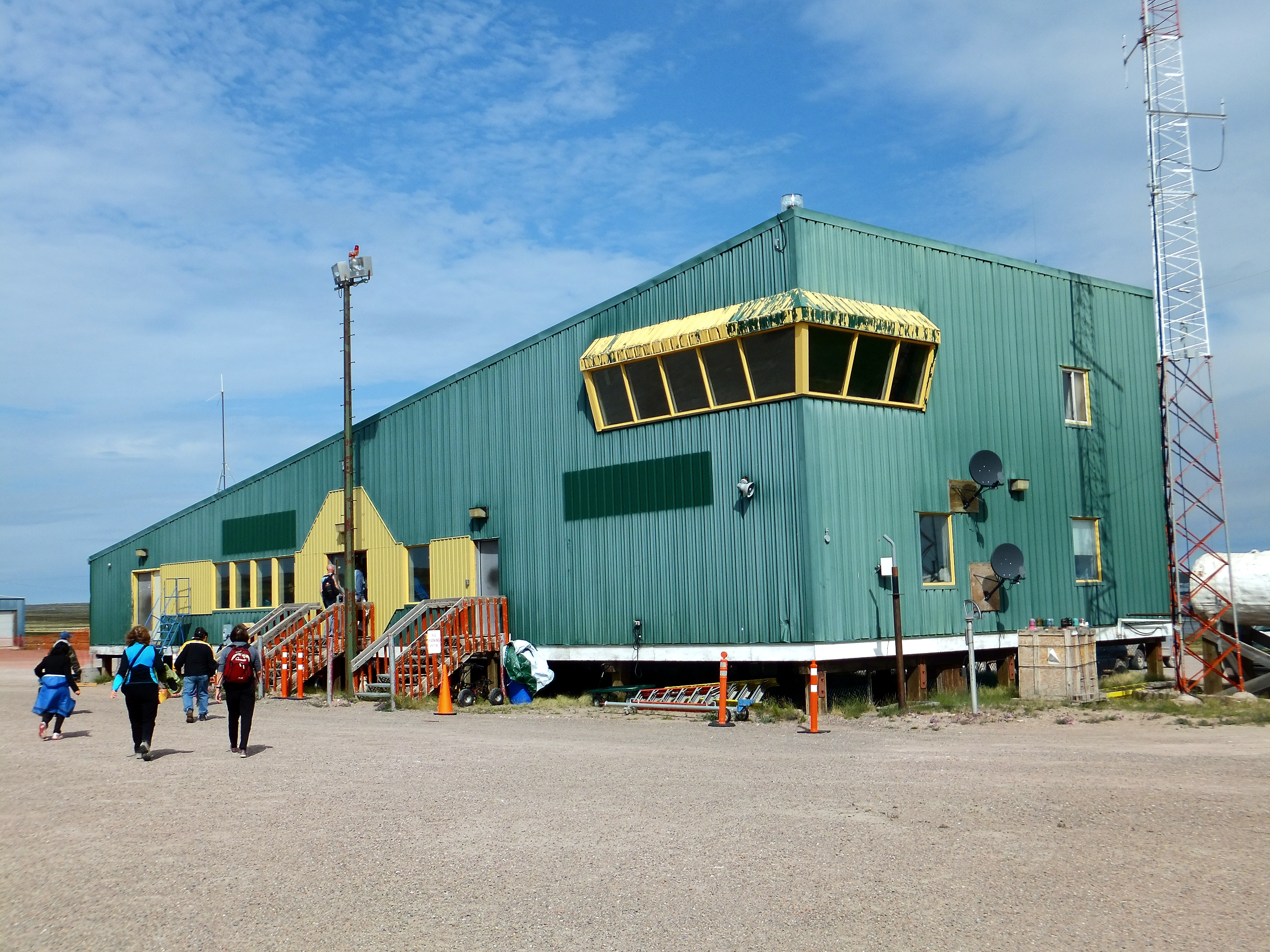
- IATA: YBK; ICAO: CYBK; WMO: 71926

Summary
- Airport type: Public
- Operator: Government of Nunavut
- Location: Baker Lake, Nunavut
- Time zone: CST (UTC−06:00)
  - Summer (DST): CDT (UTC−05:00)
- Elevation AMSL: 61 ft / 19 m
- Coordinates: 64°17′56″N 096°04′40″W

Map
- Location in Nunavut

Runways
Direction	Length		Surface
Direction	ft	m	Surface
16/34	4,195	1,279	Gravel

Statistics (2010)
- Aircraft movements: 6,457
- Source: Canada Flight Supplement; Movements from Statistics Canada; Environment Canada

Baker Lake Airport (IATA: YBK, ICAO: CYBK) is located 3 nautical miles (5.6 km; 3.5 mi) southwest of Baker Lake, Nunavut, Canada. It is operated by the Government of Nunavut. It has a single gravel runway 4,195 ft × 100 ft (1,279 m × 30 m).

== Airlines and destinations ==
Airlines	Destinations
Calm Air	Rankin Inlet

Ookpik Aviation operates charter flights.

== See also ==
- Baker Lake Water Aerodrome
