= David Simailak =

Canadian politician

MLA for Baker Lake
- In office 2004–2008
- Preceded by: Glenn McLean
- Succeeded by: Moses Aupaluktuq

Personal details
- Born: c. 1952 Baker Lake, Nunavut
- Party: non-partisan consensus government

David Simailak (born c. 1952) is a Canadian politician. He was the Member of the Legislative Assembly (MLA) for the electoral district of Baker Lake having won the seat in the 2004 Nunavut election. Simailak was the Minister of Finance and the Minister Responsible for the Liquor Licensing Board.

Prior to becoming an MLA in the Legislative Assembly of Nunavut Simailak was the mayor of Baker Lake and vice-chair of the Nunavut Power Corporation.

On 11 September 2008, a report by acting integrity commissioner Norman Pickell was tabled in the Legislative Assembly. The report stated that Simailak had violated the Integrity Act while acting as Minister of Finance from 2005 to 2007.

His son Craig Simailak was elected to the legislative assembly to represent Baker Lake in 2020.

== Rape conviction ==
Simailak was found guilty of rape in April 2022 in connection to an incident that occurred in 1973.
