= Super Shamou =

- Cover of Super Shamou #1, 2nd printing (1989 Inuit Broadcasting Corporation), art by Nick Burns.

Publication information
- Publisher: Inuit Broadcasting Corporation
- Schedule: Special issue
- Format: One-shot
- Genre: Superhero
- Publication date: 1989
- No. of issues: 1

Creative team
- Created by: Barney Pattunguyak, Peter Tapatai
- Written by: Nick Burns
- Penciller: Nick Burns
- Inker: Nick Burns
- Letterer: Nick Burns
- Colorist: Chris Chuckry

Super Shamou is an Inuk superhero that appeared in short films produced by the Inuit Broadcasting Corporation as well as a comic book. Super Shamou was created by Barney Pattunguyak and Peter Tapatai and first appeared in an IBC broadcast in 1987. Super Shamou is the first comic printed in Inuktitut. The comic book was bilingual featuring both French and English editions, and both versions also included an Inuktitut translation. The comic was written and drawn by Nick Burns, with Micah Lightstone providing the Inuktitut translation.

== Creation ==
Pattunguyak and Tapatai were involved in producing and hosting television shows in the Kivalliq Region when the Inuit Broadcasting Corporation formed in 1981. According to an interview with Tapatai upon being named to the Order of Nunavut in 2020, Super Shamou originated as an experiment using a three-quarter-inch recorder to shoot Tapatai lying on a table wearing a baseball cap and a white sheet. A thread was attached to the cap and yanked to create a flying effect. 150 episodes of Super Shamou were shot in total, with 3 episodes making it on air.

== Characterization ==
Super Shamou's secret identity is Peter, a mild-mannered Inuk man. Peter is awoken one night by a spirit who provides him with a necklace that grants super powers and informs him that he has been chosen to protect the Arctic.

=== Likeness ===
Super Shamou's comic book design was inspired by Peter Tapatai who also depicted the character on television.

== Abilities ==
Super Shamou has super hearing and is always alert to Inuit in distress. Super Shamou can fly, has superhuman strength, and is resistant to cold. He uses his powers to watch over the Arctic, keep Inuit safe, and encourage healthy habits.

== Cultural impact ==
As a character created by two Inuk artists, Super Shamou is seen as a credible Inuit representation which contributed to the character's popularity among Inuit. The character served as an educational tool directed towards Inuit children to expose them to Inuit traditions and the Inuktitut language.

Extracts of Super Shamou television footage were shown at the Royal Anthropological Institute of Great Britain and Ireland Third International Festival of Ethnographic Film where it was displayed as an example of Inuit television and noted for using the convention of comic book heros to express Inuit identity. Super Shamou has also been featured in the Nunavut Tunngavik Incorporated’s Inuktitut film festival as part of Nunavut Day celebrations.

Super Shamou has been compared to other Inuit cultural productions and contrasted with government produced comic book characters such as Captain Al Cohol.

Peter Tapatai was awarded an Order of Nunavut in part as recognition for creating the character.
