= Skylight (disambiguation) =

A skylight is a structure or window in the roof of a building that lets in light or air.

Skylight may also refer to:

== Arts, entertainment and media ==
=== Music ===
- Skylight (band), a South African pop rock band
- Skylight (Art Lande album), 1981
- Skylight (Pinegrove album), 2018
- "Skylight" (Nelly Furtado song)
- Skylight, a 2015 Global Science Opera production
- Skylight Music Theatre, an American light opera and musical theatre company

=== Other arts and entertainment ===
- Skylight (novel), a 2011 novel by José Saramago
- Skylight (play), by David Hare
- Skylight Pictures, a film company
- Skylight, a short film by David Clayton Rogers

== Places in the United States ==
- Skylight, Arkansas, an unincorporated community
- Skylight, Kentucky, an unincorporated community
- Mount Skylight, in the Adirondack Mountains of New York
- Skylight Cave, a lava tube in Oregon

== Buildings ==
- Ethiopian Skylight Hotel, a five-star hotel in Addis Ababa, Ethiopia
- Skylight, a skyscraper in Warsaw, Poland, part of Złote Tarasy complex
- Skylight Office Tower, Cleveland, Ohio, United States

== Other uses ==
- Skylight of a lava tube, a hole in the ceiling of the tube
- Skylight 1A, a photographic filter factor that absorbs ultraviolet radiation
- Lenovo Skylight, a cancelled project for a small portable computer with mobile telephone
