= Art Gallery of Guelph =

Coordinates: 43.5329°N 80.2329°W

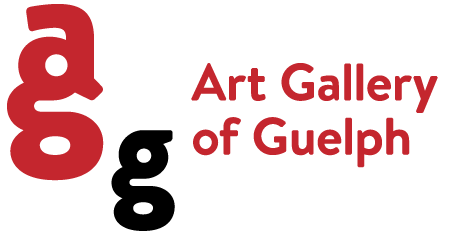
- Established: 1978
- Location: 358 Gordon Street (at College Avenue), Guelph, Ontario, Canada; N1G 1Y1
- Type: Public gallery
- Director: Shauna McCabe
- Website: ArtGalleryofGuelph.ca

The Art Gallery of Guelph (AGG), formerly the Macdonald Stewart Art Centre, is a public gallery and adjoining Sculpture garden in Guelph, Ontario. Its collection consists of over 9,000 works. The AGG is a nonprofit organization which focuses on research, publishing, educational programs, and touring exhibitions.

== History ==
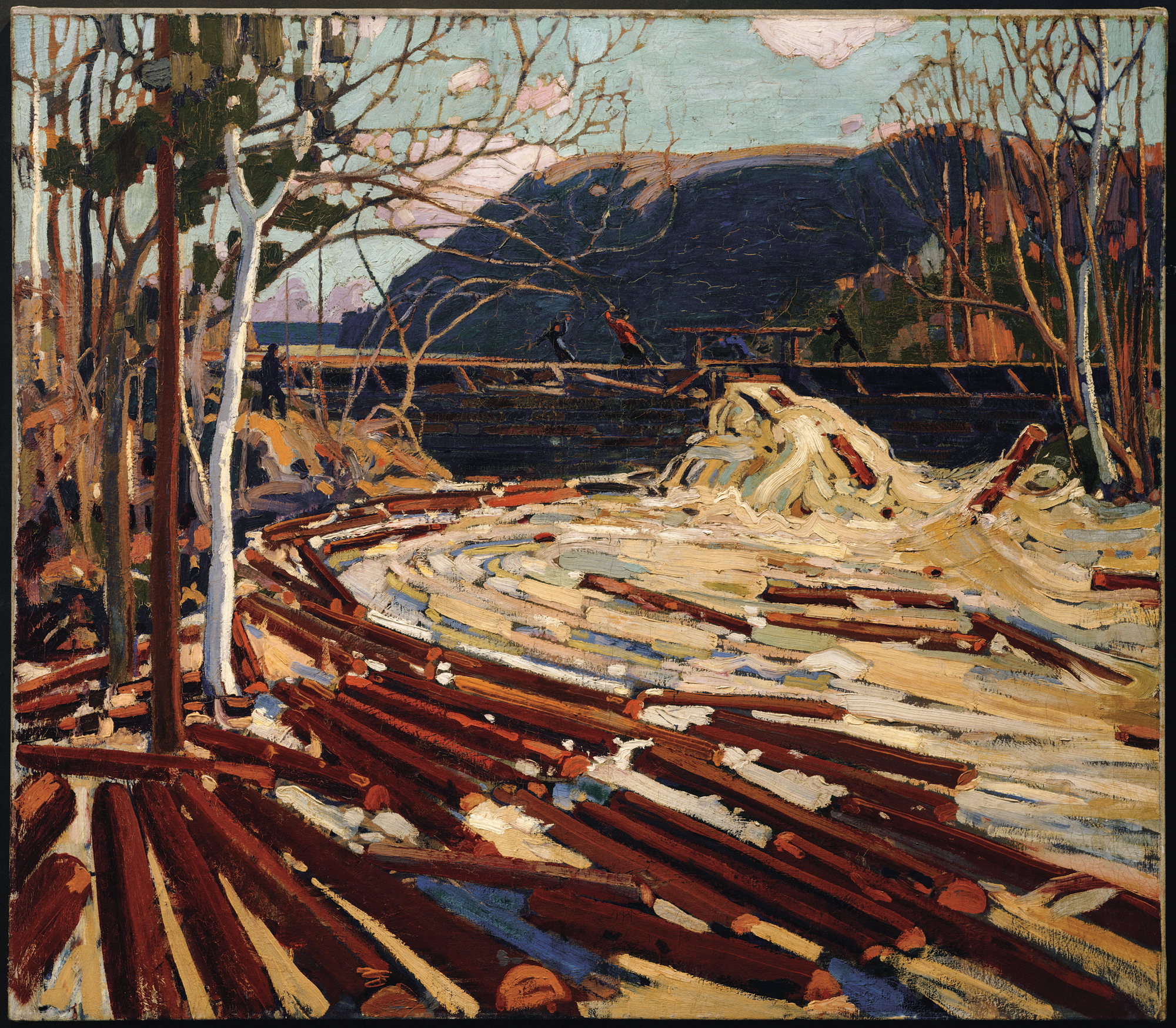
Tom Thomson, The Drive, c. 1916. This painting was purchased in 1926 by the Ontario Agricultural College with funds raised by students, faculty and staff. Today it is the art gallery's most famous piece.

Originally known as MacDonald Stewart Art Centre from 1978 to 2014, the AGG is a nonprofit organization with three sponsors: the University of Guelph, the City of Guelph, and the Upper Grand District School Board. It was founded in 1978. The art gallery was established as a new cultural institution to benefit the wider community. When the gallery formally opened to the public on November 7, 1980, the University of Guelph curator, Judith Nasby, was appointed director and curator.

Architect Raymond Moriyama renovated the historic 1904 school building to create a public art gallery meeting international standards. In 1983, the Donald Forster Sculpture Park was established on the 2.5-acre site adjacent to the building. It is the largest outdoor collection at an institution in Canada. It includes 40 works by artists from across the country. In 2016, the Art Gallery of Guelph appointed new leadership; Shauna McCabe became the gallery's director on August 1, 2016.

The AGG is housed in a 31,000-square-foot building with seven gallery spaces over two floors. There are three open-concept galleries on the main floor, including a central clerestory gallery. The second floor includes three uniquely-configured gallery spaces, as well as a lecture room, large-scale art storage, and an art studio.

The AGG conducts contemporary exhibition programming featuring international and national artists. Therefore, the exhibitions aim to highlight the emerging work of established regional artists. The Art Gallery of Guelph collection includes a large assortment of Canadian art, as well as an expansive Inuit art collection. In 1926, the Ontario Agricultural College (affiliated with the University of Guelph since 1964) purchased a painting by Tom Thomson called The Drive (c. 1916), marking the start of the collection. This painting is now one of the gallery's most celebrated works. The permanent collection features First Nations, Inuit, Canadian and international art.

In 2022, the AGG announced a call for submissions for the 2022 Middlebrook Prize for young Canadian curators. The objective of the competition was to inspire positive social change in economic, environmental, social and cultural challenges.

== Incorporation ==
On November 30, 1978, the Macdonald Stewart Art Centre was incorporated as a Non-Profit Organization and registered as a Charitable Organization.

The creation of the Macdonald Stewart Art Centre took place when the centre was established through a private member's bill introduced to the provincial legislature. Its four sponsors included: the Wellington County Board of Education, the city of Guelph, the County of Wellington and the University of Guelph. In 2012, the county exited the partnership and subsequently the Art Gallery of Guelph Act, through which the gallery's name change was achieved, received Royal assent on December 11, 2014.

== Architecture ==
Architect Raymond Moriyama was selected to transform the school into a gallery which would meet international standards. Moriyama's design added two wings. These additions contain mechanical spaces and stairs, providing an additional 6,000 square feet of space. The façade, with its Greek Revival porches, has been restored and its original roofline maintained.

A three-story skylighted gallery is suitable for showing large paintings, sculptures, oversized tapestries, and banners. Approximately 7,000 square feet has been allotted for art exhibitions and events. In addition to gallery spaces, the first and second levels house a gallery shop, a lecture hall, and a multi-purpose studio/meeting room. The lower level includes a facility for the proper care and storage of art as well as exhibition preparation. The third floor contains offices, a meeting room and a resource centre.

== Gallery Shop ==
The gallery shop offers jewelry, porcelain, pottery, blown glass, wood, and metalwork by regional artists. Paintings and works on paper are for sale and rent. The shop is a fundraiser run by the AGG Volunteer Association.
