= Baker Lake, Nunavut =

Baker Lake: ᖃᒪᓂᑦᑐᐊᖅ; Qamani'tuaq
- Hamlet
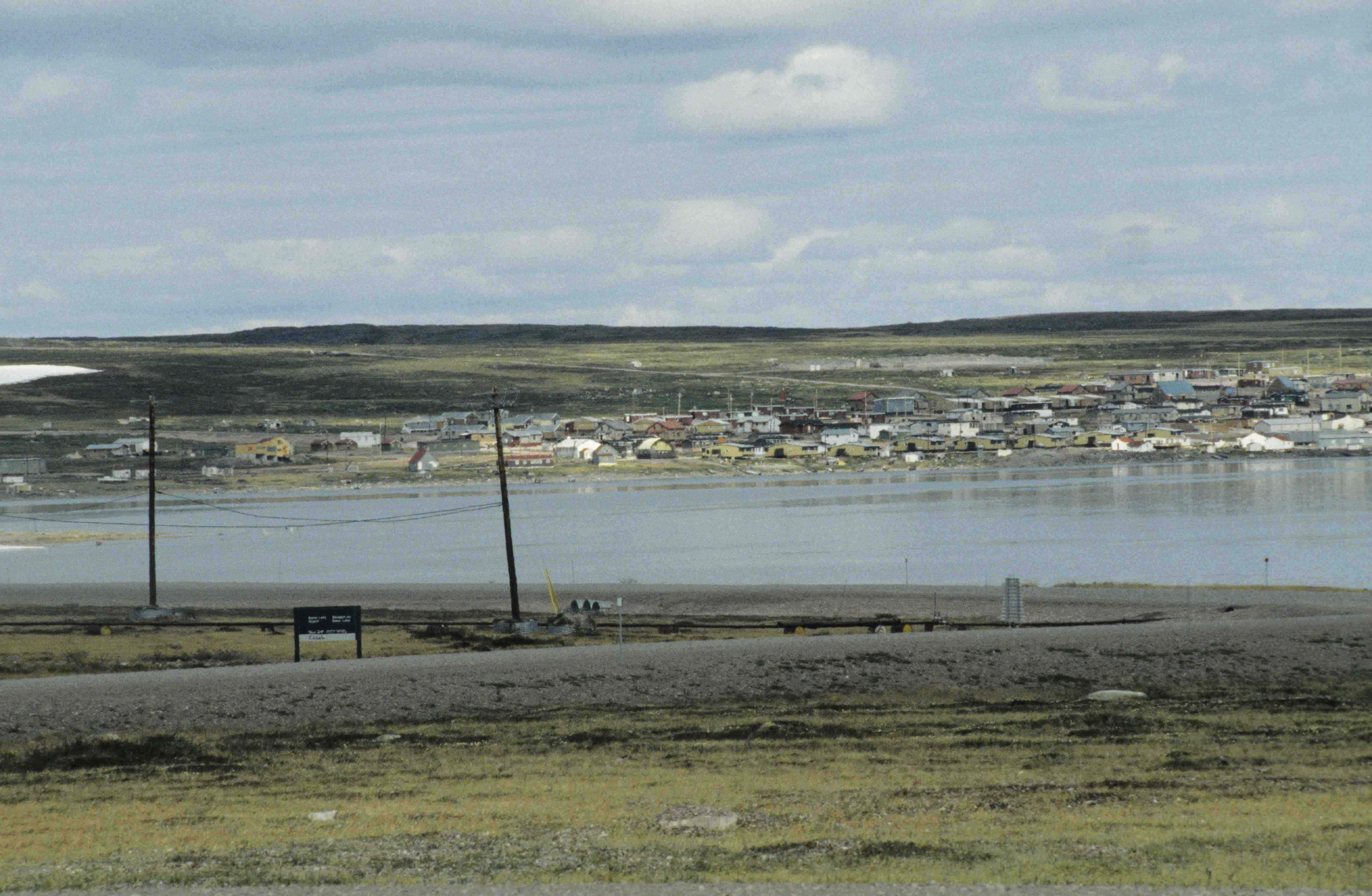
- Baker Lake, 1995

- Logo

- Location within Nunavut Location within Canada
- Coordinates: 64°19′10″N 096°01′15″W
- Country: Canada
- Territory: Nunavut
- Region: Kivalliq
- Electoral district: Baker Lake

Government
  - Type: Hamlet Council
  - Mayor: Kevin Iksiktaaryuk
  - MLAs: Craig Simailak

Area
  - Total: 179.54 km^{2} (69.32 sq mi)
  - Urban: 1.56 km^{2} (0.60 sq mi)
- Elevation: 18 m (59 ft)

Population (2021)
  - Total: 2,061
  - Density: 11.5/km^{2} (30/sq mi)
  - Urban: 1,653
  - Urban density: 1,060/km^{2} (2,700/sq mi)
- Time zone: UTC– 06:00 (CST)
  - Summer (DST): UTC– 05:00 (CDT)
- Canadian Postal code: X0C 0A0
- Area code: 867
- Website: www.bakerlake.ca

Baker Lake (Inuktitut syllabics: ᖃᒪᓂᑦᑐᐊᖅ 'big lake joined by a river at both ends', Inuktitut: Qamani'tuaq 'where the river widens') is a hamlet in the Kivalliq Region, in Nunavut on mainland Canada. Located on the shore of the namesake Baker Lake, it is notable for being Nunavut's sole inland community. The community was given its English name in 1761 from Captain William Christopher who named it after Sir William Baker, the 11th Governor of the Hudson's Bay Company.

== History ==
The area was the traditional summer hunting and fishing grounds for the Inuit. In 1762, the lake was explored by Captain Christopher of the Hudson’s Bay Company, who sailed up Chesterfield Inlet.

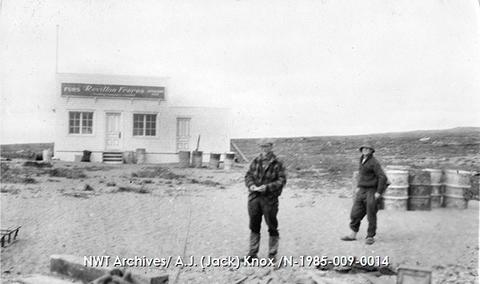
Revillon Freres trading post, 1929

In 1916, the Hudson's Bay Company (HBC) established a trading post at Baker Lake, originally set up on Baker Island at the mouth of the Kazan River. It operated as an outpost of Chesterfield Inlet until it became a full post 2 years later. In 1925, the Revillon Frères company founded a competing trading post at the mouth of the Thelon River, prompting the HBC to move its post to the mouth of this river as well.

Anglican missionaries followed in 1927. The Royal Canadian Mounted Police had been in the area for fifteen years before establishing a post at Baker Lake in 1930. In 1936, Revillon Frères folded, and the HBC took over its buildings.

In 1946 the population was 32, of which 25 were Inuit. A small hospital was built in 1957, followed by a regional school the next year. During the 1950s, caribou were scarce and starvation threatened, prompting the government to relocate the Inuit from their inland camps to Baker Lake. By the mid-1960s, most of the nomadic Inuit from the Baker Lake, Kazan, Thelon, and Back River areas had settled in the community.

In 1959, the HBC post became part of its Northern Stores Department. HBC divested this department in 1987 to The North West Company, which still operates a Northern Store at Baker Lake.

In 1979 the Baker Lake Hunters and Trappers Association and the Inuit Tapirisat of Canada (ITK) took the Canadian federal government to court for giving exploration licences to mining companies in areas where the Inuit hunt caribou. Judge Mahoney of the Federal Court of Canada, in Hamlet of Baker Lake v. Minister of Indian Affairs, recognized the existence of Aboriginal Title in Nunavut.The plaintiffs were concerned that "government-licensed exploration companies were interfering with their aboriginal rights, specifically, their right to hunt caribou."

Videos of elders sharing oral histories have been collected by Inuit students as part of the Nunavut Teacher Education Program.

== Geography ==
Located 320 km (200 mi) inland from Hudson Bay, it is near the nation's geographical centre. The hamlet is located at the mouth of the Thelon River on the shore of Baker Lake.

=== Climate ===
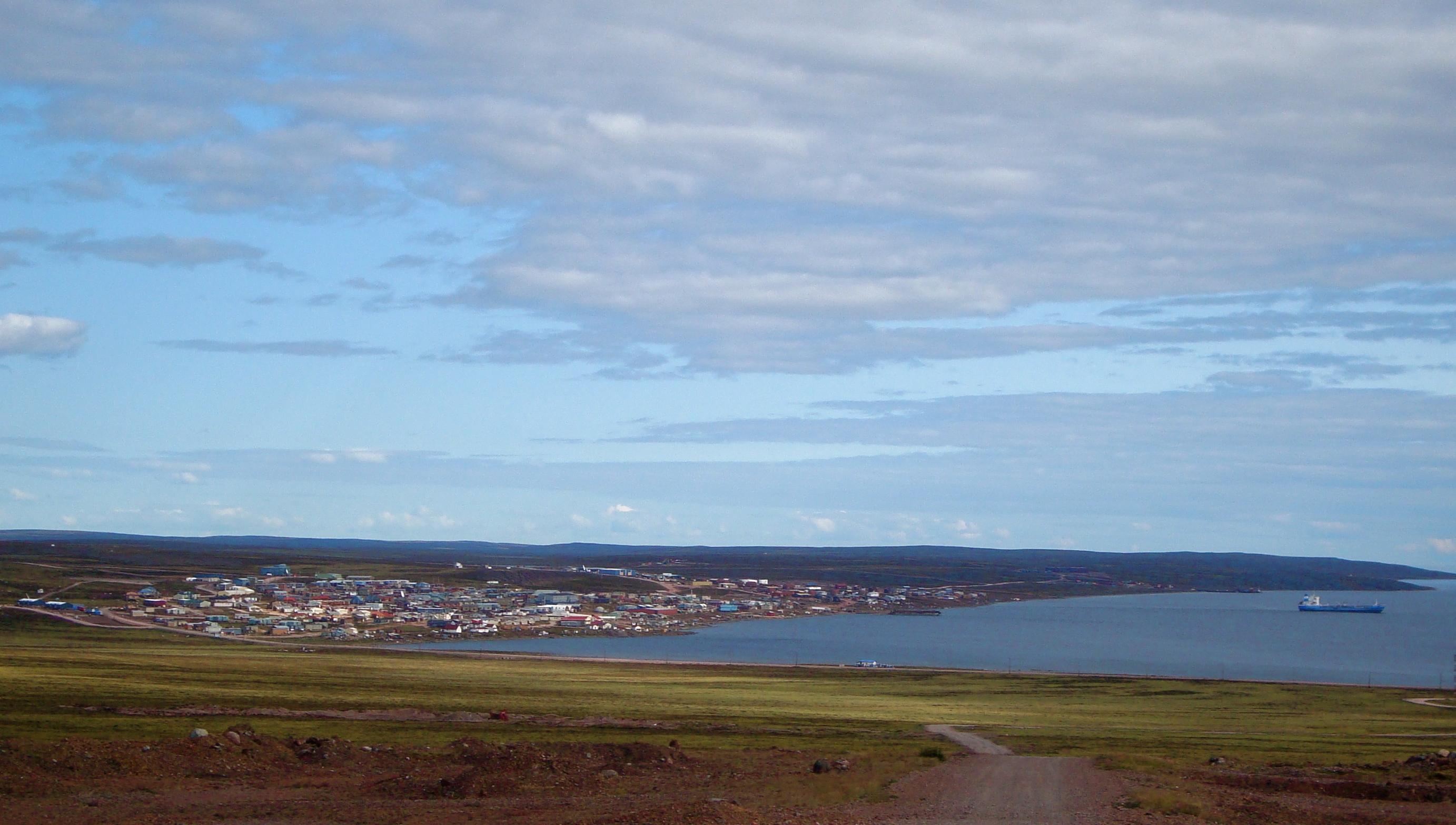
Baker Lake in autumn 2009

Baker Lake features a subarctic climate (Köppen climate classification: Dfc), bordering closely on a tundra climate, with short, cool summers and long, extremely cold winters. Winters run from October/November until April/May with temperatures averaging between −21 and −25 °C (−6 and −13 °F). In contrast to Fairbanks, Alaska on a similar parallel, May is a subfreezing month and June is chilly considering the long hours of daylight.

Summers are usually cool, short and rainy, but can be hot and sometimes humid; the record high is 33.6 °C (92.5 °F). Under the Nordenskjöld formula for distinguishing polar from non-polar climates, however, Baker Lake's climate is polar (Köppen ET) because with a coldest-month mean of −31.3 °C (−24.3 °F), the warmest-month mean would need to be above 12.1 °C (53.8 °F) to keep Baker Lake out of the polar category, while Baker Lake's warmest-month mean is only 11.6 °C (52.9 °F). The lack of trees at Baker Lake vindicates this judgement.

Climate data for Baker Lake (Baker Lake Airport) WMO ID: 71926; coordinates 64°17′56″N 96°04′40″W; elevation: 18.6 m (61 ft); 1991–2020 normals, extremes 1946–present
Month	Jan	Feb	Mar	Apr	May	Jun	Jul	Aug	Sep	Oct	Nov	Dec	Year
Record high humidex	−2.0	−2.7	1.2	4.1	15.2	33.1	37.8	33.4	26.1	13.5	1.7	1.0	37.8
Record high °C (°F)	−1.7 (28.9)	−2.6 (27.3)	1.5 (34.7)	5.0 (41.0)	16.2 (61.2)	30.9 (87.6)	33.6 (92.5)	30.9 (87.6)	24.2 (75.6)	13.5 (56.3)	2.2 (36.0)	1.1 (34.0)	33.6 (92.5)
Mean daily maximum °C (°F)	−27.0 (−16.6)	−27.1 (−16.8)	−21.8 (−7.2)	−12.5 (9.5)	−2.6 (27.3)	10.0 (50.0)	17.5 (63.5)	15.0 (59.0)	6.8 (44.2)	−3.1 (26.4)	−14.6 (5.7)	−22.2 (−8.0)	−6.8 (19.8)
Daily mean °C (°F)	−30.5 (−22.9)	−30.7 (−23.3)	−26.1 (−15.0)	−17.0 (1.4)	−6.0 (21.2)	5.5 (41.9)	12.1 (53.8)	10.4 (50.7)	3.4 (38.1)	−6.1 (21.0)	−18.4 (−1.1)	−25.9 (−14.6)	−10.8 (12.6)
Mean daily minimum °C (°F)	−34.0 (−29.2)	−34.2 (−29.6)	−30.3 (−22.5)	−21.5 (−6.7)	−9.4 (15.1)	1.0 (33.8)	6.7 (44.1)	5.9 (42.6)	0.1 (32.2)	−9.0 (15.8)	−22.1 (−7.8)	−29.5 (−21.1)	−14.7 (5.5)
Record low °C (°F)	−50.6 (−59.1)	−50.0 (−58.0)	−50.0 (−58.0)	−41.1 (−42.0)	−27.8 (−18.0)	−13.9 (7.0)	−1.7 (28.9)	−3.4 (25.9)	−14.4 (6.1)	−30.6 (−23.1)	−42.7 (−44.9)	−45.6 (−50.1)	−50.6 (−59.1)
Record low wind chill	−71.5	−70.5	−66.1	−58.5	−42.3	−23.5	−5.8	−10.2	−23.0	−46.9	−59.2	−64.0	−71.5
Average precipitation mm (inches)	7.3 (0.29)	6.0 (0.24)	10.8 (0.43)	12.5 (0.49)	16.0 (0.63)	21.5 (0.85)	35.8 (1.41)	48.5 (1.91)	47.0 (1.85)	25.1 (0.99)	15.6 (0.61)	11.7 (0.46)	257.9 (10.15)
Average rainfall mm (inches)	0.0 (0.0)	0.0 (0.0)	0.0 (0.0)	0.1 (0.00)	3.9 (0.15)	18.7 (0.74)	37.3 (1.47)	47.6 (1.87)	39.3 (1.55)	5.2 (0.20)	0.0 (0.0)	0.1 (0.00)	152.3 (6.00)
Average snowfall cm (inches)	6.8 (2.7)	7.8 (3.1)	10.8 (4.3)	14.0 (5.5)	12.7 (5.0)	1.8 (0.7)	0.0 (0.0)	0.0 (0.0)	7.1 (2.8)	21.4 (8.4)	18.9 (7.4)	12.0 (4.7)	113.3 (44.6)
Average precipitation days (≥ 0.2 mm)	7.4	5.8	8.2	6.6	7.2	8.0	8.6	11.6	11.5	12.8	10.3	9.1	107.1
Average rainy days (≥ 0.2 mm)	0.0	0.0	0.0	0.14	2.0	7.0	9.0	10.7	9.5	2.3	0.0	0.06	40.5
Average snowy days (≥ 0.2 cm)	5.6	5.5	6.8	7.0	5.9	1.3	0.0	0.04	3.2	10.8	10.3	7.4	63.9
Average relative humidity (%) (at 1500 LST)	66.7	65.5	68.8	76.2	80.6	65.5	57.1	63.5	72.4	83.6	76.1	69.7	70.5
Mean monthly sunshine hours	35.8	107.1	189.6	234.5	264.3	262.4	301.1	210.6	107.4	72.3	51	7.1	1,843.2
Source: Environment and Climate Change Canada (sunshine 1951–1980)

=== Wildlife ===
Baker Lake is host to a variety of wildlife including caribou, muskox, Arctic hares, wolves, wolverines, sik-siks, geese, and lake trout among others.

== Demographics ==
In the 2021 Canadian census conducted by Statistics Canada, Baker Lake had a population of 2,061 living in 577 of its 661 total private dwellings, a change of −0.4% from its 2016 population of 2,069. With a land area of 179.54 km^{2} (69.32 sq mi), it had a population density of 11.5/km^{2} (29.7/sq mi) in 2021.

Federal census population history of Baker Lake

Year	Pop.	±%
1976	863	—
1981	954	+10.5%
1986	1,009	+5.8%
1991	1,186	+17.5%
1996	1,385	+16.8%

Year	Pop.	±%
2001	1,507	+8.8%
2006	1,728	+14.7%
2011	1,872	+8.3%
2016	2,069	+10.5%
2021	2,061	−0.4%

Source: Statistics Canada

Baker Lake is home to eleven Inuit groups:

- Ahiarmiut/Ihalmiut, originally from the north of Back River area, and from Ennadai Lake
- Akilinirmiut, originally from the Akiliniq Hills, Thelon River area of Beverly Lake, Dubawnt Lake, Aberdeen Lake
- Hanningajurmiut, originally from Garry Lake
- Harvaqtuurmiut, originally from the Kazan River area
- Hauniqturmiut, originally from Whale Cove's south, between Sandy Point and Arviat
- Iluilirmiut / Illuilirmiut, originally from Adelaide Peninsula (Iluilik), Chantrey Inlet area
- Kihlirnirmiut, originally from the Garry Lake area between Bathurst Inlet, Cambridge Bay
- Natsilingmiut, originally from Baker Lake area between Gjoa Haven, Taloyoak, Kugaaruk, Repulse Bay
- Padlermiut, originally from the Baker Lake to Arviat area
- Qaernermiut, originally from the lower Thelon River, Baker Lake, Chesterfield Inlet, Corbett Inlet areas, between Rankin Inlet and Whale Cove
- Utkuhiksalingmiut, originally from the Back River and Gjoa Haven/Wager Bay area

Panethnic groups in the Hamlet of Baker Lake (2001–2021)
Panethnic group	2021		2016		2011		2006		2001	
Panethnic group	Pop.	%	Pop.	%	Pop.	%	Pop.	%	Pop.	%
Indigenous	1,920	93.43%	1,900	92.68%	1,745	93.57%	1,565	90.99%	1,420	94.35%
European (Note: Statistic includes all persons that did not make up part of a visible minority or an indigenous identity.)	105	5.11%	135	6.59%	115	6.17%	135	7.85%	85	5.65%
African	20	0.97%	20	0.98%	0	0%	0	0%	0	0%
East Asian (Note: Statistic includes total responses of "Chinese", "Korean", and "Japanese" under visible minority section on census.)	10	0.49%	0	0%	0	0%	0	0%	0	0%
Southeast Asian (Note: Statistic includes total responses of "Filipino" and "Southeast Asian" under visible minority section on census.)	0	0%	10	0.49%	0	0%	0	0%	0	0%
Middle Eastern (Note: Statistic includes total responses of "West Asian" and "Arab" under visible minority section on census.)	0	0%	10	0.49%	0	0%	0	0%	0	0%
South Asian	0	0%	0	0%	0	0%	20	1.16%	0	0%
Latin American	0	0%	0	0%	0	0%	0	0%	0	0%
Other/multiracial (Note: Statistic includes total responses of "Visible minority, n.i.e." and "Multiple visible minorities" under visible minority section on census.)	10	0.49%	0	0%	0	0%	0	0%	0	0%
Total responses	2,055	99.71%	2,050	99.08%	1,865	99.63%	1,720	99.54%	1,505	99.87%
Total population	2,061	100%	2,069	100%	1,872	100%	1,728	100%	1,507	100%
Note: Totals greater than 100% due to multiple origin responses

== Economy ==
Many of the town's residents work in the Meadowbank gold mine for Agnico Eagle Mines Limited. Much of the local infrastructure and logistics-related employment is based around aiding mineral exploration and mining efforts in the wider area. The main source of employment and growth in this sector is Canadian-based mining company Agnico Eagle Mines, which in 2010 began work at its Meadowbank mine site 110 km (68 mi) north of Baker Lake by road. The construction of the mine employed over 1,000 workers, over 30% of whom were locals from the general area of the Kivalliq Region. Along with employing local people, the company helped build cellphone towers to get the community connected to Northwestel's cellphone service. The coming of workers from all across Canada also helped developing tourism in this community. There is also potential for a uranium mine, called the Kiggavik Project, approximately 80 km to the west, which is being proposed by Orano Canada.

== Arts and culture ==
Baker Lake is known for its Inuit art, such as wall hangings, basalt stone sculptures and stone cut prints. The community has been home to internationally exhibited artists such as Matthew Agigaaq, Elizabeth Angrnaqquaq, Luke Anguhadluq, Barnabus Arnasungaaq, David Ikutaq, Toona Iquliq, Janet Nungnik, Jessie Oonark, Ruth Qaulluaryuk, Irene Avaalaaqiaq Tiktaalaaq, Simon Tookoome, Marion Tuu'luq, and Marie Kuunnuaq.

The Jessie Oonark Arts and Crafts Centre, which opened in 1992, is a work area for the community's artists. It provides space for carving, print making, sewing and jewellery making. It is also home to Jessie Oonark Crafts Ltd. a subsidiary of the Nunavut Development Corporation, a Government of Nunavut crown corporation.

== Infrastructure ==
=== Transportation ===
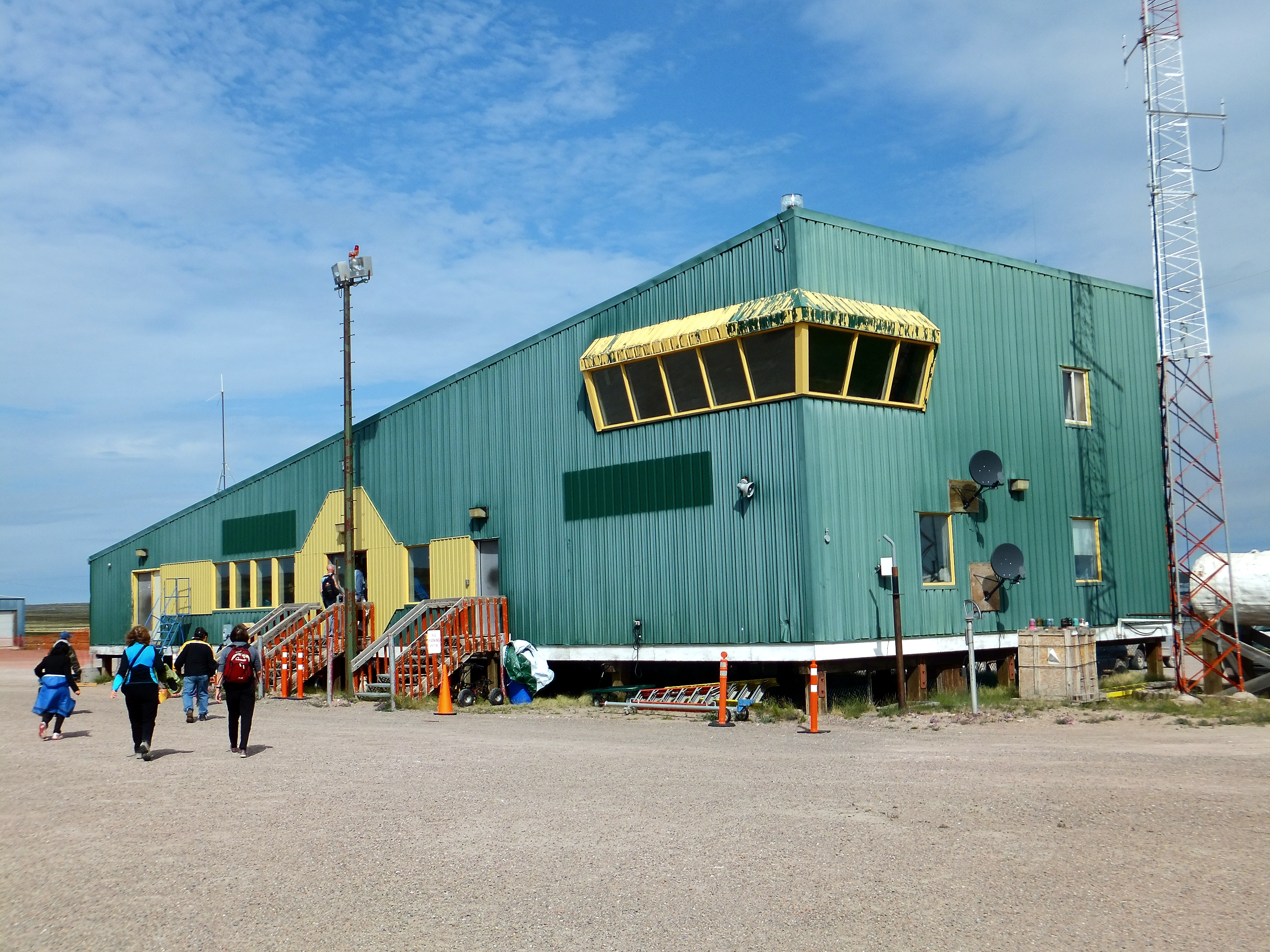
Baker Lake airport

The settlement is served by Baker Lake Airport, linking it to the nearby coastal town of Rankin Inlet, about 35 minutes away by air. Calm Air serves the town with at least two flights daily. Every day there are connecting flights to Winnipeg.

While the local road network does not connect to another community, there is an approximately 110 km (68 mi) all-weather gravel highway named Mine Road. It runs north, from the town to the Meadowbank Gold Mine and aerodrome. It was completed around 2019 and is among the longest highways in Nunavut. An 8 km (5.0 mi) road runs east from the townsite to the Geographic Centre of Canada monument.

=== Broadband communications ===
The community has been served by the Qiniq network since 2005. Qiniq is a fixed wireless service to homes and businesses, connecting to the outside world via a satellite backbone. The Qiniq network is designed and operated by SSi Canada. In 2017, the network was upgraded to 4G LTE technology, and 2G-GSM for mobile voice.

=== Services ===
Baker Lake has a women's shelter, health centre (Baker Lake Health Centre), dental clinic, heritage centre, visitor's centre, counselling centre, elders' centre, three hotels (Baker Lake Lodge, Iglu Hotel and Nunamiut Lodge), swimming pool, library, primary and secondary school (Rachel Arngnammaktiq Elementary School and Jonah Amitnaaq Secondary School), and youth centre.

There are three churches in the community, Anglican (St. Aidan's), Catholic (St. Paul's) and Glad Tidings.

== See also ==
- List of municipalities in Nunavut
- David Simailak
- Baker Lake Water Aerodrome
- Inuujarvik Territorial Park
- Glenn McLean
- William Noah
- Cosmos 954
- North-West Mounted Police in the Canadian north
- Super Shamou
