= List of lakes of the Northwest Territories =

This is an incomplete list of lakes of the Northwest Territories in Canada.

== Larger lake statistics ==

"The total area of a lake includes the area of islands. Lakes lying across provincial boundaries are listed in the province with the greater lake area."

Northwest Territories lakes larger than 400 km^{2} (150 sq mi)
Lake	Area (including islands)	Altitude	Depth max.	Volume
Great Bear Lake	31,328 km^{2} (12,096 sq mi)	156 m (512 ft)	446 m (1,463 ft)	2,236 km^{3} (536 cu mi)
Great Slave Lake	28,568 km^{2} (11,030 sq mi)	156 m (512 ft)	614 m (2,014 ft)	1,580 km^{3} (380 cu mi)
Lac La Martre	1,776 km^{2} (686 sq mi)	265 m (869 ft)	19.9 m (65 ft)	
Kasba Lake	1,341 km^{2} (518 sq mi)	336 m (1,102 ft)		
MacKay Lake	1,061 km^{2} (410 sq mi)	431 m (1,414 ft)		
Hottah Lake	918 km^{2} (354 sq mi)	180 m (590 ft)		
Aylmer Lake	847 km^{2} (327 sq mi)	375 m (1,230 ft)		
Nonacho Lake	784 km^{2} (303 sq mi)	354 m (1,161 ft)		
Clinton-Colden Lake	737 km^{2} (285 sq mi)	375 m (1,230 ft)		
Selwyn Lake	717 km^{2} (277 sq mi)	398 m (1,306 ft)		
Point Lake	701 km^{2} (271 sq mi)	375 m (1,230 ft)		
Wholdaia Lake	678 km^{2} (262 sq mi)	364 m (1,194 ft)		
Lac de Gras	633 km^{2} (244 sq mi)	396 m (1,299 ft)	56 m (184 ft)	
Buffalo Lake	612 km^{2} (236 sq mi)	265 m (869 ft)		
Tathlina Lake	573 km^{2} (221 sq mi)	280 m (920 ft)		
Artillery Lake	551 km^{2} (213 sq mi)	364 m (1,194 ft)		
Snowbird Lake	505 km^{2} (195 sq mi)	359 m (1,178 ft)		
Sambaa K'e	504 km^{2} (195 sq mi)	503 m (1,650 ft)		
Lac des Bois	469 km^{2} (181 sq mi)	297 m (974 ft)		
Colville Lake	455 km^{2} (176 sq mi)	245 m (804 ft)		
Faber Lake	439 km^{2} (169 sq mi)	213 m (699 ft)		

== List of lakes ==
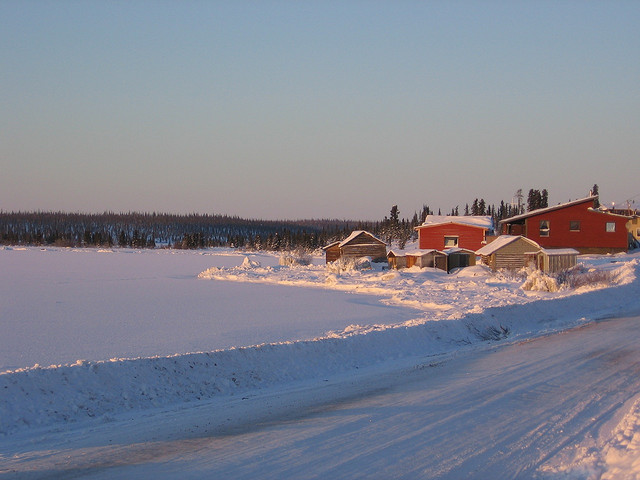
Deline on Great Bear Lake

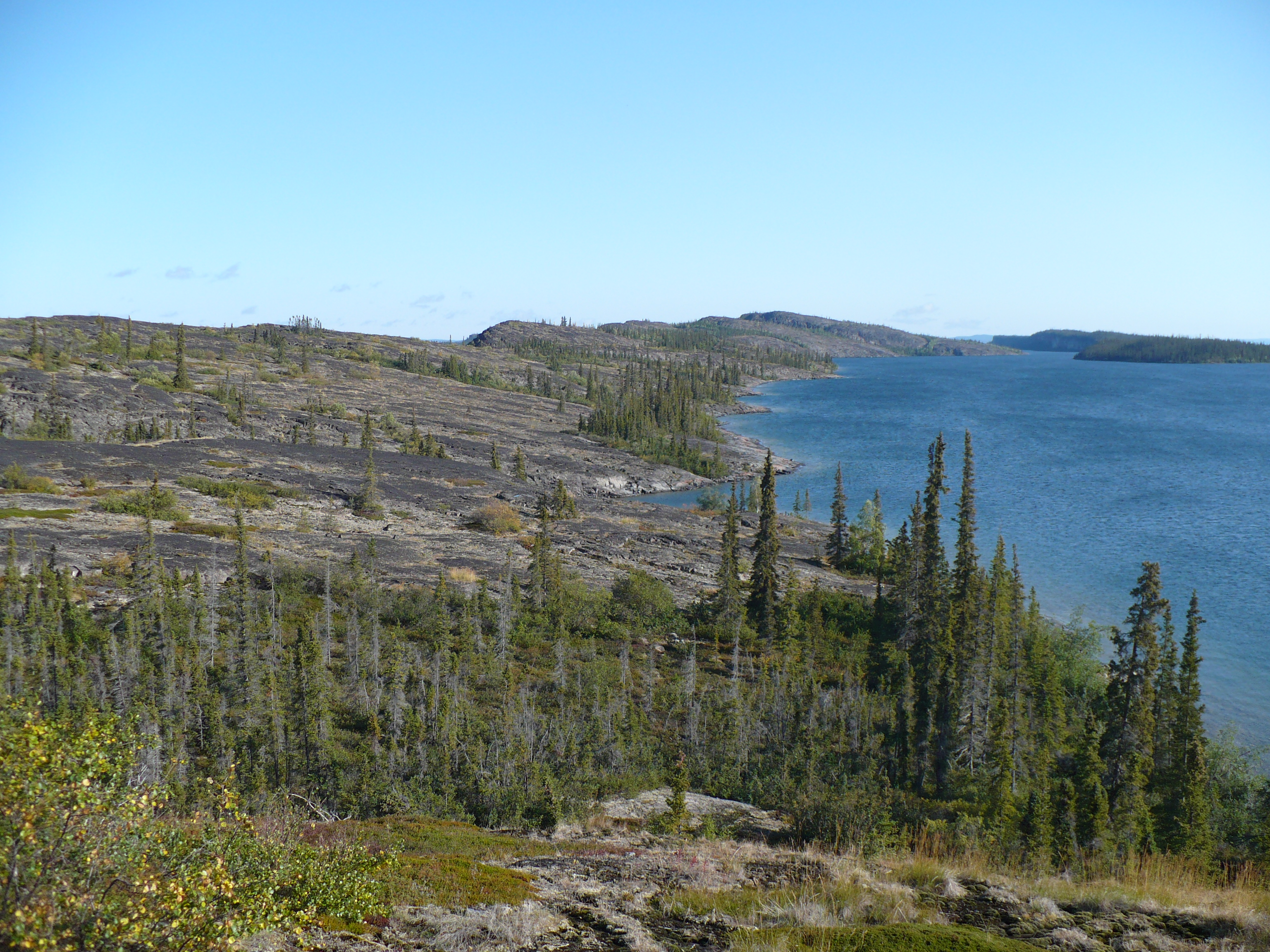
Utsingi Point on Great Slave Lake

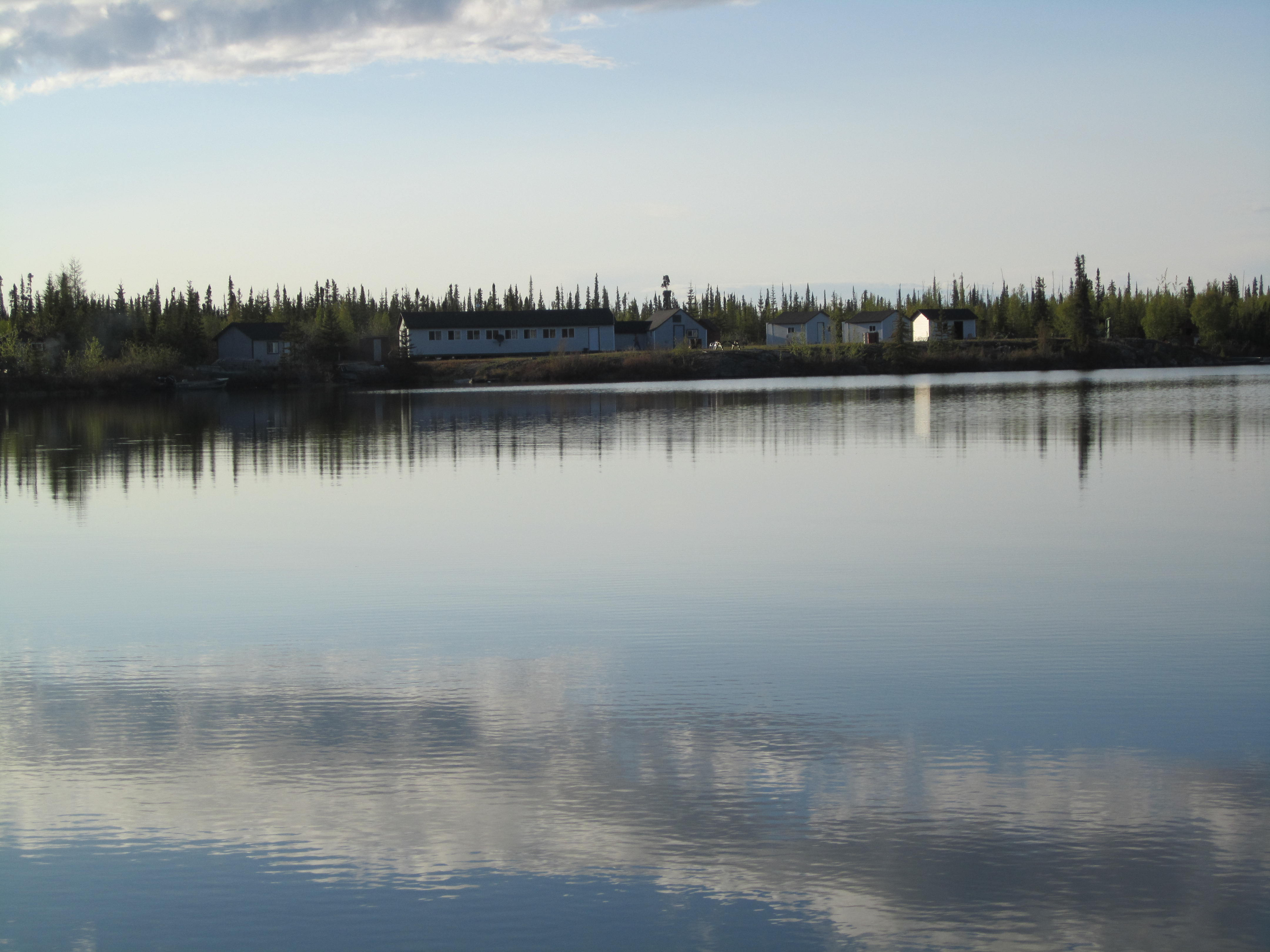
Lac La Martre

- Artillery Lake
- Aylmer Lake
- Basler Lake
- Blackwater Lake
- Boyd Lake
- Buffalo Lake
- Clinton-Colden Lake
- Colville Lake
- Faber Lake
- Firedrake Lake
- Frame Lake
- Great Bear Lake
- Great Slave Lake
- Hardisty Lake
- Hjalmer Lake
- Hottah Lake
- Howard Lake
- Kakisa Lake
- Kasba Lake in the Northwest Territories and Nunavut
- Keller Lake
- Lac Belot
- Lac de Gras
- Lac des bois
- Lac La Martre
- Lac Maunoir
- Lynx Lake
- MacKay Lake
- Man Drowned Himself Lake
- McArthur Lake
- Mosquito Lake
- Nonacho Lake
- Point Lake
- Scott Lake in Saskatchewan and the Northwest Territories
- Selwyn Lake in the Northwest Territories and Saskatchewan
- Sitidyi Lake
- Snowbird Lake
- Tahiryuak Lake
- Tathlina Lake
- Trout Lake
- Whitefish Lake
- Wholdaia Lake

== See also ==
- List of lakes of Canada
