= Dubawnt Lake =

Lake in Nunavut, Canada

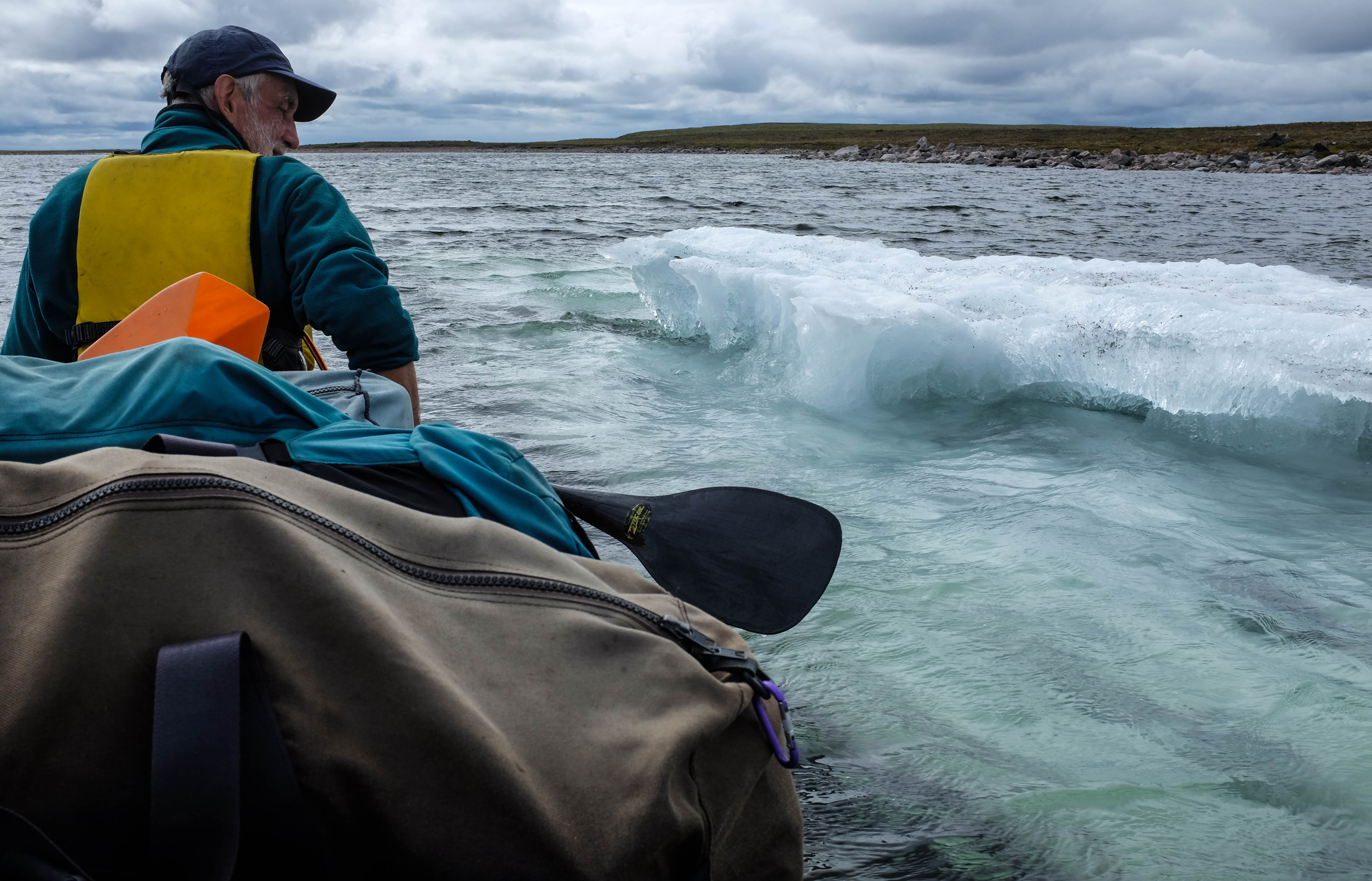
- Dubawnt Lake, late July 2015

- Location in Nunavut Dubawnt Lake (Canada)
- Location: Kivalliq Region, Nunavut
- Coordinates: 63°4′0″N 101°42′0″W
- Lake type: Glacial
- Primary inflows: Dubawnt River
- Primary outflows: Dubawnt River
- Basin countries: Canada
- Surface area: 3,833 km^{2} (1,480 sq mi)
- Surface elevation: 236 m (774 ft)
- Islands: Snow Island
- Settlements: uninhabited

Dubawnt Lake is a lake in the Kivalliq Region, Nunavut, Canada. It is 3,630 km^{2} (1,400 sq mi) in size and has several islands. It is about 320 km (200 mi) north of the Four Corners, about 480 km (300 mi) west of Hudson Bay and about 400 km (250 mi) south of the Arctic Circle. To the northwest is the Thelon Wildlife Sanctuary. Its main inlet and outlet is the north-flowing Dubawnt River which joins the Thelon River at Beverly Lake. The Thelon flows east to Hudson Bay at Chesterfield Inlet. It is on the line of contact between the Sayisi Dene band of Eastern Caribou-Eater Chipewyan people and the Harvaqtuurmiut and Ihalmiut bands of Caribou Inuit. The first recorded European to reach the lake was Samuel Hearne in 1770, but it remained largely unknown to outsiders until it was explored by Joseph Tyrrell in 1893. There are no permanent settlements but there are fly-in fish camps where large lake trout can be caught during the two month ice-free season.

== Dubawnt River ==
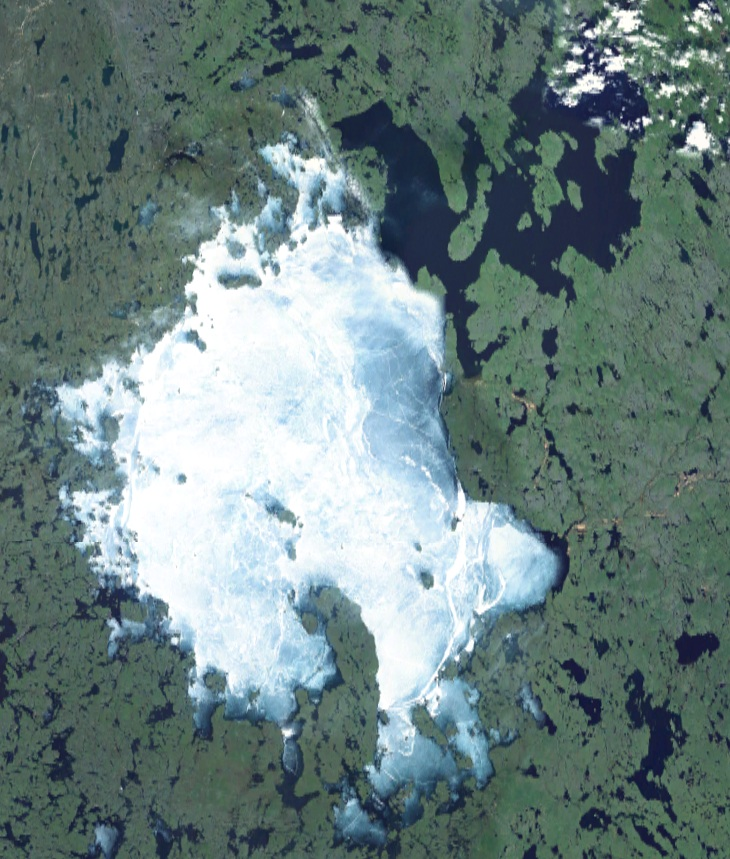
Dubawnt lake

The Dubawnt River is 874 km (543 mi) long and begins in the Northwest Territories from a tributary of Wholdaia Lake northwest of the Four Corners. There is a portage from the Flett Lake tributary of Wholdaia Lake to Selwyn Lake which drains southwest to Lake Athabasca. In 1893 Joseph Tyrrell canoed from Lake Athabasca down the Dubawnt to Chesterfield Inlet. Lakes along the river are Wholdaia, Barlow, Cary, Markham, Nicholson, Dubawnt, (Dubawnt Gorge), Grant, Wharton and Beverly. East of the Dubawnt, the Kazan River also flows north to join the Thelon.

== Ethnography ==
The area of the lake was once home to Ihalmiut, a Caribou Inuit group.

== Wildlife ==
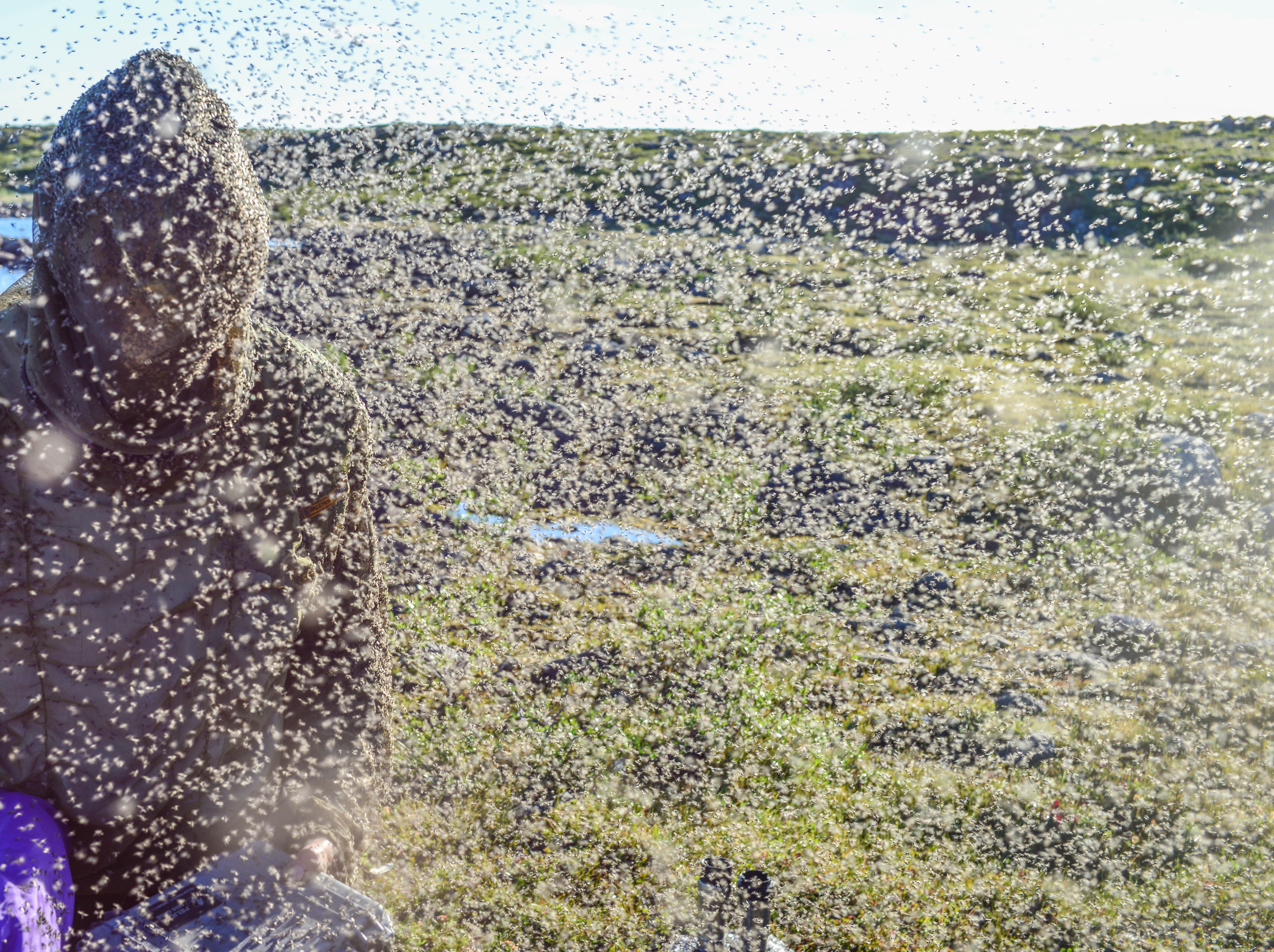
Black flies along the Dubawnt River.

Dubawnt Lake is home to many animals, including blackflies, foxes, wolves and many birds of prey.

== See also ==
- List of lakes of Nunavut
- List of lakes of Canada
