= Mosquito Lake =

Mosquito Lake may refer to:

- Mosquito Lake, Alaska, a community in the United States
- Mosquito Lake (Northwest Territories), a lake in Canada
- Mosquito Lake (Whatcom County, Washington), a lake in Washington
- Mosquito Lake (TV series), a short-lived Canadian television sitcom
