= Snowbird =

Snowbird may refer to:

== Places ==
- Snowbird, Utah, an unincorporated area and associated ski resort in the United States
- Snowbird Lake, a lake in the Northwest Territories, Canada
- Snowbird Glacier, a hanging alpine glacier in the Talkeetna Mountains of Alaska, United States
- Snowbird Mountain, a crest on the Appalachian Trail east of Del Rio, Tennessee, United States

== Arts, entertainment, and media ==
=== Films ===
- The Snowbird, a 1916 silent movie

=== Fictional characters ===
- Snowbird (character), a Marvel Comics character
- Snowbird, a penguin puppet who announces school closures on WSMV-TV in Nashville, Tennessee

=== Music ===
- Snowbird (band), a band featuring Simon Raymonde and Stephanie Dosen
- "Snowbird" (song), recorded by Anne Murray in 1970
  - Snowbird (album), 1970
- "Snowbird", a song by Janis Ian from her 1969 album Who Really Cares
- "Snowbirds", a 2023 song by Cory Marks

== Other uses ==
- Snowbird (person), a person who migrates from the colder northern parts of North America to warmer southern locales, typically during the winter
- Snowbird, an alternative name for dark-eyed junco
- Snow Bird, an N-class blimp
- Snowbirds (aerobatic team), a Canadian air show flight demonstration team
- Snowbird (sailboat), an Olympic sailboat during the 1932 Summer Olympics
- Snowbird Airlines, a charter airline in Finland
- Snowbird, the call sign for Skytraders, an Australian airline.
- Snowbird Mountain Lodge, an historic hotel property in rural Graham County, North Carolina, United States
- Snowbird Tectonic Zone (STZ) is a geological structure in the western Canadian Shield
- UTIAS Snowbird, a human-powered ornithopter built at University of Toronto Institute for Aerospace Studies, Canada
