= Belot (disambiguation) =

Belot may refer to:

- Belot, a trick-taking card game
- Lac Belot, a lake in the Northwest Territories, Canada
- Adolphe Belot (1829–1890), French playwright and novelist
- Émile Belot (1857-1944), a French engineer and astronomer.
- Gustave Belot (1859-1929), a French philosopher and educational administrator.
- Claude Belot, a French politician
- Dame Belot, alias Octavie Guichard (1719–1805), a French writer
- Franck Belot (b. 1972), a French rugby union player
- Monti Belot, a United States federal judge
- Victor R. Belot, French historian, writer and painter (1923–2000)

== See also ==
- Belote, another trick-taking card game
