= Lac La Martre =

Lake in Northwest Territories, Canada

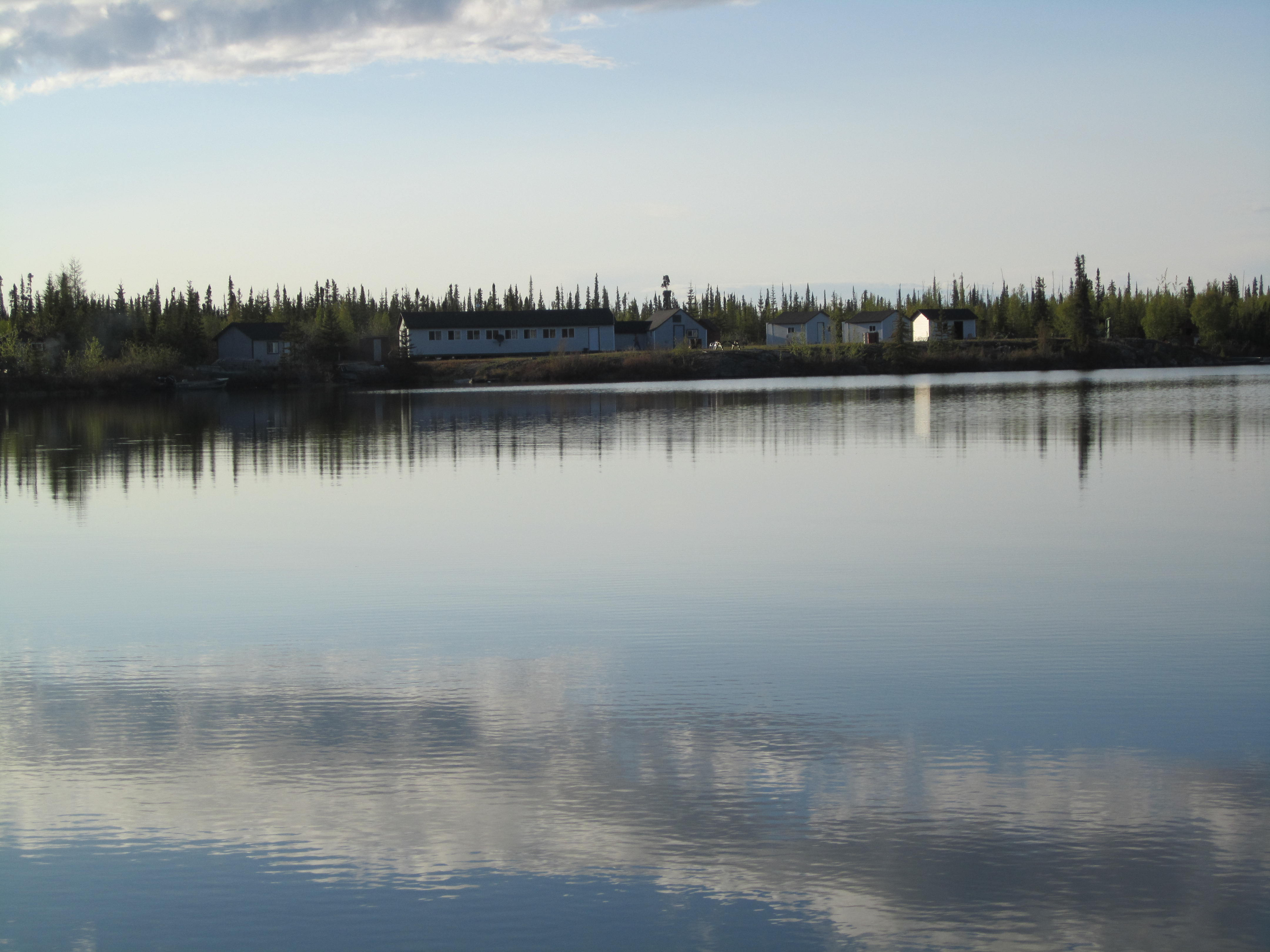

- Location within Northwest Territories

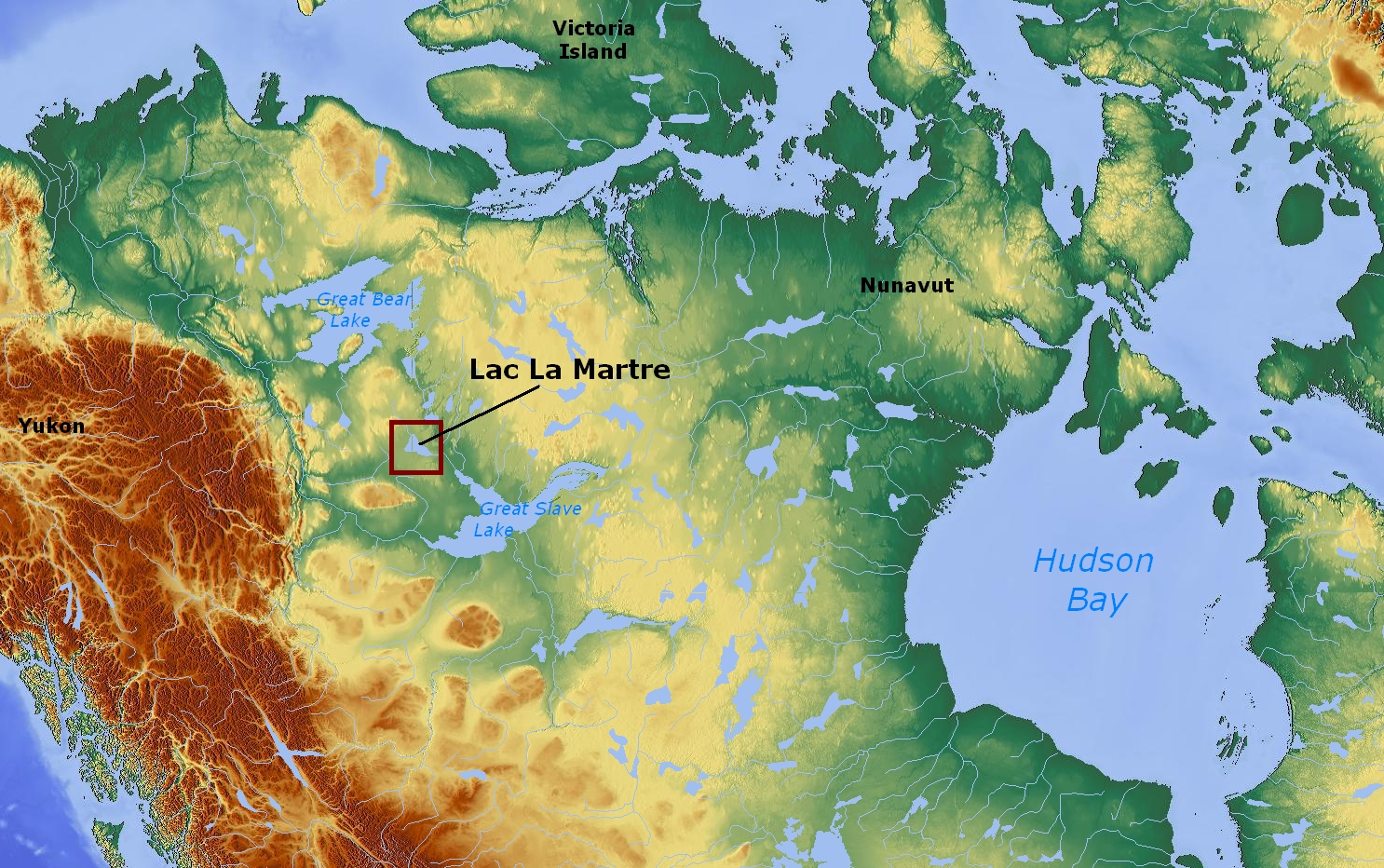
- Location: Northwest Territories
- Coordinates: 63°15′01″N 117°55′05″W
- Type: Glacial
- Basin countries: Canada
- Max. length: 76 km (47 mi)
- Max. width: 25 km (16 mi)
- Surface area: 1,776 km^{2} (686 sq mi)
- Average depth: 9.1 m (30 ft)
- Max. depth: 19.8 m (65 ft)
- Surface elevation: 265 m (869 ft)
- Frozen: Mid October to mid June
- Settlements: Whatì

Lac La Martre, is the third largest lake in the Northwest Territories, Canada. It is located approximately 201 km (125 mi) northwest of the territorial capital of Yellowknife. The Tłı̨chǫ community of Whatì (formerly called Lac La Martre) is located on the east shore of Lac La Martre.

== Fauna ==
The lake is located on a main north/south bird migration route. Hundreds of thousands of ducks, geese and other migratory bird species gather to feed in the marshes.

== Demographics ==
Whatì, a small First Nations community with a population of 470, is located on the shores of the lake.

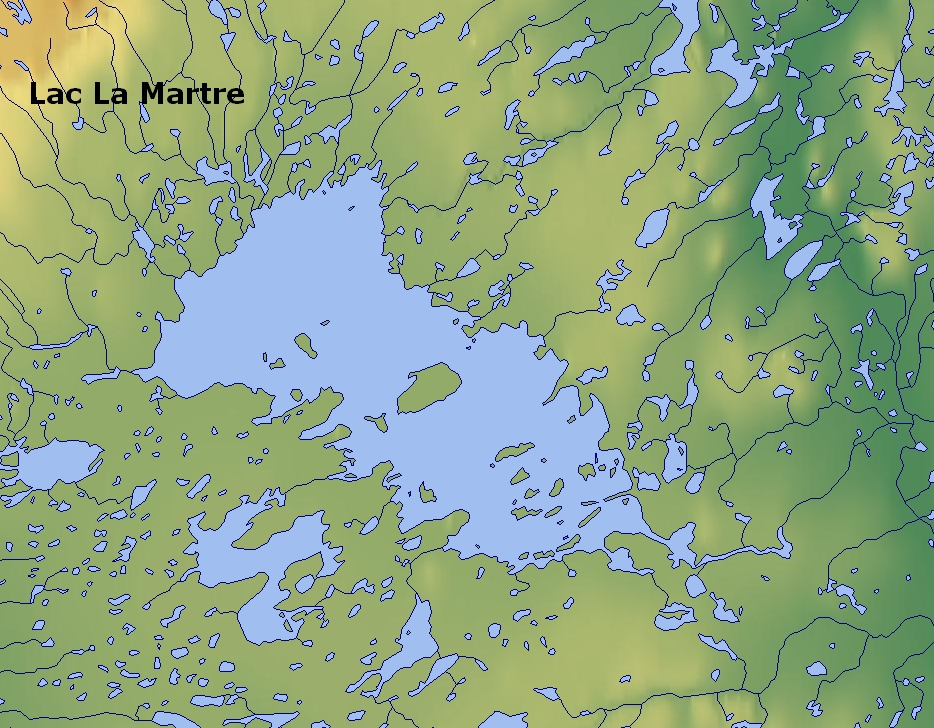
Map

== See also ==
- List of lakes of Canada
- List of lakes of the Northwest Territories
