= Scott Lake (Northwest Territories–Saskatchewan) =

Lake in northern Canada

- Location in Saskatchewan Scott Lake (Canada)
- Location: Saskatchewan; Northwest Territories
- Coordinates: 59°58′N 106°9′W
- Part of: Mackenzie River drainage basin
- Basin countries: Canada
- Surface area: 37,223 ha (91,980 acres)
- Shore length^{1}: 528 km (328 mi)
- Surface elevation: 442 m (1,450 ft)
- Settlements: None
- ^{1} Shore length is not a well-defined measure.

Scott Lake is a lake of northern Saskatchewan and the Northwest Territories of Canada. On a 5-hectare (12-acre) island in the lake, near the 60th parallel, is Scott Lake Lodge, which is a fly-in fishing lodge about 80 kilometres (50 mi) north-west of Stony Rapids.

== Fish species ==
Fish commonly found in Scott Lake include lake trout, lake whitefish, northern pike, and walleye.

== See also ==
- List of lakes of Saskatchewan
- List of lakes of the Northwest Territories
- Tourism in Saskatchewan
