= Blackwater Lake =

Lake in the Northwest Territories, Canada

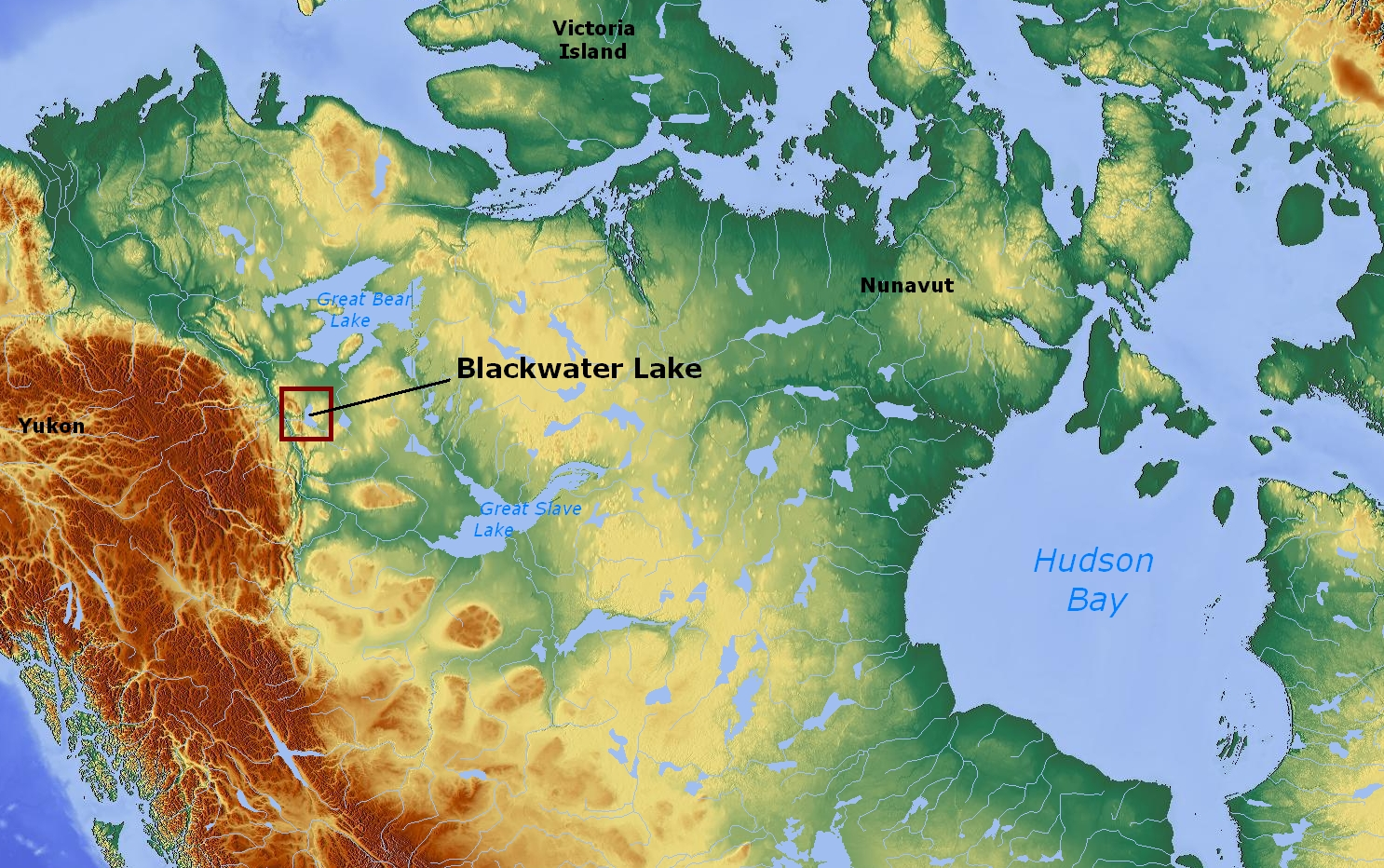

- Location within Northwest Territories
- Location: Northwest Territories
- Coordinates: 63°59′N 123°02′W
- Basin countries: Canada

Blackwater Lake is a lake in the Northwest Territories, Canada.

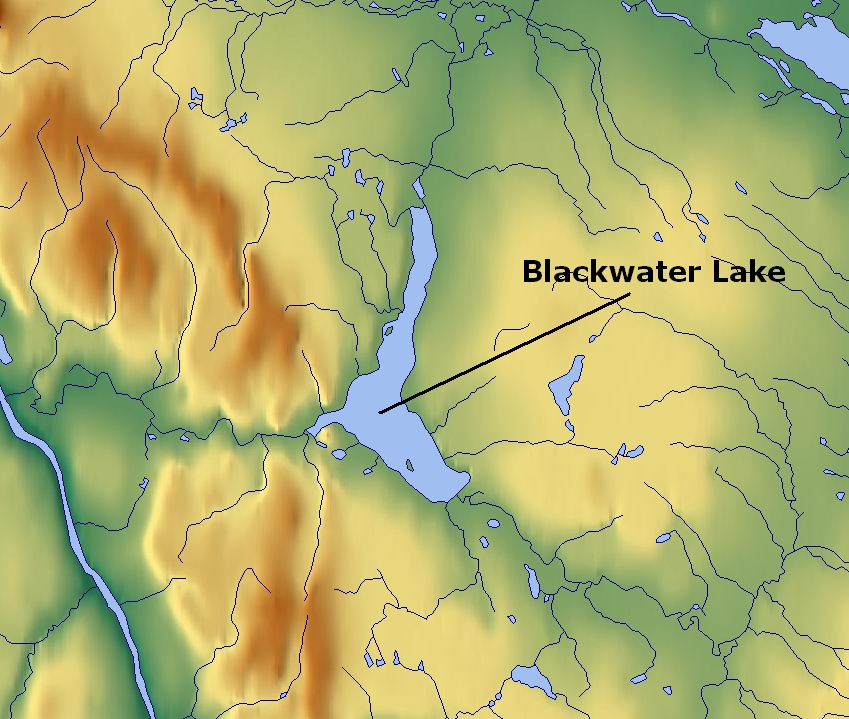
Map

== See also ==
- List of lakes in the Northwest Territories
