= Lynx Lake (Northwest Territories) =

Lake in the Northwest Territories, Canada

- Location within Northwest Territories

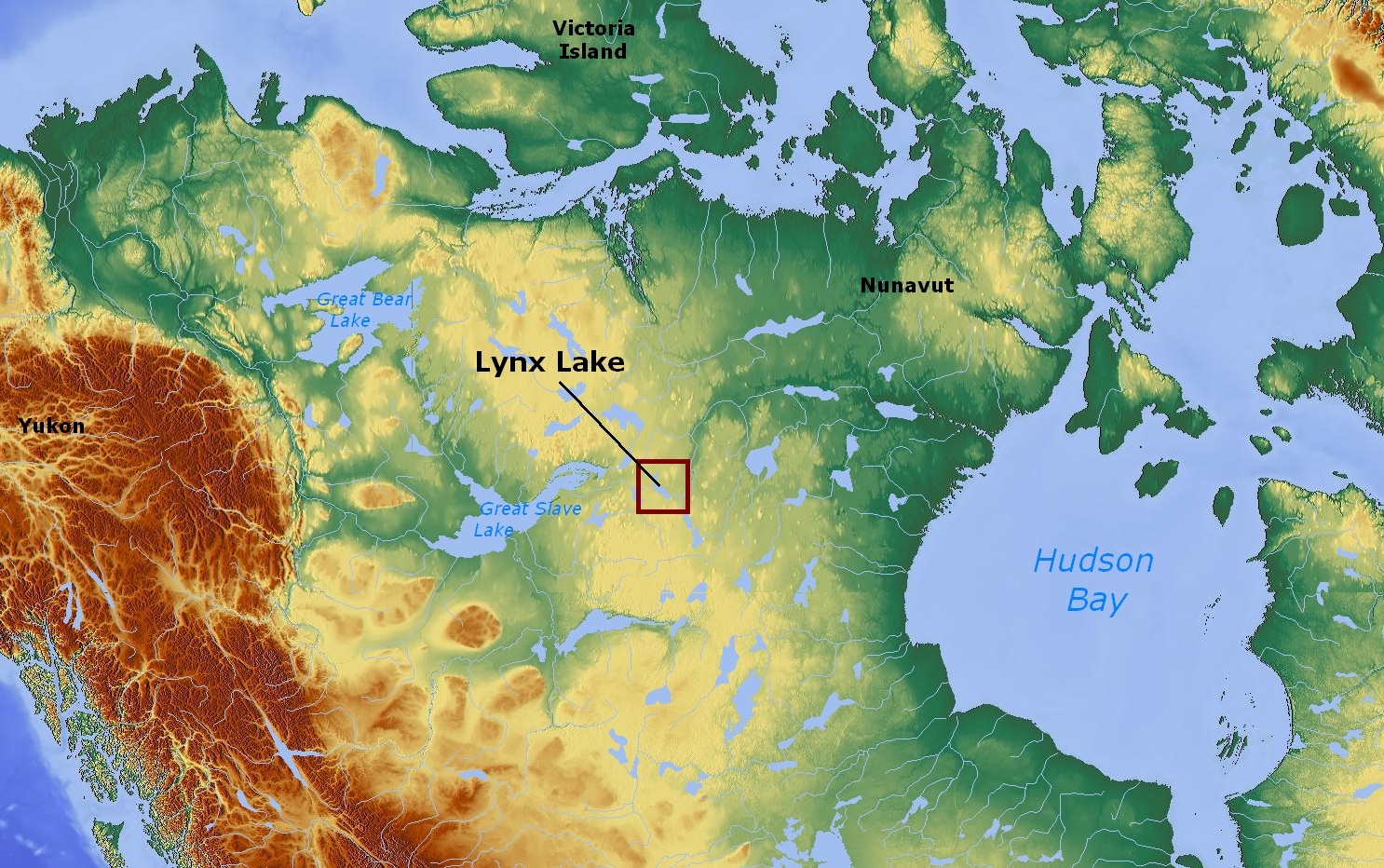
- Location: Northwest Territories
- Coordinates: 62°26′N 106°30′W
- Basin countries: Canada

Lynx Lake is a lake in the Northwest Territories, Canada.

== See also ==
- List of lakes in the Northwest Territories
