= Kasba Lake =

Lake in Northwest Territories, Canada

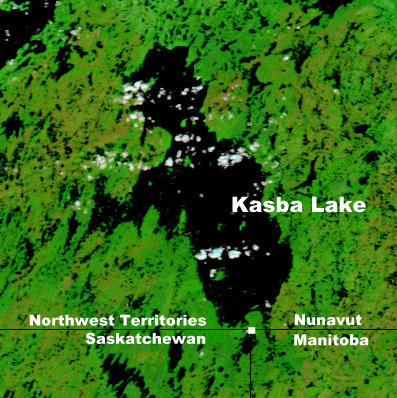
- NASA map showing Kasba Lake

- Location within Northwest Territories
- Location: Northwest Territories, Nunavut
- Coordinates: 60°17′00″N 102°00′22″W
- Primary outflows: Kazan River
- Basin countries: Canada
- Surface area: 1,341 km^{2} (518 sq mi)
- Surface elevation: 336 m (1,102 ft)

Kasba Lake is a lake in the northern Canadian wilderness. The majority of the lake lies within the Northwest Territories, but a small section is in Nunavut. The lake is close to Canada's four corners. A seasonal fishing lodge is open to tourists each summer.

== See also ==
- Kasba Lake Airport
- Kasba Lake Water Aerodrome
- List of lakes of the Northwest Territories
- List of lakes of Canada
