= Mosquito Lake (Northwest Territories) =

Lake in Canada

- Location within Northwest Territories

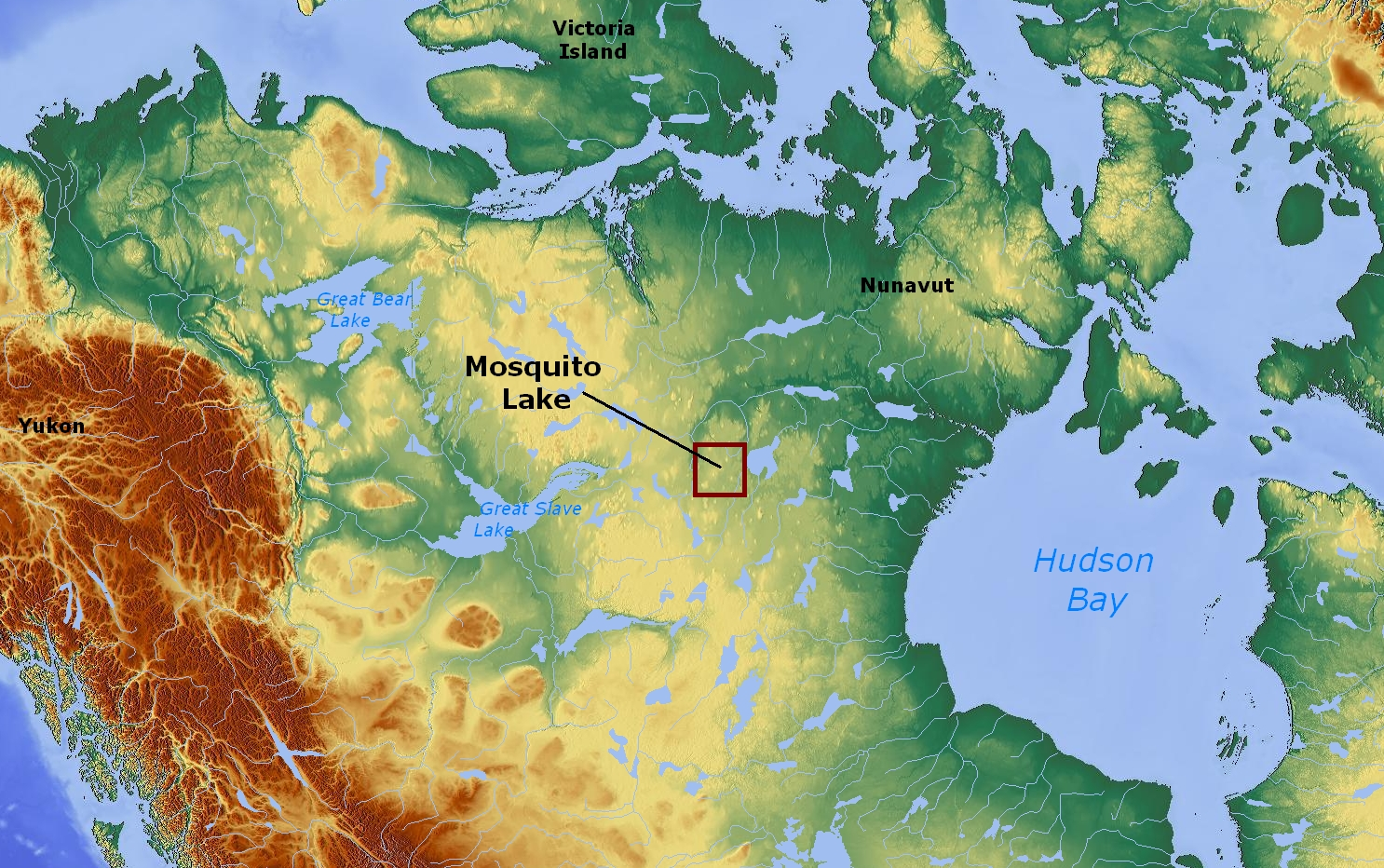
- Location: Northwest Territories
- Coordinates: 62°35′N 103°20′W
- Basin countries: Canada

Mosquito Lake is a lake in the Northwest Territories, Canada.

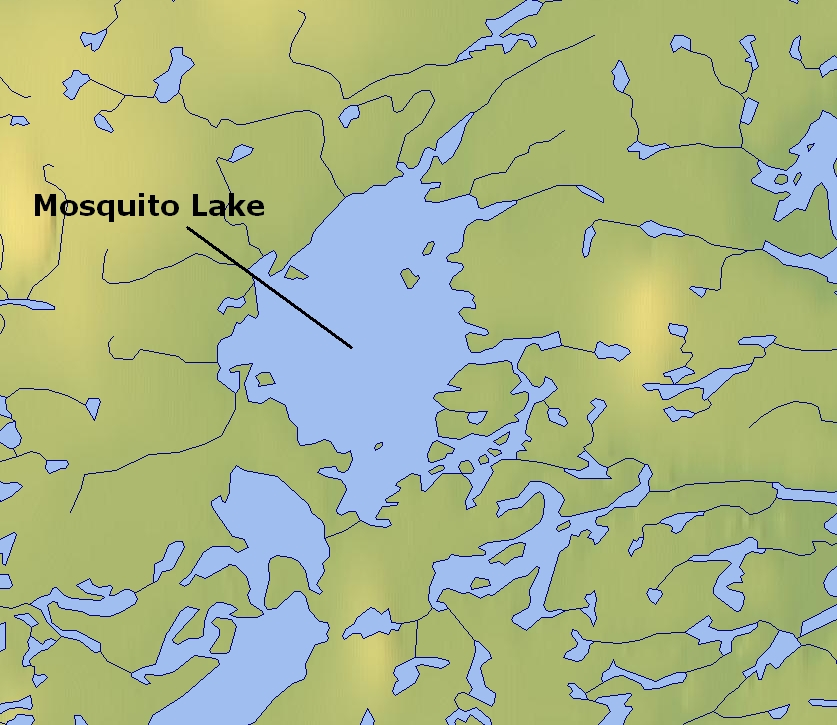
Map

== See also ==
- List of lakes in the Northwest Territories
