= Four corners (Canada) =

Quadripoint in Canada, between Manitoba, Saskatchewan, Northwest Territories and Nunavut

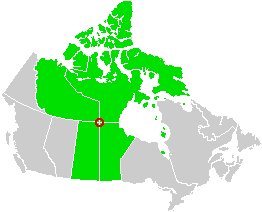
Map highlighting the corners of the four Canadian provinces and territories which meet.

Map showing all survey monuments within 6 km of the four corners

Map showing all survey monuments within 600 m of the four corners

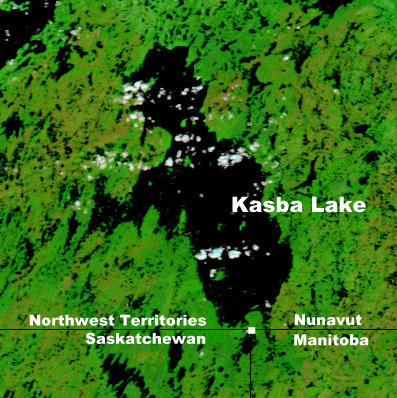
NASA photo showing Kasba Lake and the four corners

The four corners (French: Quatre coins) is a quadripoint near 60°N 102°W where four Canadian provinces or territories meet. Clockwise from southeast, they are the provinces of Manitoba and Saskatchewan and the territories of the Northwest Territories and Nunavut. The quadripoint came into being with the creation of Nunavut on April 1, 1999.

== Geography ==
The four corners area is located between Kasba Lake to the north and Hasbala Lake to the south. It is located by an area of marginal taiga forest, which happens to be the only place in Nunavut which is not Arctic tundra or ice cap. It is hundreds of kilometres from any road or railway but can be accessed from nearby Kasba Lake Airport or Kasba Lake Water Aerodrome as well as from Points North Landing near Wollaston Lake.

During the winter of 1961–1962 (37 years before the formation of Nunavut), a survey crew led by Lionel E. Boutiler installed 85 survey monuments along the northernmost section of the Saskatchewan–Manitoba border. The crew worked from south to north along the Second Meridian (102° west of the Greenwich Meridian) as defined in the system of Dominion Land Surveys. The final monument, designated No. 157, officially marked the intersection of the boundaries of Manitoba, Saskatchewan and the Northwest Territories. Unlike the standard survey monuments along the provincial and territorial borders, Monument 157 is an aluminum obelisk that stands about 1 metre (3 feet 3 inches) tall. Photos can be seen in the original survey report. On the top of the monument is a cap that states "5 years imprisonment for removal".

The exact location of Monument 157 (measured with modern GPS technologies) is 59°59′57.9689″N 102°00′27.1758″W (NAD83). This places it roughly 421 m (1,381 ft) west of 102° W and roughly 63 m (207 ft) south of 60°N at an elevation of 347.9 m (1,141 ft).

The establishment of Nunavut in 1999 led to the creation of Canada's only quadripoint. In the legal definition of Nunavut, its border is specified as "Commencing at the intersection of 60°00′ N latitude with 102°00′ W longitude, being the intersection of the Manitoba, Northwest Territories and Saskatchewan borders". Since the intersection does not lie exactly at those coordinates, the laws left a legal ambiguity regarding the exact commencement point of the boundary.

In 2014, the Survey General Branch (SGB) of Natural Resources Canada acknowledged there was a problem with the legal boundary definition; it decided that the boundary should commence at Monument 157.

Specifically it decided that the first leg of the boundary should be a 472 km (293 mi) geodesic line running from Monument 157 to the first turning point at 64°14′N 102°00′W. This decision confirmed that in the eyes of Natural Resources Canada, the two territories and two provinces do indeed meet at a quadripoint.

In September 2014, the federal government paid for an official survey of the 472 km (293 mi) line. The survey crew, following instructions from the SGB, installed 48 new Canada Lands survey monuments along the geodesic line. As of 2021, the ambiguous legislation has not been repealed or updated to acknowledge the existence of the surveyed boundary, but based on legal precedent from the Dominion Land Survey, the surveyed boundary legally prevails over the description of the boundary in the original legislation.

== Climate ==
The climate of the area belongs to the subarctic climate category (Köppen Dfc). The short summers are just warm enough to permit the growth of trees and to avoid permafrost, which is otherwise predominant throughout Nunavut and the Northwest Territories. The taiga covers the area with coniferous trees.

== Gallery ==
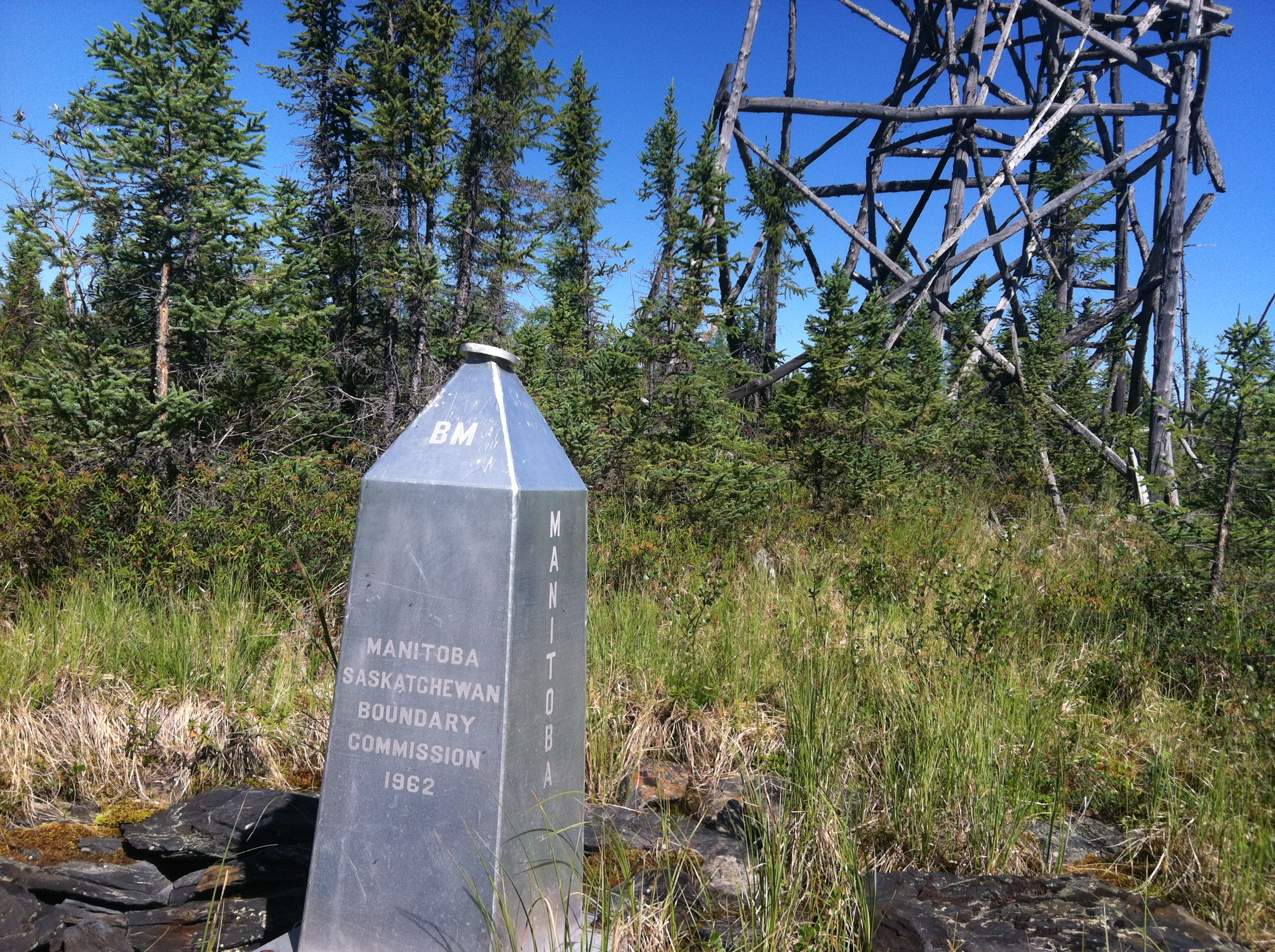
The obelisk as seen from the Manitoba (southeast) side, with a survey tower in the territories

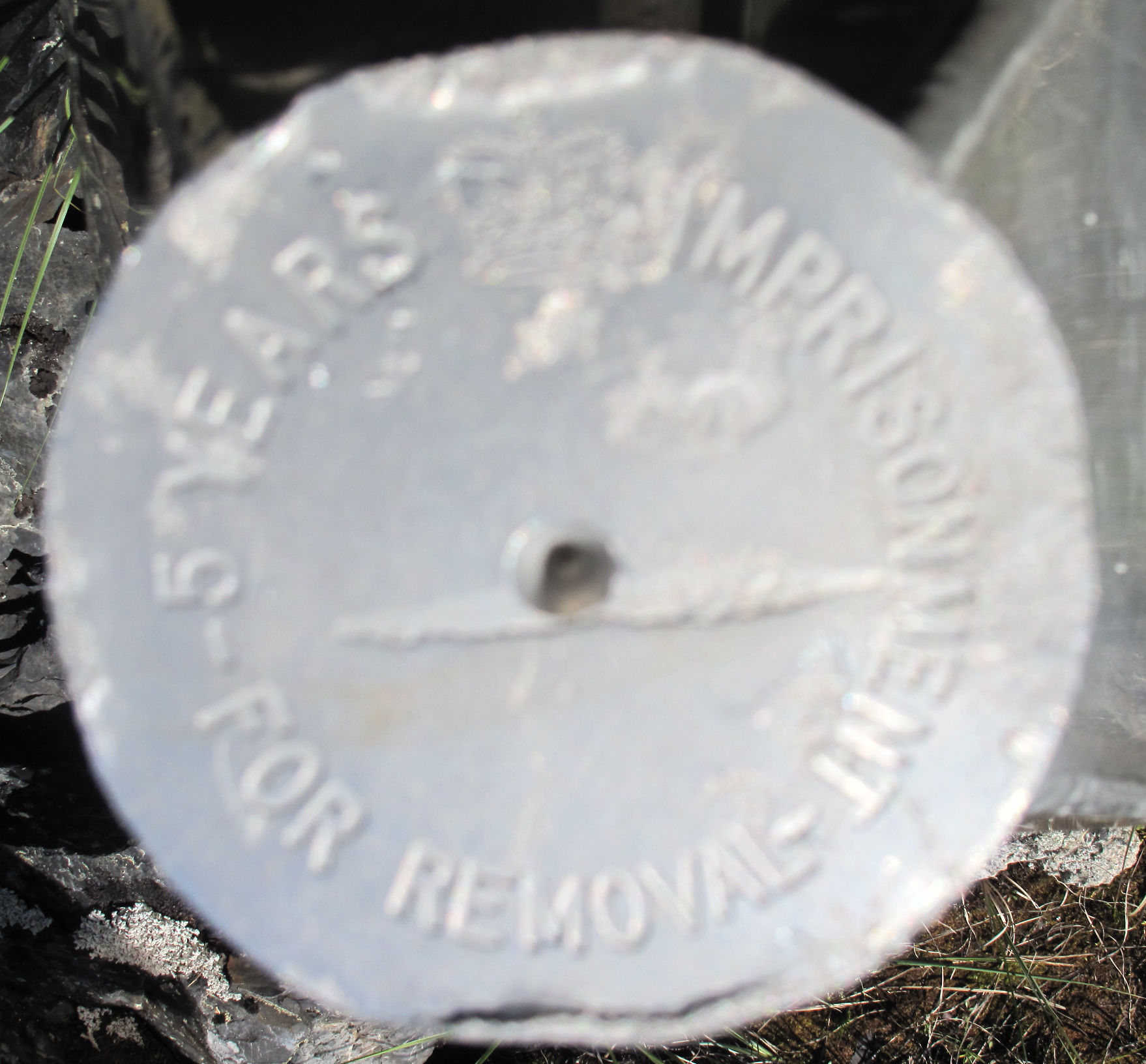
The disk on top of the obelisk

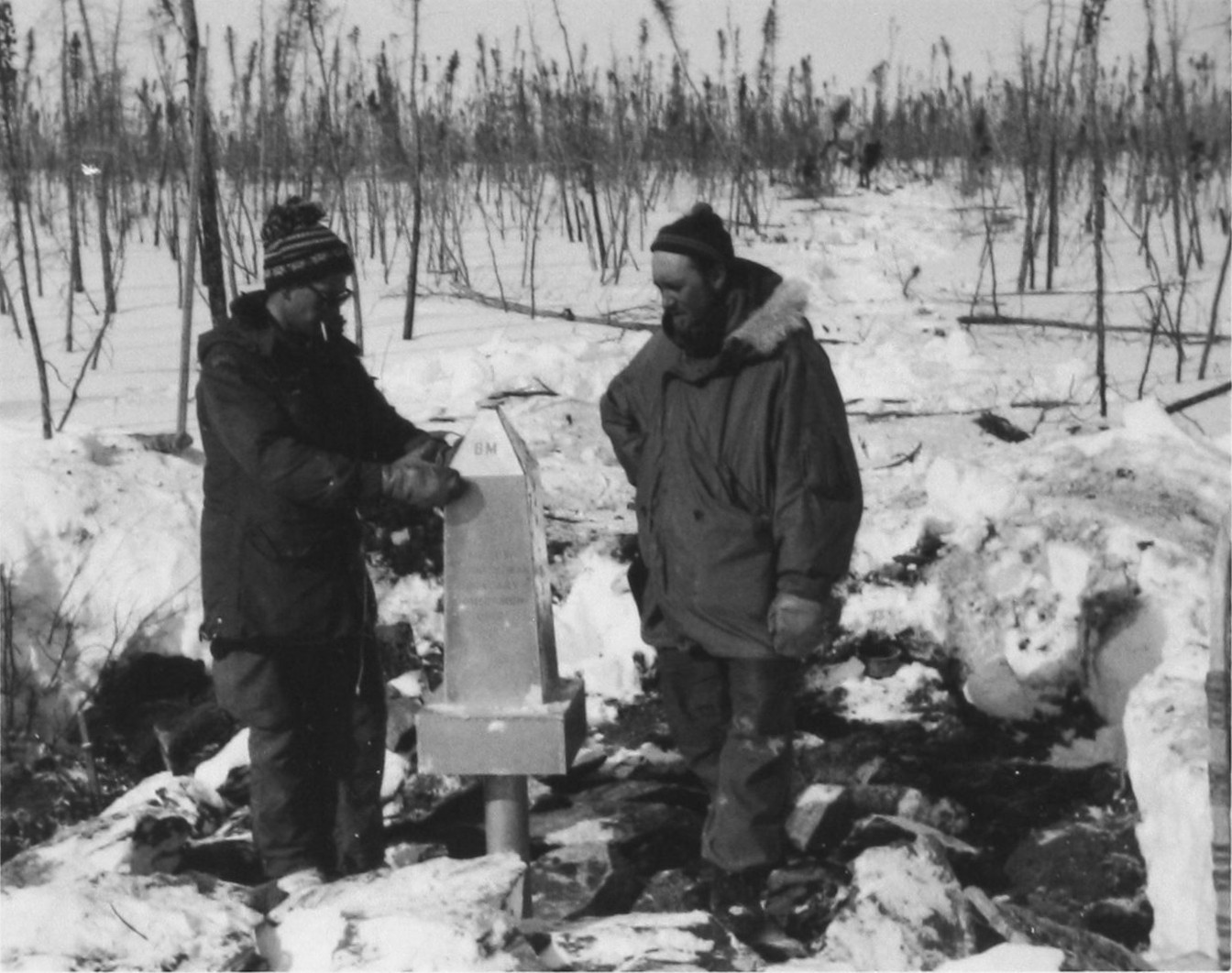
Installation of obelisk on April 6, 1962

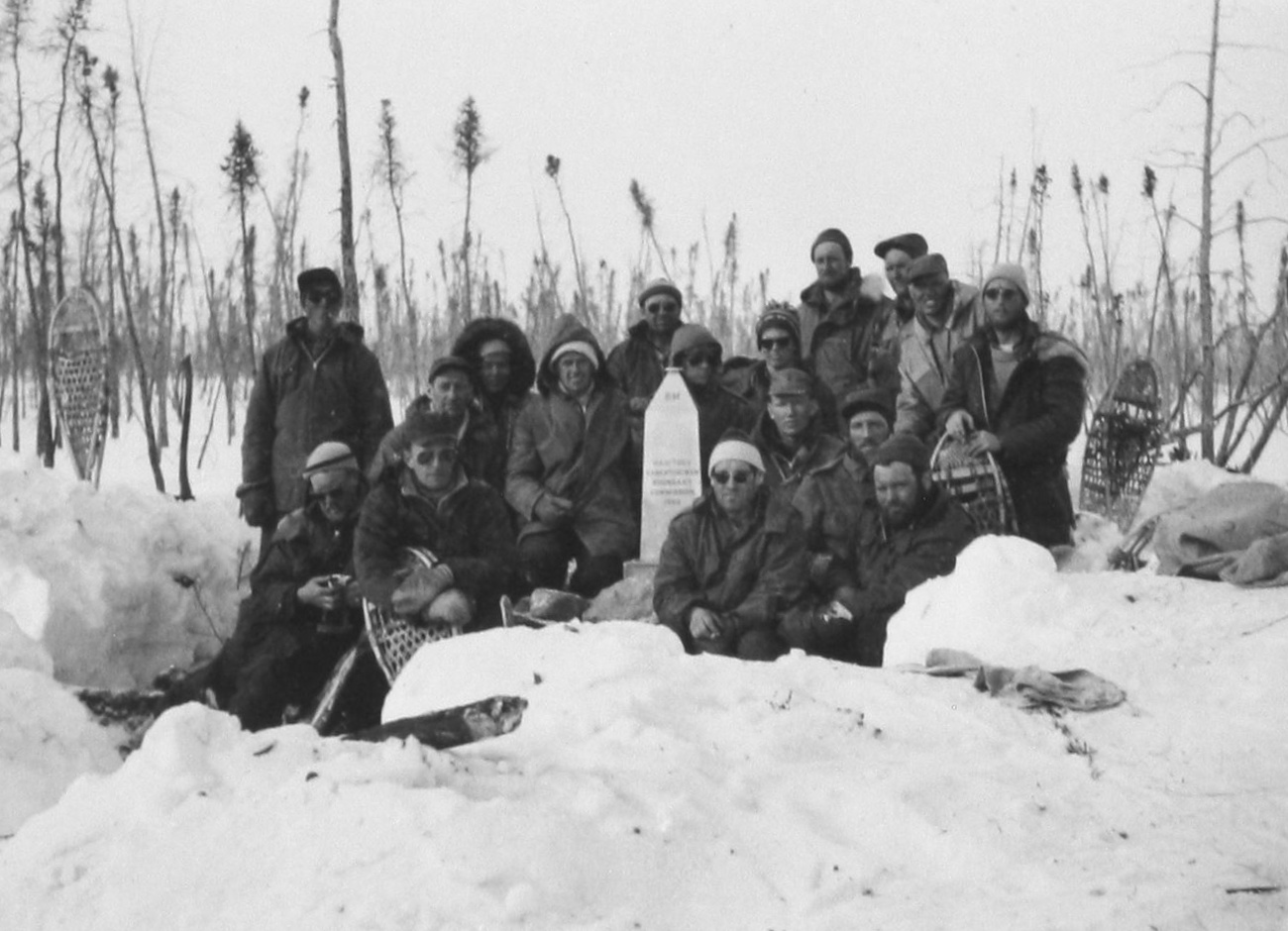
Survey crew after the installation of obelisk on April 6, 1962

== See also ==
- Geography of Canada
- List of regions of Canada
- Four Corners Monument, a surveyed quadripoint in the United States which also has a monument.
