= Buffalo Lake (Northwest Territories) =

Lake in the Northwest Territories, Canada

- Location within Northwest Territories

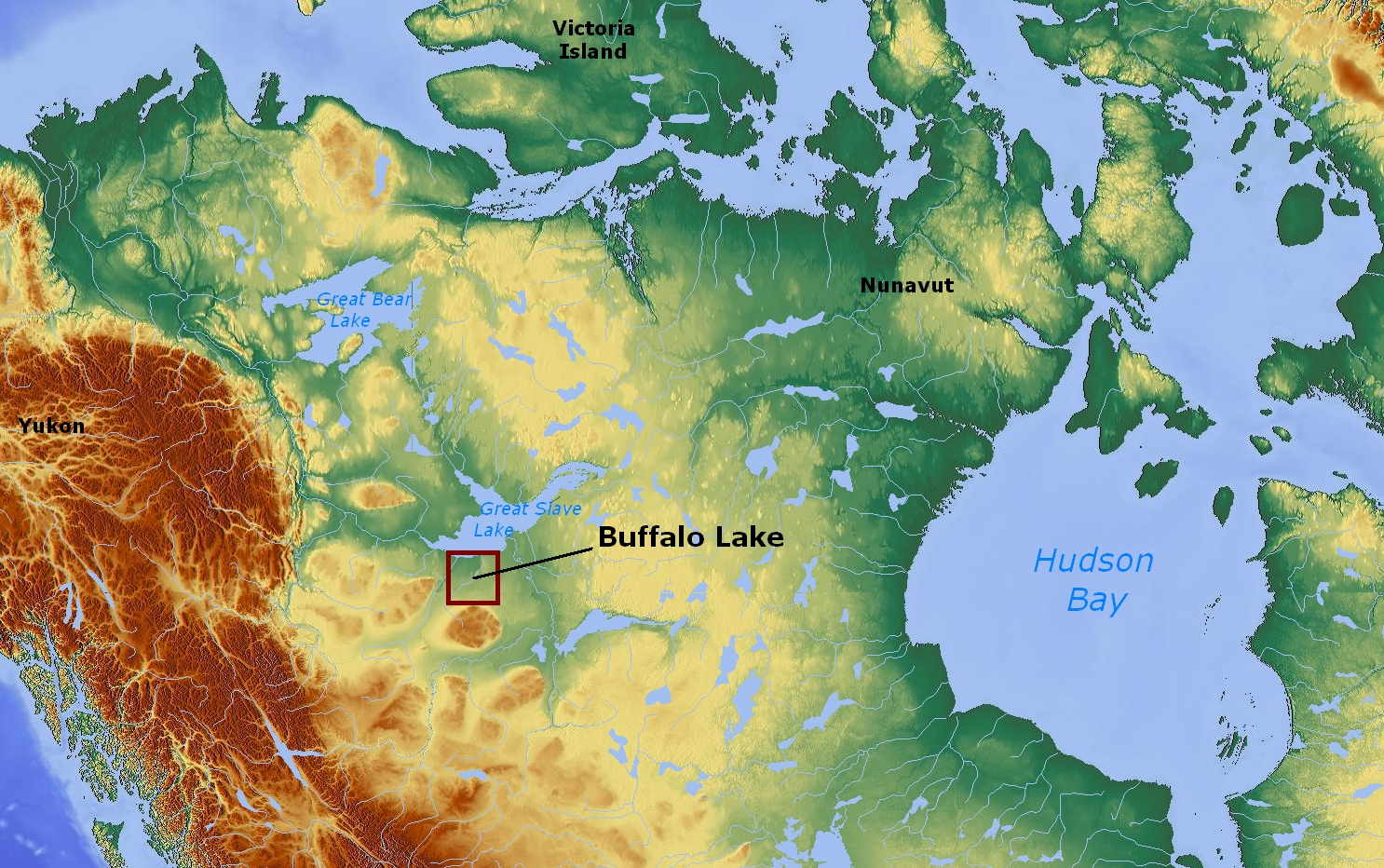
- Location: Northwest Territories
- Coordinates: 60°14′N 115°26′W
- Basin countries: Canada
- Surface area: 611 km^{2} (236 sq mi)
- Surface elevation: 265 m (869 ft)

Buffalo Lake is a lake in the Northwest Territories, Canada.

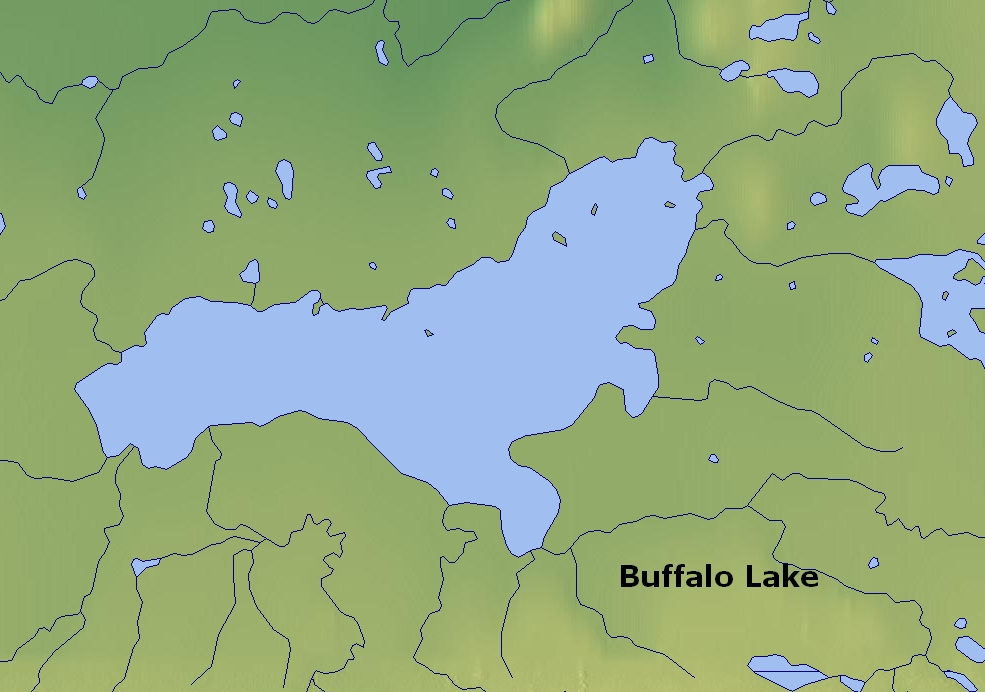
Map

== See also ==
- List of lakes in the Northwest Territories
