= MacKay Lake (Northwest Territories) =

Lake in the Northwest Territories, Canada

- Location within Northwest Territories

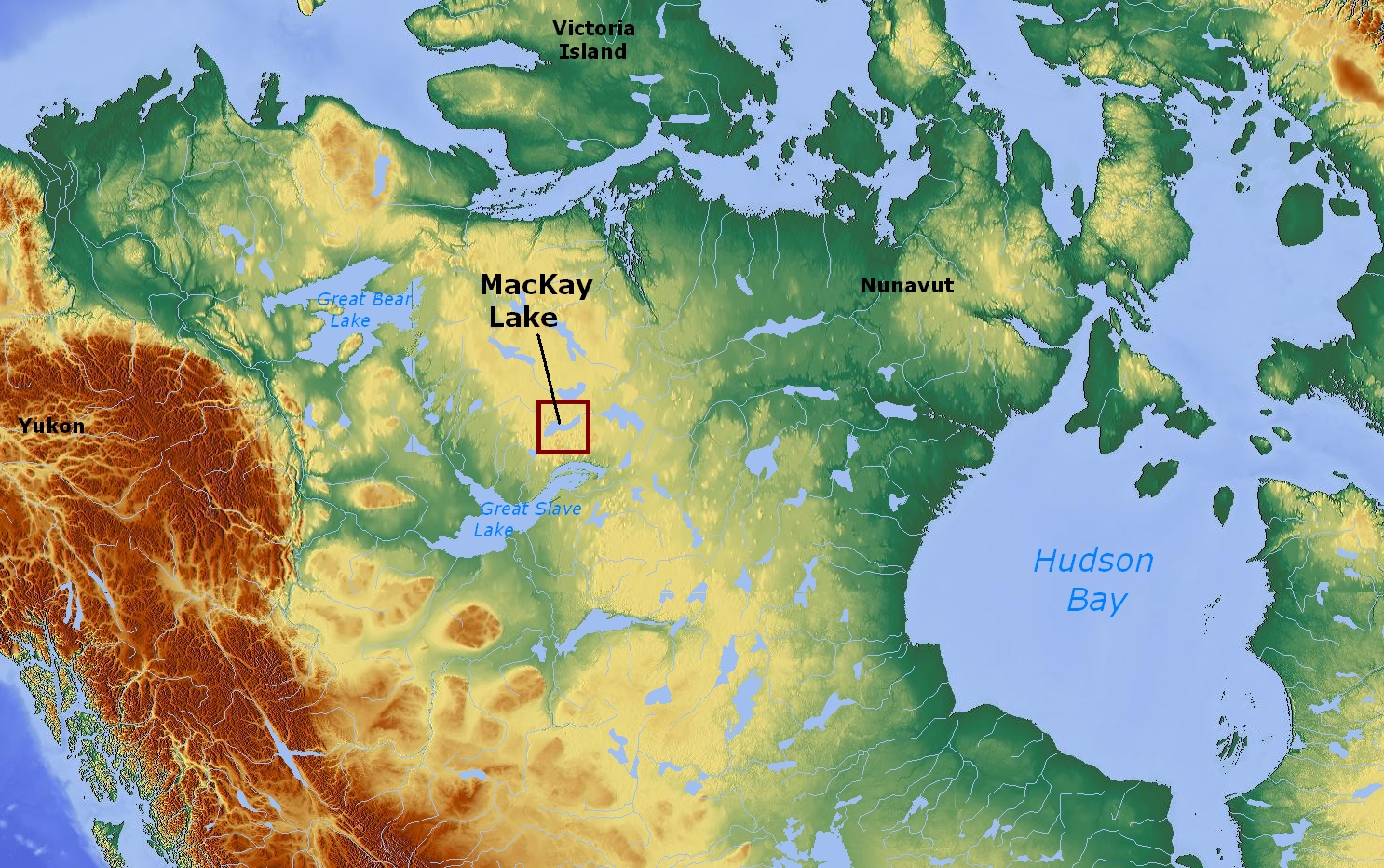
- Location: Northwest Territories
- Coordinates: 63°55′N 111°02′W
- Basin countries: Canada
- Surface area: 1,061 km^{2} (410 sq mi)
- Surface elevation: 431 m (1,414 ft)

MacKay Lake is the fifth largest lake in the Northwest Territories, Canada.

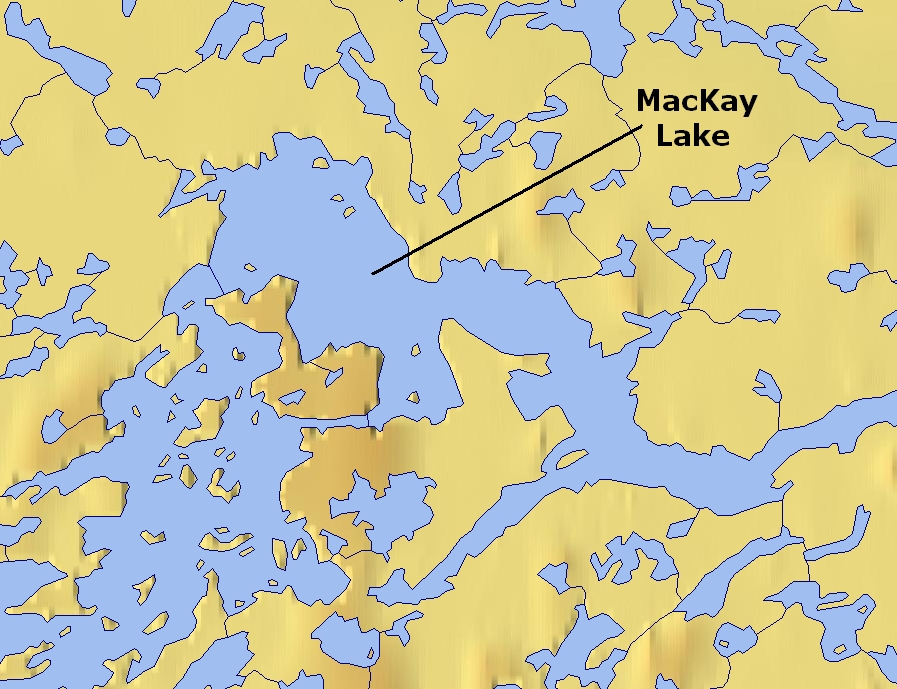
Map

== See also ==
- List of lakes of the Northwest Territories
