= Man Drowned Himself Lake =

Lake in Northwest Territories, Canada

- Location within Northwest Territories
- Location: Region 2, Northwest Territories, Canada
- Coordinates: 65°41′35.6″N 123°12′51.4″W
- Basin countries: Canada
- Surface area: 6.41 km^{2} (2.47 mi^{2})
- Surface elevation: 277 m (909 ft)

Man Drowned Himself Lake is a long and narrow lake in the boreal forest of Canada, on the large western peninsula of Saoyú (or Sahoyue, or Grizzly Bear Mountain) in Great Bear Lake in the Sahtu Region (and census Region 2) of the Northwest Territories of Canada.

The nearest settlement is the village of Délı̨nę, about 30 miles (48 km) south. The lake is almost entirely surrounded by marshes and swamps, and there are no buildings, habitations, or other improvements in the area. The average temperature is −8 °C. The warmest month is July, at 15 °C, and the coldest is February, at −24 °C.

The lake is named for two brothers who drowned attempting to cross the lake. According to Délı̨nę resident Morris Neylle, who heard the story from an elder, the origin of the name is very old. Neylle told Northwest Territories News/North in 2017, "What I heard was, there were two brothers that had went across that lake even though their boat wasn't in good condition. It was a birch bark canoe. They were cursed with medicine power. On their way back, even though they really didn't have to cross the lake, they crossed it and that's where [the boat] collapsed on them and they both drowned."
