= Tathlina Lake =

Lake in Northwest Territories, Canada

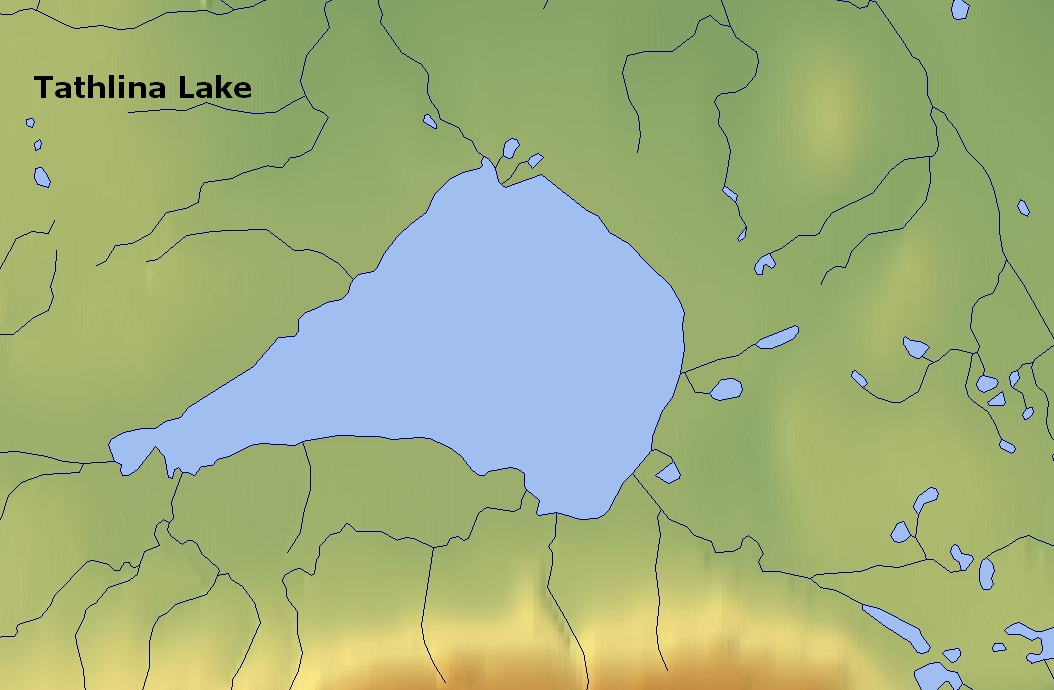
- Map

- Location within Northwest Territories

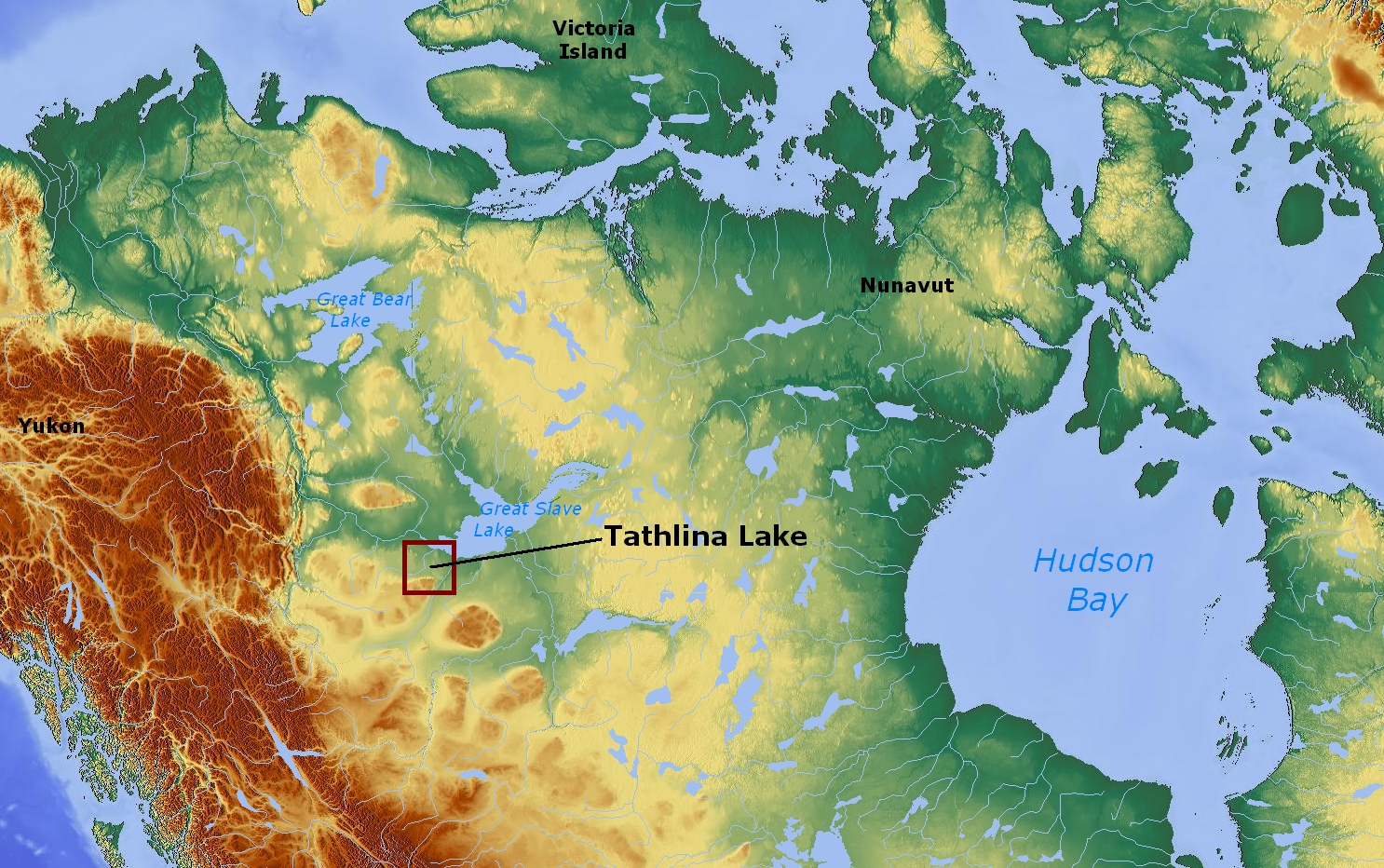
- Location: Northwest Territories
- Coordinates: 60°33′N 117°32′W
- Primary inflows: Kakisa River
- Basin countries: Canada
- Surface area: 573.4 km^{2} (221.4 sq mi)
- Average depth: 1 m (3.3 ft)
- Surface elevation: 280 m (920 ft)

Tathlina Lake is a large, shallow lake, located in the Northwest Territories, Canada. An outcropping of the Kakisa Formation occurs along the side of this lake.

This turbid lake, the 15th largest in the Northwest Territories, is located at an elevation of 269 metres, and has an average depth of only 1 metre. Due to this shallow depth, it is considered vulnerable to changes in such variables as water level and temperature, ice thickness, and dissolved oxygen levels. It has also been subject to fish kills.

Commercial fishing for walleye (Sander vitreus) commenced in 1953. However, during the 1960s to 1990s it experienced poor harvests. It has been closed to commercial fishing since 2000.

== See also ==
- List of lakes in the Northwest Territories
