= Clinton-Colden Lake =

Lake in the Northwest Territories, Canada

- Location within Northwest Territories

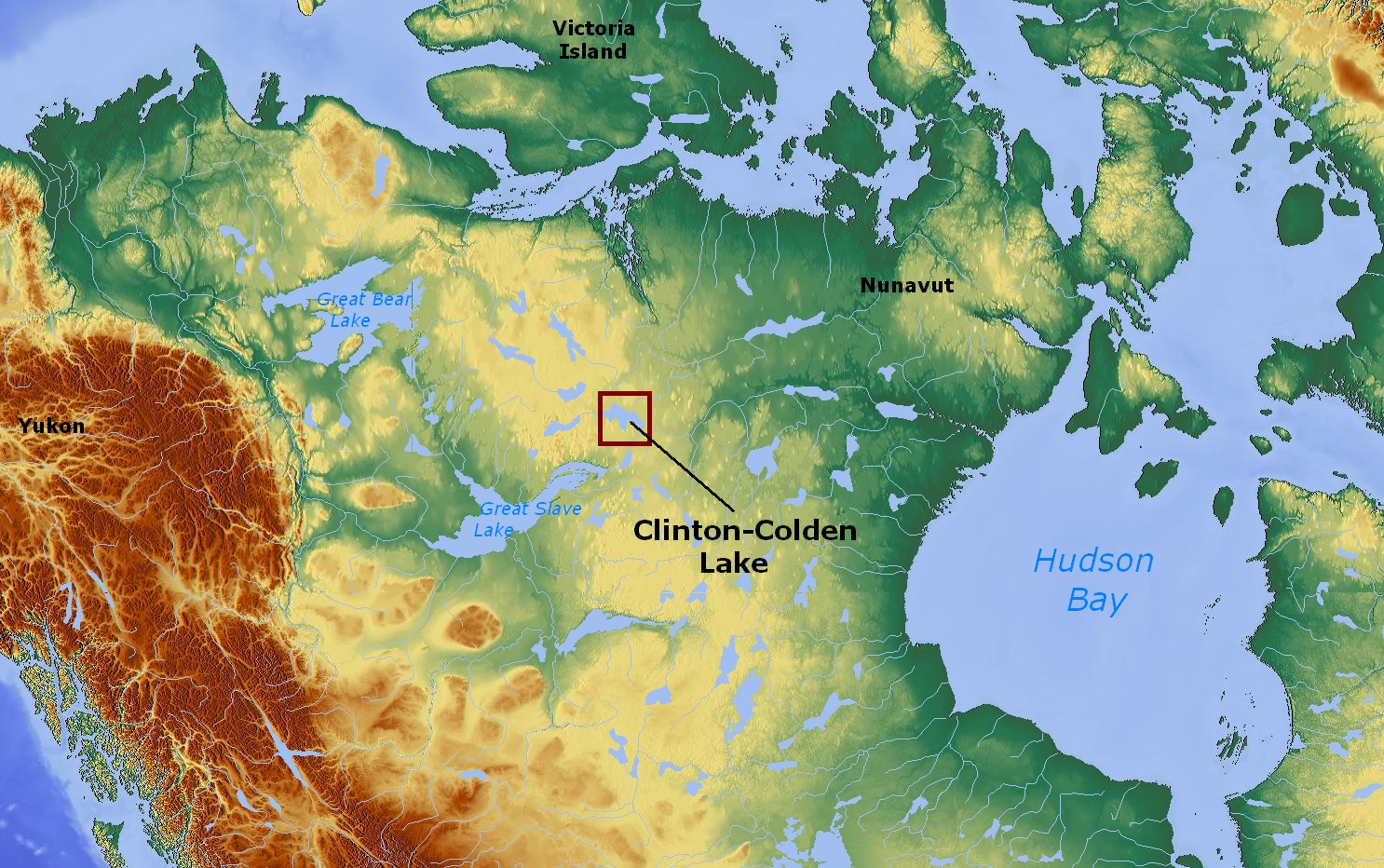
- Location: Northwest Territories
- Coordinates: 63°58′N 107°28′W
- Basin countries: Canada
- Surface area: 737 km^{2} (285 sq mi)
- Surface elevation: 375 m (1,230 ft)

Clinton-Colden Lake is the ninth largest lake in the Northwest Territories, Canada. It is about 90 miles north of the eastern tip of the Great Slave Lake. George Back reached it in 1834.

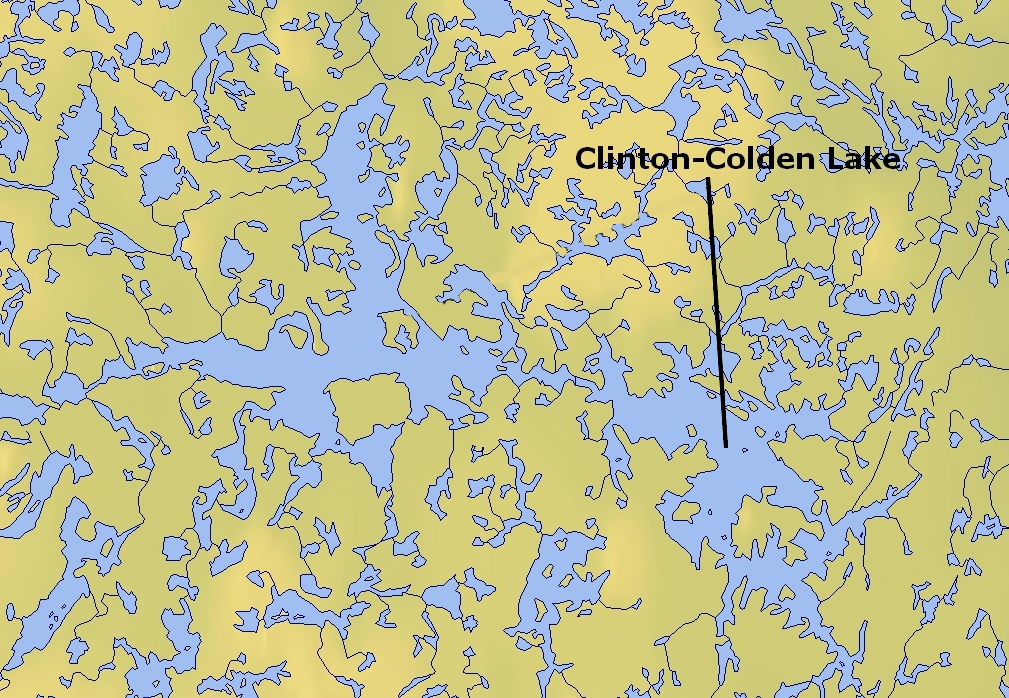
Map

== See also ==
- List of lakes of the Northwest Territories
