= Basler Lake =

- Location within Canada
- Location: Northwest Territories, Canada
- Coordinates: 63°55′29.5″N 116°00′23.0″W
- Type: lake

Basler Lake is a large lake in the Northwest Territories, Canada. It is located 175 kilometres (109 mi) northwest of Yellowknife.
