= Wholdaia Lake =

Lake in the Northwest Territories, Canada

- Location within Northwest Territories

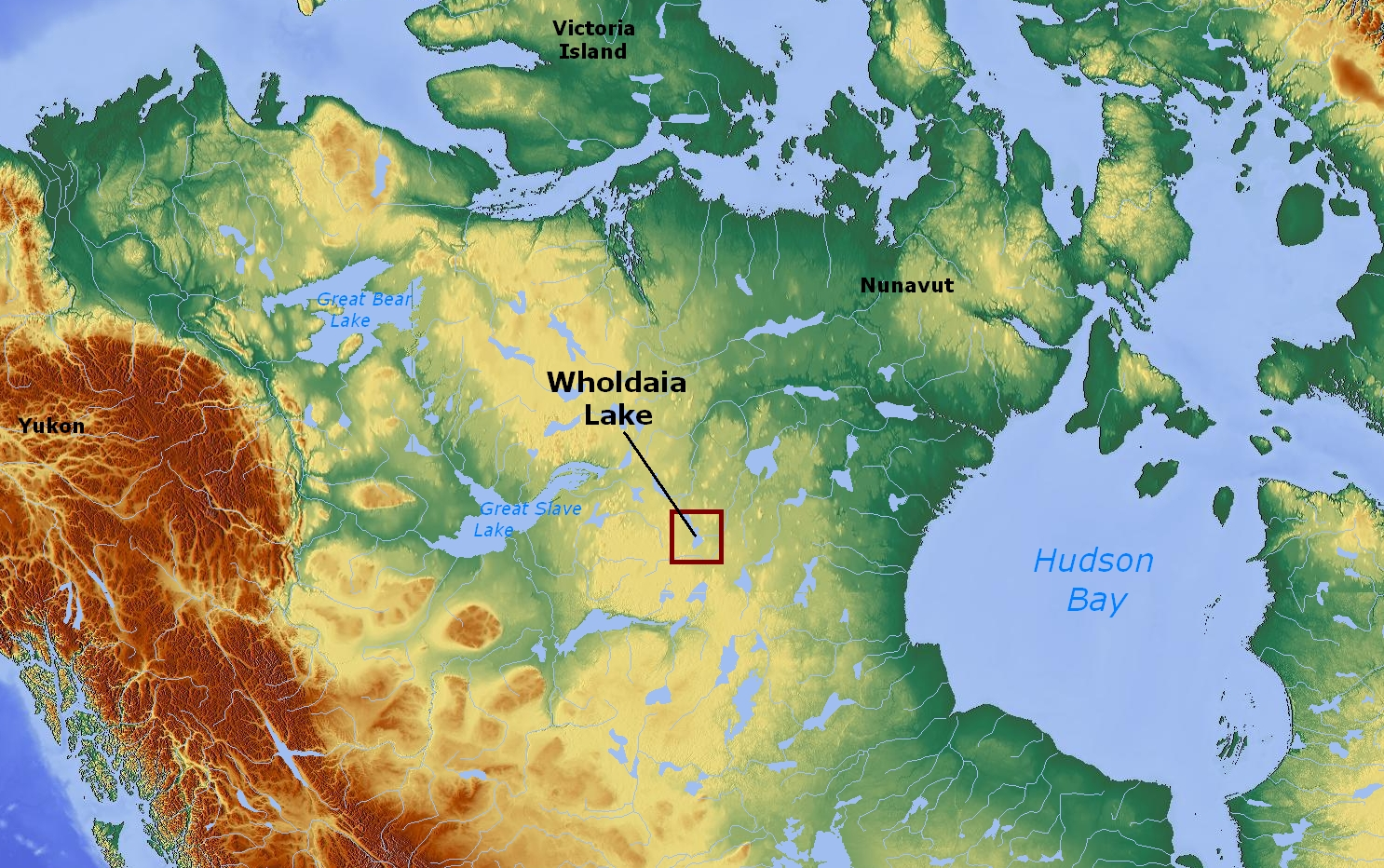
- Location: Northwest Territories
- Coordinates: 60°40′N 104°16′W
- Basin countries: Canada
- Surface area: 678 km^{2} (262 sq mi)
- Surface elevation: 364 m (1,194 ft)

Wholdaia Lake is a lake in the Northwest Territories, Canada. It is drained northward by the Dubawnt River.

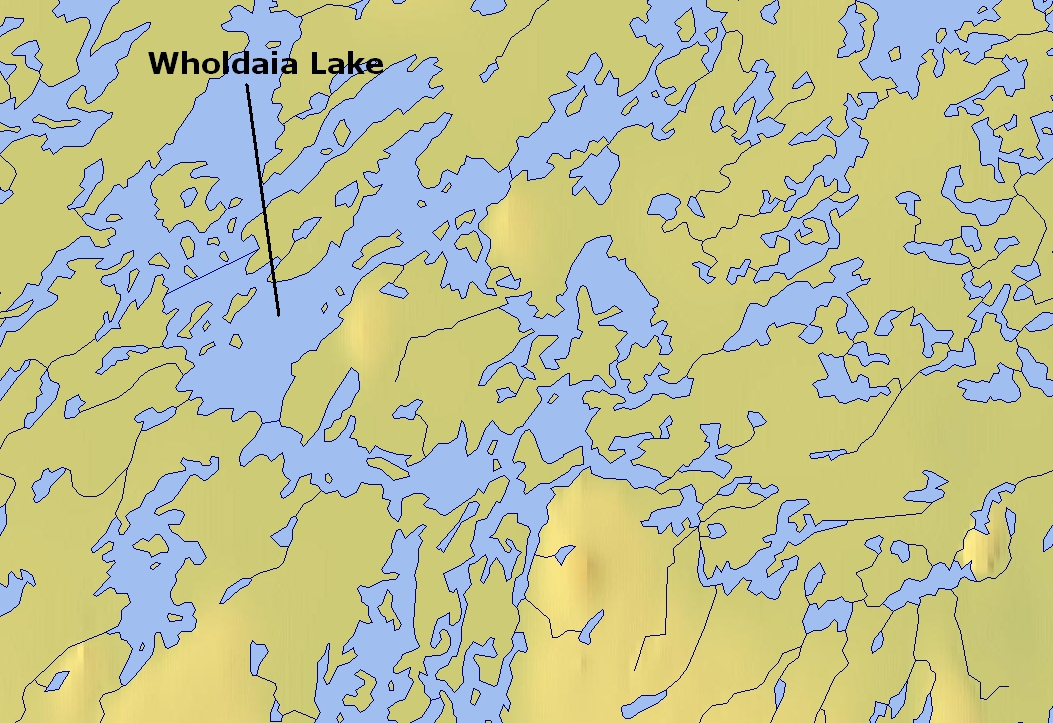
Map

== See also ==
- List of lakes in the Northwest Territories
