= Faber Lake =

Lake in the Northwest Territories, Canada

- Faber Lake in the Northwest Territories, Canada. Faber Lake (Canada)

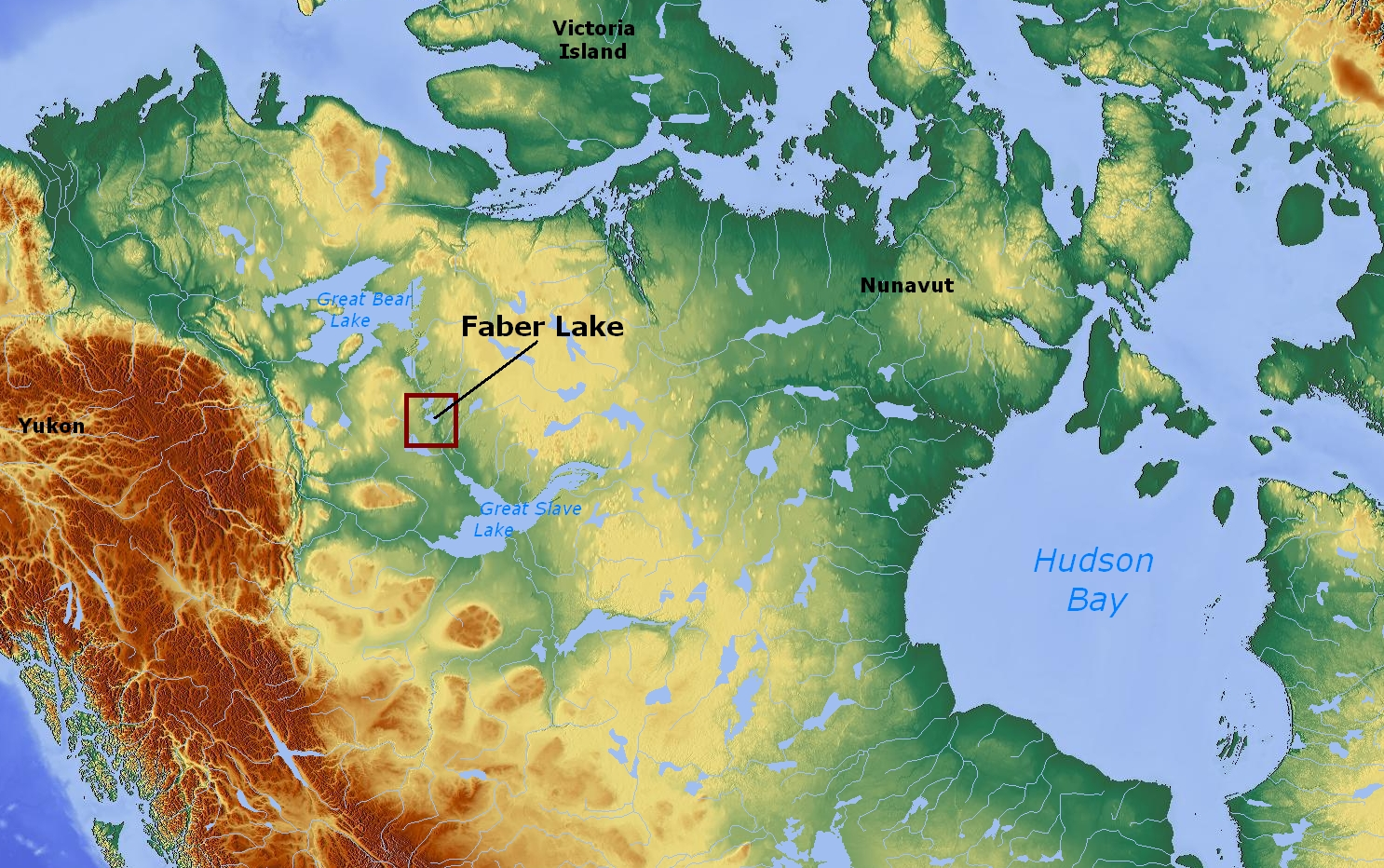
- Location: Northwest Territories
- Coordinates: 63°53′N 117°28′W
- Basin countries: Canada
- Surface area: 439 km^{2} (169 sq mi)
- Max. depth: 213 m (699 ft)

Faber Lake is a lake in the Northwest Territories, Canada.

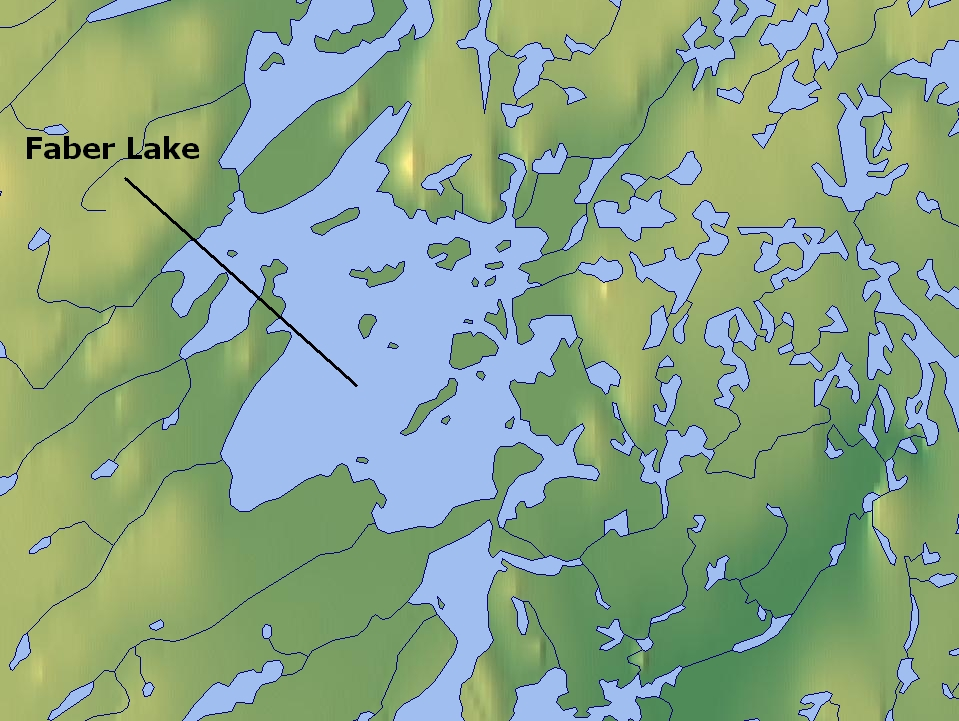
Map

== See also ==
- List of lakes in the Northwest Territories
