= Snowbird Lake =

Lake in the Northwest Territories, Canada

- Location within Northwest Territories

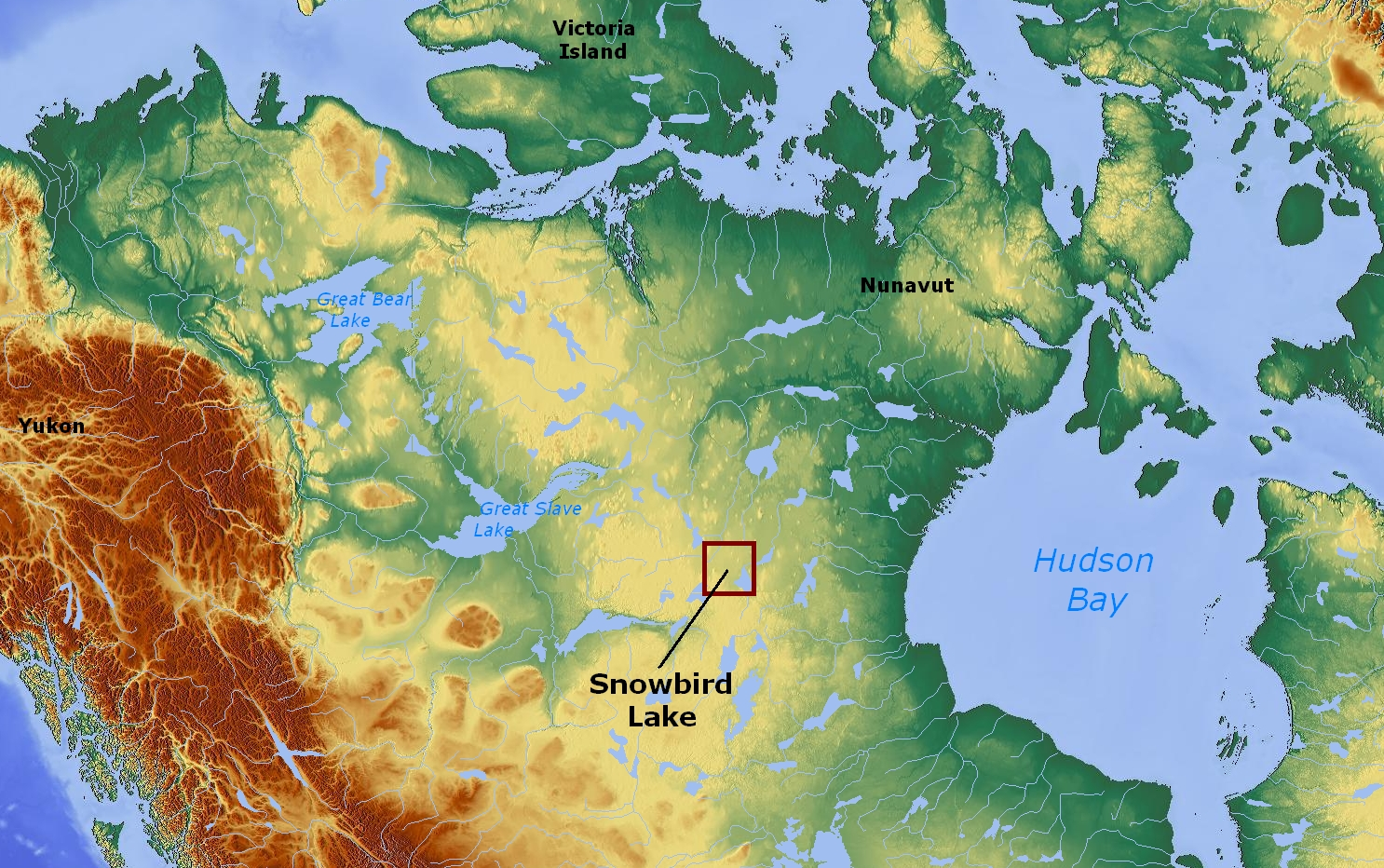
- Location: Northwest Territories
- Coordinates: 60°40′N 103°00′W
- Basin countries: Canada
- Surface area: 505 km^{2} (195 sq mi)
- Surface elevation: 359 m (1,178 ft)

Snowbird Lake is a lake in the Northwest Territories, Canada.

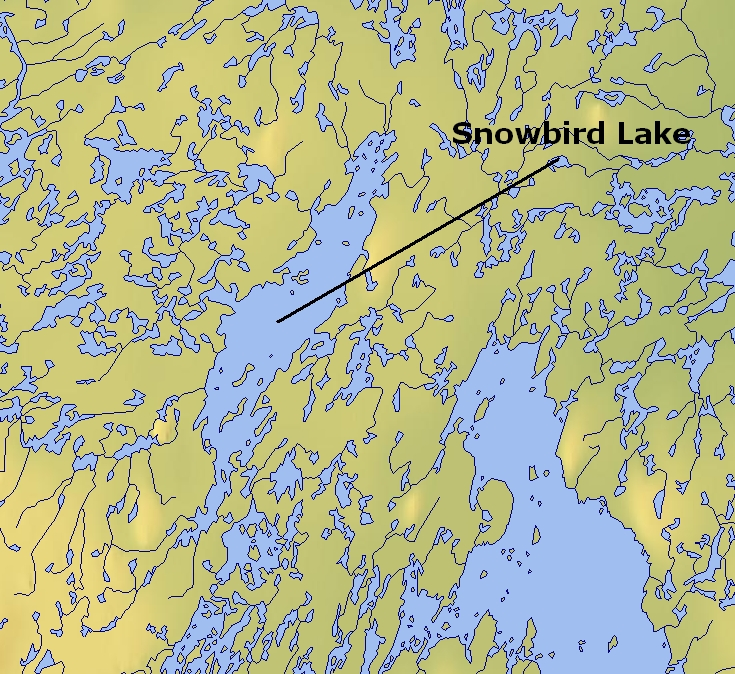
Map

== See also ==
- List of lakes in the Northwest Territories
