= Selwyn Lake =

Lake in northern Canada

- Location in the Northwest Territories Selwyn Lake (Canada)
- Location: Northwest Territories; Saskatchewan
- Coordinates: 60°00′N 104°30′W
- Primary outflows: Chipman River, Porcupine River
- Basin countries: Canada
- Surface area: 717 km^{2} (277 sq mi)
- Surface elevation: 398 m (1,306 ft)
- Settlements: None

Selwyn Lake is a lake that straddles the border between the Northwest Territories and Saskatchewan, Canada.

== See also ==
- List of lakes of the Northwest Territories
- List of lakes of Saskatchewan
