= List of lakes of Canada =

Map guide for lists of lakes of Canada

This is a partial list of lakes of Canada. According to Environment and Climate Change Canada (ECCC) the country has a larger number of lakes than any other country with the amount ranging between 880,000 lakes (measuring 10 hectares (0.10 square kilometres; 25 acres) and larger) and a total of 2,000,000 throughout Canada.

There are 563 lakes in Canada with an area larger than 100 square kilometres (39 square miles) and, excluding Hudson Bay, (Note: Although Hudson Bay is saltwater its level of salinity is less than that of the world's oceans) approximately 891,163 km^{2} (344,080 sq mi) of the country is covered in fresh water. The Atlas of Canada says that lakes cover 8.9 per cent of the country and that the Great Lakes, divided between Canada and the United States, account for 18 per cent of the world's fresh water.

Some web sites suggest that Canada has more lakes than the rest of the world combined. According to Snopes, however, this claim is false and ECCC says that the country has largest lake area.

== Canada's largest lakes ==
This is a list of lakes of Canada with an area larger than 1,000 km^{2} (390 sq mi).

Canadian lakes larger than 1,000 km^{2} (390 sq mi)
Rank	Name	Province / territory	Area (within Canada)		Elevation		Notes	References
			km2	sq mi	m	ft		
1	Lake Huron	Ontario	36,000	14,000	177	581	Huron has a total area of 59,600 km^{2} (23,000 sq mi) with 23,600 km^{2} (9,100 sq mi) in the United States	
2	Great Bear Lake	Northwest Territories	31,328	12,096	156	512	Largest lake entirely in Canada	
3	Lake Superior	Ontario	28,700	11,100	184	604	Superior has a total area of 82,100 km^{2} (31,700 sq mi) with 53,400 km^{2} (20,600 sq mi) in the United States	
4	Great Slave Lake	Northwest Territories	28,568	11,030	156	512		
5	Lake Winnipeg	Manitoba	24,387	9,416	217	712		
6	Lake Erie	Ontario	12,800	4,900	174	571	Erie has a total area of 25,700 km^{2} (9,900 sq mi) with 12,900 km^{2} (5,000 sq mi) in the United States	
7	Lake Ontario	Ontario	10,000	3,900	75	246	Ontario has a total area of 18,960 km^{2} (7,320 sq mi) with 8,960 km^{2} (3,460 sq mi) in the United States	
8	Lake Athabasca	Saskatchewan / Alberta	7,935	3,064	213	699		
9	Reindeer Lake	Saskatchewan / Manitoba	6,650	2,570	337	1,106		
10	Smallwood Reservoir	Newfoundland and Labrador	6,527	2,520	471	1,545		
11	Nettilling Lake	Nunavut	5,542	2,140	30	98	World's largest lake on an island	
12	Lake Winnipegosis	Manitoba	5,374	2,075	254	833		
13	Lake Nipigon	Ontario	4,848	1,872	260	850		
14	Lake Manitoba	Manitoba	4,624	1,785	248	814		
15	Caniapiscau Reservoir	Quebec	4,359	1,683	535	1,755		
16	Dubawnt Lake	Nunavut / Northwest Territories	3,833	1,480	236	774		
17	Lake of the Woods	Ontario / Manitoba	3,150	1,220	323	1,060	Has a total area of 4,350 km^{2} (1,680 sq mi) of which 1,200 km^{2} (460 sq mi) is in the United States	
18	Amadjuak Lake	Nunavut	3,115	1,203	113	371		
19	Lake Melville	Newfoundland and Labrador	3,069	1,185			Tidal lake	
20	Robert-Bourassa Reservoir	Quebec	2,905	1,122	164	538		
21	Wollaston Lake	Saskatchewan	2,681	1,035	398	1,306	Bifurcation lake	
22	La Grande 3 Reservoir	Quebec	2,536	979			La Grande-3 generating station	
23	Lake Mistassini	Quebec	2,335	902	372	1,220	Largest natural lake in Quebec	
24	Nueltin Lake	Nunavut / Manitoba	2,279	880	278	912		
25	Southern Indian Lake	Manitoba	2,247	868	254	833		
26	Manicouagan Reservoir	Quebec	1,973	762				
27	Baker Lake	Nunavut	1,887	729	2	6 ft 7 in		
28	Lac La Martre	Northwest Territories	1,776	686	265	869		
29	Williston Lake	British Columbia	1,761	680	671	2,201		
30	Lac Seul	Ontario	1,657	640	357	1,171		
31	Gouin Reservoir	Quebec	1,570	610	404	1,325		
32	Yathkyed Lake	Nunavut	1,449	559	140	460	Contains the only island in a lake on an island in a lake on an island in a lake on Earth, also known as a fifth-order island.	
33	Lake Claire	Alberta	1,436	554	213	699		
34	Cree Lake	Saskatchewan	1,434	554	487	1,598		
35	Lac la Ronge	Saskatchewan	1,413	546	364	1,194		
36	Clearwater Lakes	Quebec	1,383	534	241	791	Formerly Lac à l'Eau Claire	
37	Cedar Lake	Manitoba	1,353	522	253	830		
38	Kasba Lake	Northwest Territories / Nunavut	1,341	518	336	1,102		
39	Lake Bienville	Quebec	1,249	482	426	1,398		
40	Laforge-1 Reservoir	Quebec	1,240	480			Laforge-1 generating station	
41	Island Lake	Manitoba	1,223	472	227	745		
42	Lesser Slave Lake	Alberta	1,168	451	577	1,893		
43	Gods Lake	Manitoba	1,151	444	178	584		
44	Aberdeen Lake	Nunavut	1,100	420	80	260		
45	Bras d'Or Lake	Nova Scotia	1,099	424			Tidal lake	
46	Napaktulik Lake	Nunavut	1,080	420	381	1,250		
47	MacKay Lake	Northwest Territories	1,061	410	431	1,414		
48	Opinaca Reservoir	Quebec	1,040	400				
49	Lac Saint-Jean	Quebec	1,003	387	98	322		

== Lakes by province and territory ==
This is a list of lakes in Canada with an area of 400 km^{2} (150 sq mi) or larger. The lakes are listed alphabetically by province and territory.

=== Alberta ===
Alberta lakes 400 km^{2} (150 sq mi) or larger
Rank	Name	Area		Elevation		Notes	References
		km2	sq mi	m	ft		
1	Lake Claire	1,436	554	213	699		
2	Lesser Slave Lake	1,168	451	577	1,893		
3	Bistcho Lake	426	164	552	1,811		

=== British Columbia ===
British Columbia lakes 400 km^{2} (150 sq mi) or larger
Rank	Name	Area		Elevation		Notes	References
		km2	sq mi	m	ft		
1	Williston Lake	1,761	680	671	2,201		
2	Atlin Lake	775	299	668	2,192	Partly in Yukon	
3	Babine Lake	495	191	711	2,333		
4	Kootenay Lake	407	157	532	1,745		
5	Ootsa Lake	404	156	853	2,799	Nechako Reservoir comprises six lakes, Tahtsa, Ootsa (the largest and its name is sometimes used for the reservoir), Whitesail, Knewstubb, Natalkuz, and Tetachuck	

=== Manitoba ===
Manitoba lakes 400 km^{2} (150 sq mi) or larger
Rank	Name	Area		Elevation		Notes	References
		km2	sq mi	m	ft		
1	Lake Winnipeg	24,387	9,416	217	712		
2	Lake Winnipegosis	5,734	2,214	254	833		
3	Lake Manitoba	4,624	1,785	248	814		
4	Southern Indian Lake	2,247	868	254	833		
5	Cedar Lake	1,353	522	253	830		
6	Island Lake	1,223	472	227	745		
7	Gods Lake	1,151	444	178	584		
8	Cross Lake	755	292	207	679		
9	Playgreen Lake	657	254	217	712		
10	Dauphin Lake	519	200	260	850		
11	Granville Lake	490	190	258	846		
12	Sipiwesk Lake	454	175	183	600		
13	Oxford Lake	401	155	186	610		
14	Molson Lake	400	150	221	725		

=== New Brunswick ===
The largest lake in New Brunswick is Grand Lake with an area of 171 km^{2} (66 sq mi).

=== Newfoundland and Labrador ===
Newfoundland and Labrador lakes 400 km^{2} (150 sq mi) or larger
Rank	Name	Area		Elevation		Notes	References
		km2	sq mi	m	ft		
1	Smallwood Reservoir	6,527	2,520	471	1,545		
2	Lake Melville	3,069	1,185			Tidal lake	
3	Ashuanipi Lake	596	230	529	1,736		
4	Grand Lake	537	207	85	279		
5	Lac Joseph	451	174	512	1,680		
6	Atikonak Lake	431	166	518	1,699		

=== Northwest Territories ===
Northwest Territories lakes 400 km^{2} (150 sq mi) or larger
Rank	Name	Area		Elevation		Notes	References
		km2	sq mi	m	ft		
1	Great Bear Lake	31,328	12,096	156	512	Largest lake entirely in Canada	
2	Great Slave Lake	31,328	12,096	156	512		
3	Lac La Martre	1,776	686	265	869		
4	Kasba Lake	1,341	518	336	1,102	Partly in Nunavut	
5	MacKay Lake	1,061	410	431	1,414		
6	Hottah Lake	918	354	180	590		
7	Aylmer Lake	847	327	375	1,230		
8	Nonacho Lake	784	303	354	1,161		
9	Clinton-Colden Lake	737	285	375	1,230		
10	Selwyn Lake	717	277	398	1,306	Partly in Saskatchewan	
11	Point Lake	701	271	175	574		
12	Wholdaia Lake	678	262	364	1,194		
13	Lac de Gras	633	244	396	1,299		
14	Buffalo Lake	612	236	265	869		
15	Tathlina Lake	573	221	280	920		
16	Artillery Lake	551	213	364	1,194		
17	Snowbird Lake	505	195	359	1,178		
18	Sambaa K'e	504	195	503	1,650	Formerly known as Trout Lake	
19	Lac des Bois	469	181	297	974		
20	Colville Lake	455	176	245	804		
21	Faber Lake	439	169	213	699		

=== Nova Scotia ===
Bras d'Or Lake is the largest lake in Nova Scotia, a tidal lake, with an area of 1,099 km^{2} (424 sq mi).

=== Nunavut ===
Nunavut lakes 400 km^{2} (150 sq mi) or larger
Rank	Name	Area		Elevation		Notes	References
		km2	sq mi	m	ft		
1	Nettilling Lake	5,542	2,140	30	98	World's largest lake on an island	
2	Dubawnt Lake	3,833	1,480	236	774	Partly in the Northwest Territories	
3	Amadjuak Lake	3,115	1,203	113	371		
4	Nueltin Lake	2,279	880	278	912	Partly in Manitoba	
5	Baker Lake	1,887	729	2	6 ft 7 in		
6	Yathkyed Lake	1,449	559	140	460	Contains the only island in a lake on an island in a lake on an island in a lake on Earth, also known as a fifth-order island.	
7	Aberdeen Lake	1,100	420	80	260		
8	Napaktulik Lake	1,080	420	381	1,250		
9	Garry Lake	976	377	148	486		
10	Contwoyto Lake	957	369	564	1,850		
11	Ennadai Lake	681	263	311	1,020		
12	Tulemalu Lake	668	258	279	915		
13	Kamilukuak Lake	638	246	266	873	Partly in the Northwest Territories	
14	Kaminak Lake	600	230	53	174		
15	Tahiryuaq	588	227	11	36	Formerly known as Ferguson Lake	
16	Tebesjuak Lake	575	222	146	479		
17	Qamanirjuaq Lake	549	212	92	302		
18	Lake Hazen	542	209	158	518		
19	Princess Mary Lake	524	202	116	381		
20	South Henik Lake	513	198	184	604		
21	Angikuni Lake	510	200	257	843		
22	Hall Lake	491	190	6	20		
23	Tehek Lake	481	186	133	436		
24	Mallery Lake	479	185	158	518		
25	MacAlpine Lake	447	173	176	577		
26	Bluenose Lake	401	155	557	1,827		

=== Ontario ===
Ontario lakes 400 km^{2} (150 sq mi) or larger
Rank	Name	Area (within Canada)		Elevation		Notes	References
		km2	sq mi	m	ft		
1	Lake Huron	36,000	14,000	177	581	Huron has a total area of 59,600 km^{2} (23,000 sq mi) with 23,600 km^{2} (9,100 sq mi) in the United States	
2	Lake Superior	28,700	11,100	184	604	Superior has a total area of 82,100 km^{2} (31,700 sq mi) with 53,400 km^{2} (20,600 sq mi) in the United States	
3	Lake Erie	12,800	4,900	174	571	Erie has a total area of 25,700 km^{2} (9,900 sq mi) with 12,900 km^{2} (5,000 sq mi) in the United States	
4	Lake Ontario	10,000	3,900	575	1,886	Ontario has a total area of 18,960 km^{2} (7,320 sq mi) with 8,960 km^{2} (3,460 sq mi) in the United States	
4	Lake Nipigon	4,848	1,872	260	850		
5	Lake of the Woods	3,150	1,220	323	1,060	Has a total area of 4,350 km2 (1,680 sq mi) of which 1,200 km2 (460 sq mi) is in the United States	
6	Lac Seul	1,657	640	357	1,171		
7	Lake St. Clair	1,114	430	175	574	Partly in the United States	
8	Rainy Lake	932	360	338	1,109	Partly in the United States	
9	Lake Abitibi	931	359	265	869	Partly in Quebec	
10	Lake Nipissing	832	321	196	643		
11	Lake Simcoe	744	287	219	719		
12	Big Trout Lake	661	255	213	699		
13	Sandy Lake	527	203	276	906		
14	Lake St. Joseph	493	190	371	1,217		
15	Trout Lake	413	159	394	1,293		

=== Prince Edward Island ===
The largest lake in Prince Edward Island is Graham Rogers Lake with an area of 1.87 km^{2} (0.72 sq mi).

=== Quebec ===
Quebec lakes 400 km^{2} (150 sq mi) or larger
Rank	Name	Area		Elevation		Notes	References
		km2	sq mi	m	ft		
1	Caniapiscau Reservoir	4,359	1,683	535	1,755		
2	Robert-Bourassa Reservoir	2,905	1,122	164	538		
3	La Grande 3 Reservoir	2,536	979			La Grande-3 generating station	
4	Lake Mistassini	2,335	902	372	1,220	Largest natural lake in Quebec	
5	Manicouagan Reservoir	1,973	762				
6	Gouin Reservoir	1,570	610	404	1,325		
7	Clearwater Lakes	1,383	534	241	791	Formerly Lac à l'Eau Claire	
8	Lake Bienville	1,249	482	426	1,398		
9	Laforge-1 Reservoir	1,240	480			Laforge-1 generating station	
10	Opinaca Reservoir	1,040	400				
11	Lac Saint-Jean	1,003	387	98	322		
12	Pipmuacan Reservoir	978	378	396	1,299		
13	La Grande-4 Reservoir	765	295			La Grande-4 generating station	
14	Lake Minto	761	294	168	551		
15	Lake Tasiujaq	712	275			Formerly Lac Guillaume-Delisle	
16	Cabonga Reservoir	677	261	361	1,184		
17	Outardes-4	640	250	33	108		
18	Eastmain Reservoir	603	233			Officially the Réservoir de la Paix des Braves	
19	Lac Sakami	592	229	195	640		
20	Lake Manouane	584	225	494	1,621		
21	Lacs des Loups Marins	576	222	262	860		
22	Lake Evans	547	211	232	761		
23	Payne Lake	533	206	130	430		
24	Lac Caniapiscau	470	180	564	1,850		
25	Lac aux Feuilles	452	175		Tidal lake		
26	Lake Albanel	444	171	389	1,276		
27	Baskatong Reservoir	413	159				
28	Dozois Reservoir	405	156	389	1,276		

=== Saskatchewan ===
Saskatchewan lakes 400 km^{2} (150 sq mi) or larger
Rank	Name	Area		Elevation		Notes	References
		km2	sq mi	m	ft		
1	Lake Athabasca	7,935	3,064	213	699	Partly in Alberta	
2	Reindeer Lake	6,650	2,570	337	1,106	Partly in Manitoba	
3	Wollaston Lake	2,681	1,035	398	1,306	Bifurcation lake	
4	Cree Lake	1,434	554	487	1,598		
5	Lac la Ronge	1,413	546	364	1,194		
6	Peter Pond Lake	778	300	521	1,709		
7	Doré Lake	640	250	459	1,506		
8	Churchill Lake	559	216	421	1,381		
9	Deschambault Lake	542	209	324	1,063		
10	Frobisher Lake	516	199	421	1,381		
11	Black Lake	464	179	281	922		
12	Montreal Lake	554	214	490	1,610		
13	Primrose Lake	448	173	599	1,965	Partly in Alberta	
14	Amisk Lake	430	170	294	965		
15	Lake Diefenbaker	430	170	557	1,827	Bifurcation lake	
16	Pinehouse Lake	404	156	384	1,260		

=== Yukon ===
Kluane Lake is the largest lake in Yukon at 409 km^{2} (158 sq mi) located at an elevation of 781 m (2,562 ft).

== International lakes ==
This is a list of lakes shared between Canada and the United States.

Canada / United States Lakes
Rank	Name	Province territory	U.S. state	Total area		Area (within Canada)		Area (within the US)		Elevation		Notes	References
				km2	sq mi	km2	sq mi	km2	sq mi	m	ft		
1	Lake Superior	Ontario	Michigan / Minnesota / Wisconsin	82,100	31,700	28,700	11,100	53,400	20,600	184	604		
2	Lake Huron	Ontario	Michigan	59,600	23,000	36,000	14,000	23,600	9,100	177	581		
3	Lake Erie	Ontario	Michigan / New York / Ohio / Pennsylvania	25,700	9,900	12,800	4,900	12,900	5,000	174	571		
4	Lake Ontario	Ontario	New York	18,960	7,320	10,000	3,900	8,960	3,460	75	246		
5	Lake of the Woods	Ontario / Manitoba	Minnesota	4,350	1,680	3,150	1,220	1,200	750	323	1,060		
6	Lake Champlain	Quebec	New York / Vermont	1,130	435	78	30	1,050	405	29–30	95–100		
7	Lake St. Clair	Ontario	Michigan	1,114	430					175	574		
8	Rainy Lake	Ontario	Minnesota	932	360					338	1,109		
9	Lake Memphremagog	Quebec	Vermont	102	39	77	30	26	10				
10	Ross Lake	British Columbia	Washington	47	18					463	1,519		
11	Osoyoos Lake	British Columbia	Washington	23	9	15	6	8	3				
12	Waterton Lake	Alberta	Montana	10	4					1,290	4,230		
