= Barren Grounds =

Stretch of uninhabited land in northern Canada

Coordinates: 65°N 106°W

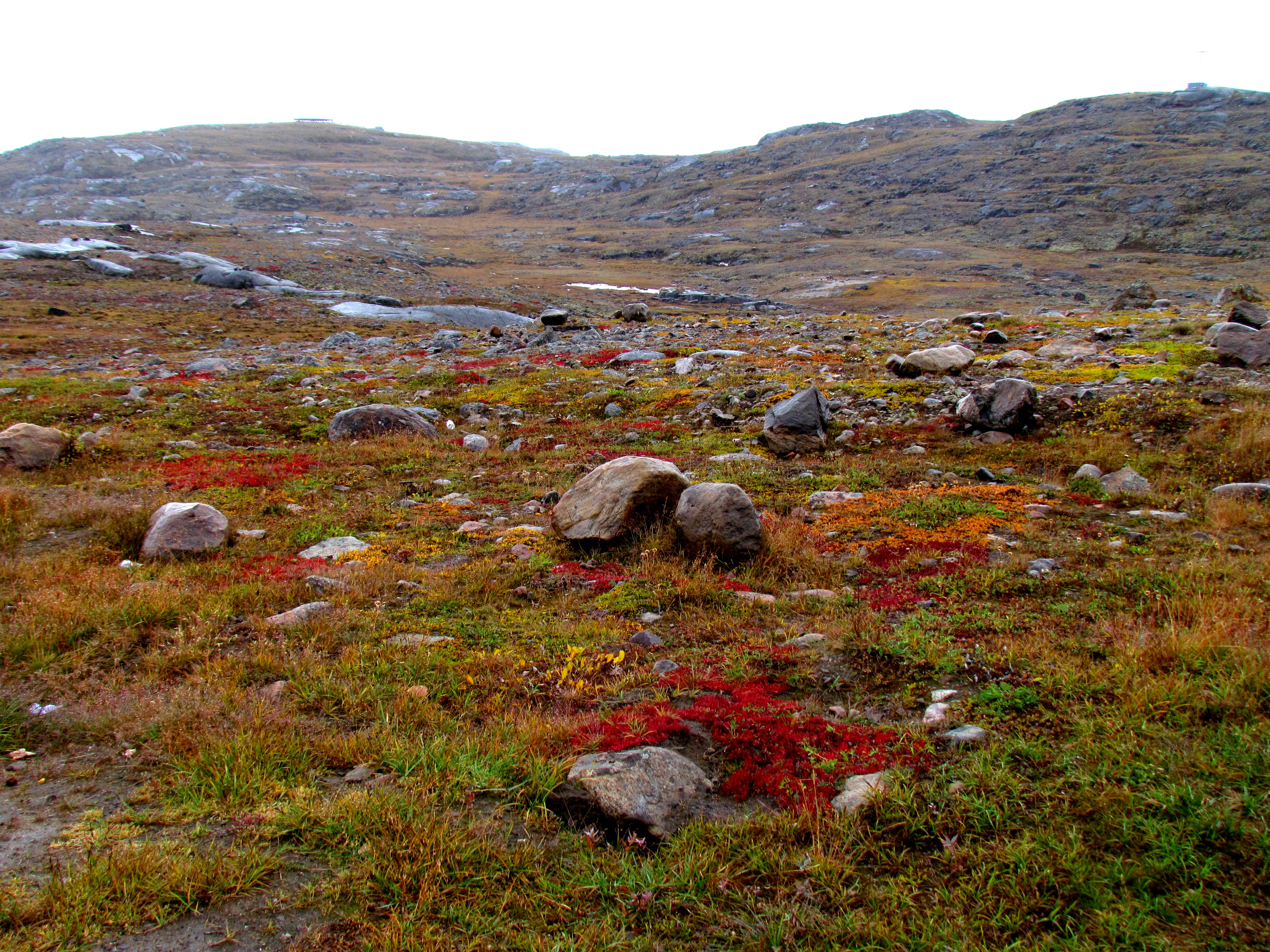
The Nunavut tundra

The Barren Grounds (also called Barren Lands) are a large area of tundra located in mainland Nunavut and stretching into the Northwest Territories in northern Canada. The Barren Grounds is nearly uninhabited with the exception of a few coastal villages and towns in Nunavut. The Barren Lands First Nation are located in northern Manitoba close to the Saskatchewan border.

== Geography ==
The Barren Grounds are tundra, and lakes are abundant. It has several long rivers, including the Coppermine, Back, Dubawnt, Kazan, and Thelon. The land in the area is mostly flat, although there are some hills in certain areas.

== See also ==
Barren-ground caribou (Rangifer tarandus groenlandicus), subspecies of caribou found in Canada and Greenland.

James Charles Critchell Bullock (6 September 1898 – 31 March 1953) an Englishman best known for his diaries and photographs of an expedition in 1923 with John Hornby across the Barren Grounds. On the basis of their expedition the Thelon Game Sanctuary was established in 1927, renamed the Thelon Wildlife Sanctuary in 1956.

Edgar Christian (1908-1927), a teenage English adventurer and writer. His diary was found in a log hut near the Thelon River Barren Land after his death.

John Hornby (1880–1927), ("Hornby of the North"), an English explorer, known for his expeditions attempting to live off the land with limited supplies in the Arctic region of northern Canada, notably in the "Barren Lands". He died there with his companions, a cousin Edgar Christian and Harold Adlard of starvation while overwintering in 1926-27.

Farley Mowat "Lost In The Barrens aka Two Against the North" (1956) is a children's adventure story that takes place in northern Manitoba and southwestern North West Territories in 1935.
