= Reference Island =

Island in Nunavut, Canada

- Location within Nunavut Location within Canada

Geography
- Location: Chesterfield Inlet
- Coordinates: 63°42′N 91°55′W
- Archipelago: Arctic Archipelago

Administration
- Canada
- Nunavut: Nunavut
- Region: Kivalliq

Demographics
- Population: Uninhabited

Reference Island is one of the uninhabited Canadian arctic islands in Kivalliq Region, Nunavut, Canada. It is located within Chesterfield Inlet.
