= Aberdeen Lake (Nunavut) =

Lake in Nunauvt, Canada

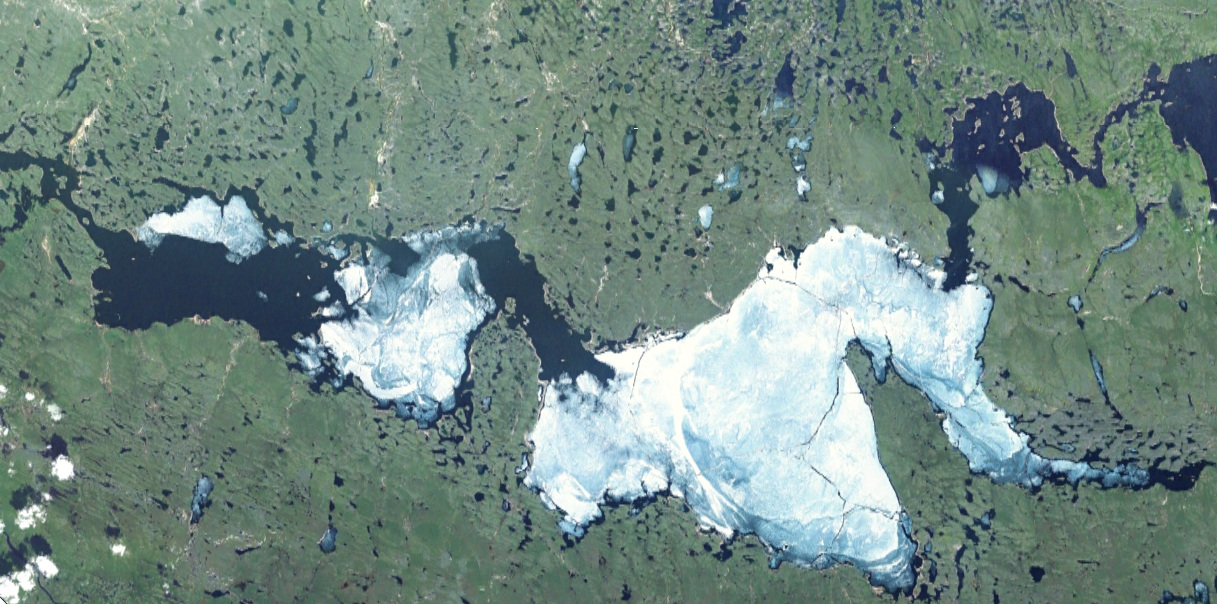
- Lake Aberdeen, Nunauvt

- Location in Nunavut
- Location: Kivalliq Region, Nunavut
- Coordinates: 64°27′N 99°00′W
- Primary inflows: Thelon River
- Primary outflows: Thelon River
- Basin countries: Canada
- Max. length: 90 km (56 mi)
- Max. width: 30 km (19 mi)
- Surface area: 1,100 km^{2} (420 sq mi)
- Surface elevation: 80 m (260 ft)
- Settlements: uninhabited

Aberdeen Lake is a large, irregularly shaped lake in Kivalliq Region, Nunavut, Canada. It is located on the Canadian Shield. The lake measures nearly 90 km (56 mi) east-west with a peninsula in the center separating the lake into almost two halves which extend nearly 30 km (19 mi) north-south. The Thelon Wildlife Sanctuary is to the west.

The Thelon River is the lake's primary inflow and outflow. The lake is downstream from Beverly Lake and upstream from Schultz Lake.

== See also ==
- List of lakes of Nunavut
- List of lakes of Canada
