= George Whalley =

Canadian academic and intelligence agent

- Born: Arthur George Cuthbert Whalley; July 25, 1915; Kingston, Ontario, Canada
- Died: May 27, 1983; Kingston, Ontario, Canada
- Education: Bishop's University, Oxford University, King's College, London
- Occupations: Professor, Queen's University
- Writing career
- Period: Canadian Modernist
- Genres: Literary Criticism; Poetry; Biography; Adaptations; Translation; Radio; Television
- Notable works: Poetic Process, No Man An Island, The Legend of John Hornby, Death in the Barren Ground: The Diary of Edgar Christian, The Marginalia of Samuel Taylor Coleridge
- Website: www.georgewhalley.ca

George Whalley (25 July 1915 – 27 May 1983) was a scholar, poet, naval officer and secret intelligence agent during World War II, CBC broadcaster, musician, biographer, and translator. He taught English at Queen's University in Kingston, Ontario (1950–80) and was twice the head of the department. He was elected to the Royal Society of Canada in 1959. He married Elizabeth Watts on July 25, 1944. They had three children: Katharine, Christopher, and Emily. His brother, Peter Whalley, was a famous artist and cartoonist.

== Education ==
Whalley attended St. Alban's School in Brockville, Ontario from 1922 to 1930. He completed his first B.A. in Classics at Bishop's University, in Lennoxville, Quebec, graduating in 1935. As a Rhodes Scholar, he completed his second B.A., studying Greats and Theology, at Oriel College, Oxford, in 1939. He received an M.A. from Oriel College, Oxford, in 1945. He completed his second M.A. degree, in English Literature, at Bishop's University in 1948. He received his Ph.D. from King's College, London, in English Literature by writing a study of Samuel Taylor Coleridge's reading, in 1950.

== Military service 1940–56 ==
Whalley served in the Royal Canadian Naval Volunteer Reserve (1940–56) and was on active duty in the Royal Navy (1940–45). He served on warships (including HMS Tartar and HMS Ceres), participated in the pursuit of the German battleship Bismarck, saved a life at sea (for which he was awarded a Royal Humane Society Bronze Medal) and two lives from the surf at Praa Sands, worked as a naval intelligence officer, designed a marker buoy (codenamed the FH 830) used during the Sicily and Normandy landings, and secretly tested and designed surfboats used to land Allied agents in Europe covertly.

From September 1941 to March 1943 Whalley was assigned to the Admiralty Naval intelligence Division in London and was involved in planning and implementing special intelligence operations to Norway, Belgium, Holland, and France. From March to July 1943 Whalley served on the staff of DNCXF Admiral Sir Bertram Ramsay in the Mediterranean Sea and Sicily. From July 1943 to March 1944 Whalley was assigned to the Admiralty Deputy Director Operations Division (irregular).

In the closing stages of the war, Whalley was returned to Canada to serve on Royal Canadian Navy destroyers. He was the First Lieutenant on HMCS Chaudiere from April to June 1945, and then on HMCS Saskatchewan from June to August 1945.

After the war, Whalley commanded HMCS Cataraqui, the shore station in Kingston, Ontario (1952–56). He retired with the rank of commander in 1956.

In 1944 he was awarded the CVSM Ribbon and Clasp. On 13 May 1946, during a convocation ceremony at Bishop's University, he received the 1939–45 Star Ribbon, the Africa Star Ribbon, the Italy Star Ribbon, the France and Germany Star Ribbon and Clasp, and the Defence Medal Ribbon.

== Poetry ==
Whalley published two collections of poems that were written during and in the aftermath of World War Two. The first, Poems 1939–1944, was issued as part of the Ryerson Poetry Chapbook series in 1946. It contains 17 poems. The second book, No Man An Island, appeared in 1948. It contains 41 poems, some of which are reprinted from the chapbook. The Collected Poems of George Whalley, edited by George Johnston and published in 1986, contains 76 poems, including all of the pieces that appeared in the two earlier books. The Complete Poems of George Whalley, a volume of more than 250 poems edited by Michael John DiSanto, contains all of the published verses and all known unpublished pieces gathered from manuscripts and typescripts preserved in Queen's University Archives and private family papers. Whalley's "rare body of wartime poetry" has been praised as "war poems [that] display a mature range and scope that is unmatched by any other of the second world war poets". John Ferns argues that Whalley's best poem is the seven-part 'Battle Pattern,' written about the pursuit and sinking of the Bismarck and calls it one of the great poems of World War II. Though Whalley's poetry has been generally neglected, some critics assert he deserves renewed attention.

Whalley nurtured the talents of younger poets. Michael Ondaatje, one of Whalley's students at Queen's University in the 1960s, reveals that Whalley helped him with a manuscript of his first volume of poetry, teaching him how to organize and structure a volume with deliberation

== Poetic Process ==
After receiving his MA in English from Bishop's University for the thesis 'A Critique of Criticism' in 1948, Whalley began revising the thesis into a book-length study that was published in 1953 with the title Poetic Process: An Essay in Poetics. Central to the argument is that the thinking which goes into the making of poetry is as important as the thinking that goes into the study of science. While not attacking science or dismissing its procedures for investigating the world, Whalley seeks to reset the balance by showing that poetry and science are two different modes of knowing that make use of language and know reality in distinct, opposing ways. Whalley calls the poetic mind (contemplative) and the scientific mind (technical), a key distinction throughout the book. He acknowledges that individuals are poets at moments, not perpetually, and any person can become a poet. He also recognizes that great discoveries in poetry and science involve the whole of the person working in harmony.

Poetic Process draws on the ideas of a wide range of writers, including Alfred North Whitehead, Dorothy Emmett, T. S. Eliot, W. B. Yeats, Paul Valery, Gerard Manley Hopkins, Jacques Maritain, Samuel Taylor Coleridge, Herbert Read, John Ruskin, Immanuel Kant, Sören Kierkegaard, and Henry Bergson, among others. But the synthesis Whalley produces makes the book as a whole distinct, not merely derivative of others' ideas.

In the introduction, Whalley explains that the book originated in a recognition that philosophy, psychology, criticism, and other disciplines of thought, had failed to adequately account for poetry. He declares that heuristic inquiry, an alter, open-minded pursuit is required in place of methodological techniques Whalley's notion of heuristic inquiry, in which criticism is defined as a 'getting-to-know', remains central to his thinking through the rest of his life. Years later, in a lecture given at Queen's University, Whalley revisited his view of heuristics by questioning predominant assumptions about knowing and rejecting the assumption that knowledge equates with analysis, mastery, and control of a studied object, instead calling for a way of knowing in which poetry is an instrument of inquiry and the poems tell us how to get to know.

In order to make a start on providing an adequate account of art, especially poetry, in Poetic Process, Whalley turns to writings and reflections written by artists: the second chapter, on Artists on Art, focuses on the Yeats and James Joyce and examines their thoughts on the experience of being poets and making poetry. Whalley repeatedly questions the fact and value distinction by arguing that value is inscribed in the very act of perception. A key element in the activity of making poetry, at its earliest stage, is the charge of feeling and value created with the poet's encounter with reality. The poem comes into being through a process of self-discovery (a discovery of the person and the poem) arising from the originating charge of feeling. After invoking Henry James's account of the poetic germ in his preface to The Spoils of Poynton and T.S. Eliot's analogy of contact catalysis in ‘Tradition and the Individual Talent’, Whalley uses quantum theory as a new analogy through which to understand the coming-into-being of a poem.

The centrality of imagination in perception and poetry is explored in detail in the middle chapters. In the fourth chapter Whalley compares the arguments made by Coleridge and Kant about the nature and quality of the imagination. In the fifth chapter Whalley develops his ideas about the importance of memory and feeling (the latter is distinct from emotion, which Whalley cautions is a dangerous element in life) in the process of image-making and in the poet's work of getting-to-know the other (person or thing). The latter is explained via John Keats's notion of negative capability, which Whalley sees as a rhythm in the mind of the poet that moves back and forth between sympathetic identifying and critical distancing. In later chapters he explores metaphor, symbol and myth, and music and rhythm in great detail and with much subtlety. Whalley's profound knowledge of music is revealed throughout those discussions. To substantiate his observations, Whalley reproduces passages of poetry from a significant number of writers: from John Donne to Yeats, from Shakespeare to T.S. Eliot.

The idea of Poetic, which is the opposite of Logic in Whalley's scheme, arises from Whalley's knowledge of the Greek roots of the word: poiein (to do or make); poiēma (a thing made – roughly poem); poiētes (a maker); poiēsis (the process or activity of making).

== Coleridge scholarship ==
Whalley was a leading expert on the writings of the poet and critic Samuel Taylor Coleridge, whom he read and studied from the late 1930s until the end of his life. His PhD thesis was entitled S.T. Coleridge: Library Cormorant. He published over twenty scholarly essays and articles on Coleridge's poetry, letters, criticism, and marginalia and these appeared in numerous journals including Queen's Quarterly, University of Toronto Quarterly, and Review of English Studies. His second book of literary criticism was Coleridge and Sara Hutchinson and the Asra Poems, which was published in 1955. For thirty years, he collected and organized Coleridge's marginalia, which was published in six volumes as part of The Collected Works of Samuel Taylor Coleridge. Whalley edited the first two volumes and was named as a co-editor, with H.J. Jackson, for the other four, which were published after his death.

== John Hornby and Edgar Christian writings ==
Whalley's interest in the story of John Hornby began before World War II when he read Unflinching, the edition of Edgar Christian's diary that was published in 1937. In the 1950s, Whalley began a careful study by collecting the extant materials, contacting the Christian family and those who knew Hornby and/or possessed relevant documents. As he declares in the preface to The Legend of John Hornby, his greatest debt was to George Douglas, who know Hornby. In the 1970s, Whalley travelled to the Thelon River site of the Hornby camp. He wrote Death in the Barren Ground, a 60-minute radio feature for CBC Radio (first broadcast 3 March 1954), based on Christian's diary and the Hornby legend. A television version was first broadcast on CBC Explorations on 28 October 1959. In The Legend of John Hornby, published in 1962, and Death in the Barren Ground: The Diary of Edgar Christian, published in 1980, Whalley wrote remarkable accounts of the relationship that tied Hornby and Christian together and led to their deaths.

The Legend of John Hornby has been identified as one of the great Canadian biographies and a pivotal text in Canadian modernism.

== Aristotle ==
In the 1960s Whalley worked on a translation (in Whalley's word, an 'Englished' version) of Aristotle's Poetics, which was largely complete by 1969 but not published until after his death. In a paper published in 1970, Whalley explained that he intended to keep very close to the words. Whalley's profound sensitivity to tragedy in life and literature, underlying his writings on John Hornby and Edgar Christian and informing many of his poems, was shaped through the events he witnessed during the Second World War and his longtime involvement with Aristotle's text, both in the translating of the Poetics and in the studying of it with students (who were given typescript copies of Whalley's work-in-progress) that participated in his Literary Criticism seminar at Queen's University.

== Radio and television broadcasts ==
Whalley wrote for and performed on radio and television from 1947 to 1972, most often for the CBC. Occasionally, he gave radio talks on literature, such as An Introduction to Poetry (a series of four 30 minute talks in September and October 1953) and Imagination in Action ( a series of four 30 minute talks in May 1956) and on major figures such as Henri Bergson (1958).

The first major radio feature he wrote was Death in the Barren Ground, noted above. This was followed by several dramatic features on W. B. Yeats including Love is a Crooked Thing (1955) on the relationship between Yeats and Maud Gonne, Words for Music Perhaps (1957) about Yeats and the speaking of poetry, The Articulation of the Image (1961) on his poetry, and Be Secret and Exult (1965), a tribute to Yeats on the 100th anniversary of his birth. He wrote two dramatic features on David Jones, The Poems of David Jones (1973) and The Secret Princes (1975), the writer and artist he long admired. Single Form (1966) and To an Unknown Country (1967), were both features dedicated to Dag Hammarskjöld, the second Secretary-General of the United Nations who died in 1961.

His most noted radio dramatizations are If This Is a Man (1965), a 140-minute adaptation of Stuart Woolf's translation of Primo Levi's Se questo e un uomo, and Let Us Now Praise Famous Men (1966), a 135- minute adaptation of James Agee's book of the same title. John Reeves, the CBC producer of Whalley's adaptations of Levi and Agee, has written about the radio productions. Whalley made a major contribution to broadcasting in Canada, and his works were repeatedly nominated for the Italia Prize for radio. Whalley's adaptations of the novel Peter Abelard by Helen Waddell, Malory's Morte d'Arthur, James Agee's Let Us Now Praise Famous Men, and Primo Levi's If This Is A Man are among the most significant the finest pieces of writing ever made for radio.

Whalley's radio broadcasts captured the ear and imagination of Michael Ondaatje, the notable Canadian writer, who identified his favourites as the adaptation of Agee's Let Us Now Praise Famous Men and Primo Levi's If This Is A Man.

== Views on language ==
Much of Whalley's criticism – and whatever might be called his philosophy – revolves around his contemplation of the central place of language in a community and in an individual's knowing and feeling. His idea of language is of a reciprocal relationship between a common language and an individual speaker and/or writer, as illustration in a metaphor involving music in which the instrument (language) plays on the musician (speaker/writer) as much as the speaker/writer uses the language.

== Books ==
A full bibliography of Whalley's publications, including articles, reviews, and broadcasts, is available. Listed here are books only.

- Poems 1939–44. Toronto: Ryerson, 1946. Print. [Ryerson Poetry Chap-Book No 116.]
- No Man an Island. Toronto: Clarke & Irwin, 1948. Print.
- Poetic Process. London: Routledge & Kegan Paul, 1953. Print.
- Editor. Selected Poems of George Herbert Clarke. With a foreword by George Whalley and with a general introduction by William O. Raymond. Toronto: Ryerson, 1954. Print.
- Coleridge and Sara Hutchinson and the Asra Poems. London: Routledge & Kegan Paul, 1955; Toronto: U of Toronto P, 1955. Print.
- Editor. Writing in Canada. Proceedings of the Canadian Writers' Conference, Queen's University, 28–31 July 1955. With a preface by George Whalley and with an introduction by F.R. Scott. Toronto: Macmillan, 1956. Print.
- The Legend of John Hornby. London: John Murray, 1962; Toronto: Macmillan, 1962. Print.
- Editor. A Place of Liberty, Essays on the Government of Canadian Universities. With an essay "Further Proposals" (154–75), by George Whalley. Toronto: Clarke & Irwin, 1964. Print.
- Editor. Death in the Barren Ground: The Diary of Edgar Christian. With an Introduction by George Whalley. Ottawa: Oberon Press, 1980. Print.
- Editor. Christopher Pepys 1914–1974: A Remembrance by his Friends. With contributions by George Whalley. Oxford: privately printed, 1980. Print.
- Editor. Marginalia I. The Collected Works of Samuel Taylor Coleridge, No. 12.1. Princeton: Princeton UP; London: Routledge & Kegan Paul, 1980. Print.
- Editor. Marginalia 2. The Collected Works of Samuel Taylor Coleridge, No. 12.2. Princeton: Princeton UP; London: Routledge & Kegan Paul, 1985. Print.
- Studies in Literature and the Humanities: Innocence of Intent. Editors. Brian Crick and John Ferns. Montreal: McGill-Queen's UP, 1985. Print.
- The Collected Poems of George Whalley. Editor. George Johnston. Kingston: Quarry Press, 1986. Print.
- H.J. Jackson and George Whalley. Editors. Marginalia 3. The Collected Works of Samuel Taylor Coleridge, No. 12.3. Princeton: Princeton UP; London: Routledge & Kegan Paul, 1992.
- H.J. Jackson and George Whalley. Editors. Marginalia 4. The Collected Works of Samuel Taylor Coleridge, No. 12.4. Princeton: Princeton UP; London: Routledge & Kegan Paul, 1998. Print.
- H.J. Jackson and George Whalley. Editors. Marginalia 5. The Collected Works of Samuel Taylor Coleridge, No. 12.5. Princeton: Princeton UP; London: Routledge & Kegan Paul, 1999. Print.
- H.J. Jackson and George Whalley. Editors. Marginalia 6. The Collected Works of Samuel Taylor Coleridge, No. 12.6. Princeton: Princeton UP; London: Routledge & Kegan Paul, 2001. Print.
- Translator. Aristotle's Poetics. With commentary by George Whalley. Ed. John Baxter and Patrick Atherton. Montreal: McGill-Queen's UP, 1997. Print.
- The Complete Poems of George Whalley. Editor. Michael John DiSanto. Montreal: McGill-Queen's UP, 2016. Print.
