= Rockhouse Island =

Island in Nunavut, Canada

- Location within Nunavut Location within Canada

Geography
- Location: Chesterfield Inlet
- Coordinates: 63°28′N 90°40′W
- Archipelago: Arctic Archipelago

Administration
- Canada
- Nunavut: Nunavut
- Region: Kivalliq

Demographics
- Population: Uninhabited

Rockhouse Island is one of the uninhabited Canadian arctic islands in Kivalliq Region, Nunavut, Canada. It is one of several islands located within the mouth of Chesterfield Inlet.

The island is approximately 15.1 km (9.4 mi) from the Inuit hamlet of Chesterfield Inlet.
