= Apqusiurniq Island =

Island in Nunavut, Canada

- Location within Nunavut Location within Canada

Geography
- Location: Chesterfield Inlet
- Coordinates: 63°35′39″N 091°00′56″W
- Archipelago: Arctic Archipelago

Administration
- Canada
- Nunavut: Nunavut
- Region: Kivalliq

Demographics
- Population: Uninhabited

Apqusiurniq Island is one of the uninhabited Canadian arctic islands in the Kivalliq Region, Nunavut, Canada. It is one of several islands located in Chesterfield Inlet.
