= Midway Island (disambiguation) =

Midway Island is an atoll of the United States Minor Outlying Islands located in the Hawaiian archipelago.

It may also refer to:

- Midway Island, Virginia, a community in Virginia
- North Midway Island and South Midway Island, islands in Canada
