= South Imilit Island =

Island in Nunavut, Canada

- Location within Nunavut Location within Canada

Geography
- Location: Chesterfield Inlet
- Coordinates: 63°32′17″N 91°06′42″W
- Archipelago: Arctic Archipelago

Administration
- Canada
- Nunavut: Nunavut
- Region: Kivalliq

Demographics
- Population: Uninhabited

South Imilit Island is one of the uninhabited Arctic islands in the Kivalliq Region, Nunavut, Canada. It is one of several islands in Chesterfield Inlet.
