= Maguse Lake =

Lake in Nunavut, Canada

- Location within Nunavut
- Location: Kivalliq Region, Nunavut
- Coordinates: 61°30′N 95°0′W
- Primary outflows: Maguse River
- Basin countries: Canada
- Max. length: 72 km (45 mi)
- Max. width: 7 km (4.3 mi)
- Surface area: 1,399 km^{2} (540 sq mi)
- Settlements: Arviat

Maguse Lake is a lake in Kivalliq Region, Nunavut, Canada. It drains eastward into Hudson Bay by way of the 56 km (35 mi) long Maguse River. The area is frequented by caribou. A fifteen-year project building a road to Maguse Lake from Arviat was completed in 2010.
