= Akreavenek Island =

Island in Nunavut, Canada

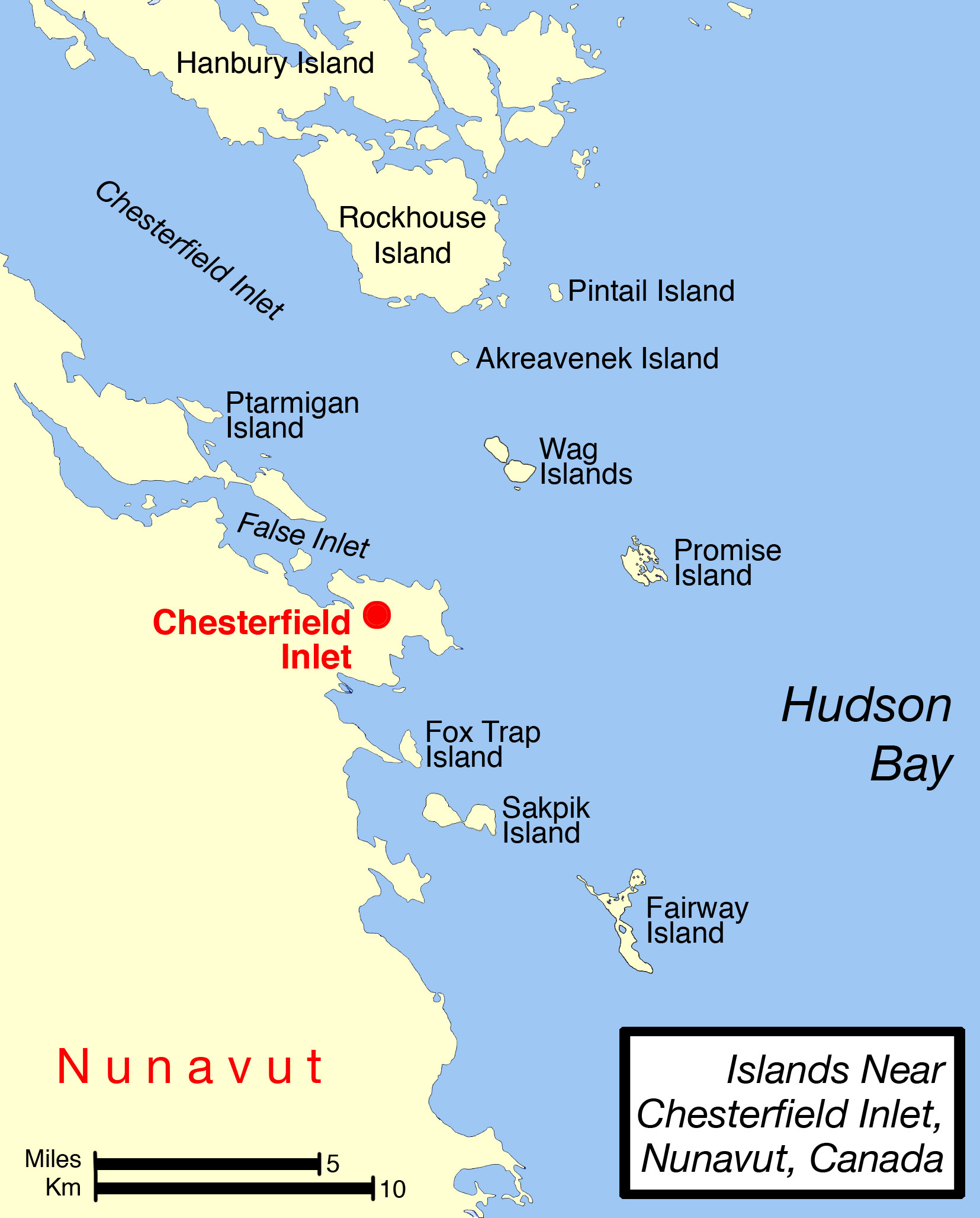
- Akreavenek Island within the mouth of Chesterfield Inlet.

- Location within Nunavut Location within Canada

Geography
- Location: Chesterfield Inlet
- Coordinates: 63°26′N 090°39′W
- Archipelago: Arctic Archipelago

Administration
- Canada
- Nunavut: Nunavut
- Region: Kivalliq

Demographics
- Population: Uninhabited

Akreavenek Island is one of the uninhabited Canadian arctic islands in the Kivalliq Region, Nunavut, Canada. It is one of several islands located within the mouth of Chesterfield Inlet.

It is approximately 11.4 km (7.1 mi) from the Inuit hamlet of Chesterfield Inlet.
