= North Midway Island =

Island in Nunavut, Canada

- Location within Nunavut Location within Canada

Geography
- Location: Chesterfield Inlet
- Coordinates: 63°42′15″N 92°04′00″W
- Archipelago: Arctic Archipelago

Administration
- Canada
- Territory: Nunavut
- Region: Kivalliq

Demographics
- Population: Uninhabited

North Midway Island is one of the uninhabited Canadian arctic islands in Kivalliq Region, Nunavut, Canada. It is irregularly shaped and is located within Chesterfield Inlet. Its twin, South Midway Island is situated 1 km (0.62 mi) to the south.
