= Beverly Lake (Nunavut) =

Lake in Nunavut, Canada

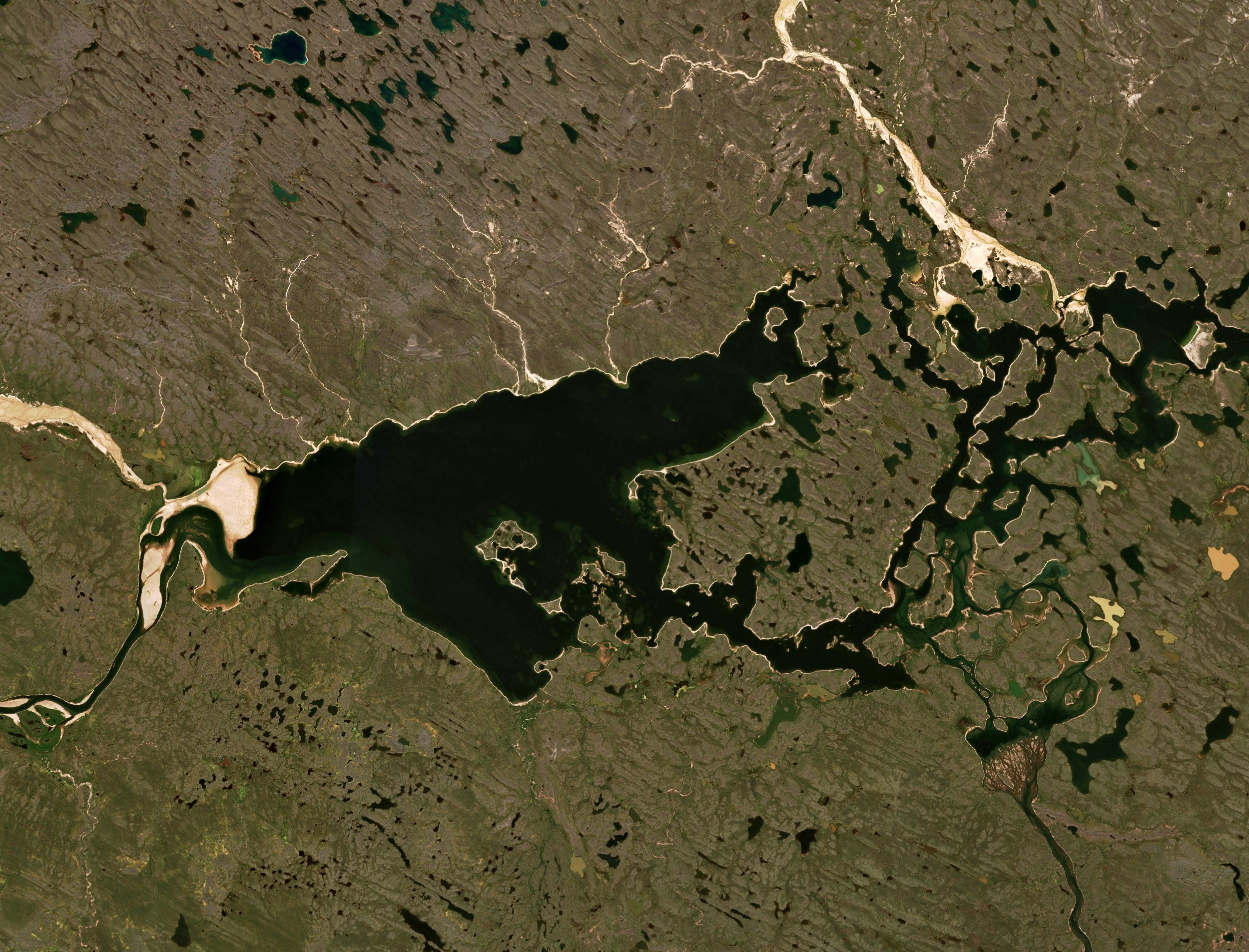
- Sentinel-2 image (2022)

- Location within Nunavut
- Location: Kivalliq Region, Nunavut
- Coordinates: 64°37′N 100°31′W
- Primary inflows: Thelon River, Kazan River, Dubawnt River
- Primary outflows: Aberdeen Lake
- Basin countries: Canada
- Settlements: uninhabited

Beverly Lake (Inuktitut: Tipjalik}, "it has driftwood") is a lake in the Kivalliq Region, Nunavut, Canada. It is located north of the Arctic tree line about 150 km (93 mi) northwest of Baker Lake, Nunavut. The western half of the lake is within Thelon Wildlife Sanctuary. The Thelon River, at the confluence with the Dubawnt River, empties into the lake's southwestern bank. The Kazan River empties into the Thelon River at Beverly Lake's southeastern bank, between Beverly and Aberdeen Lakes. A delta occurs on the Beverly Lake's southern edge, which includes the Isarurjuaq Peninsula.

== Geography ==
Most of the area is underlain by Dubawnt sandstone.

== Flora ==
The vegetation is low Arctic.

== Fauna ==
The lake boasts boreal and arctic fish species, uncommon to the area. Approximately 10,000 moulting Canada Geese use the Beverly/Aberdeen Lake area, including Lesser Snow geese colonies on islands within Beverly Lake, making it a key migratory bird terrestrial habitat site, and the largest concentration of the large race Canada geese within Canada. Raptors nest on the lake's north shore. The area directly north of the lake is mainly notable, however, as calving grounds for the Beverly herd, numbering over 200,000, of barren-ground caribou, as well as other herds of barren-ground caribou, totalling 500,000 strong.

== Ethnography ==
Akiliniq (A-ki, "the other side") is the hilly area on the lake's northern shores. It is the ancestral home of the Akilinirmiut, a Caribou Inuit group whose artifacts, mainly tent rings, meat caches and inuksuit were located in archeological sites. Because of driftwood abundance from the Thelon to Beverly Lake's banks, the area was also historically a source of winter wood and a trade center for generations of other central Arctic Inuit.

== Notable artist ==
Paul Toolooktook (1947 - 2003), born in Beverly Lake, became an artist of some notability with his basalt stone carvings and graphite/crayon drawings.
