= List of municipalities in Nunavut =

Location of Nunavut in Canada

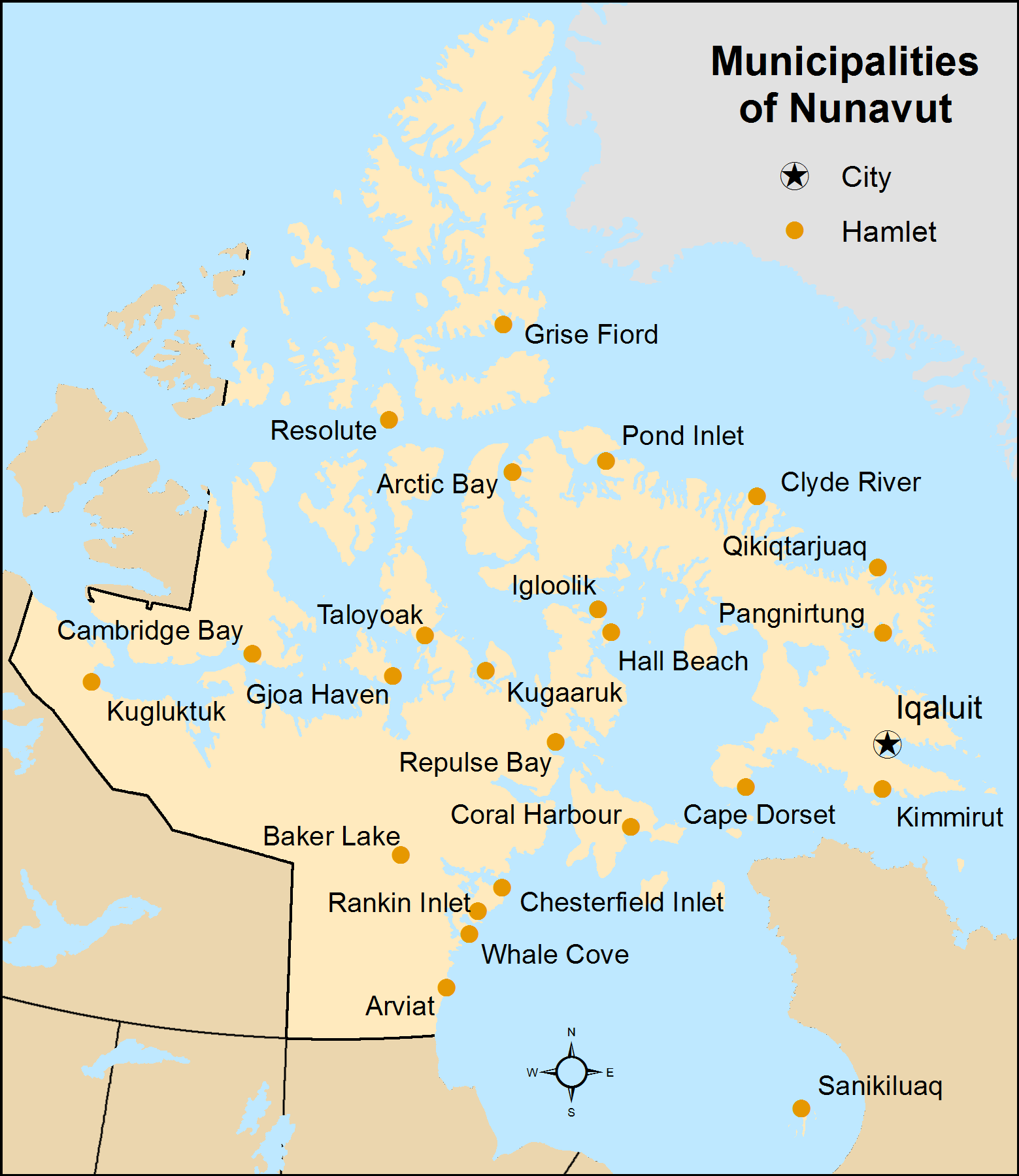
Distribution of Nunavut's 25 municipalities by type

Nunavut is the least populous of Canada's three territories with 36,858 residents as of 2021 Canadian census, but the largest territory in land area, at 1,836,993.78 km^{2} (709,267.26 sq mi). Nunavut is also larger than any of Canada's ten provinces. Nunavut's 25 municipalities cover only 0.2% of the territory's land mass, but are home to 99.95% of its population. The remaining 99.8% of Nunavut's land mass comprises three small unincorporated settlements (0.015%) and three vast unorganized areas (99.796%). As of 2021, no people were recorded as living in the unincorporated areas of Kitikmeot, Unorganized and Qikiqtaaluk, Unorganized, while a total of 18 were listed in Kivalliq, Unorganized.

Municipalities are created by the Government of Nunavut in accordance with the Cities, Towns and Villages Act (CTVA) and the Hamlets Act. According to the CTVA, a municipality is an "area within the boundaries of a municipal corporation, as described in the order establishing or continuing the municipal corporation" where a municipal corporation is either a city, town or village. According to the Hamlets Act, a municipality is similarly an "area within the boundaries of a hamlet, as described in the order establishing or continuing the hamlet". All of Nunavut's 25 municipalities are hamlets except for the City of Iqaluit, which is the territory's capital.

The largest municipality by population in Nunavut is the capital city, Iqaluit, with 7,429 residents, home to 20.2% of the territory's population. The smallest municipality by population is Grise Fiord with 144 residents. The largest municipality by land area is Kugluktuk, which spans 538.99 km^{2} (208.11 sq mi), while the smallest is Kimmirut at 2.3 km^{2} (0.89 sq mi).

== Cities, towns, and villages ==
An application can be submitted to incorporate a community as a city under the CTVA at the request of a minimum 25 residents that are eligible electors, or at the initiative of the Minister of Municipal and Community Affairs. The proposed city must have a minimum assessed land value of $200 million or an exception made by the Minister. Iqaluit is the only city in Nunavut, with 7,429 residents and a land area of 51.58 km^{2} (19.92 sq mi) in 2021. It incorporated as a city on April 19, 2001.

Although Nunavut has no municipalities with town status, the CTVA provides opportunity to incorporate a town. A town can be incorporated at the request of a minimum 25 residents that are eligible electors, or at the initiative of the Minister of Municipal and Community Affairs. The proposed town must have a minimum assessed land value of $50 million or an exception made by the Minister. Iqaluit held town status between 1980 and 2001. Nunavut also has no villages, but like town status the CTVA provides opportunity to incorporate a village. A village can be incorporated at the request of a minimum 25 residents that are eligible electors, or at the initiative of the Minister of Municipal and Community Affairs. The proposed village must have a minimum assessed land value of $10 million or an exception made by the Minister. Iqaluit held village status between 1974 and 1980.

Cities, towns, and villages have a council comprising a mayor and eight councillors serving for four years (three years, reducible to two or staggerable by bylaw, prior to 2019), although the Minister of Municipal and Community Affairs can vary the council size at the council's request. Since 2003, cities are uniquely able to refer to their councillors as "alderpersons" or "council members", but Iqaluit has not done so. There is no other difference in the governmental forms of a city, town, or village.

== Hamlets ==
At the request of a minimum 25 residents that are eligible electors, or at the initiative of the Minister of Municipal and Community Affairs, an application can be submitted to incorporate a community as a hamlet under the Hamlets Act. Unlike cities, towns and villages, the incorporation of hamlets is not conditioned by a prescribed minimum assessed land value.

Nunavut has 24 hamlets. The largest hamlet by population is Rankin Inlet, with 2,975 residents, and the smallest is Grise Fiord, with 144 residents. The largest hamlet by land area is Kugluktuk, which spans 538.99 km^{2} (208.11 sq mi), while the smallest is Kimmirut, at 2.30 km^{2} (0.89 sq mi).

Like cities, towns, and villages, hamlets have a council comprising a mayor and eight councillors, variable by the Minister of Municipal and Community Affairs on council request. Unlike the other forms, however, hamlets are also capable of having councillors directly appointed by the Minister – either ex officio or in a personal capacity – as long as such persons do not exceed a third of the total council composition and are otherwise eligible to serve. Councillors serve for four years if elected, or for the duration of the office held if appointed by the Minister ex officio or up to two years if appointed by the Minister in a personal capacity.

== List of municipalities ==
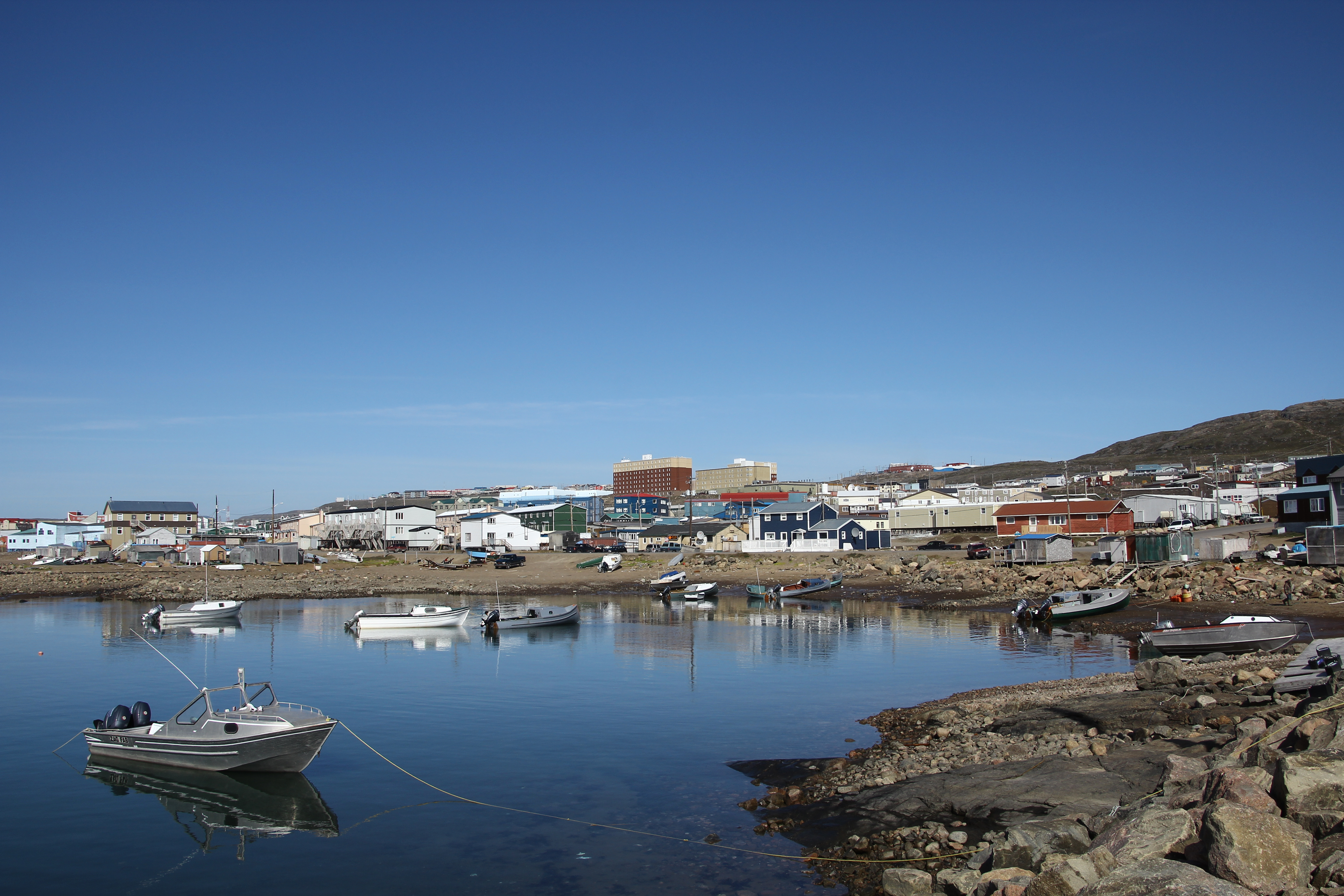
Iqaluit, Nunavut's capital city and largest municipality

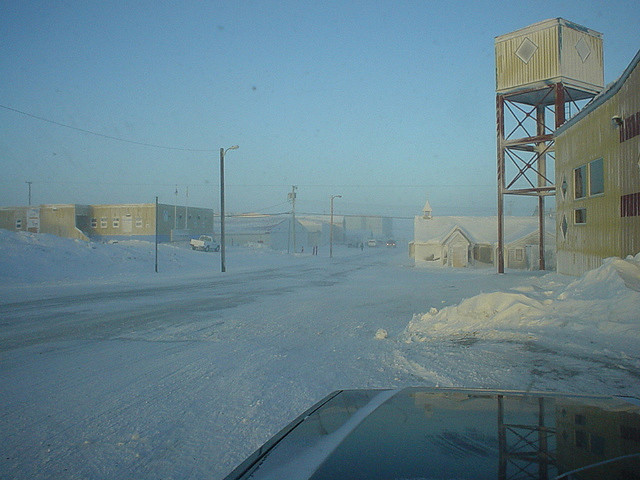
Rankin Inlet, Nunavut's second-largest municipality, largest hamlet and runner-up in the 1995 capital city plebiscite

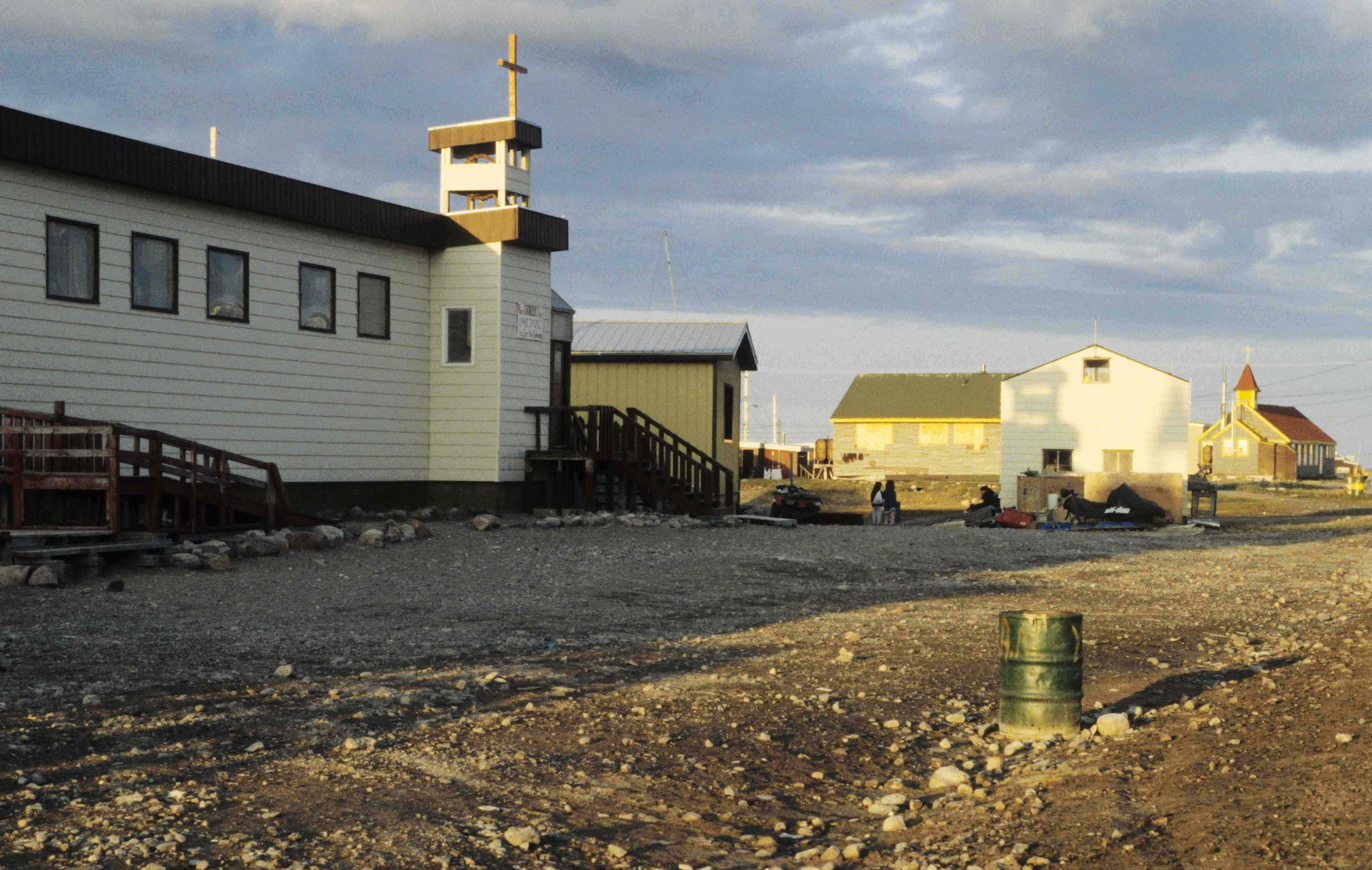
Nunavut's third-largest municipality and second-largest hamlet is Arviat.

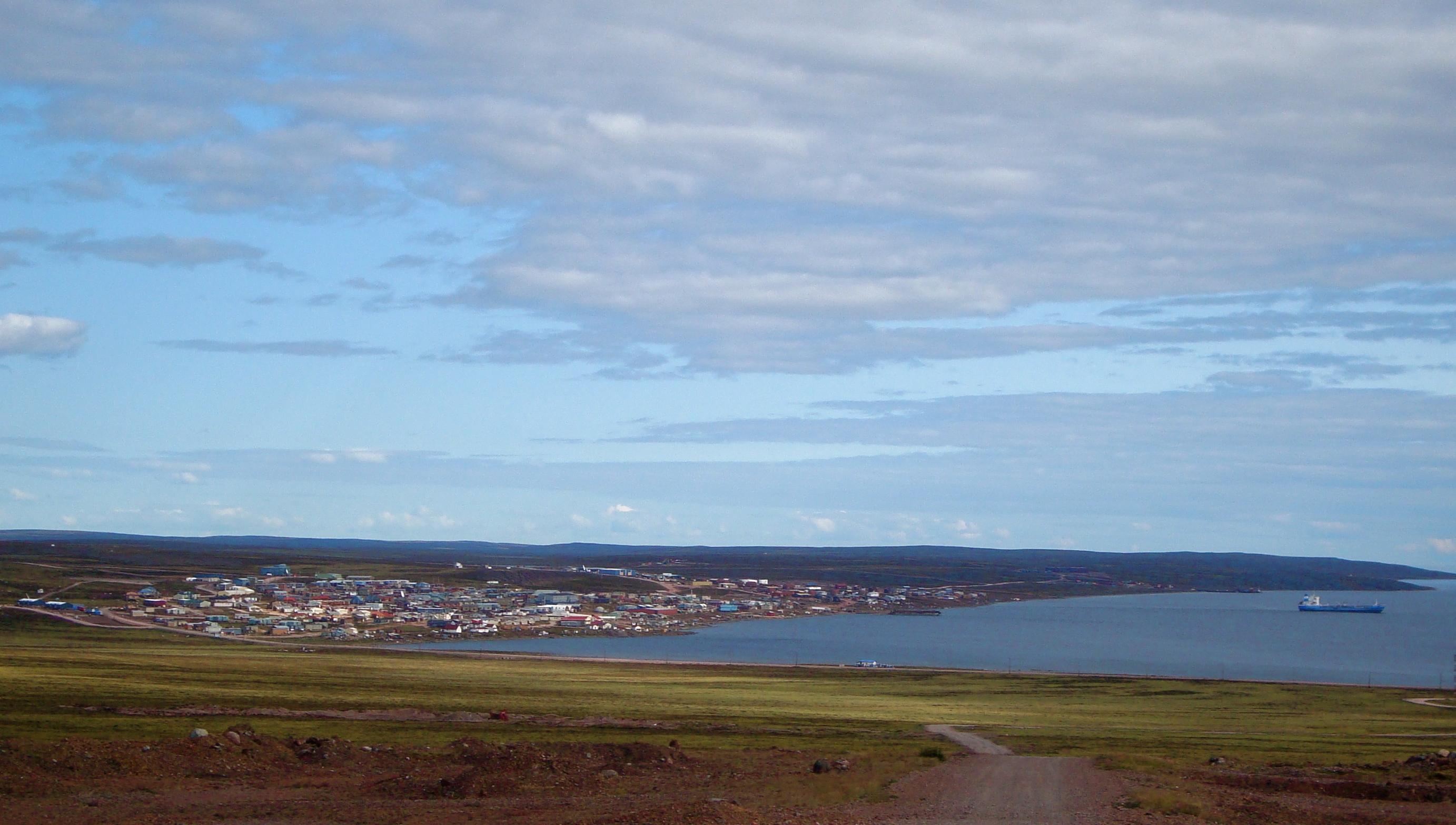
Baker Lake is the fourth-largest municipality in Nunavut.

List of municipalities in Nunavut
Name	Status	2021 Canadian census				
Name	Status	Population (2021)	Population (2016)	Change	Land area (km^{2})	Population density (/km^{2})
Arctic Bay	Hamlet	994	868	+14.5%	245.16	4.1
Arviat (Note: Eskimo Point was officially renamed Arviat on June 1, 1989.)	Hamlet	2,864	2,657	+7.8%	126.14	22.7
Baker Lake	Hamlet	2,061	2,069	−0.4%	179.54	11.5
Cambridge Bay	Hamlet	1,760	1,766	−0.3%	195.78	9.0
Chesterfield Inlet	Hamlet	397	437	−9.2%	139.49	2.8
Clyde River	Hamlet	1,181	1,053	+12.2%	103.38	11.4
Coral Harbour	Hamlet	1,035	891	+16.2%	126.39	8.2
Gjoa Haven	Hamlet	1,349	1,324	+1.9%	28.55	47.3
Grise Fiord	Hamlet	144	129	+11.6%	332.90	0.4
Igloolik	Hamlet	2,049	1,744	+17.5%	104.86	19.5
Iqaluit (Note: Frobisher Bay was officially renamed Iqaluit on January 1, 1987.)	City	7,429	7,740	−4.0%	51.58	144.0
Kimmirut (Note: Lake Harbour was officially renamed Kimmirut on April 1, 1982.)	Hamlet	426	389	+9.5%	2.30	185.2
Kinngait (Note: Cape Dorset was officially renamed Kinngait on February 28, 2020.)	Hamlet	1,396	1,441	−3.1%	9.89	141.2
Kugaaruk (Note: Pelly Bay was officially renamed Kugaaruk on December 3, 1999.)	Hamlet	1,033	933	+10.7%	5.06	204.2
Kugluktuk (Note: Coppermine was officially renamed Kugluktuk on January 1, 1996.)	Hamlet	1,382	1,491	−7.3%	538.99	2.6
Naujaat (Note: Repulse Bay was officially renamed Naujaat on July 2, 2015.)	Hamlet	1,225	1,082	+13.2%	406.19	3.0
Pangnirtung	Hamlet	1,504	1,481	+1.6%	7.98	188.5
Pond Inlet	Hamlet	1,555	1,617	−3.8%	170.83	9.1
Qikiqtarjuaq (Note: Broughton Island was officially renamed Qikiqtarjuaq on November 1, 1998.)	Hamlet	593	598	−0.8%	130.80	4.5
Rankin Inlet	Hamlet	2,975	2,842	+4.7%	20.03	148.5
Resolute	Hamlet	183	198	−7.6%	115.02	1.6
Sanikiluaq	Hamlet	1,010	882	+14.5%	109.68	9.2
Sanirajak (Note: Hall Beach was officially renamed Sanirajak on February 28, 2020.)	Hamlet	891	848	+5.1%	16.36	54.5
Taloyoak (Note: Spence Bay was officially renamed Taloyoak on July 1, 1992.)	Hamlet	934	1,029	−9.2%	35.38	26.4
Whale Cove	Hamlet	470	435	+8.0%	273.89	1.7
Total municipalities		36,840	35,944	+2.5%	3,476.17	10.6
Nunavut		36,858	35,944	+2.5%	1,836,993.78	0.0

== See also ==
- List of population centres in the Canadian territories
