= Illusive =

Illusive is the adjective form of illusory.

Illusive may also refer to:

- Illusive Islands, Nunavut, Canada
- Illusive Sounds, an independent Australian hip hop record label
- Illusive Tracks, a Swedish dark comedy thriller film
- Snowflake/Illusive, a 7" vinyl picture disc single by Psychic TV
- USS Illusive (AM-448), minesweeper ship
- Illusive (album)

== See also ==
- Illusion
