= Critchell =

Critchell is an English surname. Notable people with the surname include:

- James Charles Critchell-Bullock (1898–1953), English photographer and polar explorer
- Keaton Critchell (born 1997), Australian cricketer
- Kyle Critchell (born 1987), British football manager

== See also ==
- Iris Cummings, married name Iris Critchell (1920–2025), American aviator and Olympic swimmer
