= South Midway Island =

Island in Nunavut, Canada

- Location within Nunavut Location within Canada

Geography
- Location: Chesterfield Inlet
- Coordinates: 63°41′50″N 92°04′00″W
- Archipelago: Arctic Archipelago

Administration
- Canada
- Territory: Nunavut
- Region: Kivalliq

Demographics
- Population: Uninhabited

South Midway Island is one of the uninhabited Canadian arctic islands in Kivalliq Region, Nunavut, Canada. It is irregularly shaped and is located within Chesterfield Inlet. Its twin, North Midway Island is situated 1 km (0.62 mi) to the north.
