= Illusive Islands =

Island group in Nunavut, Canada

- Location within Nunavut Location within Canada

Geography
- Location: Chesterfield Inlet
- Coordinates: 63.64°N 91.41°W
- Archipelago: Arctic Archipelago

Administration
- Canada
- Nunavut: Nunavut
- Region: Kivalliq

Demographics
- Population: Uninhabited

The Illusive Islands are an uninhabited Canadian arctic islands group in Kivalliq Region, Nunavut. They are small, irregularly shaped, and are located mid-channel within Chesterfield Inlet.
