= Kivalliq, Unorganized =

Unorganized area of Nunavut, Canada

Kivalliq, Unorganized in Nunavut, Canada, is part of a larger census division known as the Kivalliq. It covers the entire region outside of the 7 communities. In the 2016 Canadian census and earlier the area was called Keewatin, Unorganized by Statistics Canada.

In the 2021 Canadian census, Kivalliq, Unorganized was the only of Nunavut’s three unorganized regions to be populated. According to the census there were 18 people who occupied four of its four private dwellings and a land area of 433,059.48 km^{2} (167,205.20 sq mi)

== Named places ==
Named places listed in 2021 by Statistics Canada are:

- Ennadai
- Fullerton
- Keewatin, Unorganized
- Kivalliq
- Kivalliq, Unorganized
- Maguse River
- Padlei
- Tavani
- Wager Bay
