= Peter Kritaqliluk =

Canadian politician

Peter Kritaqliluk (c. 1951-27 August 2011) was a two-term mayor of Arviat, Nunavut, Canada. As a mayor, he was involved in land claims negotiations with the Tunngavik Federation of Nunavut and advocated for the expansion of Arviat's community hall.

Kritaqliluk was the chair of the Nunavut Implementation Training Committee. He was also Nunavut Trust chair from 1990 to 2002. Nunavut Trust invests the $1.1 billion in federal payments being paid out under the Nunavut Land Claims Agreement. He was a member of the Kivalliq Inuit Association and one of the founding members of the Beverly and Qamanirjuaq Caribou Management Board. He also served on the board of directors of the Inuit Broadcasting Corporation.

He died on August 27, 2011, due to cancer.
