= Jamie Kablutsiak =

Canadian politician

Jamie Kablutsiak MLA

Member of the Legislative Assembly of Nunavut for Arviat South
- Incumbent
- Assumed office October 27, 2025
- Preceded by: Joe Savikataaq

Personal details
- Party: Non-partisan consensus government

Jamie Kablutsiak is a Canadian politician, who was elected to the Legislative Assembly of Nunavut in the 2025 Nunavut general election. He represents the electoral district of Arviat South.

Kablutsiak is a retired educator and was a councillor for Arviat.
