= Inuujaarvik Territorial Park =

Park in Kivalliq Region, Nunavut

Coordinates: 64°19′10″N 096°05′49″W

Inuujaarvik Territorial Park is a park in Kivalliq Region, Nunavut, Canada. It is located along the shore of Baker Lake.
