= Thelon River =

River in the Northwest Territories and Nunavut, Canada

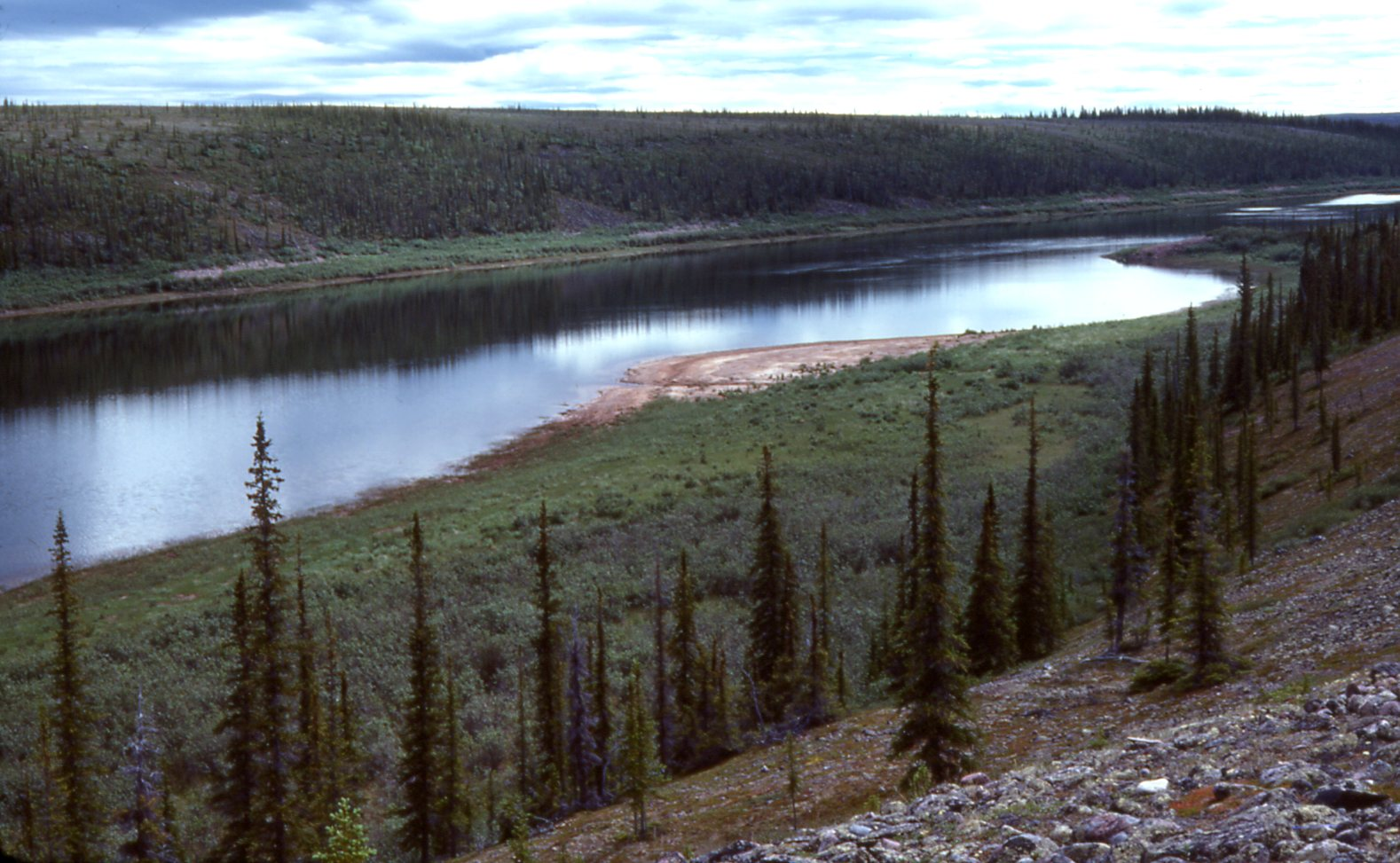
- An oasis-like section of the Thelon, below Warden's Grove

- Drainage basin of the Thelon River

- Thelon River mouth location
- Etymology: "on the other side" in Inuktitut
- Native name: Akilinik (Inuktitut)

Location
- Country: Canada
- Territories: Nunavut; Northwest Territories

Physical characteristics
- Source: Whitefish Lake
  - location: North Slave Region, Northwest Territories
  - coordinates: 62°30′32″N 106°49′17″W
  - elevation: 371 m (1,217 ft)
- Mouth: Chesterfield Inlet
  - location: Baker Lake, Nunavut
  - coordinates: 64°16′30″N 96°4′35″W
  - elevation: 0 m (0 ft)
- Length: 900 km (560 mi)
- Basin size: 142,400 km^{2} (55,000 sq mi)

Basin features
- Tributaries
  - left: Dubawnt River, Kazan River

The Thelon River (Inuktitut: Akilinik, lit. "on the other side") stretches 900 kilometres (560 mi) across northern Canada. Its source is Whitefish Lake in the Northwest Territories, and it flows east to Baker Lake in Nunavut. The Thelon ultimately drains into Hudson Bay at Chesterfield Inlet.

== Geography ==
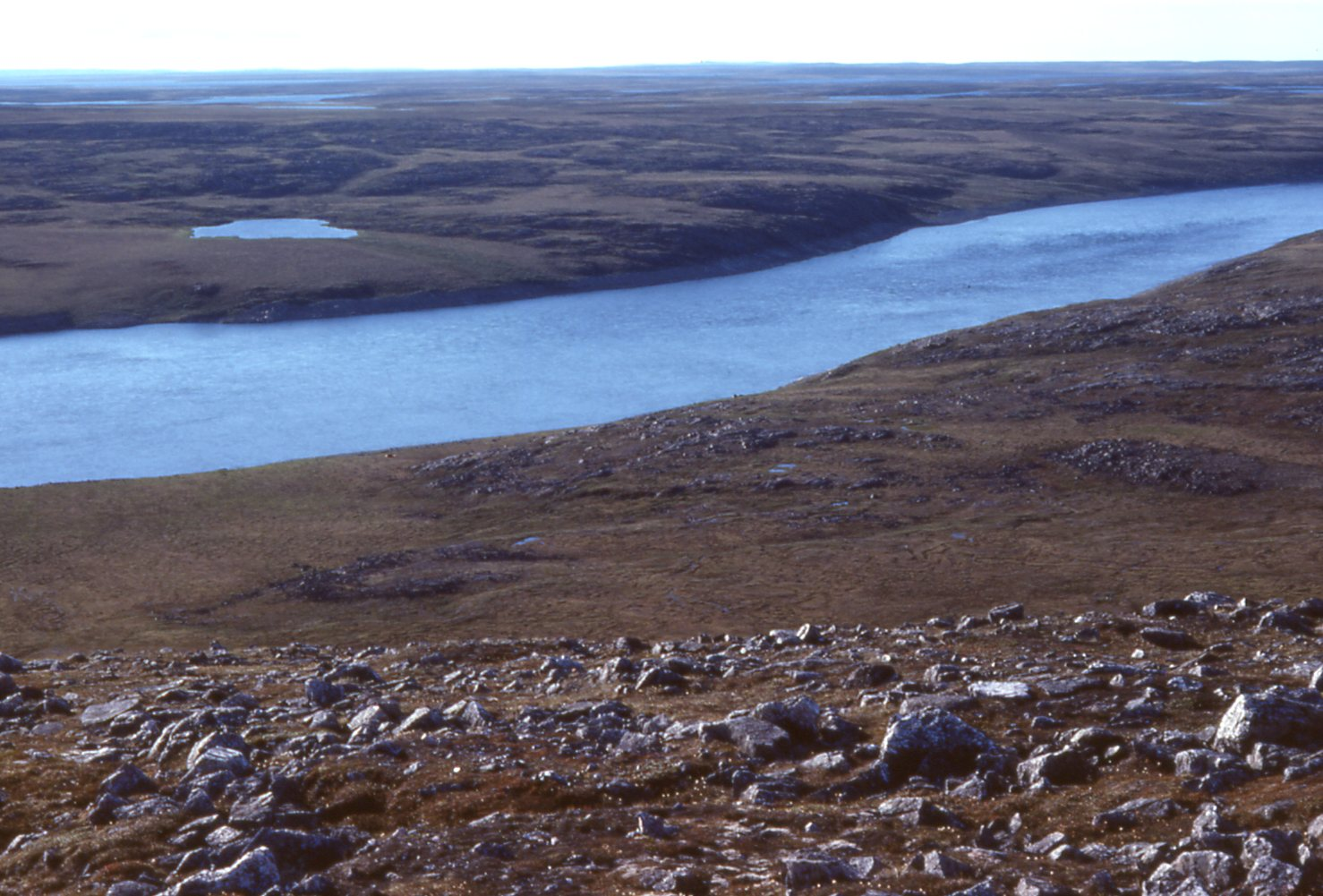
The lower section of the Thelon River from the "Half-Way Hills" (midway between Schultz Lake and Baker Lake)

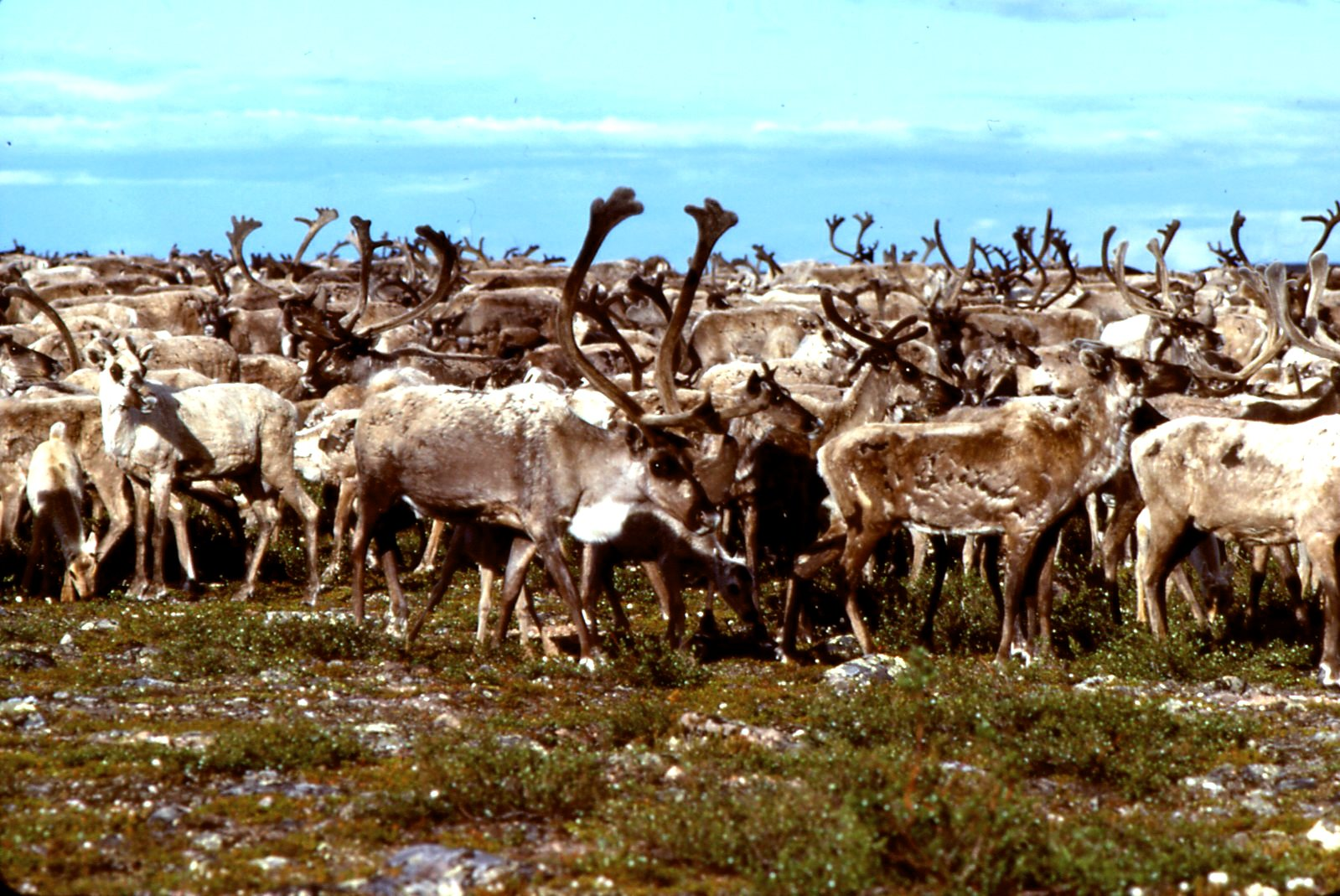
Barren-ground caribou above the Hanbury River junction near the Thelon River in 1978

The drainage basin of the Thelon River encompasses some 142,400 square kilometres (55,000 sq mi). Located far from almost all human development, the Thelon and its surroundings are entirely pristine wilderness. It has been described as Canada's remotest river.

The river has a width of up to a kilometre (0.6 mi) along much of its lower section, widening into Beverly, Aberdeen, and Schultz Lakes about 100 kilometres (62 mi) upstream from its mouth at Baker Lake.

== Fauna ==
Approximately 100 moose and more than 2,000 muskoxen forage on the land around the Thelon. 300,000 migrating Barren-ground Caribou cross the river every fall and spring.

== History ==
Inuit – including Caribou Inuit and Copper Inuit – have long occupied the sparsely populated lands around the Thelon. Artifacts of Inuit hunting and travel (including inukshuk guide stones) are readily observed near the river.

In 1770–71 English explorer Samuel Hearne crossed the Thelon while exploring Canada's northern interior. James William Tyrrell led an expedition through the area in 1900.

Over the winter of 1926–27 John Hornby starved to death on the Thelon along with two other men. They had planned to hunt migrating caribou, but failed to find the herd. Nevertheless, on the basis of Hornby's earlier explorations with James Charles Critchell Bullock in 1923, the Thelon Game Sanctuary was established in 1927, renamed the Thelon Wildlife Sanctuary in 1956.

In 1927(?) the Norwegian explorer and writer Helge Ingstad went by dog sled to the headwaters of the Thelon (Lynx Lake) together with native peoples from the east end of Great Slave Lake. This he detailed in his book The Land of Feast and Famine.

== Tourism ==
In 1990 the lower 545 kilometres (339 mi) of the Thelon were designated a Canadian Heritage River. Although there is no road access to the river, a number of wilderness campers and canoeists visit the Thelon every summer.

== Cultural references ==
The basin of the Thelon is mentioned in the 1979 sci-fi novel Beetle in the Anthill by Boris and Arkady Strugatsky as the location of the embassy of Golovans: intelligent canoid (dog-like) race evolved at Saraksh planet.

== See also ==
- List of longest rivers of Canada
- List of rivers of the Northwest Territories
- List of rivers of Nunavut
