= Edgar Christian =

English adventurer & writer (1908-1927)

Edgar Vernon Christian (6 June 1908 – June 1927) was an English adventurer and writer who died in Northern Canada.

He was born in Earls Barton, Northamptonshire, the son of Lt Col William Francis (Frank) Christian, RA and his wife Marguerite (née Hornby). He was one of five children in the family. Soon after he was born the family moved to Cosham, Hampshire. He attended prep school at the Grange School, Shorncliffe Road, Folkestone and hoped to follow his brother Charles to Marlborough College, but eventually in 1924 he went on to Dover College which was more local, despite the fact the family moved in 1919 to Bron Dirion in North Wales.

After Dover College, at the age of 18, Edgar went to Canada. He left Edmonton, Alberta in 1926 on a trapping expedition with his cousin John Hornby ("Hornby of the North") and a companion, Harold Adlard. Hornby was older and had been on similar expeditions before. They attempted to stay there for a year but having missed the expected herd of migrating caribou, they lacked sufficient food to survive the winter, and all died of starvation in a log hut near the Thelon River barren lands. He was the last of the party to die, sometime after the first of June 1927. An edition of the diary kept by him detailing this misadventure, which was found placed in the stove of the cabin, was published (with portions omitted) in 1937 under the title "Unflinching". The diary is kept at his old school, Dover College, but the story has been told several other times in books and plays. On 15 November 1939, a half-hour programme, based on his diary, was broadcast by the BBC. A fuller edition of the diary by George Whalley, including Christian's letters to his father and mother, was published in 1980 as Death in the Barren Ground.

The Bruce Valpy play Hornby was performed in the 2007 Canterbury Festival by pupils from Dover College.
