= Maguse River =

Coordinates: 61°17′N 094°05′W

Location
- Country: Canada
- Territory: Nunavut

Physical characteristics
- Source
  - location: Maguse Lake
- Mouth
  - location: Northwestern Hudson Bay
- Length: 56 km (35 mi)

The Maguse River is located in the Kivalliq Region of northern Canada's territory of Nunavut. It originates at Maguse Lake and flows 56 km (35 mi) eastward to northwestern Hudson Bay. At one time, there was a trading post at the mouth of the river.

== See also ==
- List of rivers of Nunavut
