= Arviat Airport =

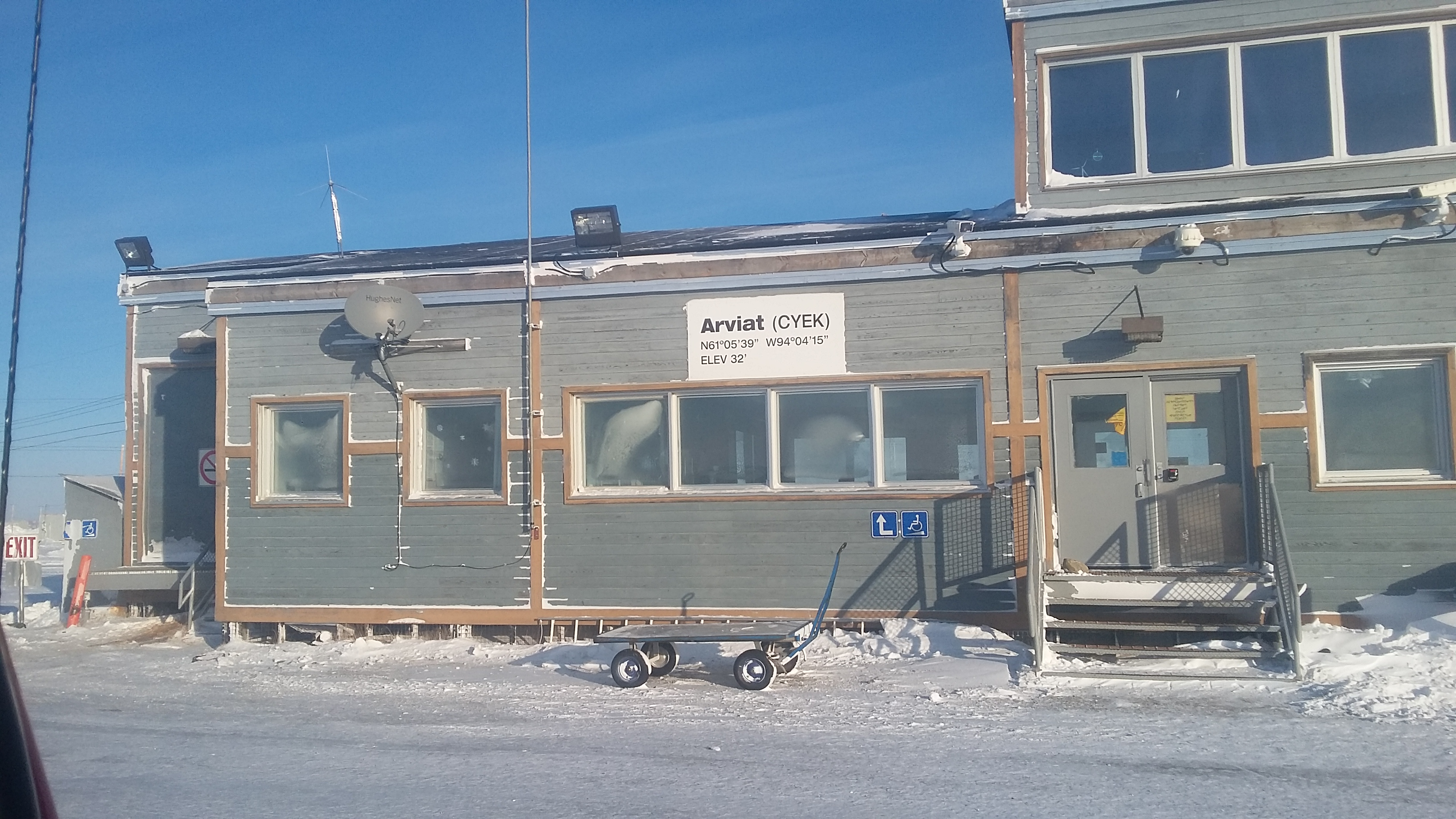
- IATA: YEK; ICAO: CYEK; WMO: 71812

Summary
- Airport type: Public
- Operator: Government of Nunavut
- Location: Arviat, Nunavut
- Time zone: CST (UTC−06:00)
  - Summer (DST): CDT (UTC−05:00)
- Elevation AMSL: 34 ft / 10 m
- Coordinates: 61°05′38″N 094°04′18″W

Map
- Location in Nunavut CYEK (Canada)

Runways
Direction	Length		Surface
Direction	ft	m	Surface
15/33	4,000	1,219	Gravel

Statistics (2010)
- Aircraft movements: 3,041
- Source: Canada Flight Supplement; Movements from Statistics Canada; Environment Canada

Arviat Airport (IATA: YEK, ICAO: CYEK) is located at Arviat, Nunavut, Canada, and is operated by the government of Nunavut. Local taxis provide service between the hamlet and the airport for $7.

== Airlines and destinations ==
Airlines	Destinations
Calm Air	Rankin Inlet
Nolinor Aviation	Charter: Meadowbank

== See also ==
- Arviat Water Aerodrome
