= Arviat =

Arviat ᐊᕐᕕᐊᑦ (Inuktitut)
- Hamlet
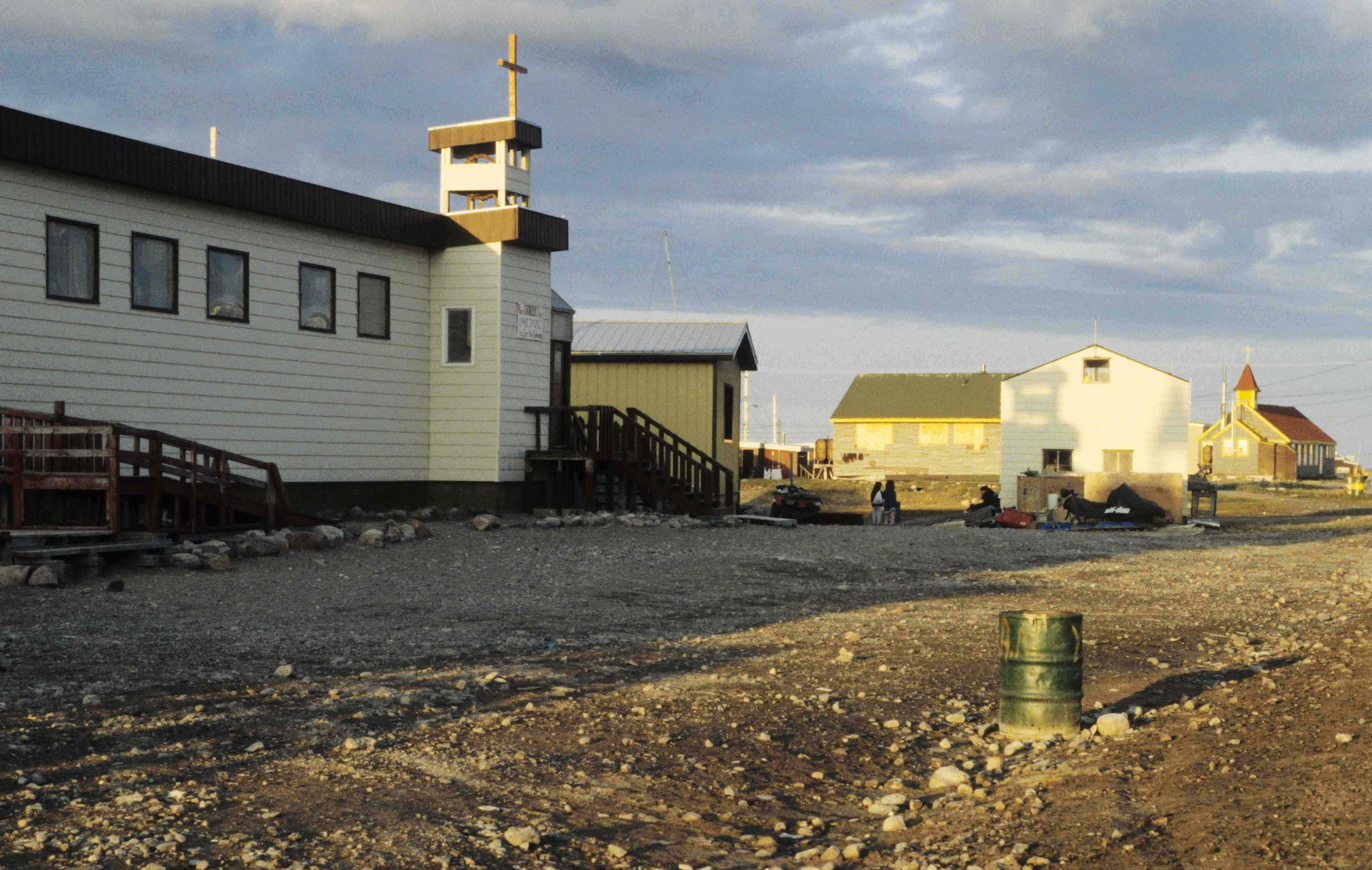
- Two of the churches in Arviat

- Flag

- Location within Nunavut Location within Canada
- Coordinates: 61°06′30″N 094°03′30″W
- Country: Canada
- Territory: Nunavut
- Region: Kivalliq
- Electoral district: Arviat North-Whale Cove; Arviat South

Government
  - Type: Hamlet
  - Mayor: Joe Savikataaq Jr.
  - Senior Administrative Officer: Steve England
  - MLA for Arviat North-Whale Cove: John Main
  - MLA for Arviat South: Jamie Kablutsiak

Area (2021)
  - Total: 126.14 km^{2} (48.70 sq mi)
  - Population Centre: 2.42 km^{2} (0.93 sq mi)
- Elevation: 10 m (33 ft)

Population (2021)
  - Total: 2,864
  - Density: 22.7/km^{2} (59/sq mi)
  - Population Centre: 2,766
  - Population Centre density: 1,143.6/km^{2} (2,962/sq mi)
- Demonyms: Arviaqmiut, Arviatmiut
- Time zone: UTC−06:00 (CST)
  - Summer (DST): UTC−05:00 (CDT)
- Postal code: X0C 0E0
- Area code: 867
- Website: www.arviat.ca

Arviat (Inuktitut pronunciation: [aʁviˈat], syllabics: ᐊᕐᕕᐊᑦ; formerly called Eskimo Point until 1 June 1989) is a predominantly Inuit hamlet located on the western shore of Hudson Bay in the Kivalliq Region of Nunavut, Canada. Arviat ("place of the bowhead whale") is derived from the Inuktitut word arviq meaning "Bowhead whale". Earlier in history, its name was Tikirajualaaq ("a little long point"), and Ittaliurvik ("a place where the people make tents").

== Demographics ==
Federal census population history of Arviat
Year	Pop.	±%
1976	848	—
1981	1,022	+20.5%
1986	1,189	+16.3%
1991	1,323	+11.3%
1996	1,559	+17.8%
2001	1,899	+21.8%
2006	2,060	+8.5%
2011	2,318	+12.5%
2016	2,657	+14.6%
2021	2,864	+7.8%
Source: Statistics Canada

In the 2021 Canadian census conducted by Statistics Canada, Arviat had a population of 2,864 living in 632 of its 694 total private dwellings, a change of 7.8% from its 2016 population of 2,657. With a land area of 126.14 km^{2} (48.70 sq mi), it had a population density of 22.7/km^{2} (58.8/sq mi) in 2021.

Panethnic groups in the Hamlet of Arviat (2001−2021)
Panethnic group	2021		2016		2011		2006		2001	
Panethnic group	Pop.	%	Pop.	%	Pop.	%	Pop.	%	Pop.	%
Indigenous	2,730	95.62%	2,525	95.28%	2,190	94.6%	1,915	93.19%	1,790	94.46%
European (Note: Statistic includes all persons that did not make up part of a visible minority or an indigenous identity.)	95	3.33%	105	3.96%	115	4.97%	120	5.84%	100	5.28%
South Asian	20	0.7%	0	0%	0	0%	10	0.49%	0	0%
African	10	0.35%	20	0.75%	0	0%	20	0.97%	10	0.53%
Southeast Asian (Note: Statistic includes total responses of "Filipino" and "Southeast Asian" under visible minority section on census.)	0	0%	10	0.38%	0	0%	10	0.49%	0	0%
East Asian (Note: Statistic includes total responses of "Chinese", "Korean", and "Japanese" under visible minority section on census.)	0	0%	0	0%	0	0%	10	0.49%	0	0%
Latin American	0	0%	0	0%	0	0%	10	0.49%	0	0%
Middle Eastern (Note: Statistic includes total responses of "West Asian" and "Arab" under visible minority section on census.)	0	0%	0	0%	0	0%	0	0%	0	0%
Other/multiracial (Note: Statistic includes total responses of "Visible minority, n.i.e." and "Multiple visible minorities" under visible minority section on census.)	0	0%	0	0%	10	0.43%	0	0%	0	0%
Total responses	2,855	99.69%	2,650	99.74%	2,315	99.87%	2,055	99.76%	1,895	99.79%
Total population	2,864	100%	2,657	100%	2,318	100%	2,060	100%	1,899	100%
Note: Totals greater than 100% due to multiple origin responses

== Community ==
Arviat is the southernmost community on the Nunavut mainland and is close to the geographical centre of Canada. In Arviat, Inuktitut and English are primarily spoken, having the third largest population in Nunavut, behind Rankin Inlet and Iqaluit. From the 2011 Canadian census to the 2016 Canadian census there was a population increase of 14.6%.

The community became a hamlet under the name Eskimo Point (name first appeared on maps in 1738) in 1977.

Cargo and passenger air service is provided by Calm Air, Canadian North and Nolinor Aviation (charter only) out of Arviat Airport. Destinations include other settlements in Nunavut and Manitoba, including Winnipeg.

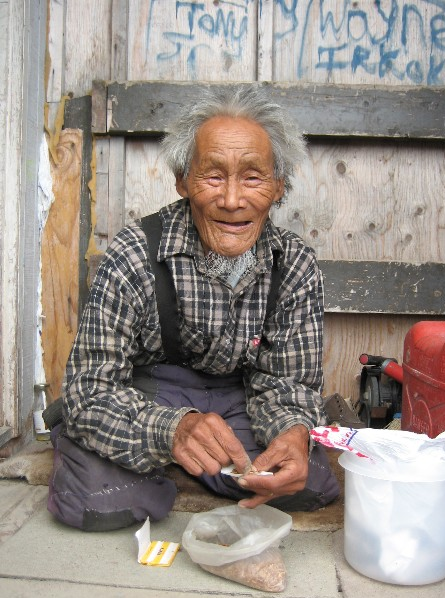
An elder of Arviat

Hunting and fishing are very active in the community; they are the primary source of sustenance.

To the south, the town of Churchill, Manitoba is accessible by boat during the summer and fall. Churchill is accessible by snowmobile and Bombardier from Arviat. Churchill is often travelled to for supplies.

Arviat is known for its artists and musicians. Musicians from the community include: Susan Aglukark; Simon "Johnny Cash of the North" Sigyariaq; the band Uniaqtuq, with Arsene, Pelagie and Mary Angalik; the Arviat Band, with John and Billy Kuksuk, Paul Kattau and others; and the Irksuk band, played by Paul Irksuk and sons. All have had CDs recorded commercially.

Many types of wildlife are abundant. Within the vicinity of Arviat, polar bears, millions of migratory birds, beluga whales, and caribou are often spotted.

The only access is by air and snowmobile, but the Nunavut government and the federal Senate member for Nunavut, Dennis Patterson, are investigating the possibility of a highway from Thompson, Manitoba, Lynn Lake, or Gillam, Manitoba, or an extension of the Hudson Bay Railway from Churchill, Manitoba to Rankin Inlet via Arviat. Similar to other Arctic coast communities there is an annual sealift but it is not available to passengers.

Arviat was originally inhabited by the Paallirmiut, a coastal/inland Inuit band. In 1957, dying of starvation, the last remaining Ihalmiut, another Caribou Inuit band, were relocated to Arviat by the Royal Canadian Mounted Police. Though there are differences between the two bands, they recognize a need to work together in order to benefit the community.

In 1993, Mark Kalluak published a historical essay on soapstone carving in Arviat, entitled Pelts to Stone. A History of Arts and Crafts Production in Arviat.

Arviat was featured in Dancing Towards the Light, a 2017 CBC News short film and article telling the story of the hamlet's annual dance competition.

The community is home to Arviaqpaluk Radio, a community radio station which operates under an exemption from CRTC licensing for low-power broadcasters.

== Politics ==
The community is represented in the Legislative Assembly of Nunavut by John Main in the electoral district of Arviat North-Whale Cove, and Joe Savikataaq in Arviat South. Savikataaq was Premier of Nunavut from 2018 to 2021.

Savikataaq's son, Joe Savikataaq Jr., became mayor of the community in March 2020, following the death in office of Bob Leonard.

== Education ==
On 11 February 2026, it was announced that Arviat had been selected to be the location of the main campus of the first Inuit-led university in Inuit Nunangat, expected to open in 2030. It is called Inuit Nunangat University.

== Recreation ==
The Hudson Bay Quest sled-dog race was run from Churchill to Arviat for the first time in 2004.

== Internet ==
The community has been served by the Qiniq network since 2005. Qiniq is a fixed wireless service to homes and businesses, connecting to the outside world via a satellite backbone. The Qiniq network is designed and operated by SSI Micro. In 2017, the network was upgraded to 4G LTE technology, and 2G-GSM for mobile voice.

== Climate ==
According to the Köppen climate classification, Arviat has a subarctic climate (Köppen Dfc). However, using Nordenskjöld's alternate formula for distinguishing Arctic from subarctic climates, it has a polar climate (Köppen ET); as expected from this, it is north of the Arctic tree line. Spring is slow to warm up, with June being cooler than September and May cooler than October. With a yearly mean of −9.3 °C (15.3 °F) it is the third-warmest in Nunavut and the maximum of 33.9 °C (93.0 °F) recorded on 22 July 1973 is second only to that of Kugluktuk. Arviat has a yearly rainfall of 174.4 mm (6.87 in), the fourth-wettest in Nunavut, but only 112.4 cm (44.3 in) of snow, the third-least. Temperatures above freezing have never been recorded between 18 November and 17 March, inclusive; conversely, accumulating snow has never been recorded in July or August.

Climate data for Arviat (Arviat Airport) WMO ID: 71174; coordinates 61°05′38″N 94°04′18″W; elevation: 10.4 m (34 ft); 1991–2020 normals, (Note: Climate data 1991–2020 is a composite recorded at Arviat A; Climate ID: 2300MKF; coordinates 61°06′N 94°04′W; elevation: 10.4 m (34 ft), Arviat Climate; WMO ID: 71322; coordinates 61°06′N 94°04′W; elevation: 9.8 m (32 ft), and Arviat AWOS; Climate ID: 2300426; coordinates 61°06′N 94°04′W; elevation: 10.4 m (34 ft)) extremes 1973–present
Month	Jan	Feb	Mar	Apr	May	Jun	Jul	Aug	Sep	Oct	Nov	Dec	Year
Record high humidex	−1.8	−3.3	2.6	4.0	15.0	30.5	34.3	32.6	26.2	19.1	1.9	−0.4	34.3
Record high °C (°F)	−1.5 (29.3)	−1.5 (29.3)	3.5 (38.3)	4.0 (39.2)	21.3 (70.3)	30.8 (87.4)	33.9 (93.0)	30.0 (86.0)	23.0 (73.4)	18.1 (64.6)	2.1 (35.8)	−0.1 (31.8)	33.9 (93.0)
Mean daily maximum °C (°F)	−24.4 (−11.9)	−24.2 (−11.6)	−18.1 (−0.6)	−9.4 (15.1)	−1.1 (30.0)	8.3 (46.9)	15.2 (59.4)	14.1 (57.4)	8.0 (46.4)	−0.4 (31.3)	−11.0 (12.2)	−19.4 (−2.9)	−5.2 (22.6)
Daily mean °C (°F)	−28.2 (−18.8)	−28.1 (−18.6)	−22.8 (−9.0)	−14.2 (6.4)	−4.3 (24.3)	4.8 (40.6)	11.2 (52.2)	10.7 (51.3)	5.2 (41.4)	−2.9 (26.8)	−15.0 (5.0)	−23.2 (−9.8)	−8.9 (16.0)
Mean daily minimum °C (°F)	−31.9 (−25.4)	−32.0 (−25.6)	−27.4 (−17.3)	−18.7 (−1.7)	−7.3 (18.9)	1.3 (34.3)	7.1 (44.8)	7.3 (45.1)	2.4 (36.3)	−5.5 (22.1)	−19.0 (−2.2)	−27.0 (−16.6)	−12.6 (9.3)
Record low °C (°F)	−48.3 (−54.9)	−47.0 (−52.6)	−41.5 (−42.7)	−36.7 (−34.1)	−26.7 (−16.1)	−11.0 (12.2)	−4.0 (24.8)	−0.6 (30.9)	−8.3 (17.1)	−26.0 (−14.8)	−34.6 (−30.3)	−42.5 (−44.5)	−48.3 (−54.9)
Record low wind chill	−62.7	−64.7	−62.4	−49.5	−35.7	−19.1	0.0	0.0	−14.0	−37.2	−51.6	−59.3	−64.7
Average precipitation mm (inches)	12.4 (0.49)	10.9 (0.43)	16.3 (0.64)	19.4 (0.76)	19.2 (0.76)	30.0 (1.18)	42.0 (1.65)	60.1 (2.37)	47.3 (1.86)	27.4 (1.08)	19.6 (0.77)	13.4 (0.53)	318.0 (12.52)
Average rainfall mm (inches)	0.0 (0.0)	0.0 (0.0)	0.1 (0.00)	0.5 (0.02)	6.7 (0.26)	25.7 (1.01)	38.3 (1.51)	61.3 (2.41)	43.5 (1.71)	9.2 (0.36)	0.0 (0.0)	0.0 (0.0)	185.2 (7.29)
Average snowfall cm (inches)	7.4 (2.9)	4.9 (1.9)	9.2 (3.6)	10.1 (4.0)	11.7 (4.6)	1.1 (0.4)	0.0 (0.0)	0.0 (0.0)	3.4 (1.3)	12.5 (4.9)	12.1 (4.8)	9.0 (3.5)	81.4 (32.0)
Average precipitation days (≥ 0.2 mm)	10.7	10.1	11.2	11.3	9.8	10.3	11.0	16.6	14.8	13.0	11.6	11.1	141.5
Average rainy days (≥ 0.2 mm)	0.0	0.0	0.1	0.33	2.4	8.1	10.1	15.4	12.2	3.5	0.0	0.0	52.1
Average snowy days (≥ 0.2 cm)	6.0	5.5	7.7	6.6	5.2	0.6	0.0	0.0	1.2	8.1	9.9	6.9	57.7
Average relative humidity (%) (at 1500 LST)	74.2	73.7	77.5	82.2	84.5	77.1	72.3	75.6	76.2	84.9	83.4	78.1	78.3
Source: Environment and Climate Change Canada (May maximum)

== Notable people ==
- Susan Aglukark
- Vinnie Karetak
- Nancy Karetak-Lindell
- Peter Kritaqliluk
- John Main, current premier of Nunavut since 2025
- Andy Miki
- John Pangnark

== See also ==
- List of municipalities in Nunavut
- Kuugaarjuk Migratory Bird Sanctuary
- Arvia'juaq and Qikiqtaarjuk National Historic Site
- Arviat Airport
