= Thelon Wildlife Sanctuary =

Wildlife refuge in Canada

- IUCN category Ib (wilderness area)
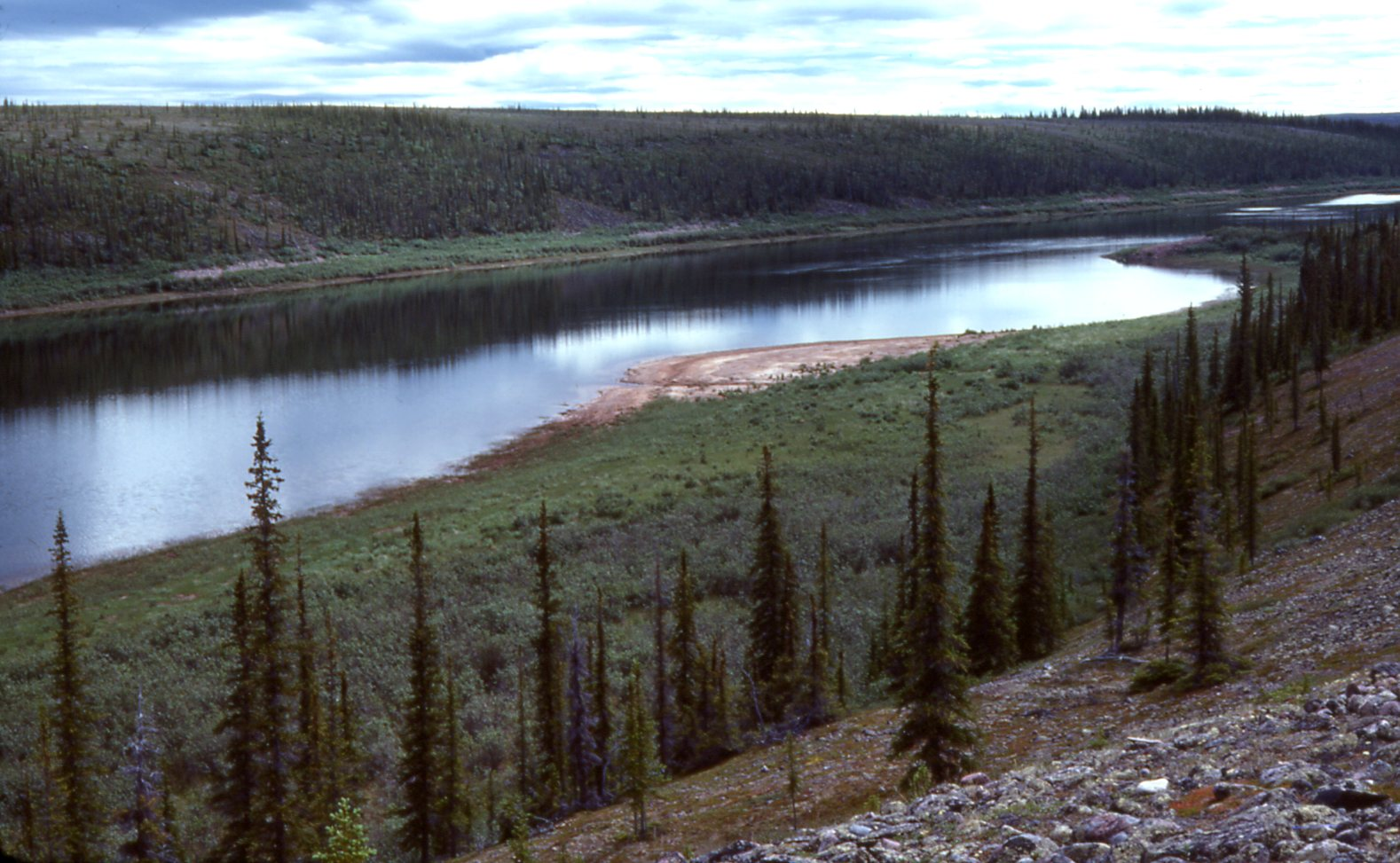
- The "oasis" section of the Thelon River, below Warden's Grove.
- Interactive map of Thelon Wildlife Sanctuary
- Location: Northwest Territories and Nunavut, Canada
- Coordinates: 64°49′59″N 102°10′00″W
- Area: 52,000 square kilometres (20,077 sq mi)
- Established: 1927
- Governing body: Nunavut Parks
- Website: nunavutparks.com/parks-special-places/thelon-wildlife-sanctuary/

The Thelon Wildlife Sanctuary is the largest wildlife refuge in Canada. At 52,000 square kilometres (20,077 sq mi), it is over twice the area of Belgium. It is located in northern Canada's Arctic region, north of the tree line, straddling the Northwest Territories and Nunavut, halfway between Baker Lake and Yellowknife, and bordered on the north between the Baillie River on the west and the Consul River at the east by the Back River. It is the namesake of the Thelon River, whose river valley is a biologically diverse boreal forest, leading to its classification as a "Biological Site of Universal Importance" by the International Biological Program in the 1960s.

== History ==
Established in 1927 as the Thelon Game Sanctuary to conserve muskox populations, its original size was 39,000 square kilometres (15,000 sq mi). John Hornby and James Charles Critchell-Bullock lived in and traversed the region and surrounding areas during 1923, and in a report afterwards recommended that the area be created as a sanctuary.

Hornby later would visit again in 1926 and starve to death in the area, with establishment as a sanctuary happening within a year afterwards. It was expanded in 1956 to its present size, and is home to the most northerly known moose population above the tree line. In addition, the wildlife sanctuary is home to barren-ground caribou (Beverly and Bathurst herds), Hudson Bay wolf, Arctic fox, wolverine, Arctic squirrel (sicsic), barren ground grizzly bear and waterfowl.

The "Thelon Oasis" is a section of the wildlife sanctuary along the Thelon River valley between Warden Grove (the Thelon's confluence with Hanbury River) and Hornby Point. Even though it is north of the Arctic tree line, the area supports thick white spruce tree groves, raspberry, currant, and columbine plants, along with tall alluvial dwarf willow thickets and tag alder. Scientists believe the contributors to this unusual proliferation of plants more common to subarctic areas include favorable fine-textured soils and climatic oasis effect, higher summer temperatures due to northward elevation fall and the absence of large lakes.

=== Inuit history ===
The wildlife sanctuary is also the ancestral home of Akilinirmiut, Inuit of the Akiliniq, a hilly area by the shores of Beverly Lake (Tipjalik). While there are many lakes within the Thelon Wildlife Sanctuary, Beverly Lake is notable as the widening of the Thelon River at its northeastern border within the wildlife sanctuary, and the end of the spruce tree groves.

The wildlife sanctuary is a hunting free zone with support from the Inuit of Baker Lake, barring any hunting of the many species present which are otherwise considered game.

== Videography ==
- LaRose, John. The Place Where God Began The Thelon Wildlife Sanctuary, a Northern Oasis. [Ottawa, Ont.]: Summerhill Entertainment, 2000.
