= John Hornby =

English explorer (1880–1927)

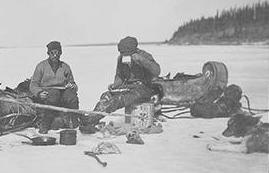
John Hornby and Norman Robinson and their dogs stop for tea on a frozen river.

John Hornby (1880–1927) was an English explorer, best known for his expeditions in the Arctic region of northern Canada, notably in the "Barren Lands" in the Northwest Territories of Canada.

== Biography ==
Hornby was born to a wealthy family in England; his father, A. N. Hornby, twice captained England in Test cricket. John migrated to Canada in 1904. Hornby's first trip to the Arctic was to the Great Bear Lake region in 1908 and he developed a strong fascination with the Canadian Arctic wilderness. Apart from occasional trips to Edmonton and service in World War I, Hornby spent the rest of his life in Canada's wilderness.

Hornby enlisted in the 19th Alberta Dragoons to fight during World War I, where he met Norman Lubbock Robinson, who would later work with him in Canada's north. Robinson's journals describe their work together, and Robinson took photos of Hornby on some of their wilderness excursions. Hornby transferred to the British Army, where he was commissioned. He only served until 1917, when his wounds lead to his retirement.

He became known as the "hermit of the north" for his efforts to live off the land with limited supplies. In 1923, Hornby teamed up with the Englishman James Charles Critchell Bullock (1898-1953) in efforts to spend an entire year in the Arctic near Hudson Bay living off the land without supplies except for weapons. The pair barely survived and Critchell Bullock's diaries formed the basis of Malcolm Waldron's book Snow Man: John Hornby in the Barren Lands, first published in 1931. Findings in an archive in England revealed letters that Bullock compiled into a manuscript to tell the tale from his own perspective. His manuscript was the base for the book Letters from The Barren Lands, published in 2020.

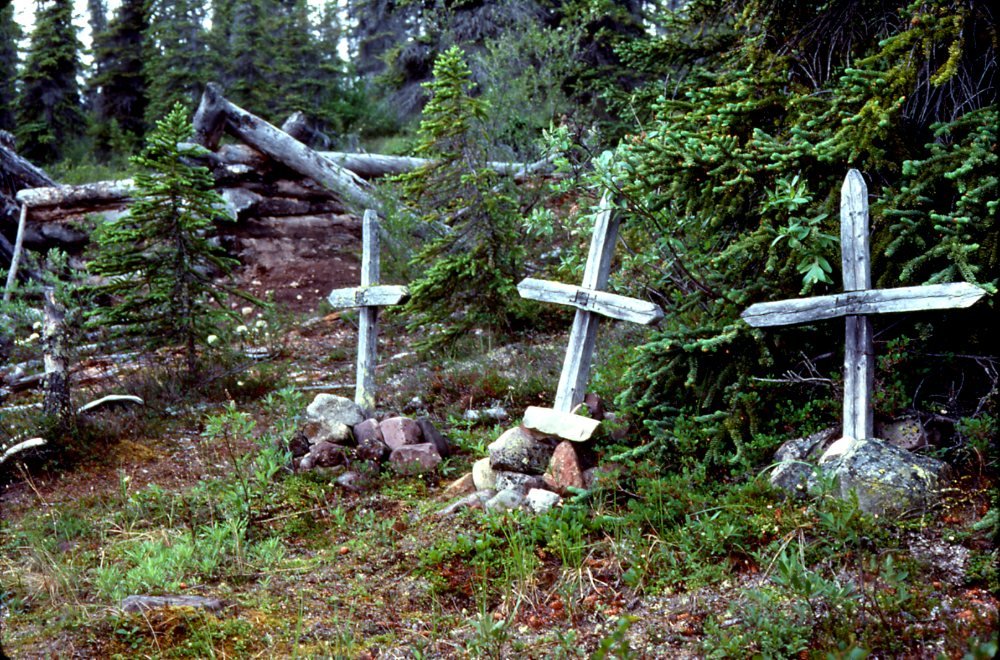
John Hornby's cabin on the Thelon River as it appeared in 1978

In 1926, Hornby tried to spend a year in a spot by the Thelon River with his 18-year-old cousin Edgar Christian and another young man, Harold Adlard. Unfortunately, the trio missed the caribou migration southward and therefore lacked sufficient food to survive the winter. Hornby died of starvation along with his companions in 1927. The graves of the three men can be found by the Thelon River near Hornby Point.

Hornby recommended in a report following his expedition with Critchell Bullock that the areas near the Thelon and Hanbury Rivers be created as a wildlife sanctuary. The Thelon Game Sanctuary was established in 1927, and renamed Thelon Wildlife Sanctuary in 1956. This area remains the heart of the largest area of wilderness in North America. The publication of Waldron's book proved successful and sparked further interest in the Northern wilderness.
