= James Charles Critchell-Bullock =

British soldier and explorer (1898–1953)

James Charles Critchell Bullock (6 September 1898 – 31 March 1953) was best known for his diaries and photographs of an expedition with John Hornby across the Barren Grounds of Canada's Northwest Territories.

== Early life ==
Bullock was born at 81 East Street, Chichester, Sussex, England on 6 September 1898, the oldest son of James Tayler Bullock.

He was educated at Cliff House Preparatory School in Southbourne followed by Sherborne School in Dorset from 1913 to 1916. He sat and passed the Royal Military College entrance exam with the option to go to a cadet college in India rather than Sandhurst.

== Military career ==
The Indian Cadet colleges, unlike Sandhurst, were a six-month course with mandatory language training. The cadet would qualify for a regular IA commission at the end of training. In 1916 he attended the Cadet College, Quetta, from where he was commissioned a second lieutenant on the Unattached List for the Indian Army on 30 January 1917.

He was subsequently appointed to the Indian Army on 14 February 1917 and appointed to the 18th King George's Own Lancers which he joined in France in May 1917.

During the First World War, he served in the Fifth Cavalry Division in France and Belgium and in the Desert Mounted Corps in Palestine and Syria. Bullock was the official cinematographer for General Allenby's arrival in Aleppo.

He was an athletic man of 6 feet, 2 inches who not only won boxing competitions at Sherborne School, but later also boxed for the Cavalry Corps. Hunting and photo expeditions led him along the upper Nile and to Kurdistan.

After two years in hospital with injuries and various tropical diseases, he retired from the Indian Army, receiving a gratuity, with the rank of Captain in July 1923.

== Canada ==
Later that year "in search of health" he went to Canada, where he met John Hornby with whom he undertook an expedition into and across Canada's Barren Lands. His diaries from that trip were the base of two books: Snow Man: John Hornby in the Barren Lands (1931) by Malcom Waldron and Letters from the Barren Lands (2020).

== Later life ==
In 1950, Bullock left England with his family to live in Kenya where he committed suicide on 31 March 1953 and was buried at the City Park Cemetery of Nairobi, Section 11, Lot 95.
