= Chesterfield Inlet =

Inlet of Hudson Bay, Canada

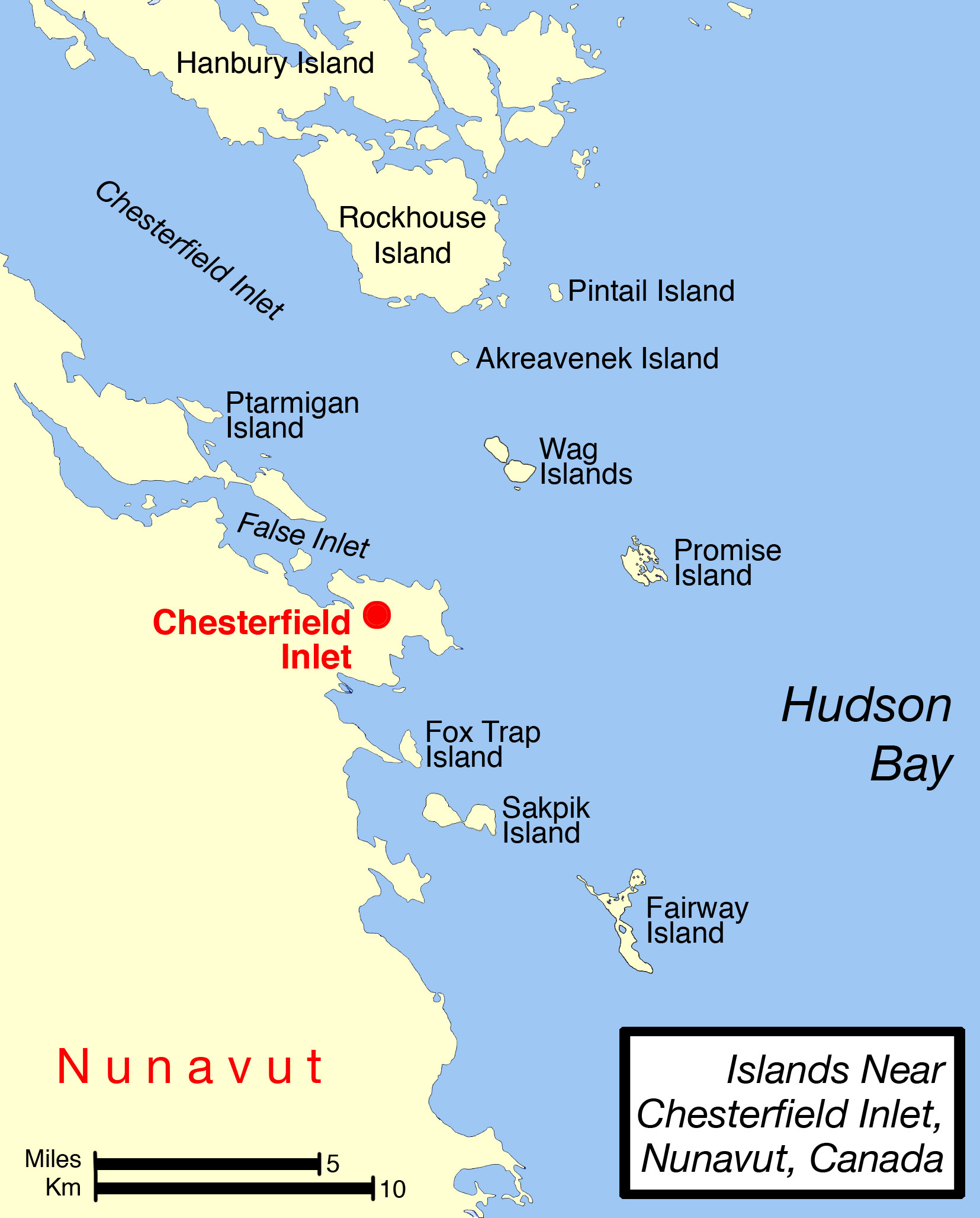
- Map of Chesterfield Inlet area.

- Location within Nunavut Location within Canada
- Location: Hudson Bay
- Coordinates: 63°32′24″N 091°04′48″W
- River sources: Thelon River
- Basin countries: Canada
- Settlements: Chesterfield Inlet, Nunavut

Chesterfield Inlet (Inuit: Igluligaarjuk) is an inlet in Kivalliq Region, Nunavut, Canada. It is an arm of northwestern Hudson Bay, and the end point of the Thelon River after its passage through Baker Lake. Cross Bay, a large widening of the inlet, occurs 30 kilometres (19 mi) east of Baker Lake. There are several islands located within the inlet.

The first European here may have been William Moor in 1747 who sent boat parties about 60 miles up the inlet. In 1762 William Christopher followed the whole inlet to Baker Lake.

The Inuit hamlet of the same name, Chesterfield Inlet, is situated near the waterway's mouth. In previous times, the area was home to Aivilingmiut and Qaernermiut.
