= Kivalliq Region =

Kivalliq ᑭᕙᓪᓕᖅ (Inuktitut)
- Region
- Kivalliq Region
- Communities of the Kivalliq

- Location in Nunavut
- Country: Canada
- Territory: Nunavut
- Regional centre: Rankin Inlet

Area (2021)
  - Total: 434,331.16 km^{2} (167,696.20 sq mi)

Population
  - Total: 11,045
  - Density: 0.025430/km^{2} (0.065863/sq mi)

The Kivalliq Region (/kɪˈvælɪk/; Inuktitut: ᑭᕙᓪᓕᖅ) is an administrative region of Nunavut, Canada. It consists of the portion of the mainland to the west of Hudson Bay together with Southampton Island and Coats Island. The regional centre is Rankin Inlet. The population was 11,045 in the 2021 Canadian census, an increase of 6.1% from the 2016 census.

Before 1999, the Kivalliq Region existed under slightly different boundaries as Keewatin Region, Northwest Territories. Although the Kivalliq name became official in 1999, Statistics Canada continued to refer to the area as the Keewatin Region in publications such as the Census until 2021. Most references to the area as "Keewatin" have generally been phased out by Nunavut-based bodies, as that name was originally rooted in a region of northwestern Ontario derived from a Cree dialect, and only saw application onto Inuit-inhabited lands because of the boundaries of the now-defunct District of Keewatin.

== Demographics ==
In the 2021 Canadian census conducted by Statistics Canada, the Kivalliq Region had a population of 11,045 living in 2,719 of its 3,193 total private dwellings, a change of 6.1% from its 2016 population of 10,413. With a land area of 434,331.16 km^{2} (167,696.20 sq mi), it had a population density of 0.0/km^{2} (0.1/sq mi) in 2021.

== Communities ==
- Hamlets and population
  - Arviat (2,864)
  - Baker Lake (2,061)
  - Chesterfield Inlet (397)
  - Coral Harbour (1,035)
  - Naujaat (1,225)
  - Rankin Inlet (2,975)
  - Whale Cove (470)
- Former
  - Cape Fullerton
  - Ennadai
  - Maguse River
  - Padlei
  - Tavani
  - Wager Bay

The remainder of the region is referred to as Kivalliq, Unorganized by Statistics Canada.

== People ==
- Caribou Inuit
  - Ahiarmiut
  - Asiagmiut
  - Harvaqtuurmiut
  - Utkuhiksalik

== Geology ==
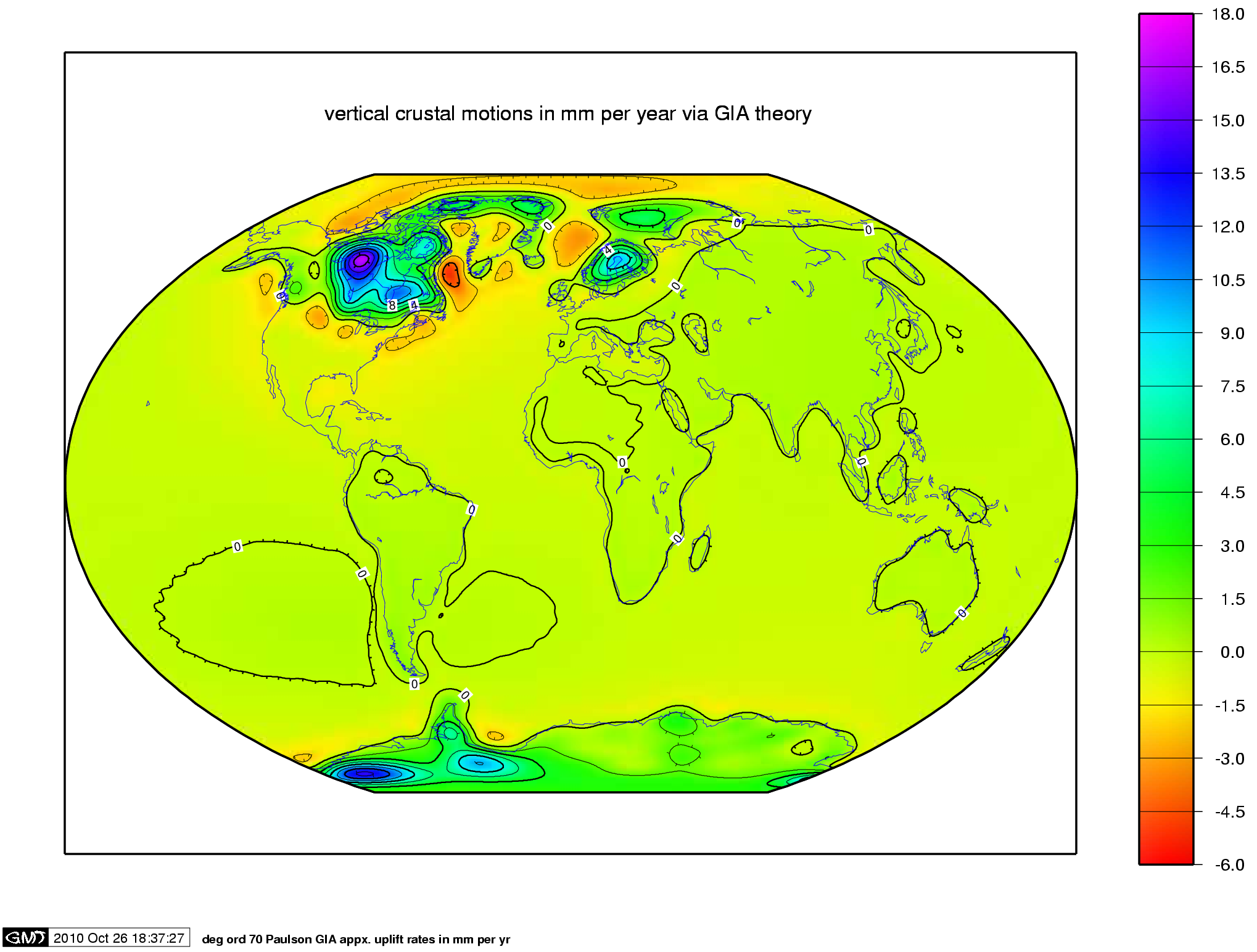
Map of post-glacial rebound

The Kivalliq Region is experiencing the world's highest rate of post-glacial rebound (as much as 17 mm (0.67 in) per year).

== Climate ==
The Kivalliq Region has a subarctic climate (Köppen climate classification Dfc) and a tundra climate (ET). However, it is almost entirely above the tree line. Temperatures stay below freezing from late September to early June, and peak at around 10 °C (50 °F) in July. Days are much longer in summer than in winter.

Climate data for Arviat (Arviat Airport) WMO ID: 71174; coordinates 61°05′38″N 94°04′18″W; elevation: 10.4 m (34 ft); 1991–2020 normals, (Note: Climate data 1991–2020 is a composite recorded at Arviat A; Climate ID: 2300MKF; coordinates 61°06′N 94°04′W; elevation: 10.4 m (34 ft), Arviat Climate; WMO ID: 71322; coordinates 61°06′N 94°04′W; elevation: 9.8 m (32 ft), and Arviat AWOS; Climate ID: 2300426; coordinates 61°06′N 94°04′W; elevation: 10.4 m (34 ft)) extremes 1973–present
Month	Jan	Feb	Mar	Apr	May	Jun	Jul	Aug	Sep	Oct	Nov	Dec	Year
Record high humidex	−1.8	−3.3	2.6	4.0	15.0	30.5	34.3	32.6	26.2	19.1	1.9	−0.4	34.3
Record high °C (°F)	−1.5 (29.3)	−1.5 (29.3)	3.5 (38.3)	4.0 (39.2)	21.3 (70.3)	30.8 (87.4)	33.9 (93.0)	30.0 (86.0)	23.0 (73.4)	18.1 (64.6)	2.1 (35.8)	−0.1 (31.8)	33.9 (93.0)
Mean daily maximum °C (°F)	−24.4 (−11.9)	−24.2 (−11.6)	−18.1 (−0.6)	−9.4 (15.1)	−1.1 (30.0)	8.3 (46.9)	15.2 (59.4)	14.1 (57.4)	8.0 (46.4)	−0.4 (31.3)	−11.0 (12.2)	−19.4 (−2.9)	−5.2 (22.6)
Daily mean °C (°F)	−28.2 (−18.8)	−28.1 (−18.6)	−22.8 (−9.0)	−14.2 (6.4)	−4.3 (24.3)	4.8 (40.6)	11.2 (52.2)	10.7 (51.3)	5.2 (41.4)	−2.9 (26.8)	−15.0 (5.0)	−23.2 (−9.8)	−8.9 (16.0)
Mean daily minimum °C (°F)	−31.9 (−25.4)	−32.0 (−25.6)	−27.4 (−17.3)	−18.7 (−1.7)	−7.3 (18.9)	1.3 (34.3)	7.1 (44.8)	7.3 (45.1)	2.4 (36.3)	−5.5 (22.1)	−19.0 (−2.2)	−27.0 (−16.6)	−12.6 (9.3)
Record low °C (°F)	−48.3 (−54.9)	−47.0 (−52.6)	−41.5 (−42.7)	−36.7 (−34.1)	−26.7 (−16.1)	−11.0 (12.2)	−4.0 (24.8)	−0.6 (30.9)	−8.3 (17.1)	−26.0 (−14.8)	−34.6 (−30.3)	−42.5 (−44.5)	−48.3 (−54.9)
Record low wind chill	−62.7	−64.7	−62.4	−49.5	−35.7	−19.1	0.0	0.0	−14.0	−37.2	−51.6	−59.3	−64.7
Average precipitation mm (inches)	12.4 (0.49)	10.9 (0.43)	16.3 (0.64)	19.4 (0.76)	19.2 (0.76)	30.0 (1.18)	42.0 (1.65)	60.1 (2.37)	47.3 (1.86)	27.4 (1.08)	19.6 (0.77)	13.4 (0.53)	318.0 (12.52)
Average rainfall mm (inches)	0.0 (0.0)	0.0 (0.0)	0.1 (0.00)	0.5 (0.02)	6.7 (0.26)	25.7 (1.01)	38.3 (1.51)	61.3 (2.41)	43.5 (1.71)	9.2 (0.36)	0.0 (0.0)	0.0 (0.0)	185.2 (7.29)
Average snowfall cm (inches)	7.4 (2.9)	4.9 (1.9)	9.2 (3.6)	10.1 (4.0)	11.7 (4.6)	1.1 (0.4)	0.0 (0.0)	0.0 (0.0)	3.4 (1.3)	12.5 (4.9)	12.1 (4.8)	9.0 (3.5)	81.4 (32.0)
Average precipitation days (≥ 0.2 mm)	10.7	10.1	11.2	11.3	9.8	10.3	11.0	16.6	14.8	13.0	11.6	11.1	141.5
Average rainy days (≥ 0.2 mm)	0.0	0.0	0.1	0.33	2.4	8.1	10.1	15.4	12.2	3.5	0.0	0.0	52.1
Average snowy days (≥ 0.2 cm)	6.0	5.5	7.7	6.6	5.2	0.6	0.0	0.0	1.2	8.1	9.9	6.9	57.7
Average relative humidity (%) (at 1500 LST)	74.2	73.7	77.5	82.2	84.5	77.1	72.3	75.6	76.2	84.9	83.4	78.1	78.3
Source: Environment and Climate Change Canada(May maximum)

Climate data for Rankin Inlet (Rankin Inlet Airport) WMO ID: 71083; coordinates 62°49′N 92°07′W; elevation: 32.3 m (106 ft); 1991–2020 normals, extremes 1981–present
Month	Jan	Feb	Mar	Apr	May	Jun	Jul	Aug	Sep	Oct	Nov	Dec	Year
Record high humidex	−3.0	−3.6	1.1	2.5	13.4	27.5	32.2	31.8	23.4	12.7	1.4	0.8	32.2
Record high °C (°F)	−2.5 (27.5)	−3.4 (25.9)	1.3 (34.3)	3.4 (38.1)	14.1 (57.4)	26.8 (80.2)	28.9 (84.0)	30.5 (86.9)	21.0 (69.8)	13.3 (55.9)	1.5 (34.7)	0.9 (33.6)	30.5 (86.9)
Mean daily maximum °C (°F)	−26.6 (−15.9)	−25.8 (−14.4)	−20.3 (−4.5)	−11.1 (12.0)	−2.2 (28.0)	8.4 (47.1)	15.2 (59.4)	13.5 (56.3)	6.7 (44.1)	−1.4 (29.5)	−12.5 (9.5)	−20.7 (−5.3)	−6.4 (20.5)
Daily mean °C (°F)	−30.1 (−22.2)	−29.5 (−21.1)	−24.5 (−12.1)	−15.5 (4.1)	−5.5 (22.1)	4.6 (40.3)	10.9 (51.6)	10.1 (50.2)	4.2 (39.6)	−4.6 (23.7)	−17.0 (1.4)	−25.7 (−14.3)	−10.0 (14.0)
Mean daily minimum °C (°F)	−33.6 (−28.5)	−33.2 (−27.8)	−28.8 (−19.8)	−19.9 (−3.8)	−8.7 (16.3)	0.8 (33.4)	6.6 (43.9)	6.7 (44.1)	1.6 (34.9)	−6.6 (20.1)	−20.3 (−4.5)	−28.2 (−18.8)	−13.6 (7.5)
Record low °C (°F)	−46.1 (−51.0)	−49.8 (−57.6)	−43.4 (−46.1)	−36.1 (−33.0)	−24.6 (−12.3)	−9.4 (15.1)	−1.9 (28.6)	−1.4 (29.5)	−9.0 (15.8)	−27.4 (−17.3)	−36.8 (−34.2)	−43.6 (−46.5)	−49.8 (−57.6)
Record low wind chill	−66.8	−70.5	−64.4	−53.6	−37.8	−17.6	−5.3	−8.8	−18.1	−42.7	−55.3	−62.4	−70.5
Average precipitation mm (inches)	9.6 (0.38)	9.2 (0.36)	12.3 (0.48)	20.6 (0.81)	21.0 (0.83)	22.1 (0.87)	43.7 (1.72)	51.6 (2.03)	47.3 (1.86)	40.1 (1.58)	22.5 (0.89)	16.1 (0.63)	315.9 (12.44)
Average rainfall mm (inches)	0.0 (0.0)	0.0 (0.0)	0.0 (0.0)	1.1 (0.04)	7.3 (0.29)	19.6 (0.77)	43.5 (1.71)	51.6 (2.03)	44.7 (1.76)	14.7 (0.58)	0.5 (0.02)	0.1 (0.00)	183.2 (7.21)
Average snowfall cm (inches)	9.8 (3.9)	9.2 (3.6)	12.3 (4.8)	20.0 (7.9)	14.0 (5.5)	2.2 (0.9)	0.1 (0.0)	0.0 (0.0)	2.6 (1.0)	25.4 (10.0)	22.5 (8.9)	16.5 (6.5)	134.5 (53.0)
Average precipitation days (≥ 0.2 mm)	7.5	6.7	8.5	8.0	8.6	7.1	10.5	12.6	12.7	14.9	12.9	10.8	120.8
Average rainy days (≥ 0.2 mm)	0.08	0.04	0.04	0.75	2.6	6.0	10.5	12.6	10.9	4.4	0.50	0.17	48.6
Average snowy days (≥ 0.2 cm)	7.6	6.8	8.5	7.7	6.9	1.5	0.04	0.04	2.7	12.3	12.9	10.8	77.8
Average relative humidity (%) (at 1500 LST)	68.2	68.7	71.9	78.1	81.0	70.6	65.7	71.2	74.6	84.2	79.2	72.4	73.8
Source: Environment and Climate Change Canada Canadian Climate Normals 1991–2020

== Protected areas ==
- Arvia'juaq and Qikiqtaarjuk National Historic Site
- Qaqsauqtuuq Migratory Bird Sanctuary
- Fall Caribou Crossing National Historic Site
- Ikkattuaq Migratory Bird Sanctuary
- Iqalugaarjuup Nunanga Territorial Park
- Inuujarvik Territorial Park
- Kuugaarjuk Migratory Bird Sanctuary
- Thelon Wildlife Sanctuary
- Ukkusiksalik National Park
