= List of lakes of Nunavut =

This is an incomplete list of lakes of Nunavut, a territory of Canada.

== Larger lake statistics ==

The total area of a lake includes the area of islands. Lakes lying across provincial boundaries are listed in the province with the greater lake area.

Nunavut lakes larger than 400 km^{2} (150 sq mi)
Lake	Area (including islands)	Altitude	Depth max.	Volume
Nettilling Lake	5,542 km^{2} (2,140 sq mi)	30 m (98 ft)	132 m (433 ft)	
Dubawnt Lake	3,833 km^{2} (1,480 sq mi)	236 m (774 ft)		
Amadjuak Lake	3,115 km^{2} (1,203 sq mi)	113 m (371 ft)		
Nueltin Lake	2,279 km^{2} (880 sq mi)	278 m (912 ft)		
Baker Lake	1,887 km^{2} (729 sq mi)	2 m (6.6 ft)		
Yathkyed Lake	1,449 km^{2} (559 sq mi)	140 m (460 ft)		
Aberdeen Lake	1,100 km^{2} (420 sq mi)	80 m (260 ft)		
Napaktulik Lake	1,080 km^{2} (420 sq mi)	381 m (1,250 ft)		
Garry Lake	976 km^{2} (377 sq mi)	148 m (486 ft)		
Contwoyto Lake	957 km^{2} (369 sq mi)	564 m (1,850 ft)		
Ennadai Lake	681 km^{2} (263 sq mi)	311 m (1,020 ft)		
Tulemalu Lake	668 km^{2} (258 sq mi)	279 m (915 ft)		
Kamilukuak Lake	638 km^{2} (246 sq mi)	266 m (873 ft)		
Kaminak Lake	600 km^{2} (230 sq mi)	53 m (174 ft)		
Ferguson Lake	588 km^{2} (227 sq mi)	11 m (36 ft)		
Tebesjuak Lake	575 km^{2} (222 sq mi)	146 m (479 ft)		
Qamanirjuaq Lake	549 km^{2} (212 sq mi)	92 m (302 ft)		
Lake Hazen	542 km^{2} (209 sq mi)	158 m (518 ft)		
Princess Mary Lake	524 km^{2} (202 sq mi)	116 m (381 ft)		
South Henik Lake	513 km^{2} (198 sq mi)	184 m (604 ft)		
Angikuni Lake	510 km^{2} (200 sq mi)	257 m (843 ft)		
Hall Lake	491 km^{2} (190 sq mi)	6 m (20 ft)		
Tehek Lake	481 km^{2} (186 sq mi)	133 m (436 ft)		
Mallery Lake	479 km^{2} (185 sq mi)	158 m (518 ft)		
MacAlpine Lake	447 km^{2} (173 sq mi)	176 m (577 ft)		
Bluenose Lake	401 km^{2} (155 sq mi)	557 m (1,827 ft)		

== List of lakes ==
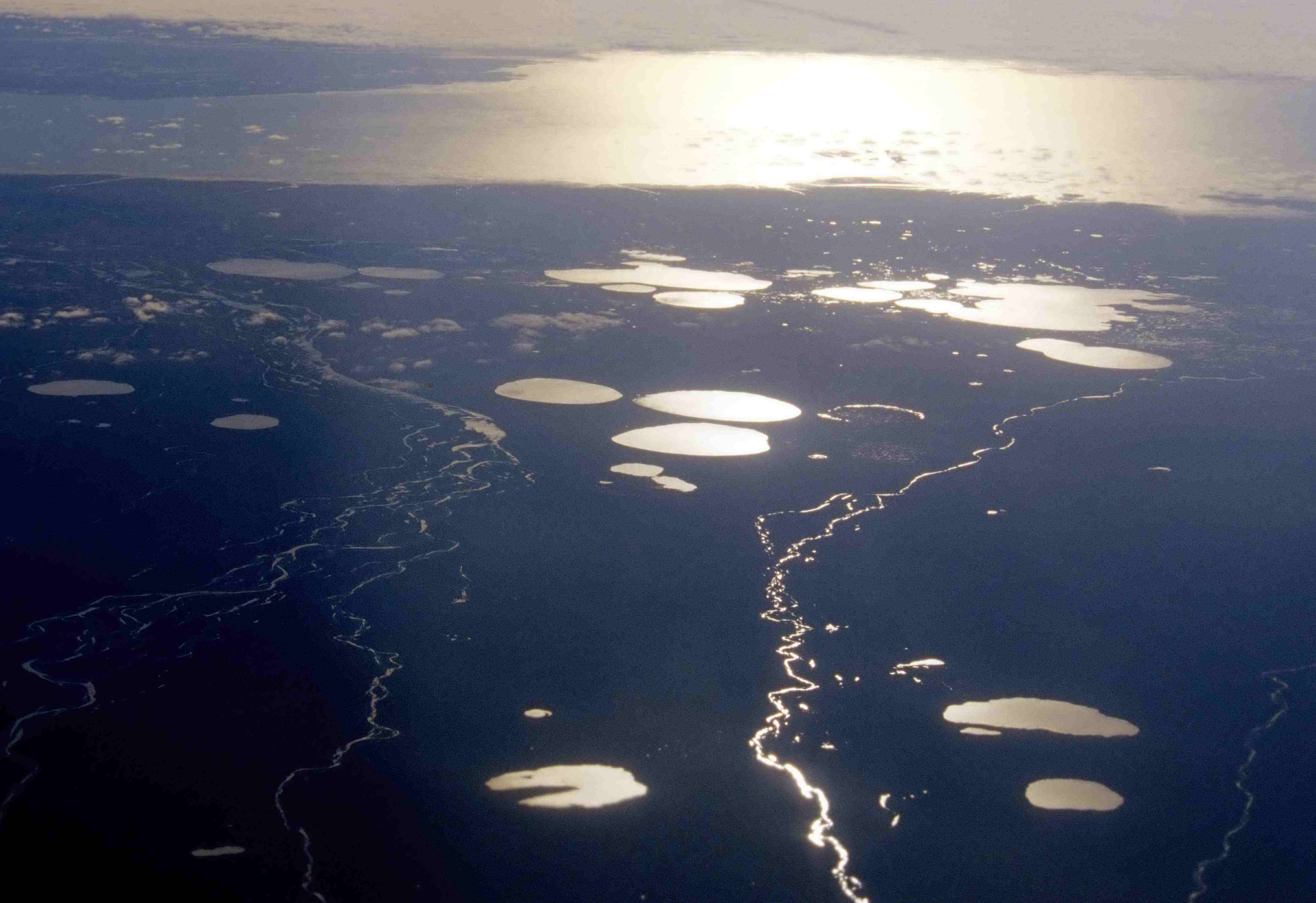
Great Koukdjuak Plains and Nettilling Lake

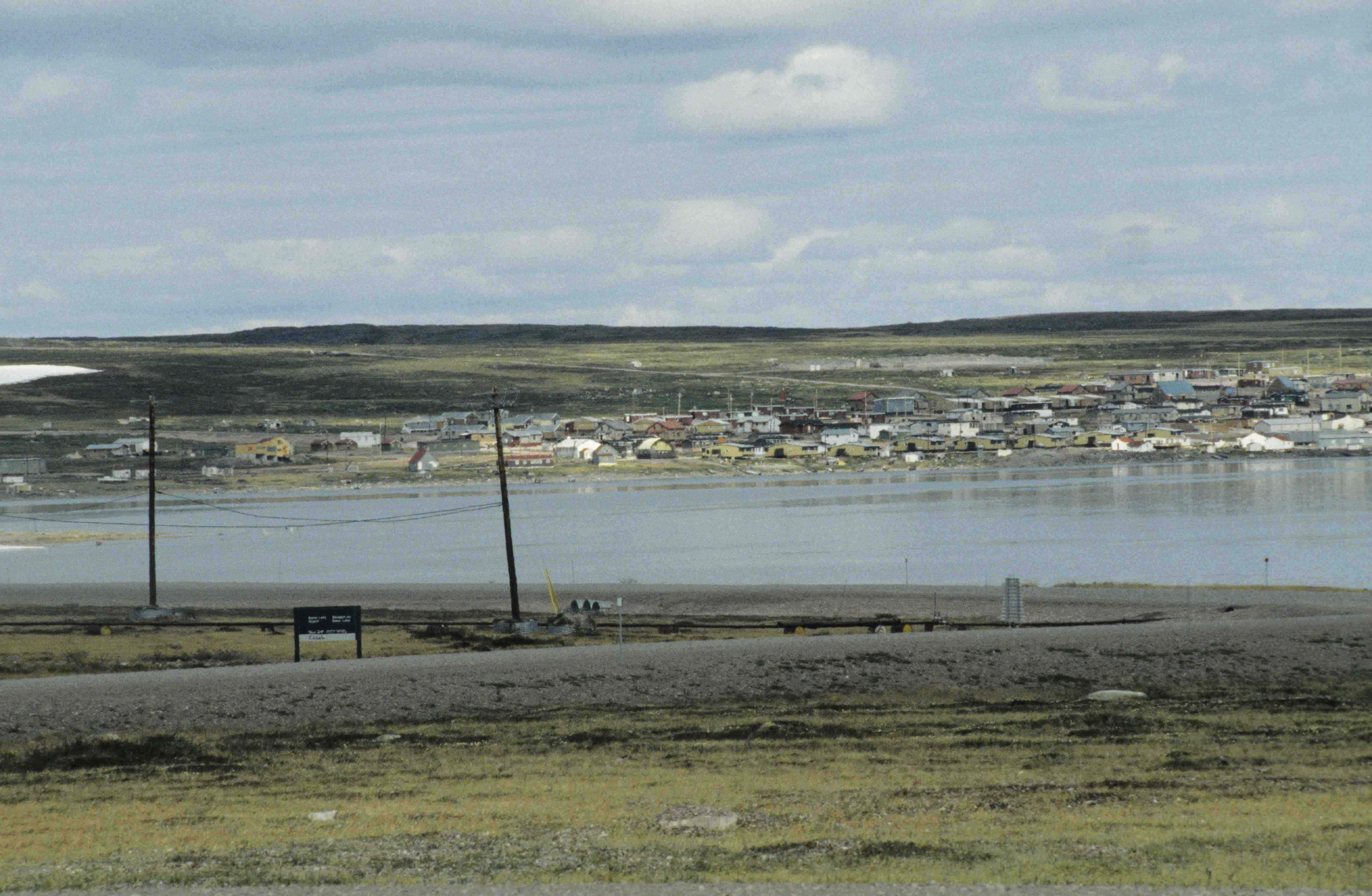
Baker Lake on the west end of Baker Lake

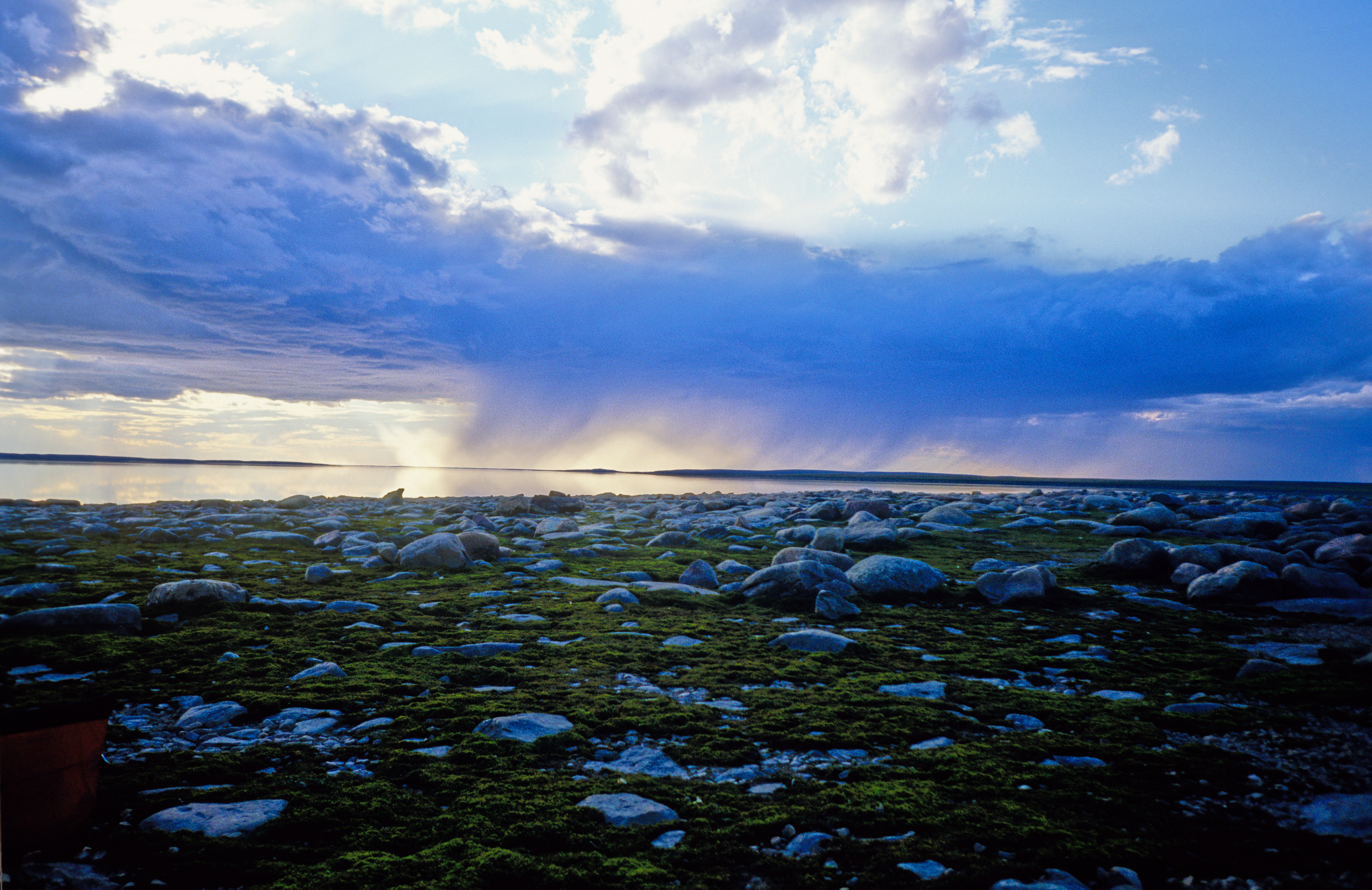
Garry Lake

- Aberdeen Lake
- Amadjuak Lake
- Angikuni Lake
- Baker Lake
- Bluenose Lake
- Contwoyto Lake
- Dubawnt Lake
- Ennadai Lake
- Ferguson Lake
- Ferguson Lake
- Garry Lake
- Hall Lake
- Lake Hazen
- Henik Lake
  - North Henik Lake
  - South Henik Lake
- Kamilukuak Lake
- Kaminak Lake
- Kasba Lake in the Northwest Territories and Nunavut
- MacAlpine Lake
- Maguse Lake
- Mallery Lake
- Minnguq
- Ktulik Lake
- Nettilling Lake
- Nueltin Lake in Manitoba and Nunavut
- Princess Mary Lake
- Qamanirjuaq Lake
- Tebesjuak Lake
- Tehek Lake
- Tulemalu Lake
- Yathkyed Lake

== See also ==
- List of lakes of Canada
