= Hall Lake =

Hall Lake or Lake Hall may refer to:

- Hall Lake (Glass Township, Kenora District), Ontario
- Hall Lake (Gravel River, Thunder Bay District), Ontario
- Hall Lake (Hall Creek, Kenora District), Ontario
- Hall Lake (Cochrane District), Ontario
- Hall Lake (Sudbury District), Ontario
- Hall Lake (Seal Lake, Kenora District), Ontario
- Hall Lake (York Region), Ontario
- Hall Lake (Dwight Lake, Thunder Bay District), Ontario
- Hall Lake (Nunavut)
- two Hall Lakes in Arkansas County, Arkansas
- Hall Lake in Crawford County, Arkansas
- Hall Lake in Cross County, Arkansas
- Lake Hall, a lake in Florida
- Hall Lake (Clearwater County, Minnesota)
- Hall Lake (Martin County, Minnesota)
