= Qamanirjuaq Lake =

Lake in Nunavut, Canada

- Location in Nunavut
- Location: Kivalliq Region, Nunavut
- Coordinates: 62°57′N 95°46′W
- Primary inflows: Ferguson River
- Primary outflows: Ferguson River at Parker Lake South
- Basin countries: Canada
- Surface area: 549 km^{2} (212 sq mi)
- Surface elevation: 92 m (302 ft)
- Islands: several (unnamed)
- Settlements: 146 km (91 mi) S of Baker Lake; 200 km (124 mi) W of Rankin Inlet

Qamanirjuaq Lake formerly Kaminuriak Lake, pronunciation: ka-min-YOO-ree-ak; meaning: "huge lake adjoining a river at both ends", is a lake in the Kivalliq Region, Nunavut, Canada. It is the first of several named lakes on the eastward flow of the Ferguson River through the eastern barrenlands. The lake is located about 2 km (1 mi) downstream from Ferguson Lake, and adjacent upstream to Parker Lake South. The Ferguson River passes through a series of rapids before entering the western arm of Qamanirjuaq Lake.

== Geography ==
The lake is irregularly shaped with several inlets and unnamed islands, in a permafrost area of north-northwest ice flow, north of the tree line. Arctic explorer, Joseph Tyrrell, described the lake in his Geological Survey of Canada 1894 canoe expedition report:

"Kaminuriak Lake is a beautiful sheet of clear cold water lying in the till-covered plain... Where seen, the beach is in some places sandy, but more generally of large boulders, which, on the more exposed parts of the shore are arranged in a regular wall to the height of from eight to twelve feet, while in the bays they are scattered over a shallow floor of sand or till. Back from the lake the country stretches in wide treeless plains, or rises in low grassy hills, which show no signs of any underlying rock... Following the south shore of Kaminuriak Lake to its southeastern angle, the river was again reached... now a much larger stream, sixty yards wide and two feet deep."

Qamanirjuaq Lake is within the northern Hearne Domain, Western Churchill province of the Churchill Craton, northwest section of the Canadian Shield in northern Canada.

Ahimaa (Inuktitut: "are you other?" or "are you other being?"), a cave, once inhabited by an Inuk, is hollowed out of Qamanirjuaq Lake's massive cliff.

== Fauna ==
The calving grounds of the large migratory Qamanirjuaq herd of barren-ground caribou are in the area surrounding Lake Qamanirjuaq, after which they are named. The herd returns annually after travelling an inconsistent, unpredictable 800 km (500 mi) range through Manitoba/Nunavut, northeastern Saskatchewan, and southeastern Northwest Territories. The herd, a keystone species, has been safeguarded by the Beverly and Qamanirjuaq Caribou Management Board since 1982.

In the mid-1970s, a fishery was moved from Kaminak Lake (which proved to have unacceptably high levels of mercury), to Qamanirjuaq Lake which showed no elevated mercury levels. The lake is filled with lake whitefish and lake trout for commercial fishing, and is also home to Lasallia pensylvanica lichen, sphagnum, bryophytes, and a few dwarf birch.

== See also ==
- List of lakes of Nunavut
- List of lakes of Canada
