= Ferguson River (Nunavut) =

Location
- Country: Canada
- Territory: Nunavut

Physical characteristics
- Source
  - location: Ferguson Lake
- Mouth
  - location: Nevill Bay on northwestern Hudson Bay

The Ferguson River originates on the eastern bank of Ferguson Lake^{A} within the northern Hearne Domain, Western Churchill province of the Churchill craton, the northwest section of the Canadian Shield in Nunavut's Kivalliq Region.

The river was first traversed by Canadian Arctic explorer Joseph Burr Tyrrell's Geological Survey of Canada 1894 canoe expedition that included Robert Monro Ferguson, Scottish sportsman and aide-de-camp to Lord Aberdeen, Governor General of Canada. Ferguson became the namesake of the river and the lake.(Hodgins, 1994, pg. 109)

The river flows eastward through several lakes:

- Qamanirjuaq Lake ("Kaminuriak")^{B}
- Victory Lake^{C}
- O'Neil Lake^{D}
- Kaminak Lake^{E}
- Quartzite Lake^{F}
- Snug Lake^{G}
- Munro Lake^{H}
- Helika Lake^{I}
- Last Lake^{J}

Before reaching its outflow, the river passes through narrows, "The Canyon",^{K} then empties into Nevill Bay^{L} opposite Bibby Island in northwestern Hudson Bay between Rankin Inlet and Whale Cove.

Ferguson River flows through the migratory path of Barren-ground caribou. Arctic charr can be found in the river, while muskox, Hudson Bay wolves, and Arctic fox also inhabit the area.

== History ==
The river was first explored in 1894 by Joseph Burr Tyrrell and his party, who received guidance about the local lakes and rivers from area Inuit. Tyrell named the river after one of his travelling companions.

== See also ==
- List of rivers of Nunavut

== Mapping ==
- Ferguson Lake, 62°54′46″N 096°53′29″W
- Qamanirjuaq Lake, 62°56′00″N 095°43′00″W
- Victory Lake, 62°36′41″N 095°32′01″W
- O'Neil Lake, 62°28′25″N 095°18′35″W
- Kaminak Lake, 62°09′33″N 095°08′23″W
- Quartzite Lake, 62°21′58″N 094°29′54″W
- Snug Lake, 62°21′28″N 094°19′24″W
- Munro Lake, 62°23′16″N 094°10′38″W
- Helika Lake, 62°24′03″N 094°02′21″W
- Last Lake, 62°15′27″N 093°44′46″W
- The Canyon, 62°06′23″N 093°22′18″W
- Nevill Bay, 62°01′38″N 93°16′53″W
