= Kunwak River =

River in Nunavut, Canada

Coordinates: 63°40′N 097°03′W

The Kunwak River is a river of Nunavut, Canada. It flows northeast out of Tulemalu Lake and enters Tebesjuak Lake, Mallery Lake and Princess Mary Lake before turning southeast and flowing into Thirty Mile Lake on the Kazan River.

Historically the Kunwak has been inhabited by the Inuit. The Harvaqtuurmiut, a Caribou Inuit group, made their homes along the river.
