= Ferguson Lake (Kivalliq Region) =

Lake in Nunavut, Canada

- Location within Nunavut
- Location: Kivalliq Region, Nunavut
- Coordinates: 62°54′46″N 96°53′29″W
- Primary outflows: Ferguson River
- Basin countries: Canada
- Max. length: 17 mi (27 km)
- Max. width: 3 mi (4.8 km)
- Surface elevation: 114 m (374 ft)
- Islands: several
- Settlements: uninhabited

Ferguson Lake is a lake in Kivalliq Region, Nunavut, Canada. It is located 150 km (93 mi) north of the tree line, midway between Yathkyed Lake and Qamanirjuaq Lake. The lake's outflow is to the east into the Ferguson River, which flows eastward through several lakes, emptying into northwestern Hudson Bay between Rankin Inlet and Whale Cove. The closest community is Baker Lake, 160 km (99 mi) to the north.

The lake was discovered by Canadian Arctic explorer Joseph Tyrrell's Geological Survey of Canada 1894 canoe expedition that included Robert Monro Ferguson, Scottish sportsman and aide-de-camp to Lord Aberdeen, Governor General of Canada. Ferguson became the namesake of the lake and the river.(Hodgins, 1994, pg. 109)

== Geography ==
The lake has an irregular contour with deep bays, long points, grassy slopes, terraces underlain with sand and gravel, and rocky narrows. There are several rocky, gray gneiss, dark-green diorite islands, one large enough to accommodate a +1 km airstrip. A prominent area feature directly east of the lake is Uligattalik Hill 62°55′40″N 96°34′19″W.

It is within the northern Hearne Domain, Western Churchill province of the Churchill craton, the northwest section of the Canadian Shield.

== Flora ==
Dwarf birch, Labrador tea, lichen and moss predominate.

== Fauna ==
The subarctic climate and barrenlands terrain support barren-ground caribou, grizzly bear, muskoxen, Arctic hare, and Arctic fox. The lake's fish include searun Arctic char.

== Mineral exploration ==
History

In 1953, commercial area mineral exploration found copper-nickel. Further exploration in 1987 found cobalt-palladium-platinum. Starfield Resources drilled at least four holes in 1999 to a targeted anomaly.

Current decade

Commercial drilling began on the lake's east side in 2004 as part of a massive sulphide project exploration for nickel-copper-cobalt-platinum-palladium. By 2007, the Starfield commercial exploration 62°55′00″N 97°00′00″W became notable for the possibility of developing into Nunavut's largest ongoing base metal and precious metal project. Some of the research is funded by McGill University.

The Nunavut Impact Review Board was contacted in early 2007 by the Ferguson Lake Natives, and the Beverly and Qamanirjuaq Caribou Management Board (BQCMB). The Ferguson Lake Inuit, now residing in Baker Lake, Nunavut, addressed issues of concern with the Starfield Resources-Ferguson Lake Project report, requested copies of the project's 2005 and 2006 reports, and sought assurance that they be included in the planning stage of commercial mineral exploration that includes the lake's archaeological, cultural or traditional sites. The BQCMB addressed its concerns on behalf of the area's caribou population.

In March 2008, Starfield announced positive indications of rhodium:

The indications of rhodium at Ferguson Lake are significant because of the very strong price of this commodity. We very much need to evaluate our large land holding over the next two years to determine its value for further expenditures or joint venture opportunities. Nonetheless, we consider the Ferguson Lake deposit our crown jewel and it will remain our major focus. (André Douchane, President/CEO, Starfield, March 13, 2008)

The following week, on March 20, Starfield announced that its scoping study yielded positive results with anticipation of economical operations, 27% IRR, plus enough cobalt, copper, and nickel mineral resources for operations through 2030. The study includes assumptions of a Ferguson Lake open pit mine, a later underground mine, and an on-site processing plant. Additional assumptions include a slurry pipeline to Rankin Inlet, along with ship loading and port facilities there.
