= Nevill Bay =

Bay in Nunavut, Canada

- Location within Nunavut
- Location: Hudson Bay
- Coordinates: 61°59′N 93°14′W
- River sources: Ferguson River
- Ocean/sea sources: Arctic Ocean
- Basin countries: Canada
- Settlements: Uninhabited

Nevill Bay is a long and narrow waterway in the Kivalliq Region, Nunavut, Canada. It is located in northwestern Hudson Bay between Arviat (107 km (66 mi) south) and Whale Cove (40 km (25 mi) north), approximately 12 km (7.5 mi) south of Tavani.

The Ferguson River empties into the bay opposite Bibby Island.
