= Kaminak Lake =

Lake in Kivalliq Region, Nunavut, Canada

- Location in Nunavut
- Location: Kivalliq Region, Nunavut
- Coordinates: 62°8′N 95°6′W
- Primary inflows: Ferguson River
- Primary outflows: Hudson Bay
- Basin countries: Canada
- Max. length: 40 mi (64 km)
- Max. width: 1–22 mi (2–35 km)
- Surface area: 600 km^{2} (230 sq mi)
- Surface elevation: 53 m (174 ft)
- Settlements: uninhabited

Kaminak Lake (pronounced: KA-min-ak) is a lake in Kivalliq Region, Nunavut, Canada. The sub-Arctic lake is one of eleven lakes of the Ferguson River system which ultimately flow into the northwestern Hudson Bay. The abandoned outpost of Tavani is 60 mi (97 km) to the east.

== Geography ==
It is within a permafrost region of Canada, and part of the Herne Domain Western Churchill province of the Churchill craton, which is the northwest section of the Canadian Shield.

== Minerals ==
Around 1971, after reviewing 2,000 samples, the Geological Survey of Canada discovered: "an unusual and unsuspected distribution of above background mercury concentrations in natural waters". While this offered the potential for mineral explorations, it was also notable as commercial fishing occurs in Kaminak Lake. In the mid-1970s, the Kaminak Lake fishery was moved further up the Ferguson River to Qamanirjuaq ("Kaminuriak") Lake; it did not exhibit elevated mercury levels. Other prospecting and mapping studies followed and exploration companies found gold at the lake, including on an island within the lake.

== Fauna ==
Kaminak Lake is part of the barren-ground caribou migration area.

== See also ==
- List of lakes of Nunavut
- List of lakes of Canada
