= Harvaqtuurmiut =

Inuit society in Nunavut, Canada

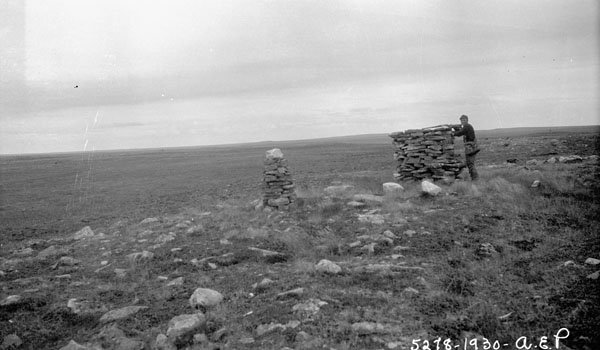
Inuit inukshuk on the lower Kazan River used during the caribou hunt.

"You must know that human beings differ. The Harvaqtormiut know many things we do not know, and we know many things they do not. Therefore you must not compare the Harvaqtormiut with us, for their knowledge is not our knowledge, as our knowledge is not theirs." (Knud Rasmussen, 1930)

—

Harvaqtuurmiut (alternate: Harvaqtormiut, or Ha'vaqtuurmiut; translation: "whirlpools aplenty people") were a Caribou Inuit society in Nunavut, Canada. Predominantly, their inland existence was along the lower Kazan River section, by Thirty Mile Lake, that they called Harvaqtuuq. In 1995, the lower Kazan River area, an important crossing area for the Kaminuriak caribou herd as well as the traditional territory and ancestral home of Harvaqtuurmiut, was designated the Fall Caribou Crossing National Historic Site.

== History ==
In the 19th and 20th centuries, Harvaqtuurmiut and others lived in the interior west of Hudson Bay. In addition to the lower Kazan River area, they also occupied areas below Yathkyed Lake, below the Kunwak River, and inland to Beverly Lake and the lower Dubawnt River. Historically, the land of the Harvaqtuurmiut was also a gathering place for people from other places because the Kazan River is a fall caribou crossing area.

Population estimates in 1918 were 186, but down to 71 in 1922. By the early 1980s, most had moved to Baker Lake.

== Culture ==
Their cultural and linguistic traditions were shared with the Ahiarmiut, Hauniqtuurmiut, Paallirmiut, and Qairnirmiut. By the 19th century, the Harvaqtuurmiut and the Qairnirmiut were known to live inland and to the north. While according to Vallee (1962), they were known to rarely visit the coast and on those occasions, they came to trade but did not hunt sea mammals, Kuoljok (1969) stated that sea mammals held some importance during the summer for the Harvaqtuurmiut.

While they engaged in the fur trade, their primary focus was the Barren-ground Caribou as they relied on it for subsistence and it determined where they built their homes. They specialized in hunting at autumn river-crossings. They used kayaks characterized as being sleek and of well made design.

The Harvaqtuurmiut society had its own traditions. Niqaptaq was a goose hunting ritual involving strings with bones ties at the ends that were spun overhead and when they wrapped around a goose's neck, the goose fell to the ground. They used moss smoke in their tents as a mosquito repellent. Dried moss, collected in the summer, was used as a fuel lighting mechanism.

Drum dances might be incorporated into asking questions of Shamans. Drum dancing movement is up to the individual and might include bending at the knee, moving in a circle, standing still, moving in a procession, moving back and forth, running, or jumping. According to Rasmussen (1927), the Harvaqtuurmiut believed in Pinga, an Inuit female spirit, who was watchful of people's conduct, rewarding and punishing them based on how they behaved.

Harvaqtuurmiut followed five seasons: Upinraqhaaq (a time of snow melt), Upinraaq (July and early August), Aujahajuq or Aujaq (mid-August to September), Ukiaqhaq or Ukiaq (October to early November), and Ukiuq (mid-November to April).
