= Ruth Annaqtuusi Tulurialik =

Canadian artist

- Born: 1934 (age 91–92); Kazan River area in Nunavut
- Known for: Graphic arts, music
- Partner: Hugh Tulurialik

Ruth Annaqtuusi Tulurialik (born 1934) is a Qaernermiut Inuk artist graphic artist and musician. She was born near the Kazan River area in Nunavut but relocated to Qamani'tuaq (Baker Lake), Nunavut with her adoptive parents when she was a few months old.

== Career ==
She has said that she was encouraged by Jessie Oonark. She began to draw in about 1965 or 1970 at the Sanavik Cooperative in Qamani'tuaq. A year later, she became a regular contributor to the annual Baker Lake print series.

Tulurialik's work is featured in the 1986 book Qikaaluktut: Images of Inuit Life, which she wrote with author David F. Pelly. In the book, she presents, in drawings and words (transcribed by Pelly), her memories of life among the Inuit as well as olden-day incidents, beliefs and fables, and even a story by her husband. She told the stories, she said, so that people down south and her own children would know them. The title refers to the "sounds of people passing by, heard but not seen" because she thought her imaginative drawings and stories were like these sounds. The drawings in the book became the basis of an exhibition of the artist's work titled The Vital Vision: Drawings By Ruth Annaqtuusi Tulurialik co-curated by Dr. Marion (Mame) Jackson and David Pelly which travelled to several public galleries across Canada in 1986-1987.

Her work is included in the collections of the National Gallery of Canada, the Portland Museum of Art, the Museum of Anthropology at the University of British Columbia, the Montreal Museum of Fine Arts, the National Museum of the American Indian, the McMichael Canadian Art Collection and the Winnipeg Art Gallery.

Tulurialik and her husband, Hugh, are also singers and musicians who have given concerts throughout the Canadian Arctic and at a benefit in New York, New York for World Environment Day.
