= Irene Avaalaaqiaq Tiktaalaaq =

Canadian artist (born 1941)

- Born: 1941 (age 84–85) north shore of Tebesjuak Lake near Baker Lake, Nunavut, Canada
- Known for: graphic artist, fabric artist, sculpture
- Spouse: David Tiktaalaaq

Irene Avaalaaqiaq Tiktaalaaq RCA (born 1941) is one of Canada's most renowned Inuit artists. Her work is rooted in her lived experience, often dealing with themes of being an orphan and Inuit stories her grandmother told her. Avaalaaqiaq Tiktaalaaq is noted for her drawings, prints, and wall hangings.

== Personal background ==
Avaalaaqiaq Tiktaalaaq was born on the north shore of Tebesjuak Lake near Baker Lake, Nunavut, Canada. Although she believes she was born in 1941, she was once told by an acquaintance that her actual year of birth was 1936. At that time in the area, the dates of births on the land were not generally recorded. Her mother, Gualittuaq, died shortly after Avaalaaqiaq was born, and her father, Itiplui, unable to care for her, so her grandparents raised her on the land in the customary Inuit style. Speaking of her childhood, Avaalaaqiaq Tiktaalaaq said:

Whenever I see my wall hangings they remind me of my life. Also I always remember my grandmother and the stories and legends she told me. When I grew up there were no other people except my grandparents. I had never seen white people. When I do sewing and make a wall hanging I do what I remember. I can see it clear as a picture. When I am looking at it, it looks like it is actually happening in those days, as it was in my life.

On August 9, 1956, she married David Tiktaalaaq in Baker Lake. They moved to Baker Lake in 1958, where Avaalaaqiaq Tiktaalaaq gave birth to one of their children.

== Artwork ==
Avaalaaqiaq Tiktaalaaq began her art career between 1969 and 1970 with small soapstone carvings, often of animals with human heads.

Her works are part of the collections at the National Gallery of Canada, the Winnipeg Art Gallery, the Baltimore Museum of Art, and the Macdonald Stewart Art Centre and the College of William and Mary in Virginia.

== Exhibitions ==
- Two Great Image Makers from Baker Lake, 1999 (with Josiah Nuilaalik)
- Works On Cloth, 2002

Institutions that have held exhibitions of her work, as cited in Judith Nasby's book Irene Avaalaaqiaq: myth and reality include:

- Agnes Etherington Art Centre, Queens University, Kingston, Ontario
- Amway Environmental Foundation Collection, Ada, Michigan
- Art Gallery of Ontario, Toronto, Ontario
- Baltimore Museum of Art, Baltimore, Maryland
- Canadian Guild of Crafts Quebec, Montreal, Quebec
- Canadian Museum of Civilization, Hull, Quebec
- Carleton University Art Gallery, Ottawa, Ontario
- CIBC Collection, Toronto, Ontario
- Confederation Centre Art Gallery and Museum, Charlottetown,
- Prince Edward Island
- Dennos Museum Center, Northwestern Michigan College, Traverse City,
- Michigan
- Heard Museum, Phoenix, Arizona
- Indian and Northern Affairs, Canada, Ottawa, Ontario
- Itsarnittakarvik: Inuit Heritage Centre, Baker Lake, Nunavut
- Kitchener-Waterloo Art Gallery, Kitchener, Ontario
- Macdonald Stewart Art Centre, Guelph, Ontario
- McMaster Museum of Art, McMaster University, Hamilton, Ontario
- McMichael Canadian Art Collection, Kleinburg, Ontario
- Mendel Art Gallery, Saskatoon, Saskatchewan
- Musee des beaux-arts de Montreal, Montreal, Quebec
- Museum of Anthropology, University of British Columbia, Vancouver,
- British Columbia
- National Gallery of Canada, Ottawa, Ontario
- Prince of Wales Northern Heritage Centre, Yellowknife, Northwest Territories
- University of Alberta, Edmonton, Alberta
- University of Delaware, Newark, Delaware
- University of Lethbridge Art Gallery, Lethbridge, Alberta
- University of New Brunswick, Fredericton, New Brunswick
- Winnipeg Art Gallery, Winnipeg, Manitoba

== Honours ==
In 1999, the University of Guelph awarded Avaalaaqiaq Tiktaalaaq an honorary doctorate of laws in recognition of her contribution to the development of Inuit art and her leadership role in the Nunavut community of Baker Lake. In her address, Avaalaaqiaq Tiktaalaaq remarked, "It makes me feel proud that my art is recognized after so many years of being an artist." Her address to the audience at the ceremony for the Ontario Agricultural College and the College of Arts was delivered in her native Inuktitut, with her friend Sally Qimmiu'naaq Webster acting as translator.

She was inducted into the Royal Canadian Academy of Arts.
