= Hood River (Nunavut) =

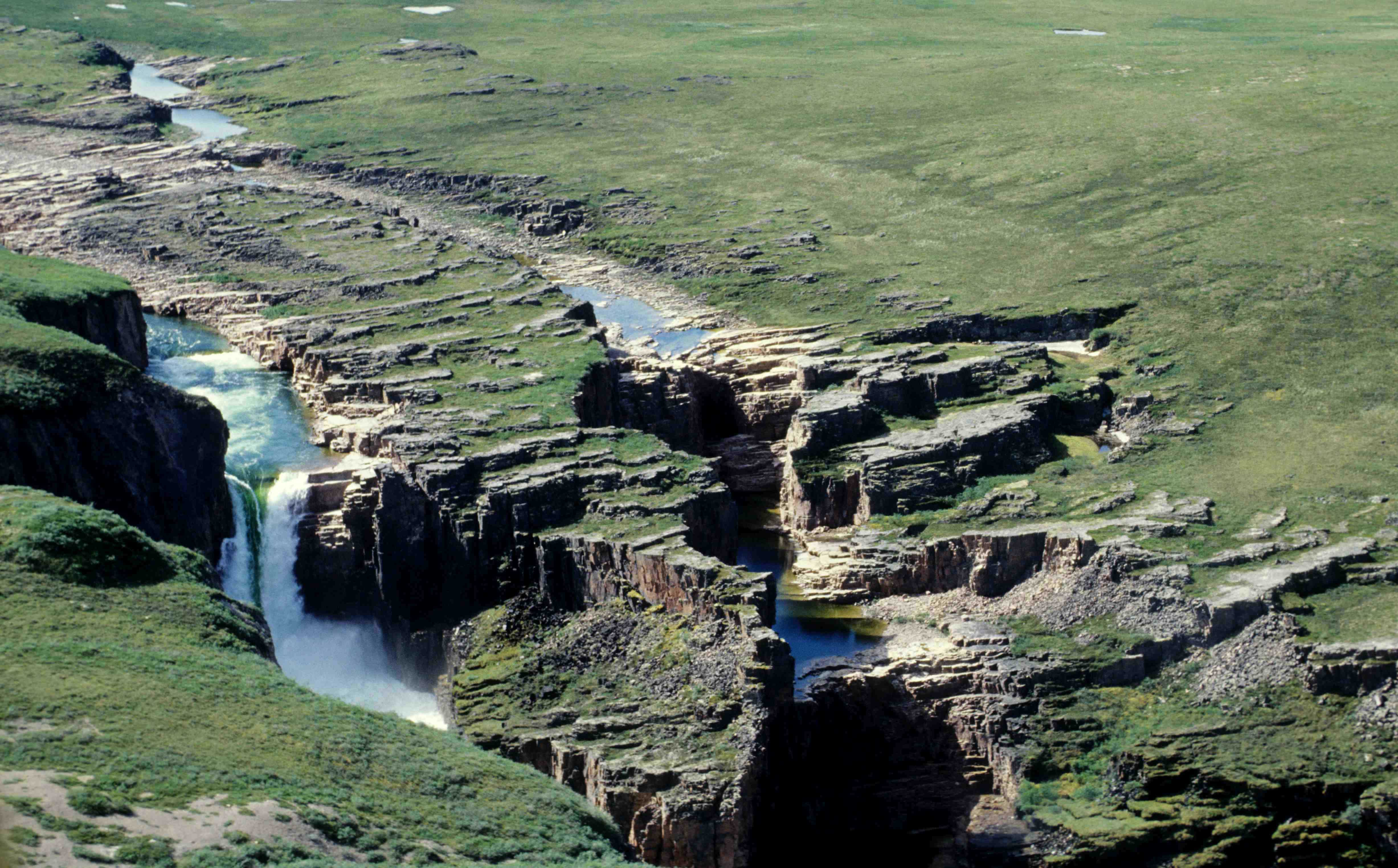
- Kattimannap Qurlua, formerly Wilberforce Falls

- Mouth of the Hood River

Location
- Country: Canada
- Territory: Nunavut

Physical characteristics
- Source
  - location: Napaktulik Lake
  - coordinates: 66°20′N 113°00′W
- Mouth
  - location: Bathurst Inlet
  - coordinates: 67°26′N 108°53′W
- Length: 400 km (250 mi)

The Hood River of Nunavut, Canada, is a 400 km (250 mi) long river draining into the Arctic Ocean from its headwaters in the interior of Canada's tundra at Napaktulik Lake, close to the Northwest Territories border. The river ends at Arctic Sound near the community of Bathurst Inlet. The river is above the Arctic Circle and tree line.

Lake trout are plentiful and can be almost a metre long. The upper lakes of the Hood can be frozen until July, and on the banks of the river, grizzlies, wolves, wolverines, and muskox are plentiful. In the short Arctic summer, canoeists braving the mighty river can see the migration of the barren-ground caribou through the area. Muskox and wolves are also common sights.

There are numerous rapids, waterfalls and glaciers along the river. Wilberforce Gorge is a steep, high gorge that runs for 3 km (1.9 mi) at almost 76 m (249 ft) deep. Kattimannap Qurlua, at the head of the gorge, is the highest waterfall north of the Arctic Circle falling 49 m (161 ft) in two 24 m (79 ft) drops.

During Sir John Franklin's first overland expedition, the Coppermine expedition, he came back up this river, after going down the Coppermine River, then east along the Arctic Coast to Point Turnagain, while searching for the Northwest Passage. The river gets its name from Lieutenant Robert Hood, who was murdered on the overland trek back to Fort Enterprise.

== See also ==
- List of rivers of Nunavut
