= Mistake Bay =

Bay in Kivalliq Region, Nunavut, Canada

- Location within Nunavut
- Location: Hudson Bay
- Coordinates: 62°09′N 92°55′W
- Ocean/sea sources: Arctic Ocean
- Basin countries: Canada
- Settlements: Tavani, Nunavut (ghost town)

Mistake Bay is a waterway in the Kivalliq Region, Nunavut, Canada. It is located in northwestern Hudson Bay by the old mining settlement and trading post of Tavani. Mistake Bay, to the south of Wilson Bay, has numerous islands and shoals.

The Saint Francois Xavier mission was founded here in 1939 or 1940 by Father Dunleavy.
