= James William Tyrrell =

Canadian geographer (1863–1945)

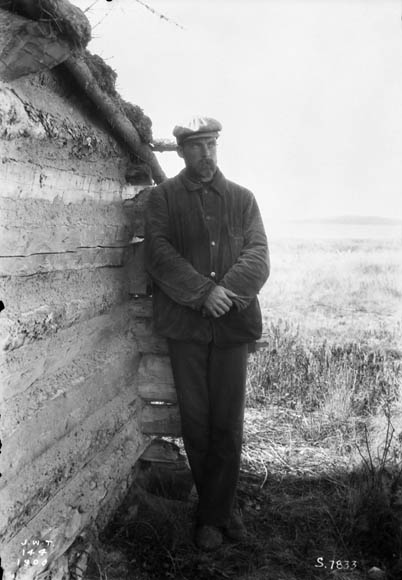
- James Tyrrell in Fort Reliance
- Born: May 10, 1863; Weston, Ontario
- Died: 1945 (aged 81–82)
- Known for: exploring Canada's largely undocumented Barrenlands

James William Tyrrell was a Canadian topologist and author. Like his older brother, Joseph Burr Tyrrell, Tyrrell went on physically demanding expeditions to Canada's sparsely settled, rugged North.

In 1898 he wrote "Central Canadian Waterways Transit System : Proposed Utilization of the Main Waterways of the Four Great Interior Basins of Canada by Adding Requisite 'divide' Railway Facilities for Improved Transit Thereon", a 14-page pamphlet.

In 1902 he wrote "Across the Sub-Arctics of Canada: A Journey of 3,200 Miles by Canoe and Snow-shoe Through the Barren Lands", based on his expedition to map the land between Great Slave Lake and Hudson's Bay. He led a team of just 9 men.

In 1905 Tyrrell conducted the first survey of the mouth of the Churchill River. Fifteen years later Churchill would become North America's only rail link to the Arctic Ocean.
