= Kattimannap Qurlua =

Waterfall on the Hood River in Nunavut, Canada

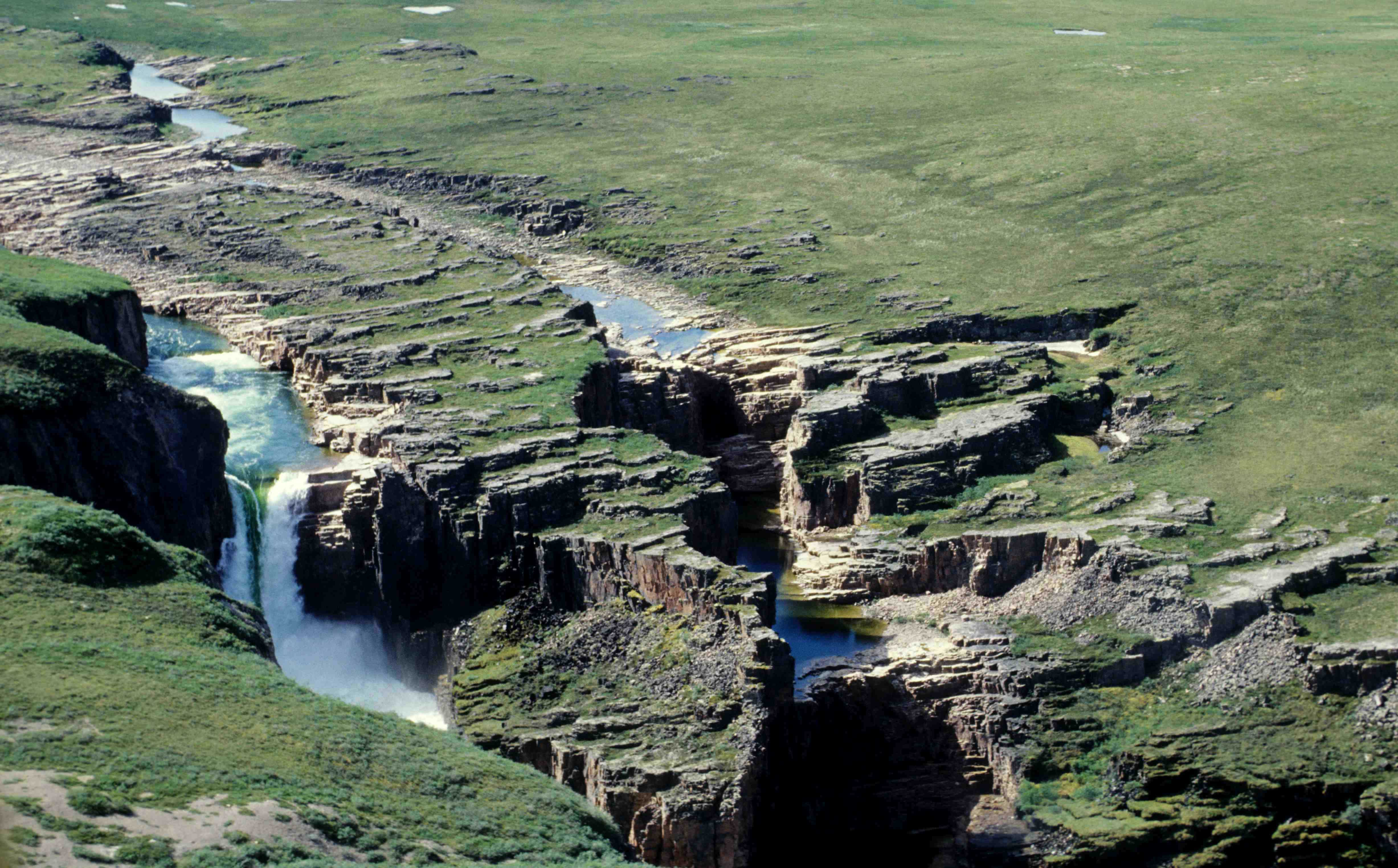
- The falls

- Location within Nunavut
- Location: Wilberforce Gorge, Hood River, Nunavut, Canada
- Coordinates: 67°05′43″N 108°47′49″W
- Total height: 60 m (200 ft)

Kattimannap Qurlua, formerly Wilberforce Falls, is an almost 60 metres (200 ft) tall waterfall located in the Wilberforce Gorge of the Hood River in Nunavut, Canada. The falls are one of the few major waterfalls in the North America mainland north of the Arctic Circle.

== Name ==
The waterfall was originally named for William Wilberforce, an English politician and leader of the movement to abolish the slave trade. In 2020 the name of the falls was changed to Kattimannap Qurlua.

== See also ==
- List of waterfalls
- List of waterfalls in Canada
