= Minnguq =

Lake in Nunavut, Canada

- Mingo Lake, ᒥᙳᖅ
- Interactive map of Minnguq
- Location: Baffin Island
- Coordinates: 64°35′0″N 72°10′0″W
- Type: Glacial lake
- Basin countries: Canada
- Max. length: 16.8 kilometres (10.4 mi)
- Max. width: 14.8 kilometres (9.2 mi)

Minnguq (Inuktitut syllabics: ᒥᙳᖅ), also known as Mingo Lake, is a lake located in Baffin Island, Nunavut, Canada. It is 201.7 kilometres (125.3 mi) from Iqaluit, and 364.1 kilometres (226.2 mi) to Auyuittuq National Park. Minnguq is a toponym translated as "a lake where there are many caterpillars under the rocks.".

== Geography ==
Minnguq is measured 16.8 kilometres (10.4 mi) in length, and 14.8 kilometres (9.2 mi) in width. A small river named Mingo River connects Minnguq to Amadjuak Lake. It has one named island, named Qikiqtakuaaq. Nearby lakes include Sophia Lake, Paula Lake, and Sylvia Grinnel Lake.

== See also ==
- List of lakes of Nunavut
