= Napaktulik Lake =

Lake in Nunavut, Canada

- Location within Nunavut

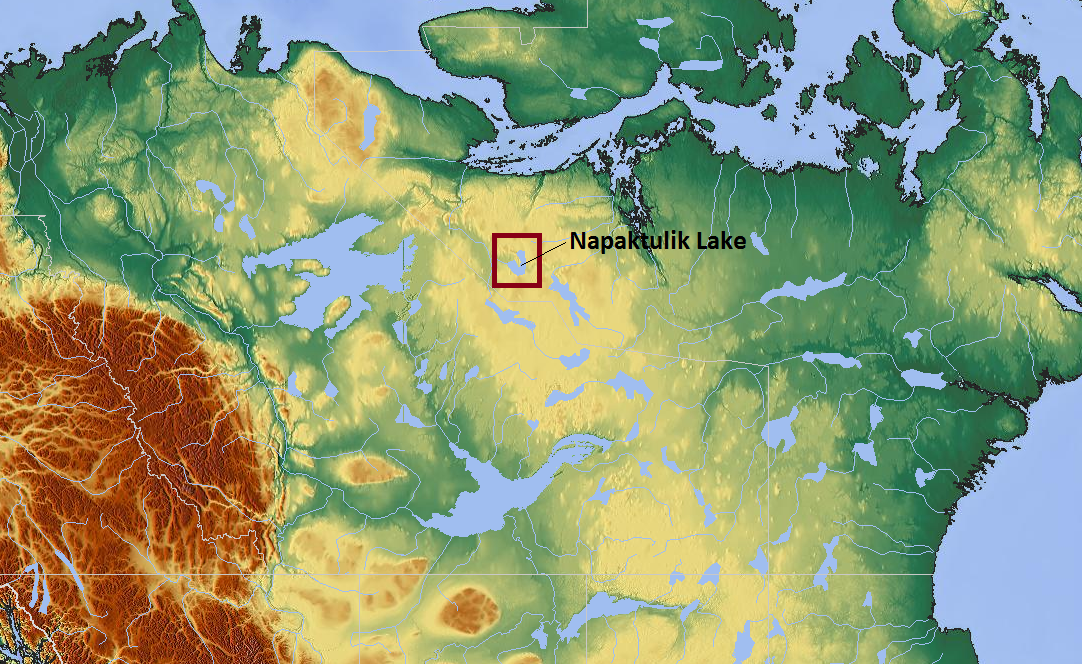
- Location: Kitikmeot Region, Nunavut
- Coordinates: 66°20′N 113°00′W
- Basin countries: Canada
- Surface area: 1,080 km^{2} (420 sq mi)
- Surface elevation: 381 m (1,250 ft)
- References: The Canadian Encyclopedia

Napaktulik Lake formerly Takiyuak Lake or Takijuq Lake is the eighth largest lake in Nunavut, Canada. It is located 173 km (107 mi) south of Kugluktuk and is the source of the Hood River.

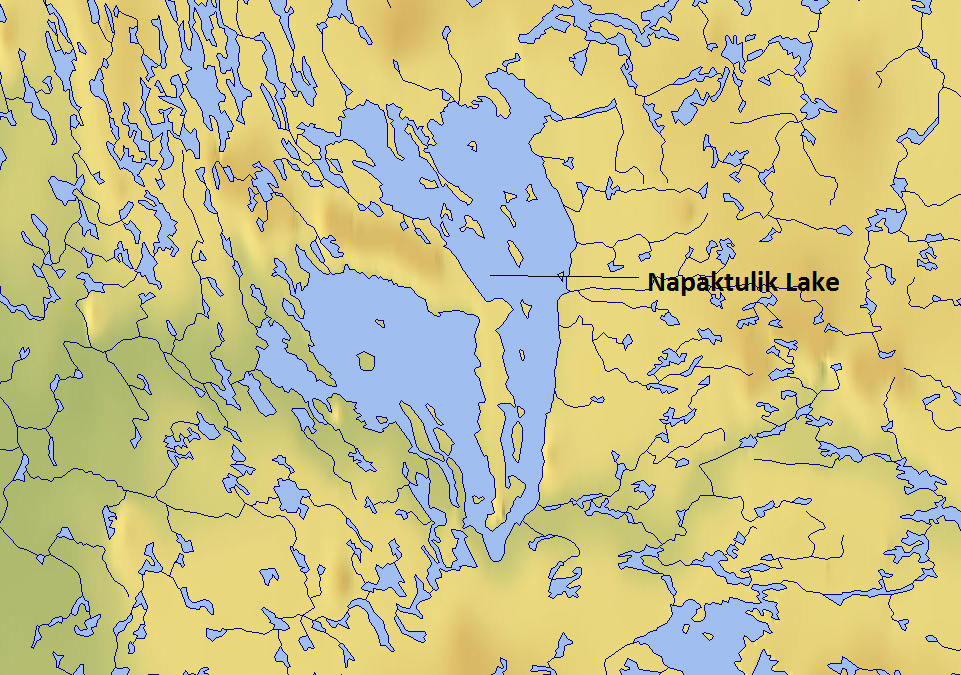
Map

== See also ==
- List of lakes of Nunavut
- List of lakes of Canada
