= Wilson Bay =

Bay in Nunavut, Canada

- Location within Nunavut
- Location: Hudson Bay
- Coordinates: 62°15′N 92°43′W
- Ocean/sea sources: Arctic Ocean
- Basin countries: Canada
- Settlements: Uninhabited

Wilson Bay is a waterway in the Kivalliq Region, Nunavut, Canada. It is located in northwestern Hudson Bay, west of Whale Bay and north of Mistake Bay. It has numerous shoals, some of which are dry.
