= Angikuni Lake =

Lake in Nunavut, Canada

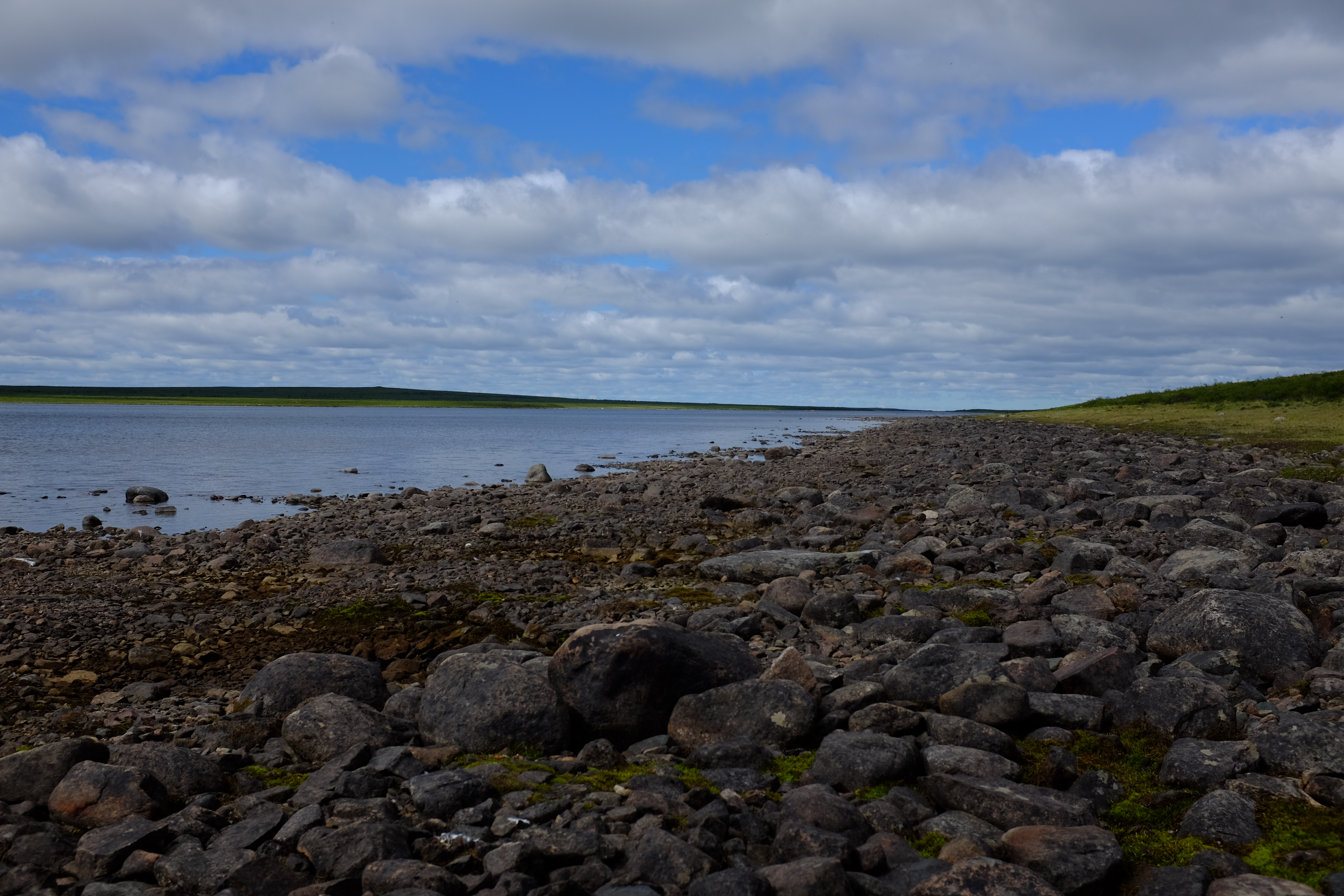
- Angikuni Lake, July 2014

- Location in Nunavut
- Location: Kivalliq Region, Nunavut
- Coordinates: 62°12′N 99°59′W
- Primary inflows: Kazan River
- Primary outflows: Kazan River
- Basin countries: Canada
- Surface area: 510 km^{2} (197 sq mi)
- Surface elevation: 257 m (843 ft)
- Islands: Many
- Settlements: uninhabited

Angikuni Lake (variant: Lake Anjikuni) is a lake in Kivalliq Region, Nunavut, Canada. It is one of several lakes located along the Kazan River; Ennadai Lake is to the south and Yathkyed Lake is to the north.

== Geography ==
The lake's shore is notable for rocky outcroppings of the Canadian Shield, being part of the Hearne Domain, Western Churchill province of the Churchill Craton.

== Fauna ==
Barren-ground caribou migrate through the area. The lake contains Lake trout, Northern pike, and Arctic grayling.

== Ethnography ==
During his 1948 trip, Canadian explorer Farley Mowat arrived at Angikuni Lake, then part of the Northwest Territories, and found a cairn constructed in a fashion not normally used by area Inuit. It contained pieces of a hardwood flattened box with dovetailed corners. Mowat, knowing that only one other European explorer, Samuel Hearne, had been in this region previously (in 1770), speculated that the monument was built by Francis Crozier, who, as a member of the lost expedition originally led by Sir John Franklin, vanished in 1848 during the ill-fated search for the Northwest Passage.

== Legend of the vanishing village ==
In 1930, a newsman in The Pas, Manitoba reported on a small Inuit village right off of Lake Angikuni. The village had always welcomed the fur trappers who passed through occasionally. However, in 1930, Joe Labelle, a fur trapper well known in the village, found that all the villagers had gone. He found unfinished shirts that still had needles in them and food hanging over fire pits and therefore concluded that the villagers had left suddenly. Even more disturbing, he found seven sled dogs dead from starvation and a grave that had been dug up. Labelle knew that an animal could not have been responsible because the stones circling the grave were undisturbed. He reported this to the Royal Canadian Mounted Police (RCMP), who conducted a search for the missing people; no one was ever found.

The story is first found in the November 27, 1930 issue of the Danville Bee in Danville, Virginia, written by journalist Emmett E. Kelleher. That article states that Joe Labelle found an empty Eskimo camp with 6 tents and that 25 men, women and children had vanished. The story also appears in Frank Edwards's 1959 book Stranger than Science; other versions appear in Whitley Strieber's science fiction novel Majestic and Dean Koontz's horror novel Phantoms. The World's Greatest UFO Mysteries (presented as fact) has an even more detailed version, as do other websites and books, adding other standard details such as mysterious lights in the sky, empty graveyards, and over a thousand people missing.

After the article was reported in Canadian newspapers, the RCMP received inquiries. In January 1931, Sergeant J. Nelson, stationed in The Pas, filed an internal report that was released to the public. Nelson wrote he could find "no foundation for this story." Nelson reported that Joe Labelle, the informant, had taken out his first trapping license that season and questioned whether he had been in the territories previously as stated in the Kelleher article. Nelson continued, dating one of the photos used in the story to 1909 and stating that Kelleher was known for "colorful stories." The incident appears to have been forgotten until referenced by Edwards's 1959 book.

The RCMP has since changed their minds and dismissed the case as an urban legend, claiming that the story originated in Frank Edwards' book. The RCMP also claims, "It is also believed that such a large village would never have been possible in such a remote area." (Note: Although the aforementioned book the RCMP references mentions just 30 people and one grave, at least the argument may refute some variants of the story that more than a thousand people had been vanished. After all, the earliest version of the story in the news article states that it was a village of 6 tents with 25 people.) The RCMP states that it has no record of any unusual activity in the area.

Brian Dunning debunked the claims in an episode of Skeptoid, although he updated his findings to report that he uncovered the existence of the November 1930 Emmett E. Kelleher article, previously believing there were no such references and that the story originated with the 1959 Edwards book (which he admits is incorrect). While he still cites Kelleher's story as "dubious", he also admits that despite this, the published article "does indeed exist."

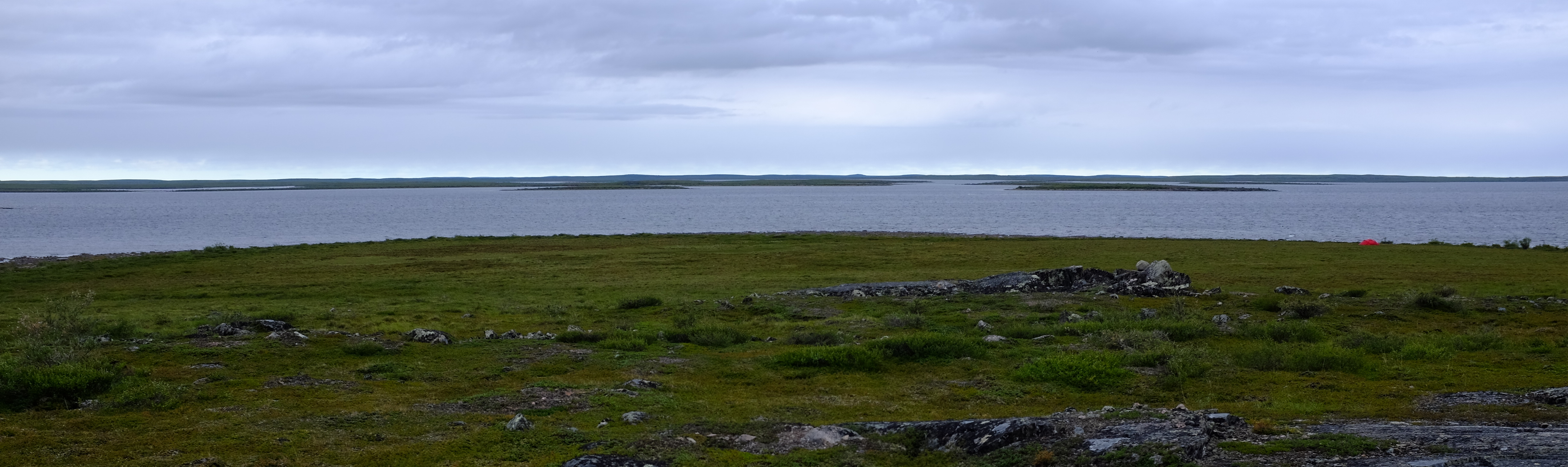
At the headwaters of Angikuni lake, where it meets the Kazan River
