= Kamilukuak Lake =

Lake in Nunavut and the Northwest Territories, Canada

- Location in Nunavut
- Location: Kivalliq Region, Nunavut
- Coordinates: 62°19′9.49″N 101°48′7.43″W
- Primary inflows: Kamilukuak River
- Primary outflows: Kamilukuak River
- Basin countries: Canada
- Surface area: 638 km^{2} (246 sq mi)
- Surface elevation: 266 m (873 ft)

Kamilukuak Lake is a large lake in the Kivalliq Region of Nunavut in Canada. Part of the lake to the west lies in the Northwest Territories. The lake is 25 km south of Dubawnt Lake.

== See also ==
- List of lakes of Nunavut
- List of lakes of Canada
