= Tavani, Nunavut =

Abandoned settlement in Nunavut, Canada

Coordinates: 62°04′N 093°06′W

The locality Tavani (TA-vuh-nee) was a mining settlement and trading post in the Kivalliq Region of Nunavut, Canada. Sometimes known as Tavane, it is located on western Hudson Bay's Mistake Bay, 31.3 km (19.4 mi) south of the community of Whale Cove and 97 km (60 mi) east of Kaminak Lake.

== History ==
Tavani was established in the summer of 1928 by Dominion Explorers Limited, a mineral exploration company, who used it as an aerial base for prospecting activity along the Hudson Bay coastline. Guy Blanchet, party leader, overwintered at the base in 1928/1929. Dominion Explorers sold the buildings to the Hudson's Bay Company in the fall of 1929, moving its aerial base to Baker Lake and other areas of the north.

== Geology ==
The precambrian geology of Tavani, nearby Marble Island, and Chesterfield Inlet are described by Tella in a 1986 Geological Survey of Canada report.

== See also ==
- List of communities in Nunavut
