= Phantoms (novel) =

1983 novel by Dean Koontz

- First edition
- Author: Dean Koontz
- Language: English
- Genre: Science fiction, weird, horror
- Publisher: Putnam
- Publication date: March 1983
- Publication place: United States
- Media type: Print (hardcover, paperback)
- Pages: 352
- ISBN: 0-399-12655-4
- OCLC: 48925027
- LC Class: CPB Box no. 1919 vol. 16

Phantoms is a horror novel by American writer Dean Koontz, first published in 1983. The story is a version of the now-debunked urban legend involving a village mysteriously vanishing at Angikuni Lake.

The novel includes many literary tips of the hat to the work of H. P. Lovecraft; the novel suggests the 'Ancient Enemy' is Lovecraft's god Nyarlathotep, also known as the 'Crawling Chaos', and the air force specialist in potential contact with non-human intelligence is named 'Captain Arkham' (cf. Lovecraft's invention Arkham). Most of these Lovecraftian references were excised from the 1998 film version of Koontz's novel.

== Plot summary ==
Sisters Jenny and Lisa Paige return to Snowfield, California, a small ski-resort town in the Sierra Nevada where Jenny works as a doctor, and find no one alive. Most of the residents have vanished; the few bodies the sisters find are either mutilated or show signs of a sudden, unexplained death. Growing alarmed, Jenny reaches the sheriff's department in a nearby town and asks for help.

The responding officers are led by Sheriff Bryce Hammond, a widower whose young son, Timmy, has lain comatose in a hospital since an accident a year earlier that also killed Hammond's wife; doctors believe the boy avoided serious brain damage and could recover if he wakes. Hammond's department and the sisters call in a military chemical- and biological-warfare unit. The only clue to the deaths and disappearances is a message left by one victim, who scrawled the name "Timothy Flyte" and the title of his book The Ancient Enemy on a mirror before he was killed. Flyte is a British academic whose book catalogs and describes various mass vanishings of people in different parts of the world over the centuries.

It is discovered that the town was built over the hibernating place of one such "ancient enemy," an amoeboid shapeshifter. The creature feeds only rarely, but with devastating effect. Flyte's theory holds that it, or others like it, caused or contributed to the extinction of the dinosaurs and to historical mass vanishings such as the collapse of the Mayan civilization, the lost colony of Roanoke, and the crews of abandoned ghost ships.

The creature consumes other organisms to increase its mass and can perfectly mimic them. It detaches parts of itself as "phantoms," imitations of the life forms it has absorbed, and sends them out to hunt, controlling them from its "hive mind." It also absorbs the knowledge and memories of its victims.

Conventional weapons have no effect, as the creature simply reabsorbs any damaged tissue. The surviving scientists discover that its flesh is rich in hydrocarbons and chemically resembles petroleum, and they attack it with oil-eating bacteria modeled on the real, patented microorganisms developed by Ananda Mohan Chakrabarty. The bacteria break down the creature's tissue, and Hammond pours the solution into its subterranean lair, killing the entire organism. Several of the survivors die before it is destroyed.

Meanwhile, murderer Fletcher Kale escapes police custody and hides in a mountain cave that proves to be the creature's lair. There, he and Gene Terr, the leader of a Satan-worshipping biker gang, encounter the dying creature, which presents itself as Lucifer, promises them invincibility, and orders them to kill Hammond, his comatose son, and the surviving women. A week later, the two attack at the county hospital. Kale reaches Timmy's room intending to kill the boy, but Hammond shoots him. Terr is killed as well, and Kale, weakened by the Rocky Mountain spotted fever he contracted in the cave, dies soon after. Hammond and Jenny later marry, and Hammond, who had come to view death as a mercy for Timmy, instead regains hope that the boy will recover.

== Court case ==
In 1992, Koontz filed suit against Zebra Books for the misappropriation of Phantoms in two titles Zebra published by author "Pauline Dunn" (in actuality sisters Dawn Pauline Dunn and Susan Hartzell collaborating under a pen name). Spotted by a reader who informed Koontz's publisher, the two books in question – The Crawling Dark and Demonic Color – mimicked Phantoms extensively and even copied passages word-for-word. The legal team for Koontz won, resulting in the sisters returning their advances for both books and Zebra placing an ad in Publishers Weekly acknowledging the plagiarism and withdrawing both titles.

== Film adaptation ==
Phantoms was adapted into a film in 1998 starring Peter O'Toole, Rose McGowan, Liev Schreiber, Ben Affleck, and Joanna Going. It was directed by Joe Chappelle, produced by Neo Art & Logic, and released by Dimension Films. It was filmed in Colorado.
