= Hall Lake (Clearwater County, Minnesota) =

Lake in the state of Minnesota, United States

- Location within Minnesota
- Location: Clearwater County, Minnesota
- Coordinates: 47°10′54″N 95°13′27″W
- Type: lake

Hall Lake is a lake in Clearwater County, Minnesota, in the United States.

Hall Lake was named for Edwin S. Hall, a government surveyor.

== See also ==
- List of lakes in Minnesota
