= Hall Lake (Martin County, Minnesota) =

Lake in the state of Minnesota, United States

- Location within Minnesota
- Location: Martin County, Minnesota
- Coordinates: 43°37′21″N 94°28′7″W
- Type: lake

Hall Lake is a lake in Martin County, in the U.S. state of Minnesota.

Hall Lake was named for E. Banks Hall, a pioneer settler.

== See also ==
- List of lakes in Minnesota
