= Baker Lake (Nunavut) =

Lake in Nunavut, Canada

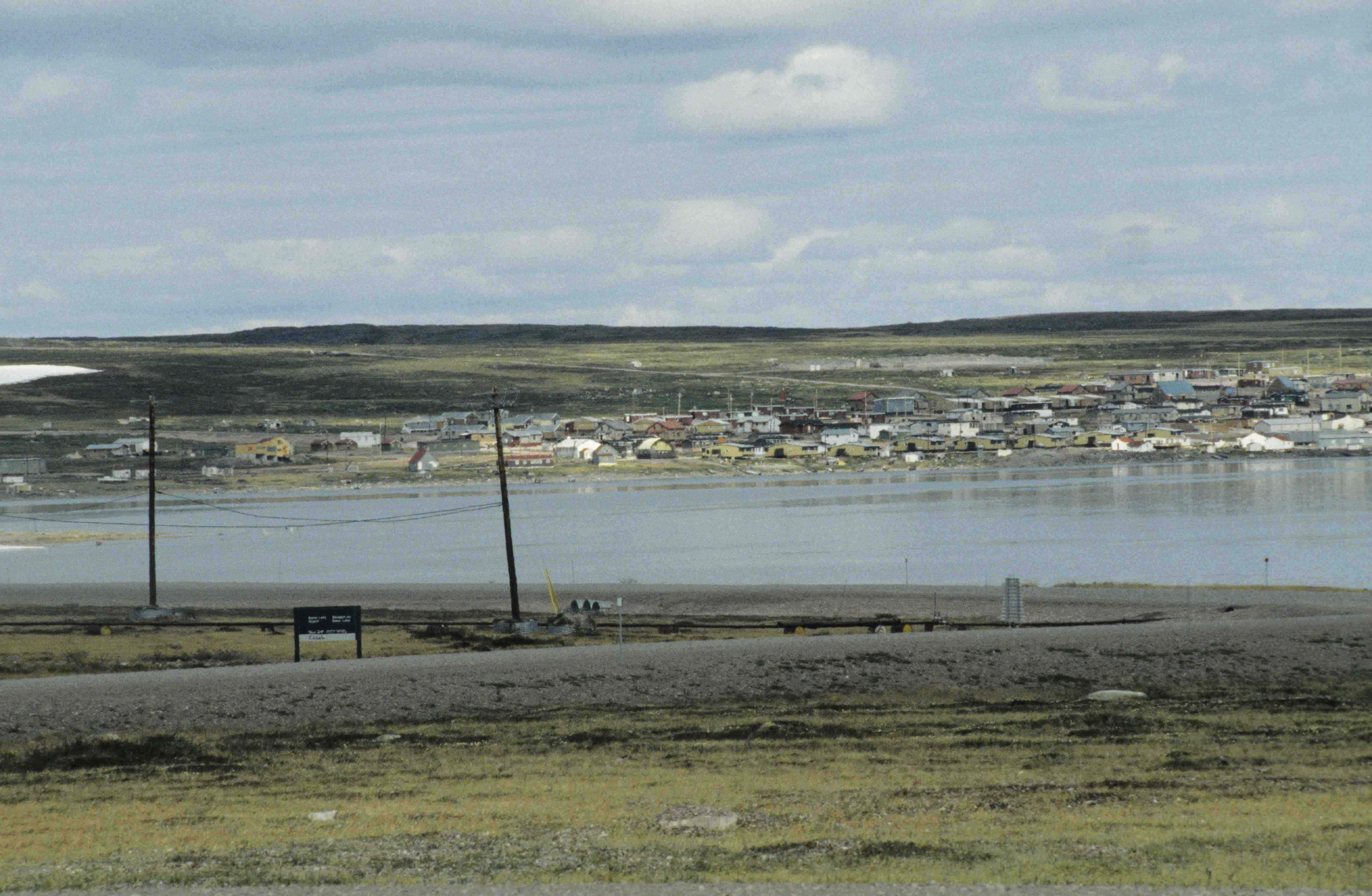

- Location in Nunavut Baker Lake (Canada)
- Location: Kivalliq Region, Nunavut
- Coordinates: 64°10′N 095°30′W
- Primary inflows: Thelon River, Kazan River
- Primary outflows: Chesterfield Inlet
- Catchment area: 244,119 km^{2} (94,255 sq mi)
- Basin countries: Canada
- Surface area: 1,887 km^{2} (729 sq mi)
- Average depth: 60 m (200 ft)
- Max. depth: 230 m (750 ft)
- Water volume: 113.22 km^{3} (27.16 cu mi)
- Shore length^{1}: 697 km (433 mi)
- Surface elevation: 2 m (6 ft 7 in)
- Settlements: Baker Lake
- ^{1} Shore length is not a well-defined measure.

Baker Lake (Inuktitut: Qamani'tuaq; 'where the river widens') is a lake in the Kivalliq Region, Nunavut, Canada. It is fed by the Thelon River from the west and the Kazan River from the south. It outflows into Chesterfield Inlet. The lake is approximately 1,887 km^{2} (729 sq mi) in size. It has several named bays, and a few islands.

In 1762 William Christopher reached Baker Lake via Chesterfield Inlet. The Inuit hamlet of Baker Lake is at the west end of the lake near the mouth of the Thelon River. Although the Inuit had been in the area for some time, the first outside presence was the Royal North-West Mounted Police post at the east end of the lake in 1915. This was followed in 1916 by the Hudson's Bay Company post set up at the Kazan River delta until 1930 when it moved to its present location.

== Fauna ==
The lake's area is home to Beverly and Qamanirjuaq Caribou herds, as well as other wildlife associated with northern Canada's Arctic.

== See also ==
- List of lakes of Nunavut
- List of lakes of Canada
