= Tulemalu Lake =

Lake in Nunavut, Canada

- Location within Nunavut

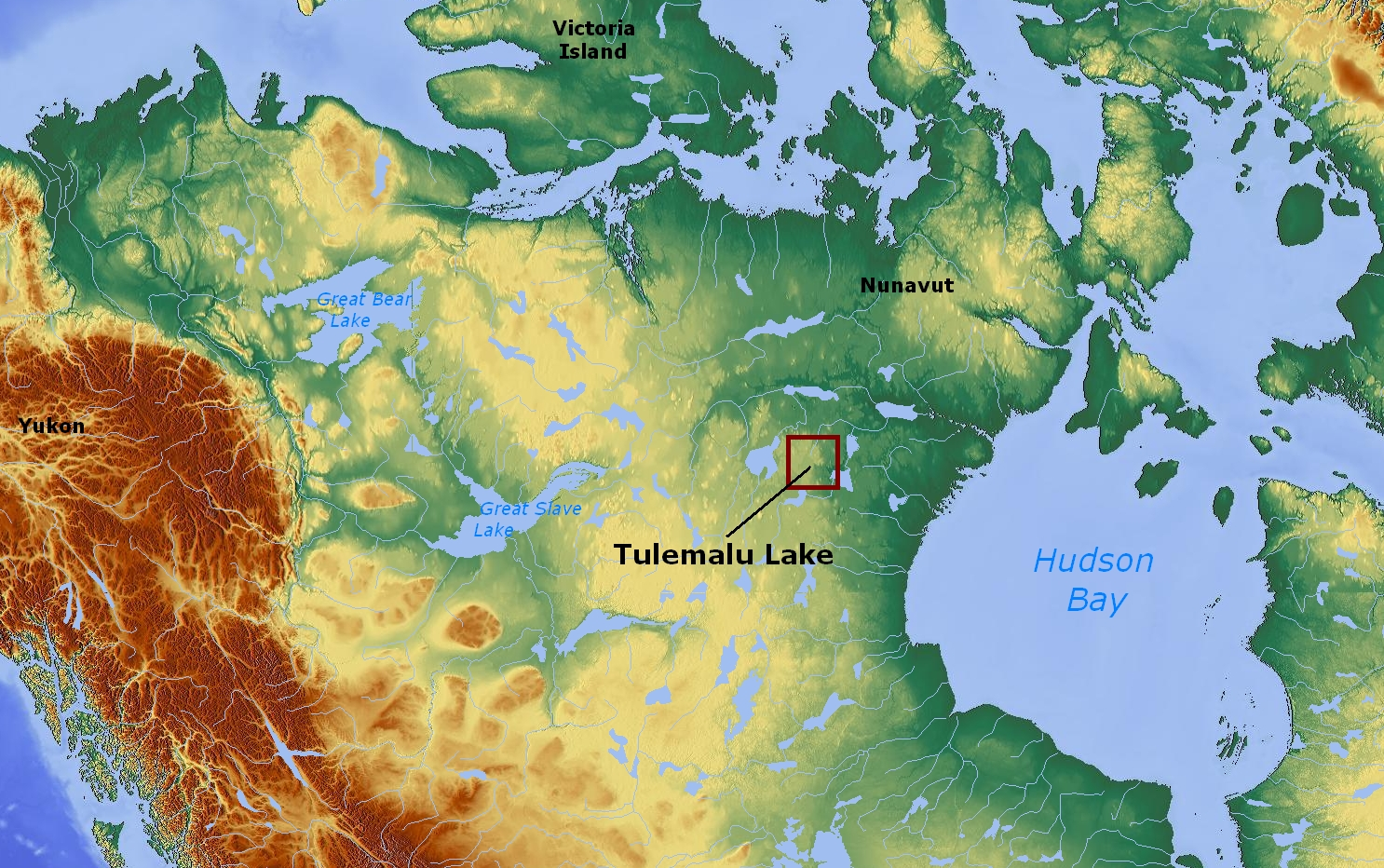
- Location: Kivalliq Region, Nunavut
- Coordinates: 62°56′N 99°24′W
- Basin countries: Canada
- Surface area: 668 km^{2} (258 sq mi)
- Surface elevation: 279 m (915 ft)

Tulemalu Lake is a lake in Kivalliq Region, Nunavut, Canada.

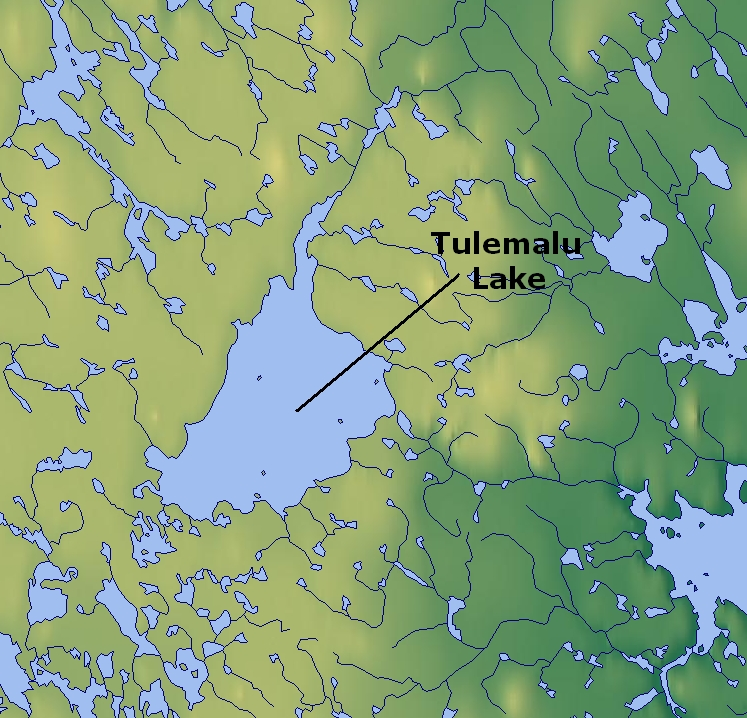
Map

== See also ==
- List of lakes of Nunavut
- List of lakes of Canada
