= Mallery Lake =

Lake in Kivalliq, Nunavut, Canada

- Tahijuaq akutliq (Inuktitut)
- Location in Nunavut
- Location: Kivalliq Region, Nunavut, Canada
- Coordinates: 63.98°N 98.38°W
- Primary inflows: Kunwak River
- Primary outflows: Kunwak River
- Surface area: 467 km^{2} (180 sq mi)
- Surface elevation: 158 m (518 ft)

Mallery Lake (Inuktitut: Tahijuaq akutliq) is a lake in Kivalliq Region in the Canadian territory of Nunavut. It lies at an elevation of 158 m (518 ft) and covers an area of 467 km^{2} (180 sq mi), not including 12 km^{2} (4.6 sq mi) occupied by islands within the lake. The Kunwak River flows into it from the southwest and drains it in the southeast. Lake trout and lake whitefish inhabit the lake, and caribou hunting is occasionally practised around the lake in the winter.
