= MacAlpine Lake =

Lake in Nunavut, Canada

- Location within Nunavut Location within Canada
- Interactive map of MacAlpine Lake
- Location: Nunavut
- Coordinates: 66°32′N 102°45′W
- Primary outflows: Perry River
- Surface area: 447 km^{2} (173 sq mi)
- Surface elevation: 176 m (577 ft)

MacAlpine Lake is a lake in the Canadian territory of Nunavut.

== Location ==
The lake is situated in a tundra landscape in northern Canada, 140 km (87 mi) south of the Arctic Ocean. The town of Baker Lake is located almost 400 km (250 mi) south-east of the lake. The water area is 421 km^{2} (163 sq mi), and with islands the total area is 447 km^{2} (173 sq mi).

The Perry River drains the lake northwards to the Queen Maud Gulf.
