= Kazan River =

Canadian Heritage River in Nunavut, Canada

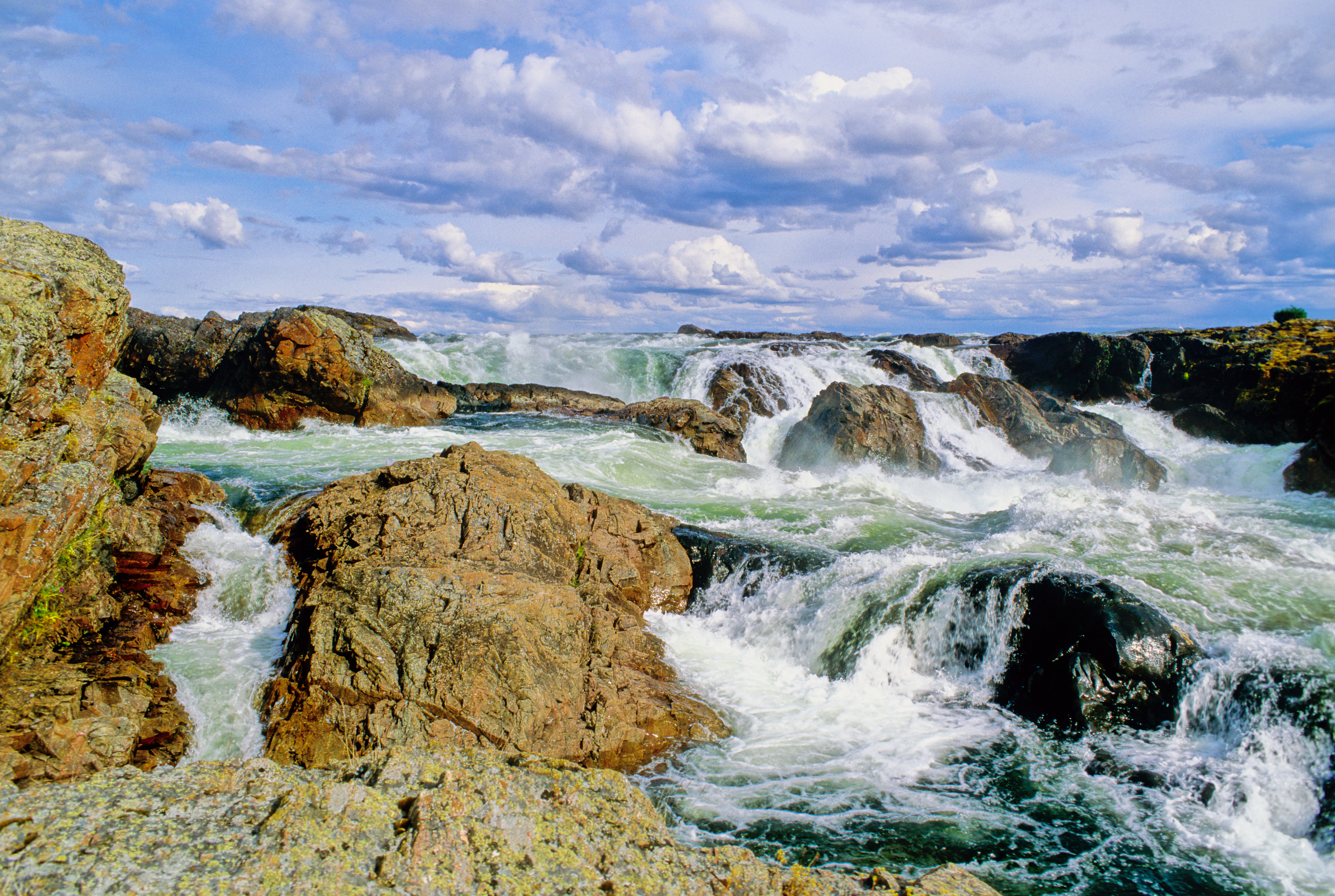
- Kazan Falls, on the lower Kazan River

- Kazan River mouth location Kazan River (Canada)

Location
- Country: Canada

Physical characteristics
- Source: Kasba Lake
  - location: Northwest Territories
  - coordinates: 60°34′22″N 102°08′47″W
- Mouth: Baker Lake
  - location: near Chesterfield Inlet, Kivalliq Region, Nunavut
  - coordinates: 64°2′30″N 95°29′5″W
  - elevation: 2 m (6 ft 7 in)
- Length: 1,000 km (620 mi)
- Basin size: 71,500 km^{2} (27,600 sq mi)

The Kazan River (Inuktitut Harvaqtuuq, Inuktitut syllabics ᓴᕐᕙᖅᑑᖅ; meaning "strong rapids", "the big drift" or "place of much fast flowing water"), is a Canadian Heritage River located in Nunavut, Canada. The Dene name for the river was Kasba-tue meaning "white partridge river." The name was apparently changed to Kazan in the late 19th century due to the influence of Order of Mary Immaculate missionaries. The river headwaters are in northern Saskatchewan at Kasba Lake, and it flows north for about 1,000 kilometres (620 mi) before emptying into Baker Lake (64°09′00″N 95°30′00″W), on the opposite side of the mouth of the Thelon River. Along its course the river flows through several lakes, including Ennadai Lake and Yathkyed Lake, over the Kazan Falls (25 metres (82 ft)), down a red sandstone gorge and through both boreal forest and tundra. It is the last section of the river, below Ennadai Lake, that is above the timber line and is designated a Canadian Heritage River.

== History ==
The abundance of wildlife along and close to the river attracted both the Caribou Inuit and the Chipewyan Sayisi Dene for about 5,000 years. Originally, the Caribou Inuit did not live in the area but returned to the coast for the winter. In the 18th century, Dene use of the area declined and Caribou Inuit, especially the Harvaqtuurmiut ("people of the Harvaqtuuq") and Ihalmiut bands, began to live along the river year round. Remnants of Ihalmiut campsites, and those of the Dene may be found along the river. Although the Inuit today no longer live along the river, they do still travel it to hunt and fish.

The first European to visit the area was Samuel Hearne in 1770 at Yathkyed Lake. However, the river was not mapped until visited by Canadian geologist and cartographer Joseph Tyrrell in 1894. Explorer Knud Rasmussen also visited the area in 1921–1924 during the Fifth Thule Expedition.

== Recreation ==
The river has also become a popular destination for kayaking and canoeists.

== Fauna and flora ==
Although many species of wildlife may be observed along the river, it is the barren-ground caribou (Qamanirjuaq and Beverly herds) for which it is most well known. Over 300,000 caribou migrate through the area and it is said to be the largest migration of any land animal. Other wildlife that may be observed in the area include muskox, wolverine, peregrine falcon and many species of fish.

== Gallery ==
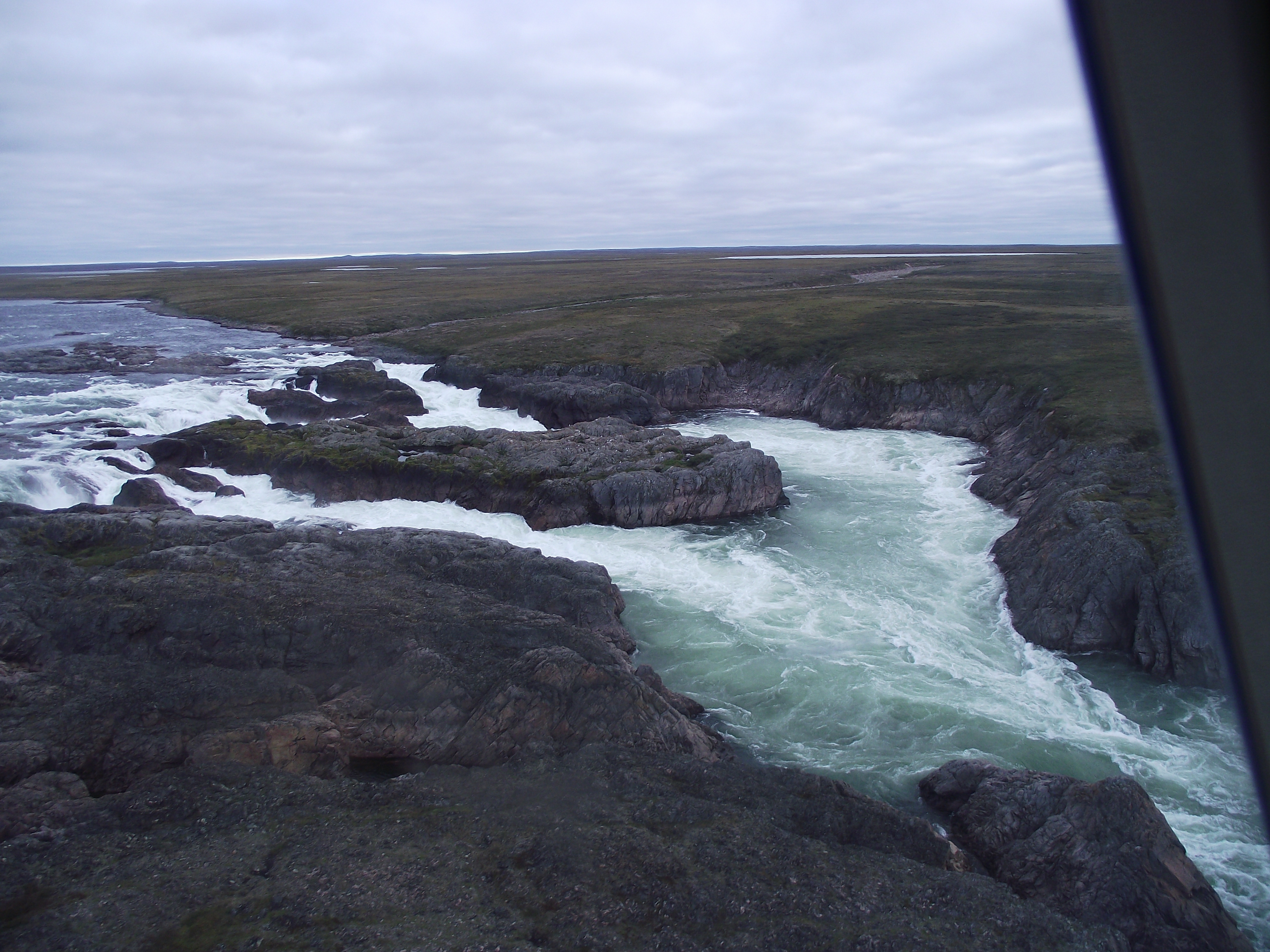
Air view of the lower Kazan River

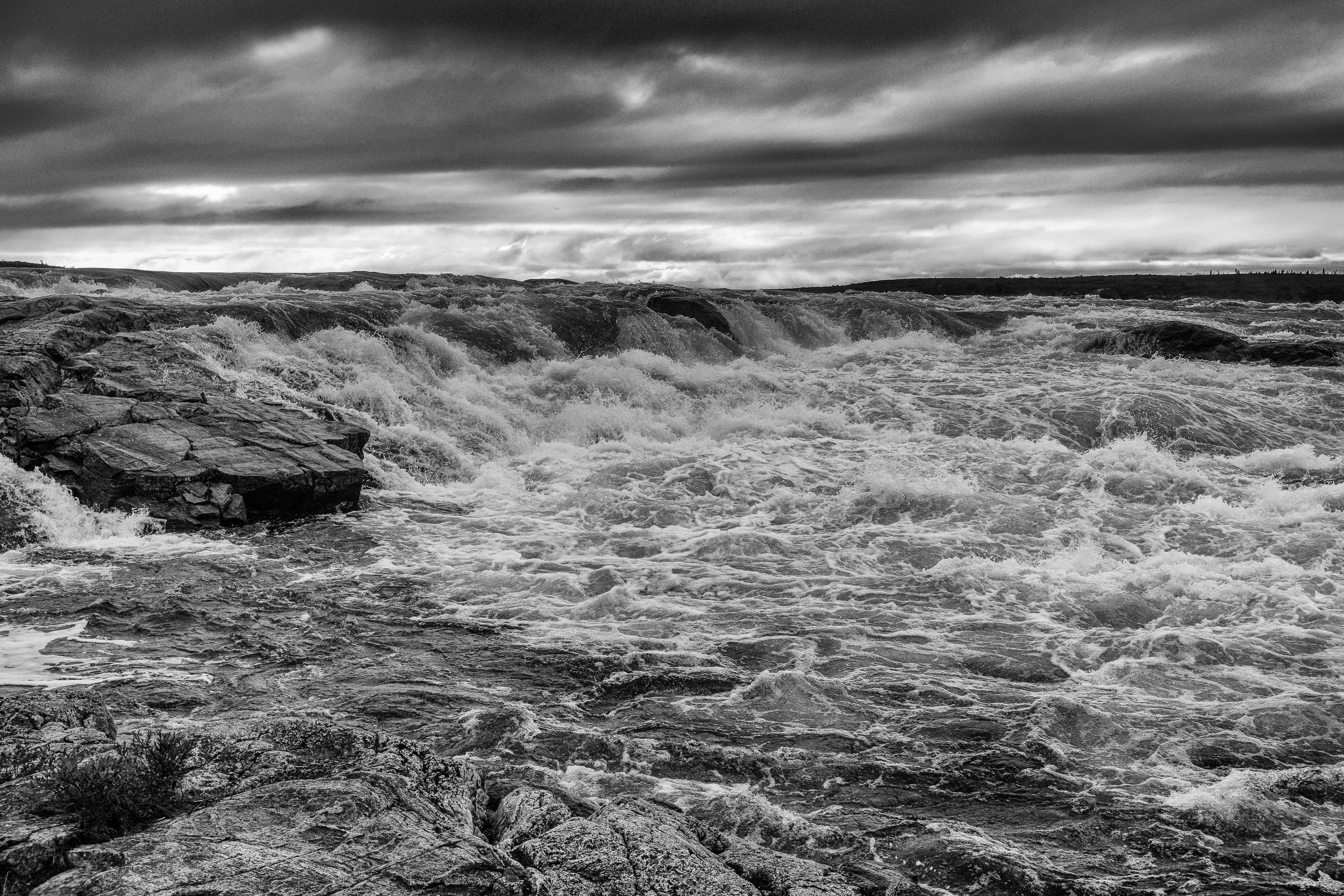
The river's first rapid of note after Angikuni Lake, summer 2017

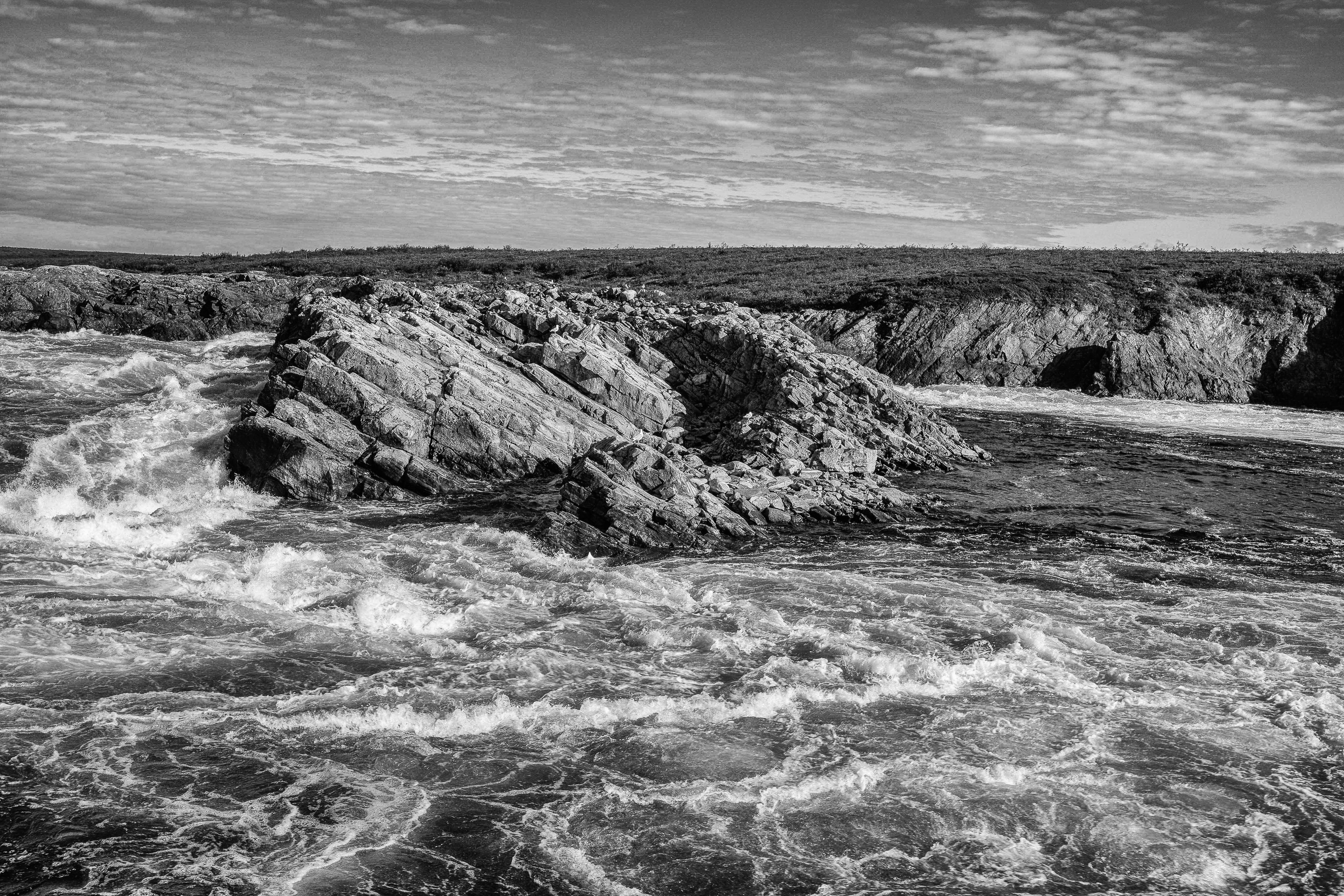
The river's second rapid of note after Angikuni Lake, summer 2017

== See also ==
- List of longest rivers of Canada
- List of rivers of Nunavut
