= Princess Mary Lake =

- Tahijuaq tuklirpaar (Inuktitut)
- Location in Nunavut
- Location: Kivalliq Region, Nunavut, Canada
- Coordinates: 63.95°N 97.58°W
- Type: lake
- Primary inflows: Kunwak River
- Primary outflows: Kunwak River
- Surface area: 471 km^{2} (182 sq mi)
- Surface elevation: 116 m (381 ft)

Princess Mary Lake (Inuktitut: Tahijuaq tuklirpaar) is a lake in Kivalliq Region in the Canadian territory of Nunavut. It lies at an elevation of 116 m (381 ft) and covers an area of 471 km^{2} (182 sq mi), not including 53 km^{2} (20 sq mi) occupied by islands within the lake. The Kunwak River flows into it from the west and drains it in the southeast. Lake trout and lake whitefish are found in the lake, and caribou hunting and fox trapping are occasionally practised around the lake in the winter.
