= Tyrrell Lake (Alberta) =

Lake in Alberta, Canada

- Location within Alberta
- Location: County of Warner No. 5, Alberta
- Coordinates: 49°23′24″N 112°16′13″W
- Basin countries: Canada
- Max. length: 3.3 km (2.1 mi)
- Max. width: 5 km (3.1 mi)
- Surface area: 3.99 km^{2} (1.54 sq mi)
- Average depth: 3.8 m (12 ft)
- Max. depth: 6.1 m (20 ft)
- Surface elevation: 961 m (3,153 ft)
- References: Tyrrell Lake

Tyrrell Lake is a saline lake in Alberta, Canada.
