= Hall Lake (Nunavut) =

Large lake in Nunavut

- ᕼᐋᓪ ᑕᓯᖅ
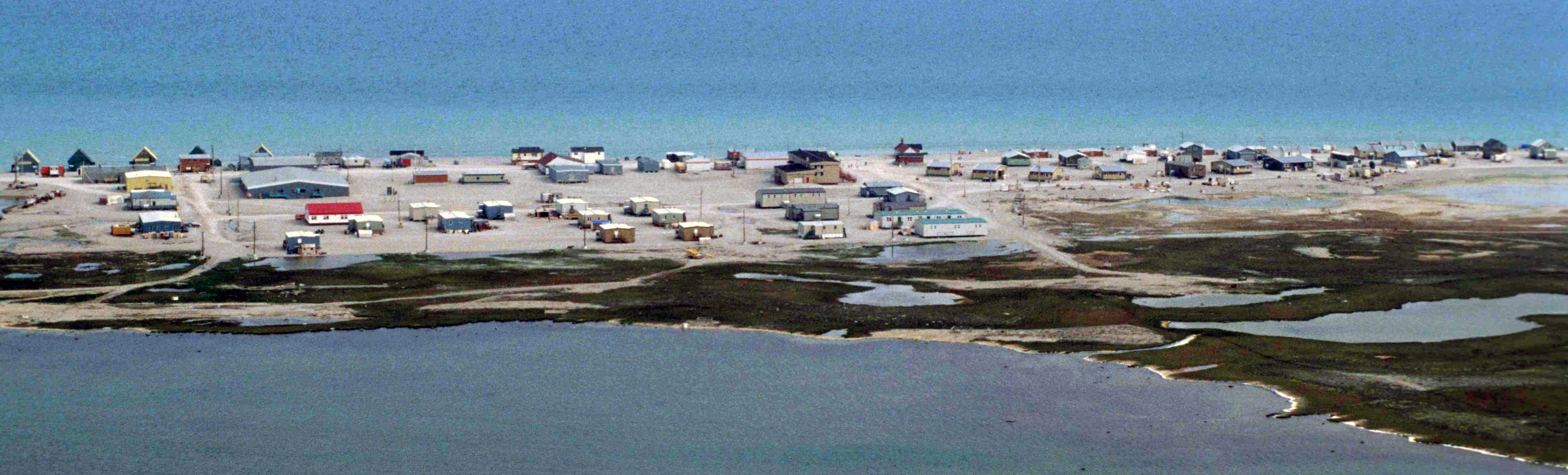
- The lakes shoreline and town
- Interactive map of Hall Lake (Nunavut)
- Location: Nunavut
- Coordinates: 68.661103°N 82.248787°W
- Type: Natural arctic lake
- Etymology: Sanirajak, the neighboring town, when its name was Hall's Beach, which was named by Charles Francis Hall.
- Surface area: 491 km^{2} (190 sq mi)
- Frozen: usually during fall and winter.
- Settlements: Sanirajak

Hall Lake (Inuktitut: ᕼᐋᓪ ᑕᓯᖅ) is a natural body of water located in Nunavut, Canada. Two islands are located in the lake: Walrus Island and Kite Island. The lake was named for Charles Francis Hall, an explorer of the Arctic. He discovered the lake, and the small town of Sanirajak nearby. (Note: At that time, it was Hall's Beach, but this was later changed.) The lake itself has an area of 190 square miles (490 km^{2}), including the islands.
