= Yathkyed Lake =

Lake in Kivalliq Region, Nunavut, Canada

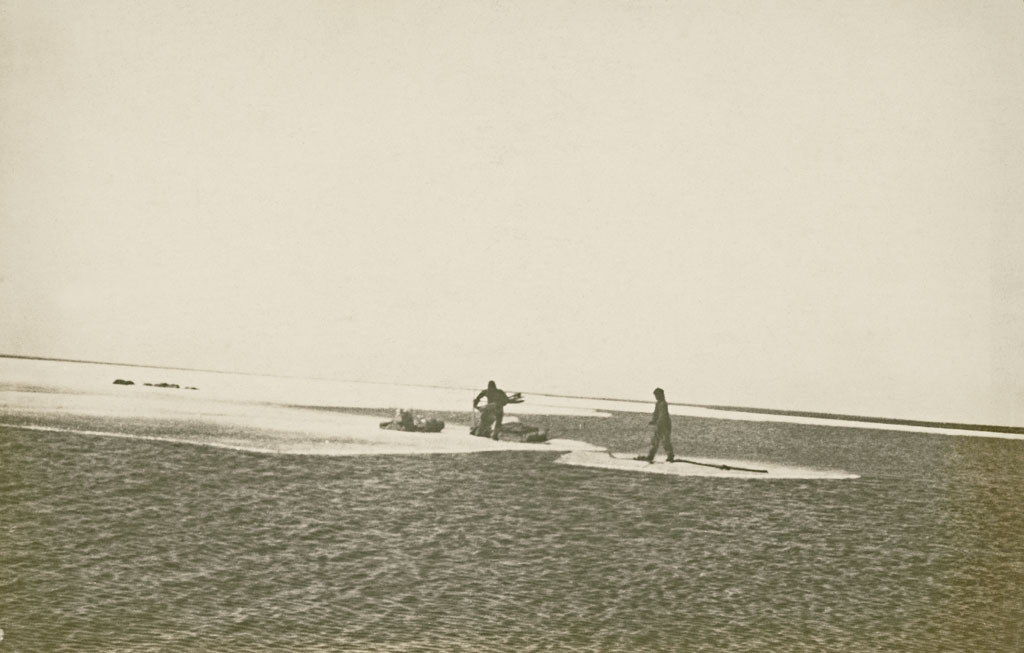
- A black and white image of two men at Yathkyed Lake using ice floes as ferry boats. The date is 1924.

- Location in Nunavut
- Location: Kivalliq Region, Nunavut
- Coordinates: 62°43′N 97°55′W
- Type: Freshwater lake
- Primary inflows: Kazan River
- Primary outflows: Kazan River
- Basin countries: Canada
- Max. length: 72 km (45 mi)
- Max. width: 34 km (21 mi)
- Surface area: 1,449 km^{2} (559 sq mi)
- Surface elevation: 140 m (460 ft)
- Settlements: uninhabited

Yathkyed Lake (variant: Haecoligua; meaning: "white swan") is a natural freshwater lake in Kivalliq Region, Nunavut, Canada. Located between Angikuni Lake and Forde Lake, it is one of several lakes on the Kazan River. Yathkyed Lake was named by the Sayisi Dene, historical barren-ground caribou hunters of the area. Caribou Inuit artifacts have also been found here. The lake has a surface area of 1,449 square kilometres.

It contains an island in a lake on an island in a lake on an island in a lake, also known as a fourth-order island. It is the only known fourth order island in the world.

== Climate ==
The climate of the area is cold with cold summers and no dry seasons.

== Geography ==
It is part of the Hearne Domain, Western Churchill province of the Churchill Craton, which is the northwest section of the Canadian Shield. According to the Atlas of Canada the geographical centre of the country lies just south of the lake at 62°24′N 096°28′W. Yathkyed Lake lies at an elevation of 82 metres (269 feet). Some locations or hamlets near Yathkyed Lake are Baker Lake at 198 kilometres north north-east, Ennadai at 236 kilometres south-west and Rankin Inlet at 300 kilometres east.

View of the fourth-order island from a helicopter flight

== Minerals ==
The Yathkyed Sedimentary Basin is notable for its uranium, copper, and molybdenum deposits. Goldcorp has a mining stake in the area, owning approximately 200,000 acres (81,000 ha). Because Goldcorp owns this lake, it is not open to the public.

A geological survey of the area was conducted in 1993 to determine the presence of potential diamond-bearing diatremes.

== See also ==
- List of lakes of Nunavut
- List of lakes of Canada
- Recursive islands and lakes
