= Tebesjuak Lake =

Lake in Nunavut, Canada

- Tahijuatuar ungalirpar (Inuktitut)
- Location in Nunavut
- Location: Kivalliq Region, Nunavut, Canada
- Coordinates: 63.77°N 99.00°W
- Primary inflows: Kunwak River
- Primary outflows: Kunwak River
- Surface area: 501 km^{2} (193 sq mi)
- Surface elevation: 146 m (479 ft)

Tebesjuak Lake (Inuktitut: Tahijuatuar ungalirpar) is a lake in Kivalliq Region in the Canadian territory of Nunavut. It lies at an elevation of 146 m (479 ft) and covers an area of 501 km^{2} (193 sq mi), not including 74 km^{2} (29 sq mi) occupied by islands within the lake. The Kunwak River flows into it from the southwest and drains it in the west. Lake trout and lake whitefish inhabit the lake, and caribou hunting is occasionally practised around the lake in the winter.
