= Joseph Tyrrell =

Canadian geologist and miner (1858–1957)

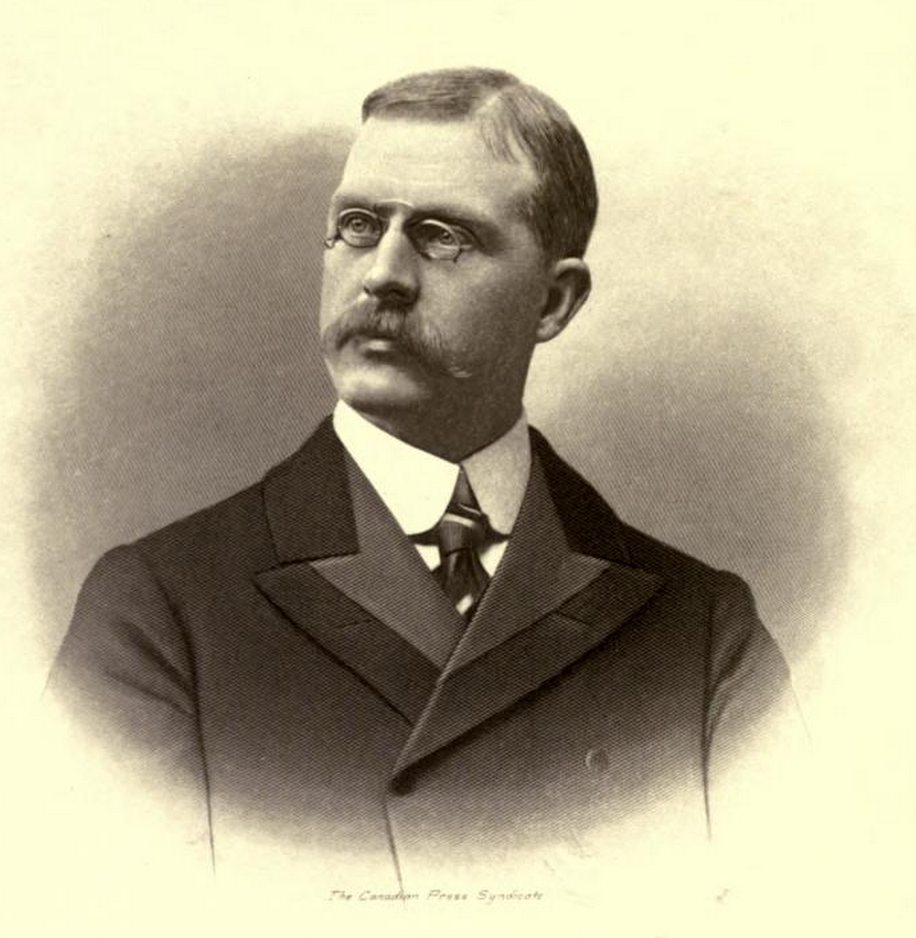
- Born: Joseph Burr Tyrrell; November 1, 1858; Weston, Canada West, Province of Canada
- Died: August 26, 1957 (aged 98); Toronto, Ontario, Canada
- Education: Upper Canada College; University of Toronto
- Known for: discovery of Albertosaurus in Alberta, c. 1884
- Scientific career
- Fields: geology, cartography

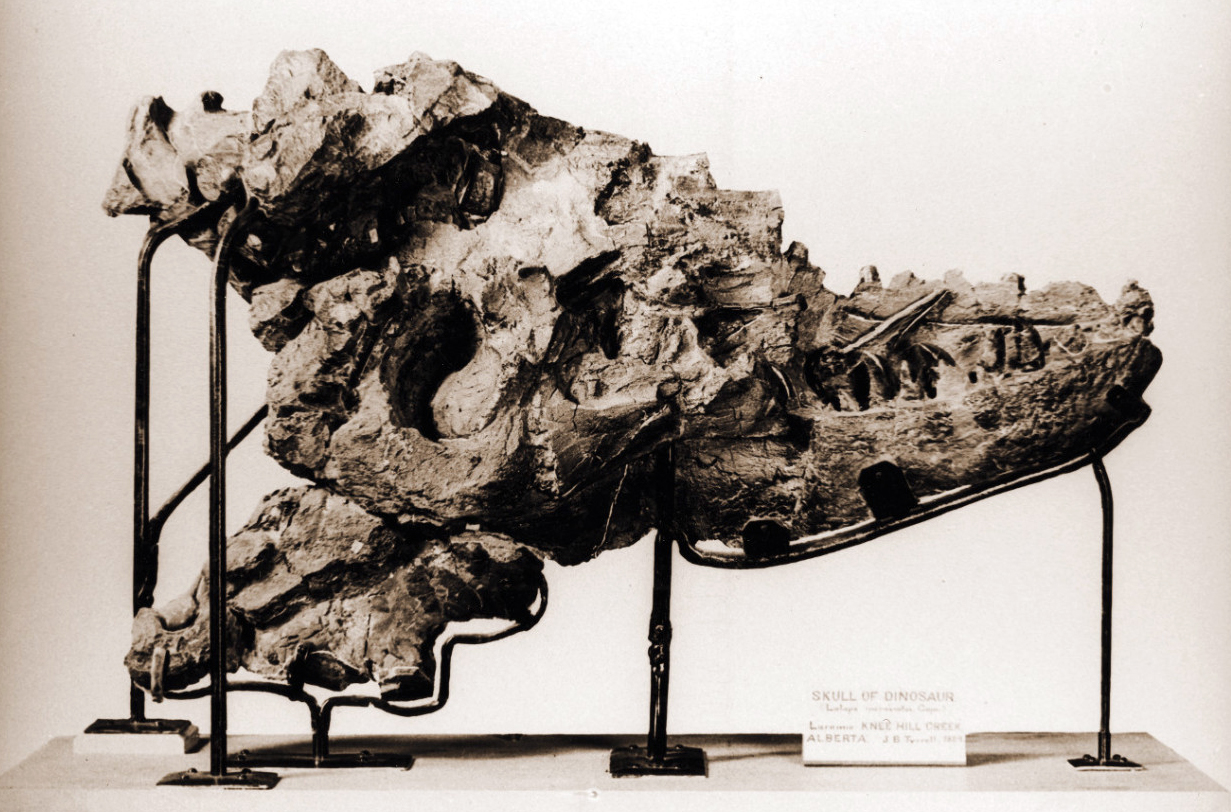
The holotype specimen of Albertosaurus discovered by Tyrrell

Joseph Burr Tyrrell, FRSC (November 1, 1858 – August 26, 1957) was a Canadian geologist, cartographer, mining consultant and historian. He discovered dinosaur (Albertosaurus sarcophagus) bones in Alberta's Badlands and coal around Drumheller in 1884. Canada's Royal Tyrrell Museum of Palaeontology in Alberta was named in his honour.

Tyrrell was born in Weston, Ontario, the fifth child of William and Elizabeth Tyrrell. He was the brother of Canadian explorer and author James William Tyrrell. He was a student at Weston Grammar School before graduating from Upper Canada College in 1876 and receiving a law degree from the University of Toronto in 1880. After articling for a law firm in Toronto, his doctor advised him to work outdoors due to his health.

He joined the Geological Survey of Canada in 1880, leading or participating in numerous explorations.

He published two books in 1888: A Brief Narrative of the Journeys of David Thompson and The Mammalia of Canada.

He led the 1893 and 1894 expeditions into the Northern Barren Lands, down the Dubawnt River, the first visit to the Kivalliq Region Barrenlands by a European since the explorations of Samuel Hearne in the 1770s. Joseph's younger brother, James William Tyrrell, accompanied him on the expedition, which included the first European contact with the Ihalmiut, Inuit from the interior of what is today Nunavut.

Tyrrell married Mary Edith Carey in 1894. They had three children: Mary (born 1896), George (born 1900), and Thomas (born 1906). Mary Edith was the founder and first president in 1921 of the Women's Association of the Mining Industry of Canada.

In 1894, Tyrrell stumbled upon biographical recollections (11 books of field notes, 39 journals, maps, and a narrative) of Canadian overland explorer, cartographer, and fur trader David Thompson and, in 1916, published them as David Thompson's Narrative.

Tyrrell went into the gold-mining business in 1898, a career that would last more than 50 years. In his work he published several books on gold fields. In 1912 he published The Law of the Pay-streak in Placer Deposits.

He was the mine manager of the Kirkland Lake Gold Mine in northern Ontario for many years starting in 1926.

Tyrrell retired to northeast Scarborough on the Rouge River, where he established substantial apple orchards and an interest in grafting and breeding. The expanded orchards, later managed by his son George, are now the site of the Toronto Zoo.

He died in Toronto in 1957 at the age of 98.

== Honours and awards ==
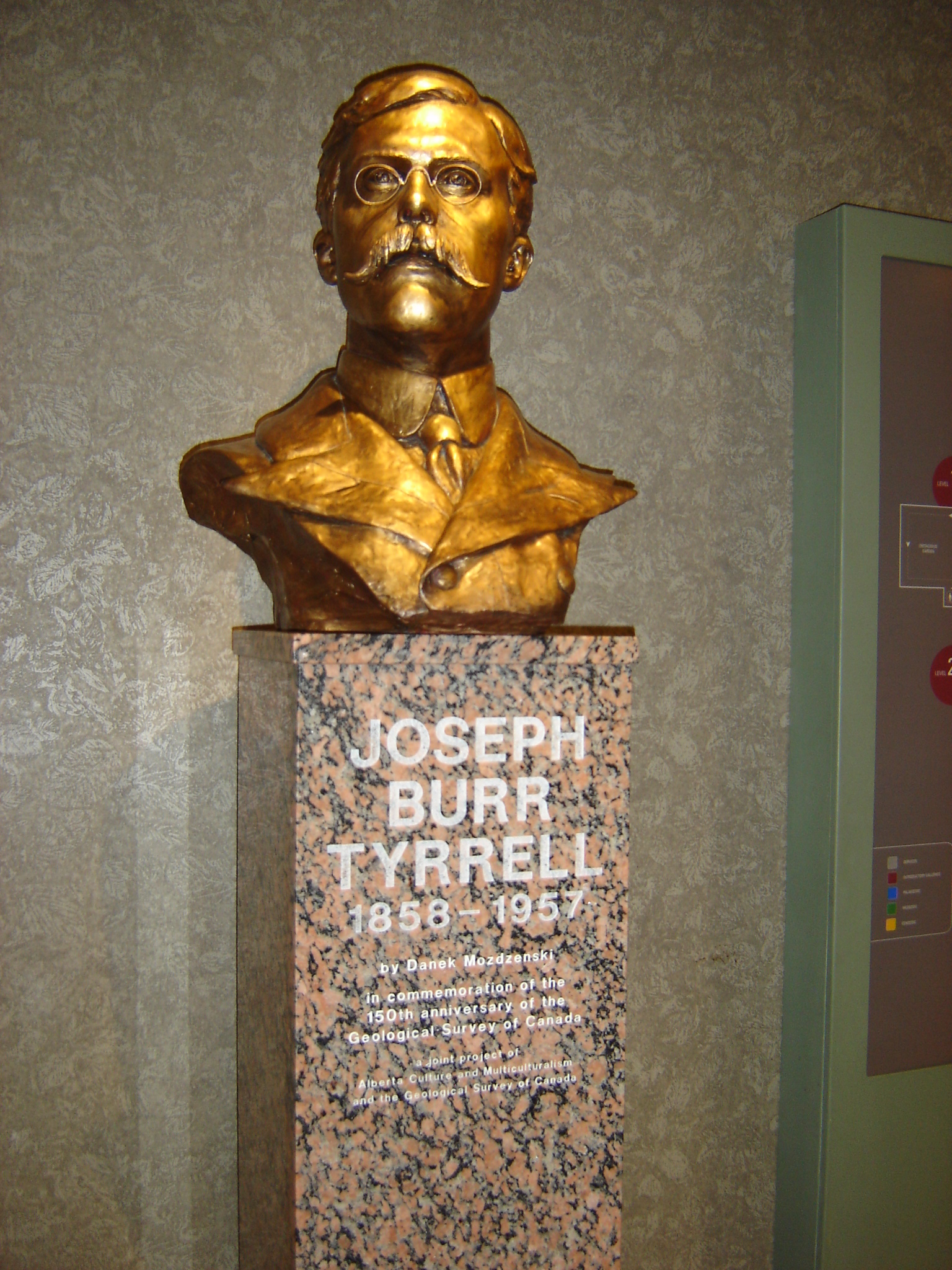
Bust of Tyrrell at the Royal Tyrrell Museum of Palaeontology

=== Places named for Tyrrell ===
- Tyrrell Sea (prehistoric Hudson Bay)
- Tyrrell Arm, the east section of Yathkyed Lake, Nunavut
- Joseph Burr Tyrrell Park, Toronto, Ontario
- Tyrrell Lake, a small alkali lake near Warner, Alberta.

=== Institutions named for Tyrrell ===
- Royal Tyrrell Museum of Palaeontology, Drumheller, Alberta
- J. B. Tyrrell Senior Public School in Scarborough, Ontario
- Joseph Burr Tyrrell Elementary School in Fort Smith, Northwest Territories

=== Awards ===
- 1896 Back Award, Royal Geographical Society
- 1918 Murchison Medal, Geological Society of London
- 1929 Honorary President, Royal Canadian Geographical Society
- 1930 Daly Medal from the American Geographical Society
- 1933 Flavelle Medal, Royal Society of Canada
- 1947 Wollaston Medal, Geological Society of London
- 1954 Professional Engineer's Medal from the Association of Professional Engineers of Ontario
- 1997 Canadian Mining Hall of Fame

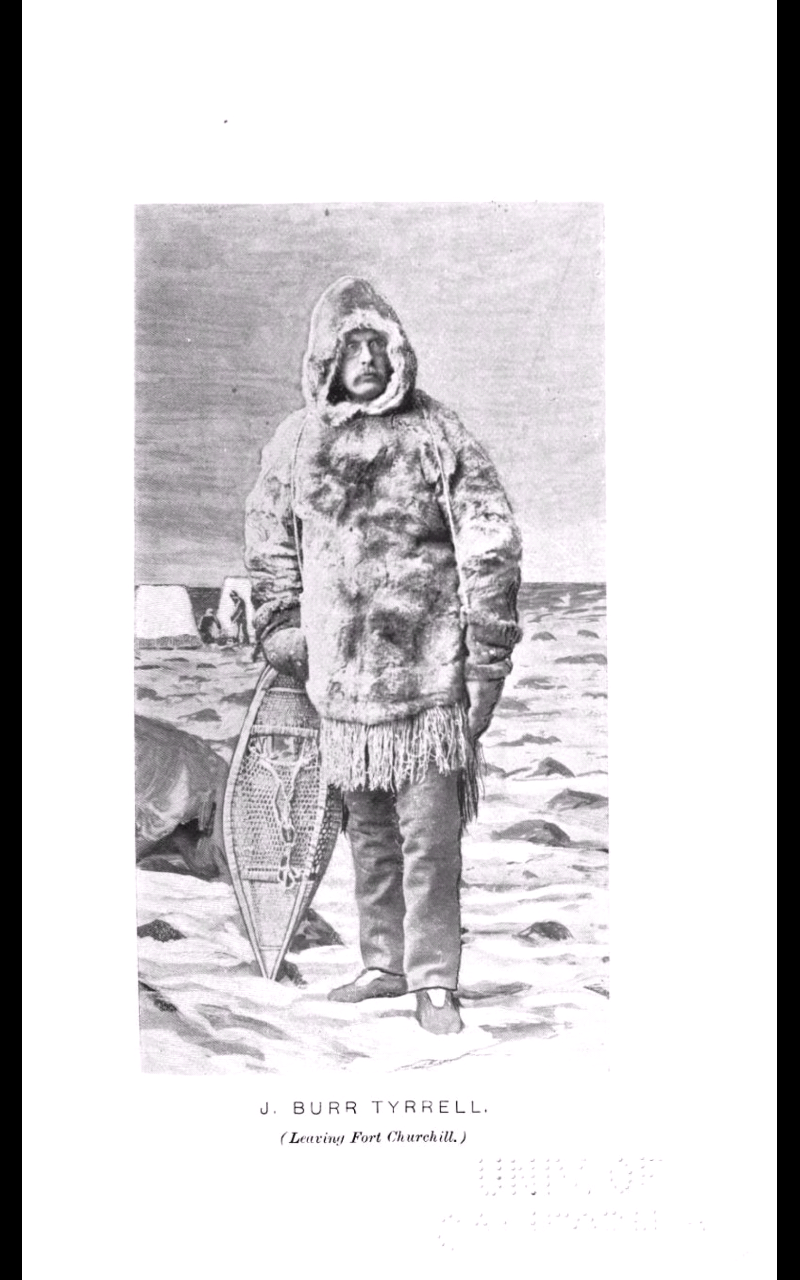

=== Other honours ===
- J.B. Tyrrell Historical Medal, Royal Society of Canada.

== Tribute ==
On 1 November 2018, Google Doodle commemorated his 160th birthday.
