= Churchill Craton =

Geologic region in Canada

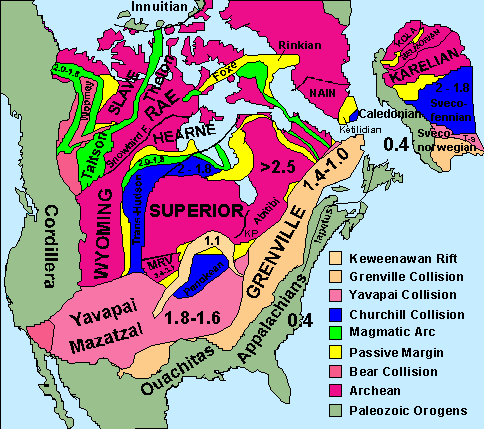
Paleomap of North American and Scandinavian cratons and orogenic belts. The Churchill Craton comprises the Rae and Hearne provinces (both in magenta).

The Churchill Craton is the northwest section of the Canadian Shield and stretches from southern Saskatchewan and Alberta to northern Nunavut. The Archean (ca. 1.83 Ga) Western Churchill province contributes to the complicated and protracted tectonic history of the craton and marks a major change in the behaviour of the Churchill Craton.

== Hearne Domain, Western Churchill province ==
This consists of Archean supracrustal belts that preserve mostly Archean greenschist, hornblende and Proterozoic biotite. This section of the Churchill province was called the Ennadai-Rankin greenstone belt.

== See also ==
- Rae Craton
- Superior Craton
