= Helen Konek =

Inuk elder (1931–2026)

- Born: Helen Agaaqtuq; May 11, 1931; Near the eastern shore of Henik Lake, Northwest Territories, Canada
- Died: July 25, 2026 (aged 95)
- Known for: Appearing in a 1949 photograph by Richard Harrington

Helen Agaaqtuq Konek (May 11, 1931 – July 25, 2026) was an Inuk elder from Arviat, Nunavut. A 1949 photograph of her went viral in 2019.

== Early life ==
Konek was born as Helen Agaaqtuq on May 11, 1931 in a tupiq on the eastern shore of Henik Lake. Helen's father was Piqqanaaq Agaaqtuq and her mother was Paalak Agaaqtuq. She had three brothers: Nanauq, Pukiluk, and Kinaalik. As a child she accompanied her brothers and father on caribou hunting trips, including to Ennadai Lake in the Ahiarmiut's territory.

She was photographed in 1949, aged 17, by Richard Harrington as part of a series taken while he was travelling around the Arctic. The photograph was taken in ᑭᖓᕐᔪᐊᓕᒃ (English: of big hill).

== Adult life ==
By 1952, the Agaaqtuq family were living close to the Padlei trading post. In 1953, Helen started living as a couple with James Konek, the son of a storekeeper in Arviat. They both lived in Arviat in winter and Barren Lands area in the summer. The 1950 Caribou Inuit famine caused Helen's mother Paalak to die in 1957, the rest of the family survived on fish, rabbit, and ptarmigan. The Royal Canadian Mounted Police forcibly displaced the Konek family in 1960 from Padlei to Arviat.

One of Harrington's photographs of Konek entering her igloo was widely shared online in 2019 after her journalist grandson Jordan Konek tweeted it. Konek was an elder, and lived in Arviat, Nunavut.

On July 25, 2026, Konek died at the age of 95.
