= Mary Ayaq Anowtalik =

Inuk artist

- Born: 1938 (age 87–88); Near Ennadai Lake, Northwest Territories, Canada (now in Nunavut)
- Other names: Akjar, Ayaq Anowtalik, Mary Akjar, Mary Aajaaq Anowtalik, Mary Anautalik
- Known for: Stone carvings
- Spouse: Luke Anowtalik

Mary Ayaq Anowtalik (born 1938) is an Inuk artist based in Arviat, Nunavut, Canada, known for her stone carvings.

Her work is included in the collections of the Winnipeg Art Gallery, the Musée national des beaux-arts du Québec, the University of Saskatchewan, and the University of British Columbia Museum of Anthropology.

== Biography ==
Born near Ennadai Lake, Anowtalik is the daughter of sculptor Elizabeth Nutaraaluk and camp leader Andy Aulatjut. Her younger sister died during one of their family's forced relocations as due to a lack of adequate supply of food, her mother was unable to breastfeed.

She began to carve in the 1950s while still living in Ennadai Lake. Describing her carvings, she said:

Figures like these ... represent the closeness of Inuit family and relatives. They portray the intimacy of our former life at Ennadai Lake.

Anowtalik was married to fellow sculptor Luke Anowtalik (1932-2006). They would frequently collaborate on sculptures together. In 1956 she and her husband appeared on the cover of Life Magazine alongside one of her children.

During the Canadian papal visit in 2022, Anowtalik was part of a traditional Inuit throat singing performance for Pope Francis.

== Forced relocation ==
A part of the Ahiarmiut community of what was then the eastern Northwest Territories, Anowtalik alongside other residents were forcibly relocated several times from Ennadai Lake in the 1950s as part of forced relocations by the Canadian government. Of the destruction of her community, she describes:

This thing started plowing all our belongings, everything that we owned [...] I saw our beautiful tent being torn down and then that same bulldozer made a turn and started plowing our fresh dried meat.

During the first relocation in May of 1950, and her community were deposited near Nueltin Lake on the border of what is now Manitoba and Nunavut. The government deposited them to their new environment without food and shelter. Due to the conditions, several members of community died from illness and Anowtalik says they were not able to be buried in the traditional manner due to the lack of resources. After the harsh living conditions became more threatening in the fall, they began a 100km three month long trek back to their community in Ennadai Lake.

In 1957, the Anowtalik's community was again relocated by the Canadian government to the North Henik and Oftedal Lakes in Nunavut.

Anowtalik's community was moved for the final time to Arviat in 1958.

As of the official government settlement in 2018, Anowtalik was the only surviving elder of her community to remember the relocations.
