= Revillon Frères =

French fur and luxury goods company

- Industry: Furs and luxury products
- Founded: 1839
- Founder: Louis-Victor Revillon
- Defunct: 1982
- Headquarters: Paris

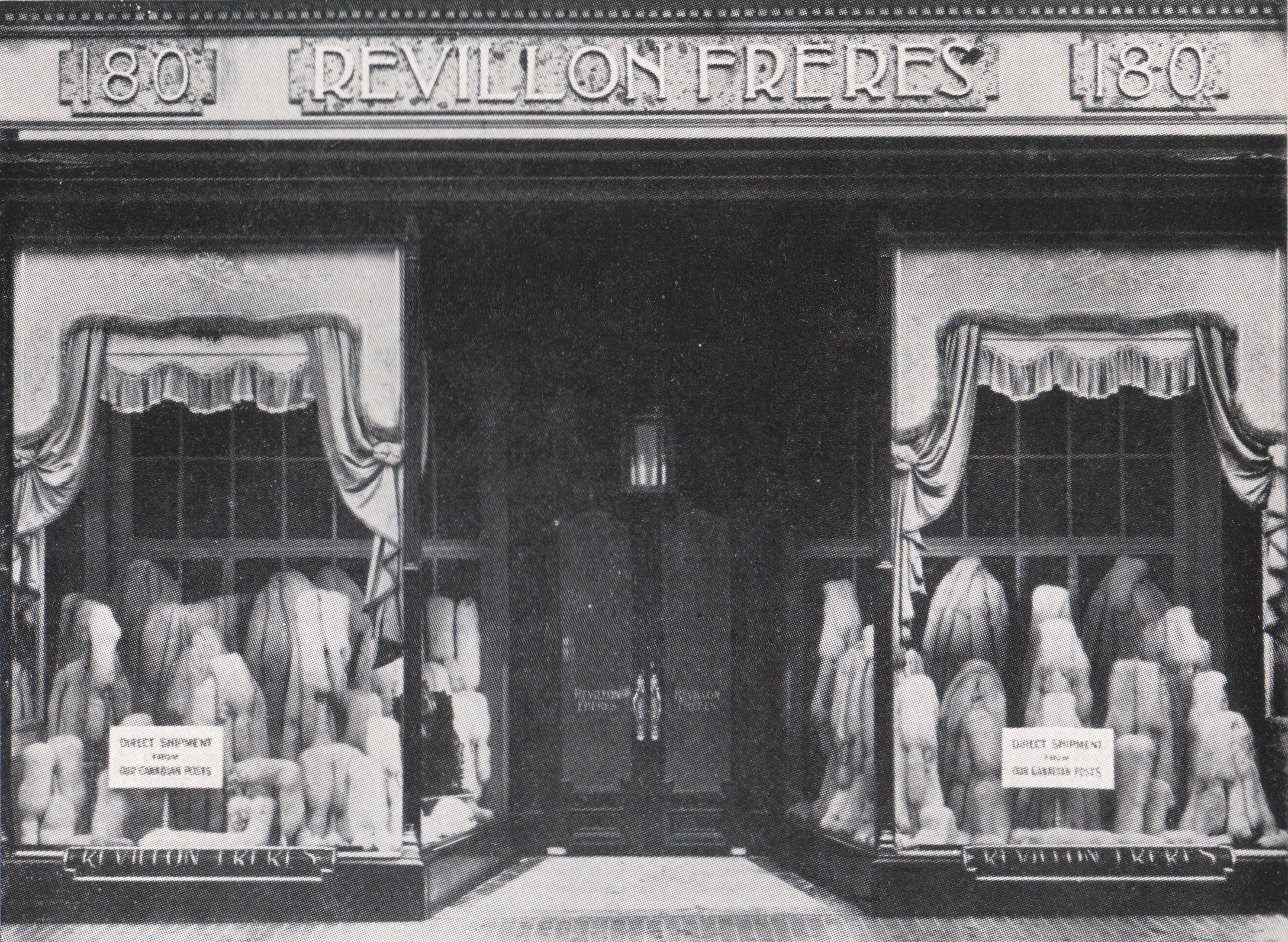
Revillon Frères, 180 Regent Street, London. The sign says: "Direct shipment from our Canadian posts"

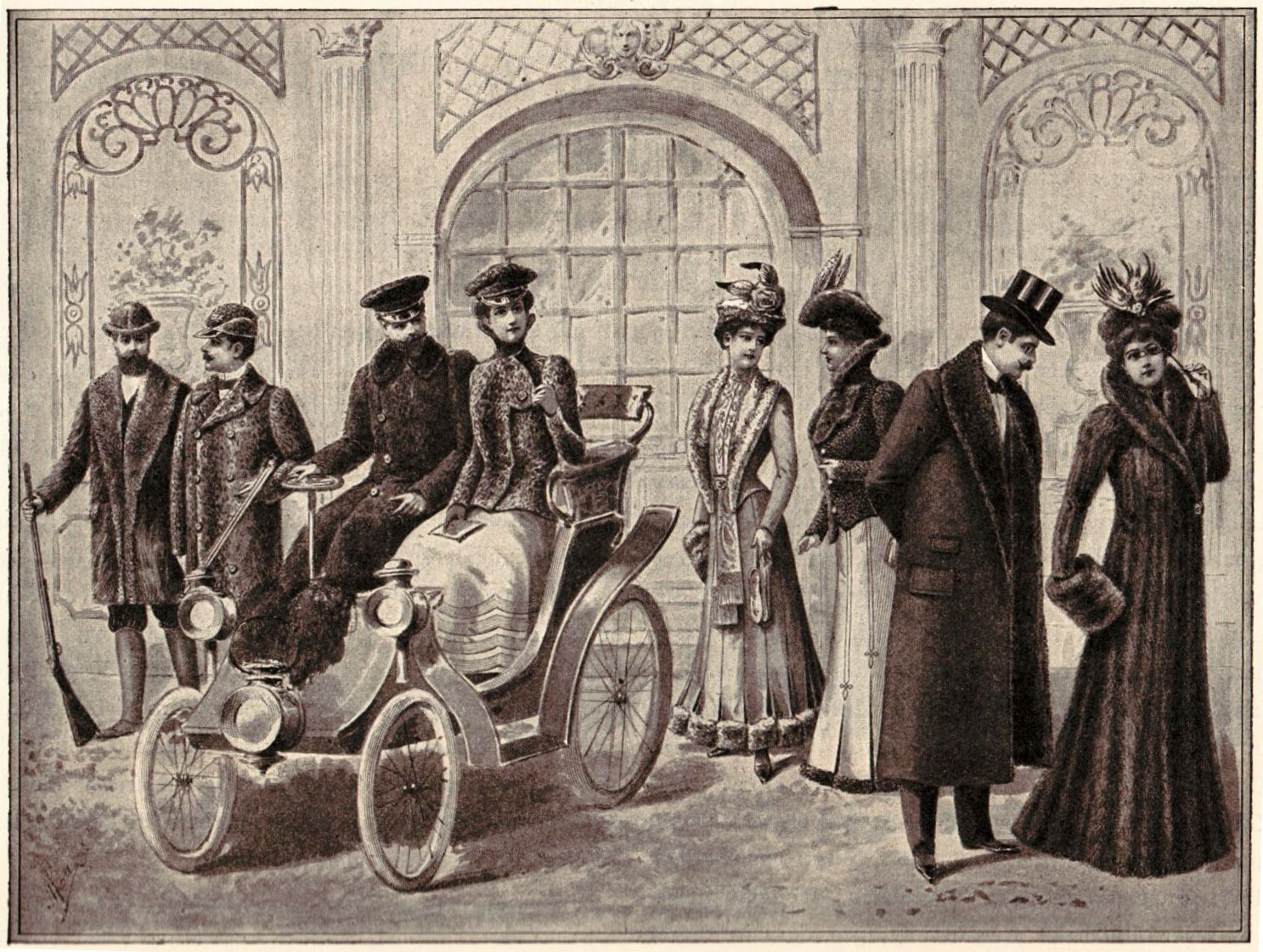
Furs by Revillon Frères at the Exposition Universelle (1900)

Revillon Frères (Revillon Brothers) was a French fur and luxury goods company, founded in Paris in 1723. Then called la Maison Givelet, it was purchased by Louis-Victor Revillon in 1839 and soon, as Revillon Frères, became the largest fur company in France. Branches were opened in London in 1869 and in New York in 1878.

At the end of the 19th century, Revillon had stores in Paris, London, New York City, and Montreal.

Through its fur buying bureau in Leipzig, Germany (1876), and an agency in Moscow (1905), the company bought most of its furs from the markets of Moscow, Leipzig and at the annual fairs in Nizhny Novgorod (Gorki) at the Makaryev Fair and in Irbit at the Irbit Fair.

From 1908-1909 Revillon Frères opened fur trading posts in Siberia, Mongolia and Turkestan. By 1912 Revillon Frères had 125 fur trading posts in America and Siberia.

In the 1960s, Revillon acquired Grauer Furs, New York's preeminent fur manufacturing company. Grauer Furs was founded by Austrian immigrant William Grauer and later operated by Grauer's two sons, Abraham and Herman. In 1970, in a deal negotiated by Herman Grauer, Revillon became the fur supplier to Saks Fifth Avenue. This arrangement lasted until 1995.

In 1982, Revillon was acquired by hypermarket operator Cora, and became its luxury division Cora-Revillon. Subsequently, Cora-Revillon became a separate company, now privately owned, with Revillon as its primary brand. Besides furs, Revillon produces perfume.

== Fur trading operation in Canada (1893–1936) ==
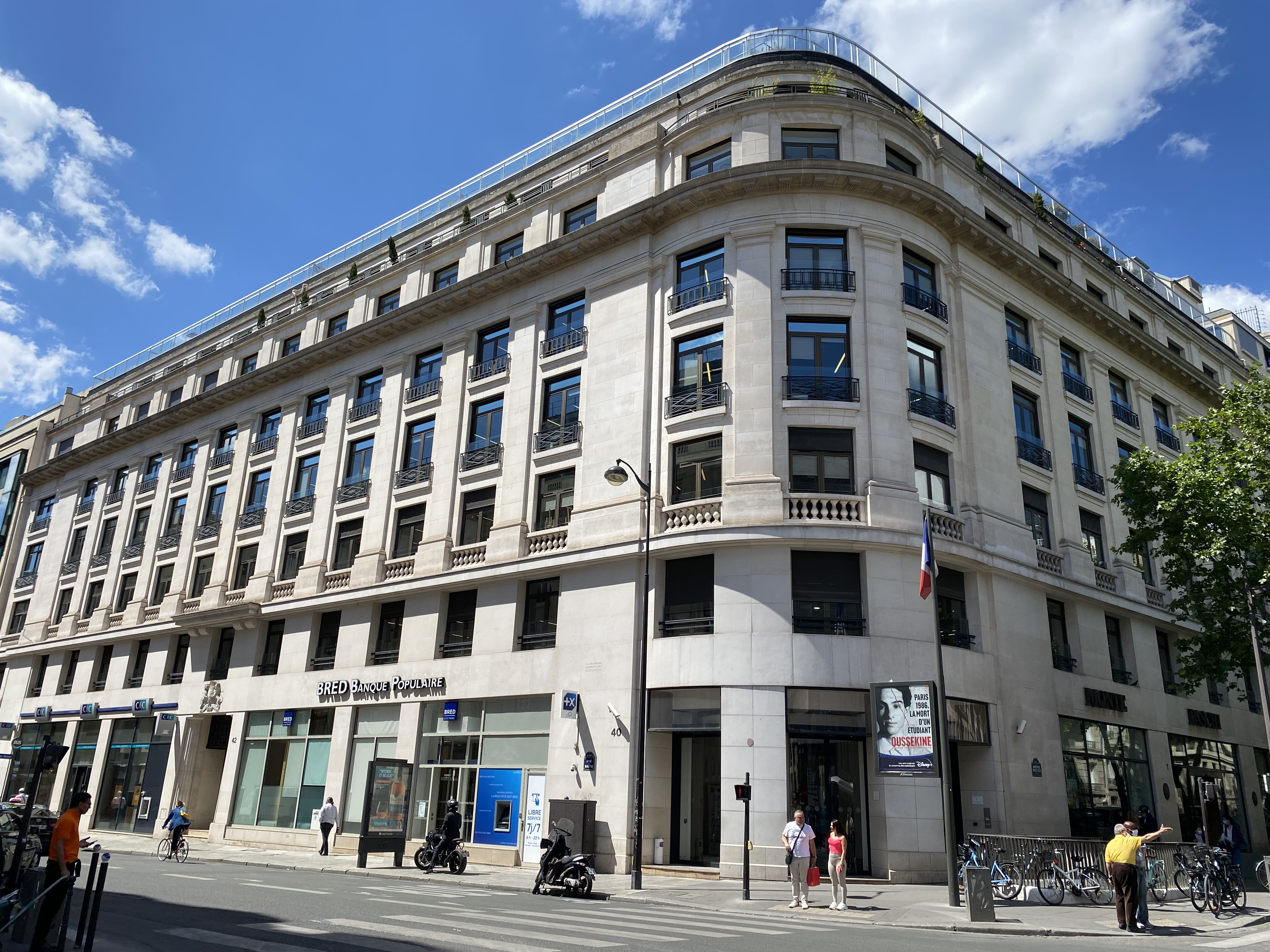
Former headquarters of Etablissements Révillon in Paris at 4, rue La Boétie

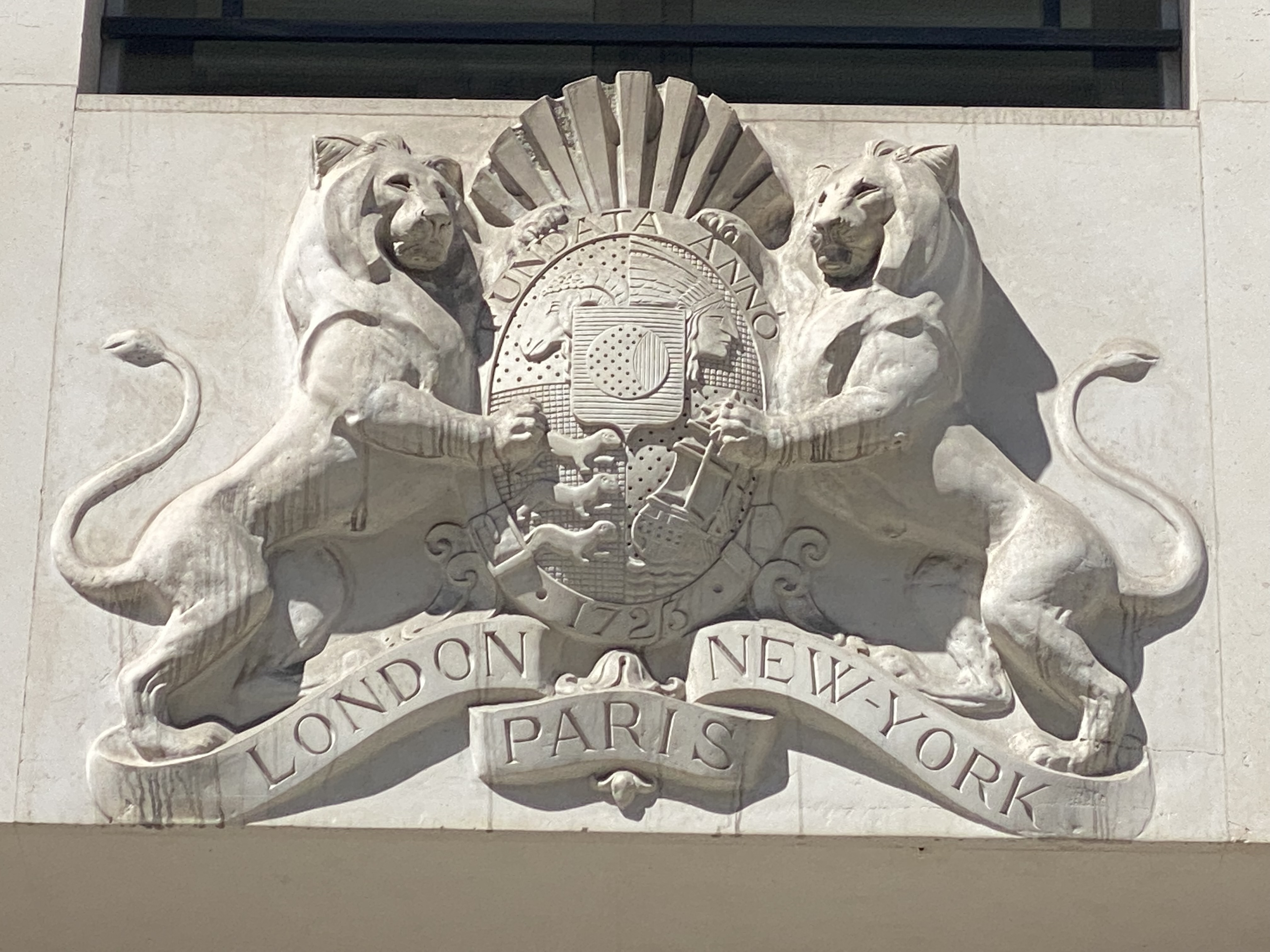
Coat of arms of Etablissements Révillon on the Paris headquarters building

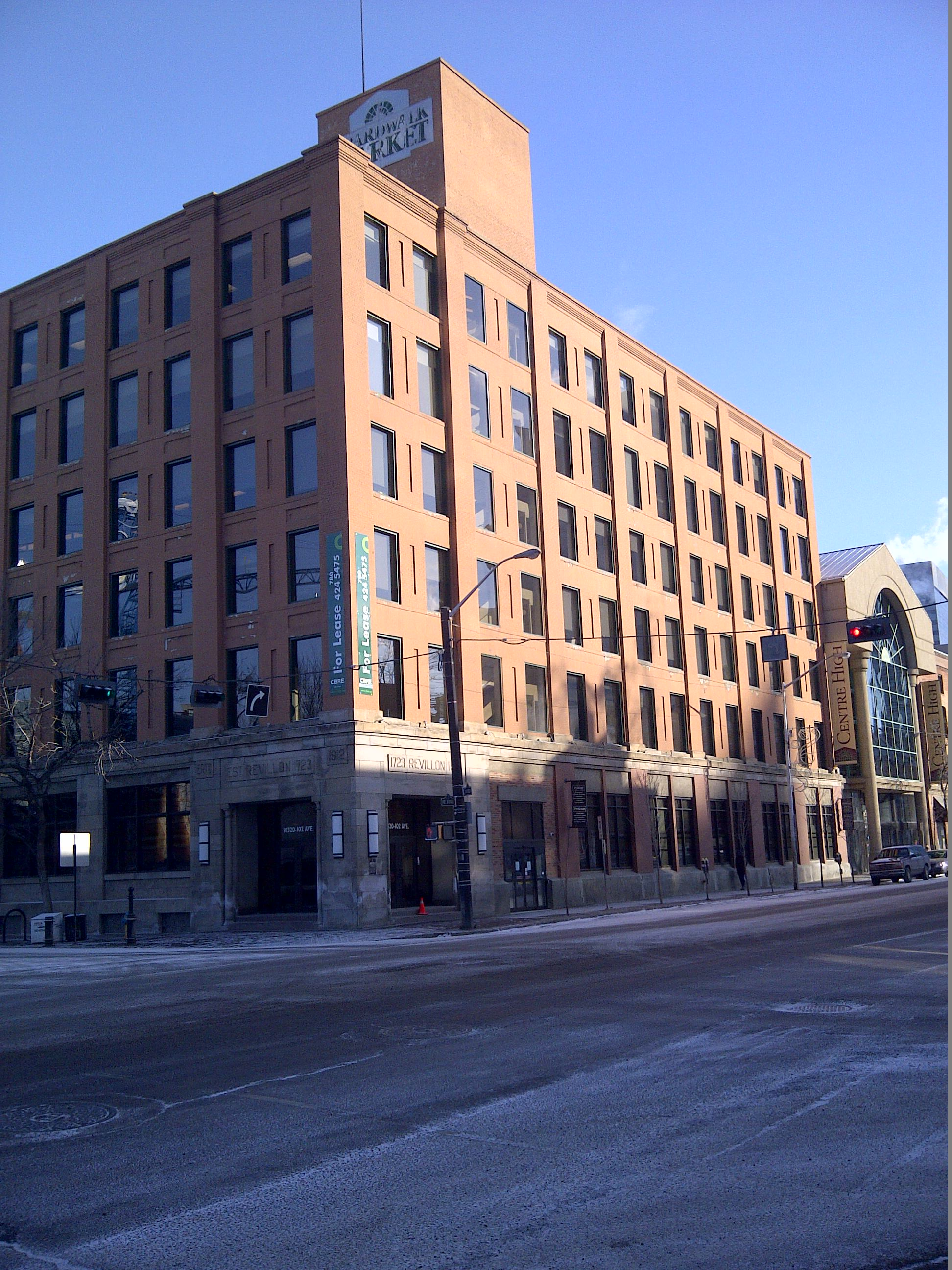
Former headquarters of Revillon Frères in Edmonton - built 1912

In 1899 Revillon Frères opened a wholesale warehouse in Edmonton, Alberta and by 1903 had 23 stores across Canada. Owned by Victor Revillon, Revillon Frères eventually set up a network of fur-trading posts in northern Canada in direct competition with the Hudson's Bay Company (HBC) composed of an eastern division and a western division.

The western division included posts mostly in northern Alberta, Saskatchewan and Manitoba. In 1911 the company had 13 posts north and west of Athabasca Landing. Having acquired a depot in Prince Albert in 1904 they had an additional 10 posts from The Pas to Brochet and Nueltin Lake at the edge of the tundra.

The eastern division was in the region of James Bay and Ungava Bay in the north of Quebec which was served by their own fleet of ships. By 1909, Revillon had forty-eight stores in its Eastern Arctic division while HBC had fifty-two. Many of the Inuit villages in Nunavik, in northern Quebec, Canada, are located on sites originally occupied by Revillon Frères trading posts.

It was incorporated in Canada in 1912 as the Revillon Frères Trading Company Ltd.. In 1926 the Hudson's Bay Company bought 54% of the fur trade company and by 1936 the company was fully owned by the HBC. In 1938 the name was changed to Rupert's Land Trading Company.

Revillon Frères financed Robert Flaherty's 1922 film Nanook of the North, filmed near one of their trading posts at Inukjuak, Quebec on northeastern Hudson Bay, said to be Canada's first documentary.

Ilya Andreyevich Tolstoy, the grandson of count Leo Tolstoy, stayed at the Revillon Frères Post of Windy Lake on Nueltin Lake in the winter of 1928-1929. He was in a group attempting to get film footage of the migrating caribou for the William Douglas Burden and William C. Chanler's production, The Silent Enemy, one of the last and greatest of the silent films, released in 1930.

The Glenbow Museum located in Calgary has a collection of over 300 photographs of the Revillon posts, ships and items sold in their stores. Many of the photographs were taken by Samuel Herbert Coward, the director of the Revillon Frères Trading Company Ltd. in Canada from 1904 to 1931. There is a Revillon Frères Museum in Moosonee, Ontario which has been closed for several years.

=== Revillon Posts in Canada ===
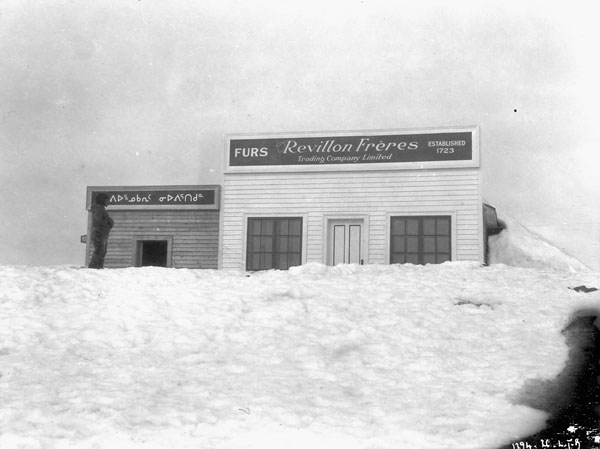
Revillon Frères post, Repulse Bay, Nunavut, June 1926 (Photographer: L.T. Burwash).

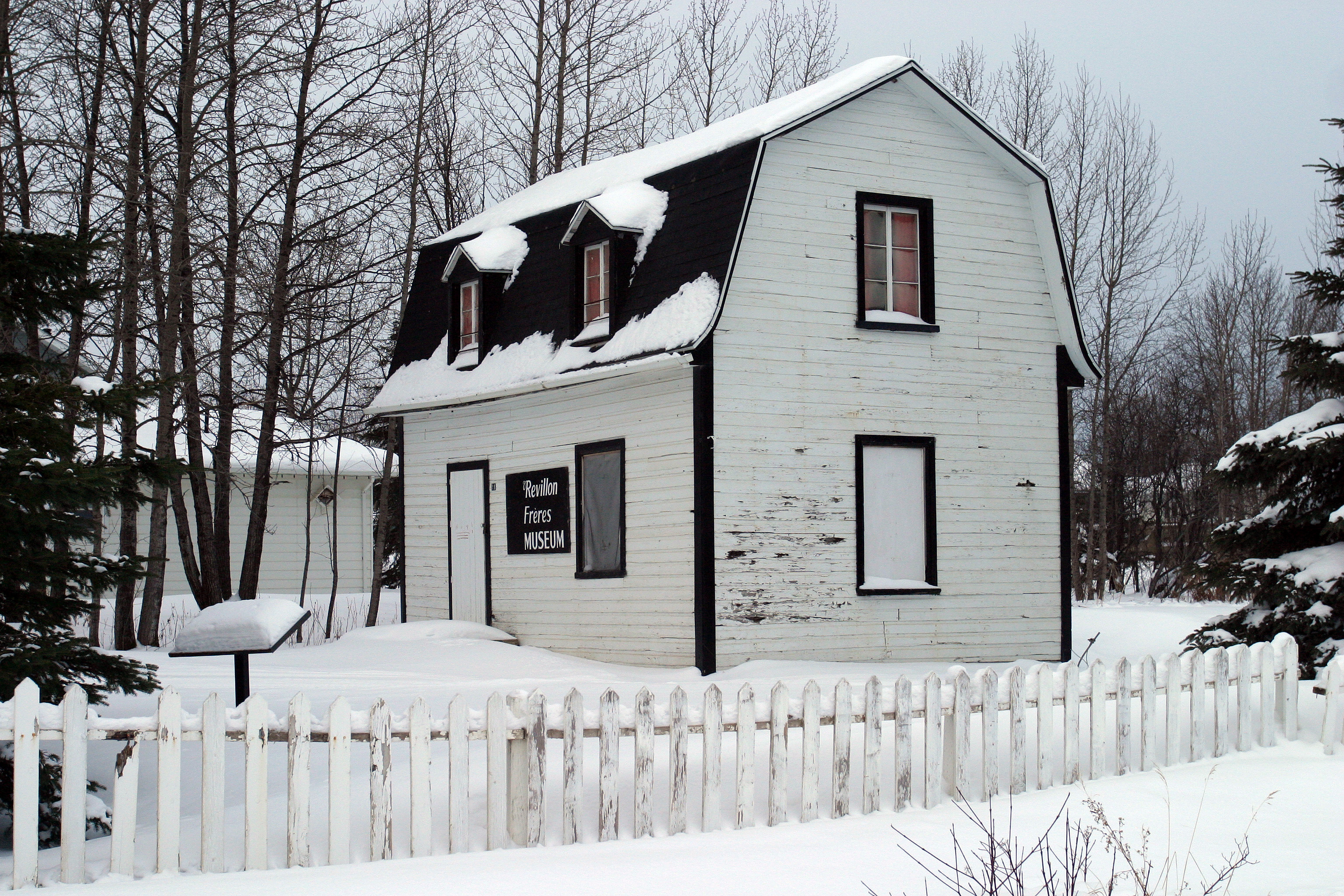
Revillon Frères Museum, Moosonee, Ontario, 9 January 2005, now boarded up

==== Western division ====
- Edmonton, Alberta had a major store and warehouse and was the headquarters and distribution centre for the following posts.
- Athabasca Landing, Alberta
- Grande Prairie, Alberta
- Lesser Slave Lake, Alberta
- Spirit River, Alberta
- Sturgeon Lake (Alberta)
- Peace River Crossing, Alberta
- Peace River, Alberta
- Fort Vermilion, Alberta
- Prairie Lake, Alberta
- Keg River, Alberta
- Wabiscond
- Trout Lake, Alberta
- Hay River, Northwest Territories
- Fort St. John, British Columbia
- Prince Albert, Saskatchewan had a major store and was the headquarters for the following posts.
- Buffalo River, Saskatchewan see Dillon, Saskatchewan
- Clear Lake see Birch Narrows First Nation
- Montreal Lake, Saskatchewan
- La Ronge, Saskatchewan
- Stanley Mission, Saskatchewan
- Île-à-la-Crosse, Saskatchewan
- Souris River see Pinehouse, Saskatchewan
- Green Lake, Saskatchewan
- La Loche, Saskatchewan
- Pelican Narrows, Saskatchewan
- Cumberland House, Saskatchewan
- Pukatawagan, Manitoba
- South Deer Lake at Southend, Saskatchewan
- The Pas (closed 1923)
- Brochet, Manitoba
- Windy Lake Nueltin Lake
- Casimir (Kasmere Lake)

==== Eastern division ====
- Montreal had a major store and was the headquarters and distribution centre for the following posts located on James Bay, Hudson Bay and Labrador (list is incomplete). A fleet of ships, mostly schooners, were purchased to serve these posts.
- Kamousitchonan Lake, James Bay area, Quebec
- Wakeham Bay, Hudson Straight, Quebec
- Fort Chimo, Ungava Bay, Hudson Straight, Quebec
- Stratton Island, James Bay, Quebec
- Port Harrison, Hudson Bay, Quebec
- Fort George, James Bay, Quebec
- Cape Dufferin, Quebec
- Port Harrison, Quebec
- Nemiscau, Quebec
- Rupert House, Quebec
- Wakeham Bay, Quebec
- Kuujjuarapik, Quebec Whale River
- Veenisk
- Attawapiskat First Nation, Ontario
- Fort Albany, Ontario
- Porcupine City, Ontario
- Moose Factory, Ontario Moosonee
- Matheson, Ontario
- Pagwa River, Ontario
- English River, Ontario

==== Revillon boats ====
- Stord steamer
- Violet
- Adventure steamer 2,500 tons
- Albert Revillon three mast schooner
- Jean Revillon renamed Fort James (First ship to circumnavigate North American continent, 1928-29. Owned by Albert and Jean Revillon)
- Emilia schooner
- Annie E. Geele schooner
- Albany power boat
