= Kikkik =

Canadian Inuk woman acquitted of murder

Kikkik was an Inuk woman who in 1958 was charged with, but acquitted of, murder, child neglect and causing the death of one of her children. Her story was told by Farley Mowat.

== Relocation ==
Kikkik was a member of the Ahiarmiut, a Caribou Inuit band who had originally lived in the Ennadai Lake area. In 1949, the Ihalmiut were relocated by the Government of Canada to Nueltin Lake. However, hunting was poor at Nueltin and over time the people returned to Ennadai. In 1957, the Government again moved the Ihalmiut, now numbering 59 people, to the Henik Lake area, 45 miles from Padlei, the closest trading post. The Henik group split in two early on.

== Desperate circumstances ==
During 1957, the Ihalmiut's main source of food, caribou did not appear. Consequently, the Henik group began to starve during the winter. Kikkik, her husband Hallow (Hallauk), and their children (son Karlak; daughters Ailoyoak, Annecatha, Nesha, and baby Nokahhak [Elisapee]) had their igloo close to her half-brother Ootek (Ootuk) and his family. Ootek had not been able to provide for his family. Now Ootek told his wife that he was going to the trading post at Padlei, but went and visited Hallow. Hallow left to go fishing and, after a short period, he was followed by Ootek, who had brought his rifle. Creeping up behind Hallow, who was fishing, Ootek shot him in the back of the head.

Ootek then returned to Kikkik's igloo, but she became suspicious and followed him as he left the igloo. He shot at her but she pushed the rifle aside. She fought with Ootek, who was weak from hunger, and forced him to the ground; he confessed to having murdered Hallow. Sitting on Ootek to hold him down, Kikkik got her son Karlak to give her a knife, but it wasn't sharp enough to kill Ootek. One of her other children then brought her another knife and Kikkik killed Ootek with it.

Kikkik found her dead husband and placed his rifle next to him, as is the Ihalmiut's custom. She loaded up a sled with the few supplies she had, bundled her infant onto her back, and began the 40 mile walk to Padlei with the children. After a few days she met Yahah, Hallow's brother, and she followed him to his camp. She waited there while her brother-in-law went to Padlei. After five days, without food, and no sign of Yahah, she and the children resumed the trek. After a few more days, she was unable to continue with all the children and left Annecatha and Nesha, both under age 10, wrapped in caribou skin, in an igloo she made with a frying pan.

== Rescue and trial ==
Kikkik, Karlak, Ailoyoak, and baby Nokahhak were rescued by a Royal Canadian Mounted Police aircraft that also was able to find the two stranded girls, one of whom had died. Kikkik was charged with the murder of Ootek, child neglect for abandoning Annecatha, and causing the death of Nesha.

At her trial, in Rankin Inlet, presided over by Judge John Sissons, Kikkik was found not guilty of all charges. Sissons, in his remarks to the jury said the case "demands that we revert our thinking to an earlier age and try to understand Kikkik and her life and her land and her society" and that she should be judged by her culture.

== Aftermath ==
Her story was featured in the 1959 book The Desperate People by Farley Mowat. Kikkik never talked about this part of her life, nor did community elders. Her children did not learn of it until Annecatha read Mowat's book. Kikkik's story was also turned into the documentary film Kikkik, which was released in both English and Inuktitut versions by director Ole Gjerstad and Kikkik's daughter Elisapee Karetak.

== Sources ==
- Damas, David. Arctic Migrants/Arctic Villagers The Transformation of Inuit Settlement in the Central Arctic. Montreal: McGill-Queen's University Press, 2002. ISBN 0-7735-2405-3
- Eber, Dorothy. Images of Justice A Legal History of the Northwest Territories As Traced Through the Yellowknife Courthouse Collection of Inuit Sculpture. McGill-Queen's native and northern series, 28. Montreal: McGill-Queen's University Press, 1997. ISBN 0-7735-1675-1
- Tester, Frank J., and Peter Keith Kulchyski. Tammarniit (Mistakes) Inuit Relocation in the Eastern Arctic, 1939-63. Vancouver: UBC Press, 1994. ISBN 978-0-7748-0452-3
- Kikkik, When Justice Was Done
