= Robert Bone (disambiguation) =

Robert Bone (1924–2007) was a scholar of African-American literature and a professor of English.

Robert Bone may also refer to:

- Robert Martin Bone (born 1933), Canadian geographer and textbook author
- Robert Trewick Bone (1790–1840), English painter
- Robert Bone, poker player at the 1980 World Series of Poker
