= Joy Kiluvigyuak Hallauk =

Inuk artist

- Born: 1940; Padlei, Kivalliq, Nunavut
- Died: 2000 (aged 59–60); Arviat, Kivalliq, Nunavut
- Spouse: Luke Hallauk

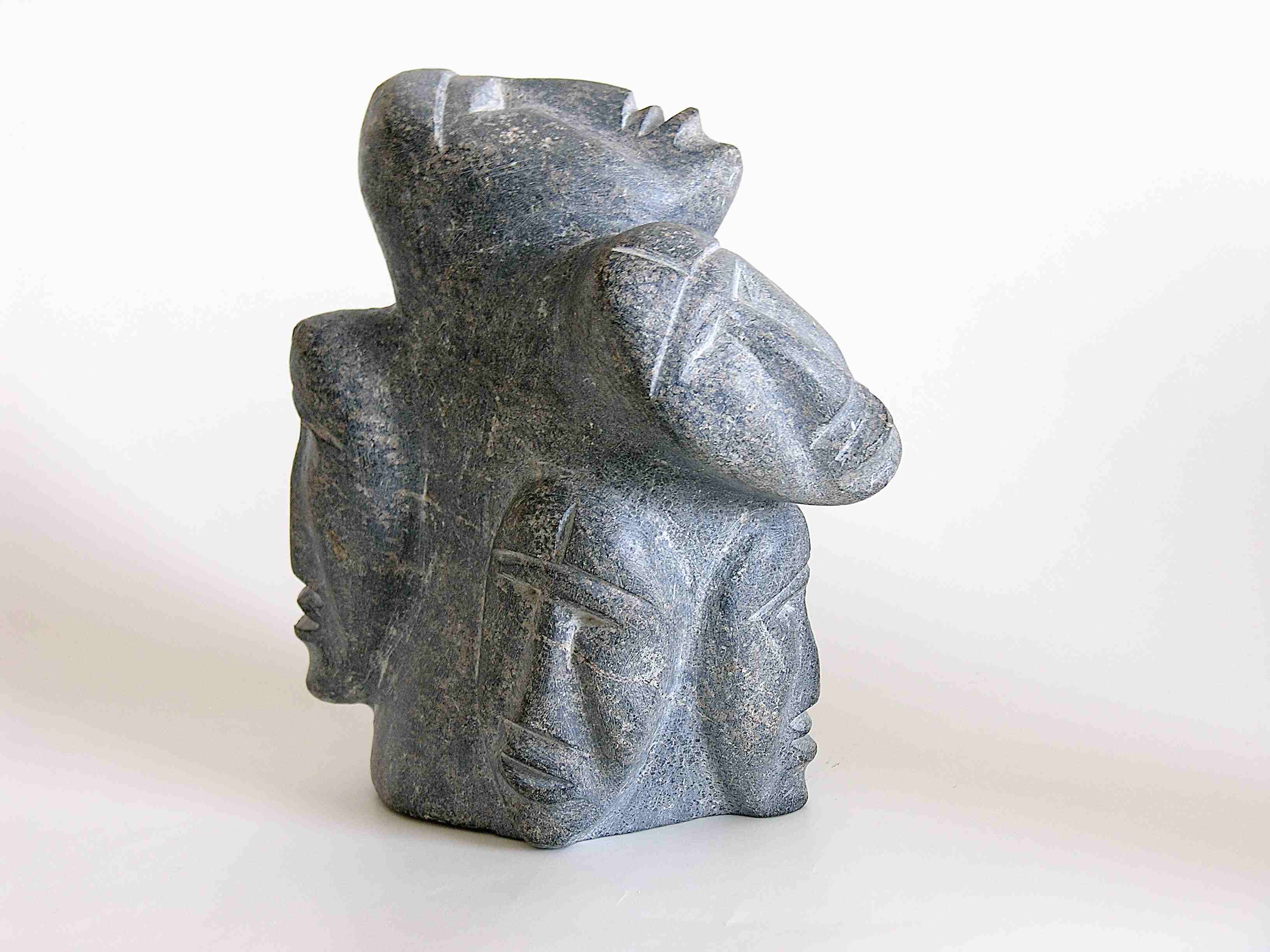
Köpfe (Niaquit), Serpentine (1994), by Joy Kiluvigyuak Hallauk

Joy Kiluvigyuak Hallauk (1940–2000) was a multidisciplinary Inuk artist that was based in Arivat, Nunavut.

Her work is included in the collections of the Musée national des beaux-arts du Québec, National Museum of the American Indian, Canadian Museum of History, Winnipeg Art Gallery, and New Brunswick Museum.

== Biography ==
Hallauk and her family were moved to the community of Arivat in 1954 where she later married Luke Hallauk.

She started stone carving in 1963 or 1964 by observing sculpture John Attok and artist Gabriel Gély.

Hallauk began to produce dolls and wall hangings around 1970.
