= Ennadai =

Uninhabited community in Nunavut, Canada

- Ghost town
- Location Ennadai (Canada)
- Coordinates: 61°08′N 100°53′W
- Country: Canada
- Territory: Nunavut
- Region: Kivalliq

Ennadai is a formerly populated place in the Kivalliq Region, Nunavut, Canada. Located on a peninsula that juts into northeastern Ennadai Lake, it faces an unnamed island. It is 450 km (280 mi) northwest of Churchill, Manitoba and 365 km (227 mi) west of Arviat. Ennadai and the surrounding area has been the traditional home of the Ahiarmiut (Ihalmiut), a Caribou Inuit band.

The Ennadai Lake Meteorological Aeronautical Presentation System, a former weather station at this locale, consisted of four buildings. The Royal Canadian Corps of Signals operated a base, Ennadai Lake Radio Station, (VEJ) at Ennadai from the summer of 1949 until 18 September 1954 when it was turned over to the Department of Transportation. An INCO Exploration Camp existed at Ennadai at about the same time.

== Climate ==
Ennadai has a subarctic climate (Köppen climate classification Dfc).

Climate data for Ennadai Lake (Ennadai) Location ID: N/A; coordinates 61°08′N 100°54′W; elevation: 325 m (1,066 ft); (1951−1980 normals, extremes 1949-1979)
Month	Jan	Feb	Mar	Apr	May	Jun	Jul	Aug	Sep	Oct	Nov	Dec	Year
Record high °C (°F)	−2.8 (27.0)	0.6 (33.1)	3.3 (37.9)	10.6 (51.1)	25.0 (77.0)	28.9 (84.0)	31.7 (89.1)	28.3 (82.9)	26.7 (80.1)	16.7 (62.1)	4.4 (39.9)	1.1 (34.0)	31.7 (89.1)
Mean daily maximum °C (°F)	−27.0 (−16.6)	−24.8 (−12.6)	−18.8 (−1.8)	−7.7 (18.1)	1.7 (35.1)	12.2 (54.0)	17.7 (63.9)	15.7 (60.3)	7.1 (44.8)	−1.9 (28.6)	−13.4 (7.9)	−21.9 (−7.4)	−5.1 (22.8)
Daily mean °C (°F)	−30.9 (−23.6)	−29.1 (−20.4)	−23.8 (−10.8)	−13.1 (8.4)	−2.7 (27.1)	7.2 (45.0)	13.0 (55.4)	11.5 (52.7)	3.9 (39.0)	−5.0 (23.0)	−17.3 (0.9)	−25.8 (−14.4)	−9.3 (15.3)
Mean daily minimum °C (°F)	−34.8 (−30.6)	−33.4 (−28.1)	−28.7 (−19.7)	−18.4 (−1.1)	−7.1 (19.2)	2.1 (35.8)	8.2 (46.8)	7.2 (45.0)	0.7 (33.3)	−8.1 (17.4)	−21.2 (−6.2)	−29.6 (−21.3)	−13.6 (7.5)
Record low °C (°F)	−49.4 (−56.9)	−50.3 (−58.5)	−45.6 (−50.1)	−38.3 (−36.9)	−29.3 (−20.7)	−8.3 (17.1)	−1.1 (30.0)	−1.7 (28.9)	−11.1 (12.0)	−34.7 (−30.5)	−42.5 (−44.5)	−45.0 (−49.0)	−50.3 (−58.5)
Average precipitation mm (inches)	10.3 (0.41)	6.4 (0.25)	11.7 (0.46)	15.3 (0.60)	19.6 (0.77)	30.7 (1.21)	51.9 (2.04)	41.7 (1.64)	44.7 (1.76)	33.2 (1.31)	16.4 (0.65)	12.6 (0.50)	294.5 (11.59)
Average rainfall mm (inches)	0.0 (0.0)	trace	0.0 (0.0)	0.5 (0.02)	10.4 (0.41)	27.5 (1.08)	51.9 (2.04)	41.6 (1.64)	34.3 (1.35)	7.4 (0.29)	0.1 (0.00)	trace	173.7 (6.84)
Average snowfall cm (inches)	9.6 (3.8)	6.3 (2.5)	11.9 (4.7)	14.4 (5.7)	8.5 (3.3)	3.1 (1.2)	trace	trace	9.1 (3.6)	25.2 (9.9)	16.3 (6.4)	12.7 (5.0)	117.1 (46.1)
Average precipitation days (≥ 0.2 mm)	9	7	9	9	9	9	12	12	13	15	13	10	127
Average rainy days (≥ 0.2 mm)	0	0	0	trace	4	8	12	12	10	3	trace	0	49
Average snowy days (≥ 0.2 cm)	9	7	9	9	6	2	0	trace	4	13	13	10	82
Average relative humidity (%)	74	73	75	80	79	65	62	67	79	86	81	75	75
Average dew point °C (°F)	−31.5 (−24.7)	−29.8 (−21.6)	−25.7 (−14.3)	−13.6 (7.5)	−4.0 (24.8)	3.0 (37.4)	7.7 (45.9)	6.9 (44.4)	1.1 (34.0)	−6.6 (20.1)	−20.0 (−4.0)	−28.7 (−19.7)	−11.8 (10.8)
Source: Environment and Climate Change Canada (temperature) (precipitation) (humidity and dew point)

== See also ==
- List of communities in Nunavut
