= Luke Anowtalik =

Canadian Inuk sculptor

- Born: 1932
- Died: 2006
- Other names: Anautalik, Anowtelik, Annowtalik
- Known for: Graphic Arts, Sculpture
- Spouse: Mary Ayaq Anowtalik

Luke Anowtalik (1932 - 2006) was an Inuk artist based in Arviat, Nunavut.

His work is included in the collections of the Winnipeg Art Gallery, and National Gallery of Canada.

== Biography ==
Anowtalik was born near Ennadai Lake, Nunavut in 1932. After he and his younger sister Kunee (Rita) lost their parents to starvation, they were relocated to Churchill, Manitoba by trapper Charlie Schweder. Luke and Rita's story is shared in the book No Man's River by Farley Mowat.

Two years after the relocation, Anowtalik trekked by dogsled by himself back to Ennadai Lake where he was rescued by the family of Andy Aulatjut. Anowtalik married Aulajut's daughter Mary Ayaq Anowtalik and the two were featured on the cover of Life Magazine's February 27th, 1956 issue with one of their children.

Anowtalik and his family were forcibly displaced by the Canadian government to Nueltin Lake in May of 1950, to Hennik Lake in 1957, and later to Arviat in 1959.

He began carving in 1962 when the arts movement began in Arviat. Anowtalik frequently collaborated on sculptures with his wife.
