= Elizabeth Nutaraluk Aulatjut =

Inuk sculptor (1914–1998)

- Born: 1914; Ennadai Lake, Kivalliq (Nunavut)
- Died: 1998 (aged 83–84); Arviat, Nunavut

Elizabeth Nutaraluk Aulatjut (1914 – 1998) was an Inuk sculptor.

Aulatjut was born in 1914, near Ennadai Lake, Nunavut, and was a member of the Ahiarmiut. Her family moved to Arviat in 1957 where she lived until her death in 1998.

Her work is included in the collections of the Musée national des beaux-arts du Québec the University of Winnipeg and the McMichael Canadian Art Collection.
