= P. G. Downes =

American school teacher and author

Prentice G. "Spike" Downes (1909–1959) was an American school teacher and author, who traveled by canoe to explore the Great Barren Lands and learn the ways of the Cree and Dene people. Downes' journals record a disappearing people, and a landscape unknown to all but the Canadian natives at that time. His daughter Annie Downes Catterson said of him that he traveled a great distance "in order to learn the things of long ago."

== Biography ==
Downes was born in New Haven, Connecticut in 1909, the son of an Episcopal clergyman. He graduated from Kent School in Kent, Connecticut in 1928 and subsequently from Harvard University. He made his first trip to the far north in 1936. When Downes was not traveling, he lived and taught in Concord, Massachusetts

On his trips, he kept detailed journals in which he recorded not only daily events, but also the stories and traditions of the Cree and Dene people. In 1939, Downes, with his companion, John, from the Brabant Lake area ascended the Cochrane River starting at the town of Brochet on Reindeer Lake, without maps, and depending solely upon the words of the local Cree Indians to find his way to the Thlewiaza River and his final destination, the Hudson Bay outpost on Nueltin Lake. Based on this trip, Downes wrote the classic canoe adventure book, Sleeping Island.

== Bibliography ==
- Downes, P. G. (1943). Sleeping Island: A Journey to the Edge of the Barrens. New York: Coward-McCann. (2006 paperback, Heron Dance Press, ISBN 1-933937-03-3)
- Downes, P. "Prentice Downs eastern arctic journal 1936, edited and introduced by R.H. Cockburn." Arctic 36 (3) 232-250 1983. http://pubs.aina.ucalgary.ca/arctic/Arctic36-3-232.pdf accessed April 27, 2009.
- Cockburn, RH "Prentice G. Downs 1909-1959" Arctic 35 (3) 448

== Other Links ==
- Trent University Archives include a small archives of notebook typescripts. Finding aid available.
- Library Archives Canada | Bibliothèque et Archives Canada (LAC/BAC) contain related materials, including diaries of Robert Hunt
