= Kikkik (film) =

- Directed by: Ole Gjerstad
- Produced by: Ole Gjerstad
- Starring: Elisapee Karetak
- Release date: April 6, 2000
- Country: Canada
- Language: English

Kikkik is a Canadian television documentary film, directed by Ole Gjerstad and released in 2000. The film depicts the story of Kikkik, an Inuk woman who was placed on trial in 1958 for criminal negligence after killing her brother in self-defense when he tried to murder her, and then being forced to abandon some of her children when she travelled to the trading post at Padlei to obtain help.

The film is told from the perspective of Elisapee Karetak, one of Kikkik's daughters.

It debuted on April 6, 2000, as the first episode of Through Her Eyes, a new WTN series of documentary films about women in Canada. An Inuktitut-language edition of the film was also released in 2002.

The film was a nominee for the Donald Brittain Award for best social or political television documentary at the 15th Gemini Awards in 2000.
