= Ahiarmiut =

Group of inland Inuit in Nunavut, Canada

The Ahiarmiut ᐃᓴᓪᒥᐅᑦ [ihalmiˈut] or Ihalmiut ("People from Beyond") or ("the Out-of-the-Way Dwellers") are a group of inland Inuit who lived along the banks of the Kazan River, Ennadai Lake, and Little Dubawnt Lake (renamed Kamilikuak), as well as north of Thlewiaza River ("Big River"), in northern Canada's Keewatin Region of the Northwest Territories, now the Kivalliq Region ("Barren Lands") of present-day Nunavut.

Through three decades of research by David Serkoak, an Ahiarmiut elder, who was a child when his family was repeatedly relocated from Ennadai Lake by the federal government under then-prime ministers Louis St. Laurent and John Diefenbaker, the story of the Ahiarmiut and their search for justice has been shared. For ten years, starting in 1949, as part of a northern policy regarding Inuit communities, the Ahiarmiut were relocated to Nueltin Lake, then Henik Lake, and Whale Cove, among other places. In 2018, the Ahiarmiut and the Canadian government came to a settlement agreement of $5 million for forced relocations.

== Inland Inuit ==
The Ahiarmiut, who are Kivallirmiut (barren-ground caribou hunters), are inland Inuit who were also "known as the ("People from Beyond" or "the Out-of-the-Way Dwellers").

Until 1957, their home was in the region of Ennadai Lake. Ahiarmiut were Caribou Inuit, an inland-dwelling people in the Barren Lands region, whose subsistence centred on hunting barren-ground caribou. The Ahiarmiut "subsisted almost entirely on caribou year-round, unlike other Inuit groups that depended at least partially on harvest of animals from the sea."

=== History ===
During Joseph Tyrrell's Barren Lands expeditions of 1893 and 1894 on behalf of the Geological Survey of Canada, he reported that there were approximately 2,000 Caribou Inuit, then known as Eskimo.

By 1934, Ahiarmiut numbered 80, with 11 considered as heads of families. Their contact with Europeans was limited, but included Hudson's Bay Company's post managers at the company's Windy Post, located in 1936 on a portion of Windy River called Simmons Lake and later moved to Nueltin Lake. Ahiarmiut traded their outer parkas, deerskin boots, and fur pelts at the post for guns, ammunition, and tea. Chipewyan and Métis traded here as well.

In their 1994 publication, Tammarniit (Mistakes), Inuit Relocation in the Eastern Arctic, 1939-63, F.J. Tester and Peter Kulchyski accessed archival documents, including the Alex Stevenson Collection, which had been in storage in the Archives of the Northwest Territories, many of which had not been previously available to researchers. They wrote that the Inuit whose camp was located on the Kazan River near Ennadai Lake and hunted caribou between Kazan River and Nueltin Lake, were known as Ennadai Lake Inuit. They hunted caribou between Kazan River and Nueltin Lake. In the summer of 1956 there were 30 men and women and 25 children. Twelve of the children were under five years old.

== Relocation ==
In the late mid-20th century, the Ahiarmiut suffered a series of relocations. These were sponsored by the federal government in order to "clear the land for government operations and to centralize Inuit populations under government control and surveillance".

- 1949, Ahiarmiut were relocated against their will from Ennadai Lake to Nueltin Lake, but the relocation did not last as hunting was poor, precipitating the band's return to Ennadai Lake.
- In May 1957, Ahiarmiut were airlifted from Ennadai Lake to Henik Lake, 72 km (45 mi) from the Padlei trading post, a distance considered reasonable by the Government of Canada. Many Ahiarmiut starved.
- Later in 1957, Ahiarmiut were moved to Whale Cove where some began carving figurines for income.
- In 1958, 29 Ahiarmiut went to Padlei because of its trading post, 39 were at Yathkyed Lake, and the majority were brought to Eskimo Point, now Arviat, by the Royal Canadian Mounted Police.
- In 1959, the Padlei trading post closed, and the remaining Ahiarmiut were relocated to Arviat.

== Apology by the Government of Canada ==
In 2018 the Ahiarmiut and the Canadian government came to a settlement agreement of $5 million for forced relocations of the Ahiarmiut between 1949 and 1959. On January 22, 2019, the Canadian Government formally apologized to 21 survivors and their families in Arviat. Nunavut. Minister of Crown-Indigenous Relations Carolyn Bennett delivered the apology in the community, saying the forced relocations were because of a "colonial mindset" and caused "indignity, starvation and death":

This apology is a tribute to their spirits and their memories. It is also an opportunity for all Canadians to learn about and reflect upon a dark chapter in our history. I humbly and sincerely offer these words to all Ahiarmiut past and present. We are sorry.

Bennett also apologized for the amount of time it took to get an apology—when the legal claim was first filed, 27 relocated Ahiarmiut were still alive, at the time of the apology there were only 21.

== Media coverage ==
A photo of Stephen Angulalik and his wives appeared in Life magazine, in October 1937. An Ennadai Lake consisting of Mary Ayaq Anowtalik and Luke Anowtalik family were on the cover of the February 27, 1956, issue of Life magazine, with the caption "Stone Age Survivors", selected by the magazine as representing the most primitive of the Canadian Inuit. (King, 1998).

Decades later, Ahiarmiut again gained attention in Ihalmio Elisapee (née Nurrahaq) Karetak's 2000 (English) and 2002 (Inuktitut) documentaries about her people's struggle and starvation during their 1950s relocation and the story of her mother Kikkik at Henik Lake.

== Farley Mowat's "creative non-fiction" ==
The writings of Farley Mowat, who was not a historian, has been described as "creative non-fiction." Mowat, who advocated for the "people of the deer", was a popular, though controversial figure, who admitted that facts were not as important as the story itself. (Note: Globe and Mail obituary: "He was frequently criticized for playing fast and loose with facts in order to create compelling stories. At the International Festival of Authors in Toronto, Mowat once declared: “F–k the facts. The truth is what is important.") Four of Mowat's books were inspired by the Ahiarmiut. He wrote the first, People of the Deer in 1952, shortly after a field trip to the Canadian Arctic while attending the University of Toronto. He wrote The Desperate People in 1959, Death of a People—the Ihalmiut in 1975, Walking on the Land in 2001, (Note: Mowat revisited the Ihalmiut and wrote his follow-up book Walking on the Land, in which he criticized the federal government, the Royal Canadian Mounted Police, and Catholic missionaries.) and No Man's River in 2004.

In their 1994 book Tammarniit (Mistakes), F. J. Tester and Peter Kulchyski acknowledge contributions to Ennadai Lake people's history by Farley Mowat, but they note that although some of his statements may be accurate, his books cite no sources and therefore they use only archival material for their book.

Mowat misspelled the name Ahiarmiut as Ihalmiut.
