= 1950 Caribou Inuit famine =

Famine in Canada in the 1950s

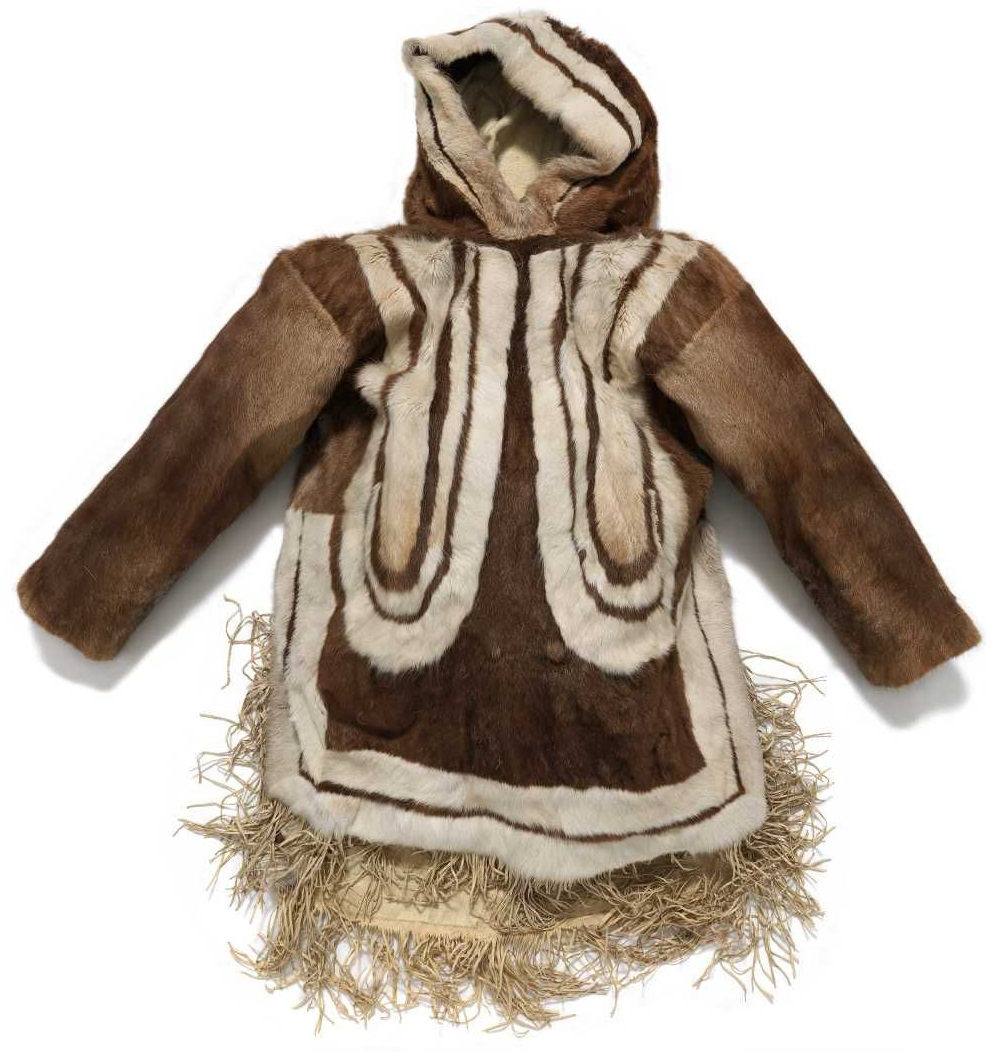
- A traditional Inuit caribou parka made from the skin of a caribou with the fur on the outside, which shows one of the ways caribou provided for Inuit
- Country: Canada
- Location: District of Keewatin, now Kivalliq Region
- Period: 1950
- Total deaths: ~60

The 1950 Canadian caribou famine happened when a change in caribou migration patterns caused widespread death in the southern interior of the District of Keewatin, Northwest Territories, now the Kivalliq Region, Nunavut, in the west of Canada's Hudson Bay. The resulting famine wiped out half of the impacted Caribou Inuit communities.

== Historical background ==
The Caribou Inuit were hunters of caribou in these regions and relied on caribou to supply food, shelter and clothing for their communities. The Caribou Inuit used caribou skin to make parkas to keep themselves warm in frigid climates. They were very careful to make use of every part of the caribou, which was known to be very durable. Due to overhunting and a combination of changing migration patterns and herd distribution, the population of caribou in this region declined vastly.

== Blaming the victims ==
During this time period, the Caribou Inuit were blamed for the declining caribou population, being faced with allegations of being wasteful and overkilling. In the early 1950s the Canadian media reported the starvation deaths of 60 Caribou Inuit.

== Government reaction ==
The government was slow to act but in 1959 moved the surviving 60, of around the 120 that were alive in 1950, to settlements such as Baker Lake and Eskimo Point, now Arviat. This set off an Arctic settlement push by the Canadian government where those Inuit living in the north were encouraged to abandon their traditional way of life and settle in villages and outposts of the Canadian North.

After being relocated, the Caribou Inuit population never recovered with only a fraction of what once was being alive today. As a result, they have joined movements that call for the protection of their lands against outsiders.

== Photographic record of a starving mother ==
It was this time that in the former community of Padlei Richard Harrington took his iconic photo of a starving Inuk mother, pressing her nose and lips to those of her youngest child. On February 8, 1950 a few days before Harrington wrote in his journal:

Came upon the tiniest igloo yet. Outside lay a single, mangy dog, motionless, starving ... Inside, a small woman in clumsy clothes, large hood, with baby. She sat in darkness, without heat. She speaks to me. I believe she said they were starving. We left some tea, matches, kerosene, biscuits. And went on.

— Richard Harrington

== See also ==
- St. Lawrence Island famine

== Bibliography ==
=== References ===
- Bone, Robert M. (2013). The Regional Geography of Canada. Oxford University Press. ISBN 9780199002429. - Total pages: 510
- Rennie, Steve (2015). "Hunger in the Arctic". The Canadian Press. Archived from the original on November 8, 2020.
