= St. Lawrence Island famine =

1878–1880 famine on St. Lawrence Island

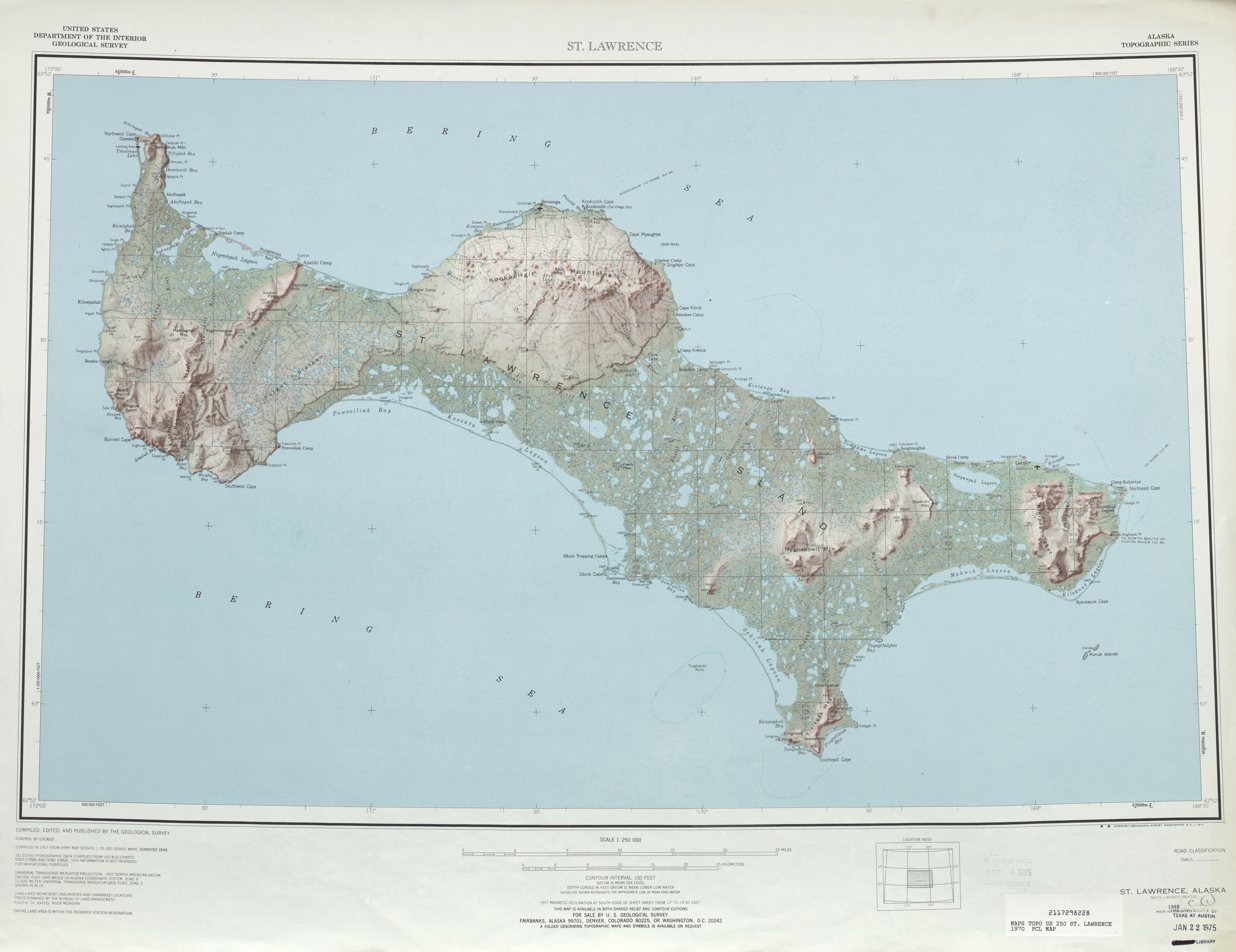
- Map sheet of Saint Lawrence Island, Alaska
- Country: United States
- Location: St. Lawrence Island, Alaska
- Period: 1878–1880
- Total deaths: ~1,000
- Consequences: Permanent change in the country's demographic, political and cultural landscape

The St. Lawrence Island famine killed around 1,000 people on St. Lawrence Island in the Bering Sea off the Alaskan mainland during the years 1878–1880. The possible causes may have been overfishing, disease, or the negative aspects of settler contact.

The island had a population of about 4,000 Central Alaskan Yupik and Siberian Yupik in the late 19th century, which subsisted by hunting walrus and whale, and by fishing in the Bering Sea. While many people left the island due to the famine, others attempted to stay and faced starvation. In 1880, a revenue cutter visited the island and found 1,000 dead victims of starvation. The survivors narrated tales of strange weather that prevented hunting and fishing in the ocean. The other contributing factors to the famine were the excessive depletion and overfishing of ocean life, and the then-recent introduction of communicable diseases to the islanders, such as dysentery, measles, black tongue (anemia), scarlet fever, and vitaminosis.

In an attempt to prevent further starvation on the island, a Presbyterian missionary introduced reindeer on the island in 1900. In 1903, the then-President of the United States Theodore Roosevelt established a reindeer reserve on the island.

== Background ==
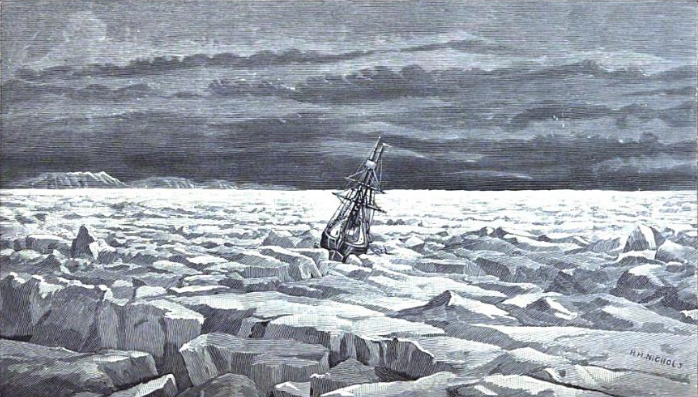
Sketch of the Thomas Corwin caught in ice floes in the Bering Sea, June 1880

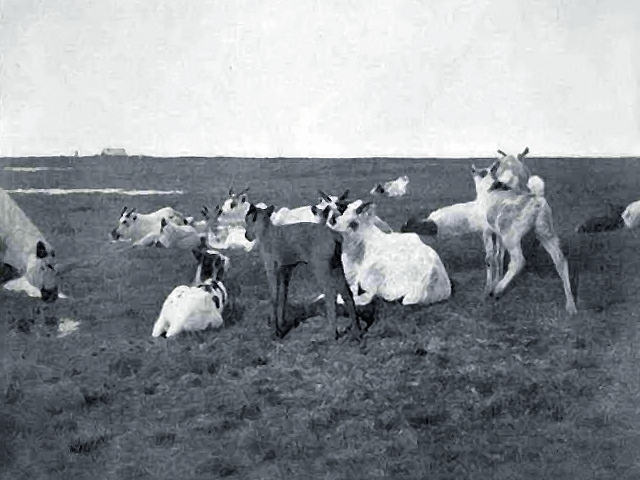
Reindeer calves in Alaska, 1899

In the late 19th century there were about 4,000 Central Alaskan Yupik and Siberian Yupik living in several villages on St. Lawrence Island. They subsisted by hunting walrus and whale and by fishing in the Bering Sea. A famine during the years 1878–1880 caused many to starve and many others to leave, drastically reducing the island's population. The revenue cutter USRC Thomas Corwin visited the island in 1880. After visiting multiple villages, the Thomas Corwin's crew estimated that out of 1,500 remaining inhabitants, 1,000 were found dead of starvation.

I landed at a place on the northern shore ... in which, wrapped in their fur blankets on the sleeping platforms lay about 25 dead bodies of adults ... Some miles to the eastward, along the coast was another village, where there were 200 dead people. In a large house were found about 15 bodies placed one upon another like cordwood.

Survivors told of strange weather that prevented hunting and fishing in the ocean. News reports of the time put the blame on traders supplying the people with liquor, causing them to "neglect laying up their usual supply of provisions". Nearly all the remaining residents were Siberian Yupik. Other contributing factors were the excessive depletion and overfishing of ocean life, and the introduction of communicable diseases such as dysentery, measles, black tongue (anemia), scarlet fever, and vitaminosis.

Many villages on the island were totally depopulated by the famine. One such village, Kukulik, was abandoned and was totally destroyed by the elements. All that remains of the once vibrant village is a midden mound 800 feet (240 m) long, 135 feet (41 m) wide and up to 23 feet (7.0 m) high, the largest known kitchen midden in the Arctic. Other populations of the area experienced similar food shortages.

== Aftermath ==
Reindeer were introduced on the island on July 23, 1900, by Presbyterian missionary Sheldon Jackson in an attempt to prevent starvation and improve the Native Alaskans' "plight". The reindeer herd grew to about 10,000 animals by 1917 but has since declined. Reindeer are herded as a source of subsistence meat to this day.

President Theodore Roosevelt established a reindeer reserve on the island in 1903. This caused legal issues in the indigenous land claim process to acquire surface and subsurface rights to their land under the section 19 of Alaska Native Claims Settlement Act (ANCSA), as they had to prove that the reindeer reserve was set up to support the indigenous people rather than to protect the reindeer themselves.

== See also ==
- 1950 Caribou Inuit famine

== Bibliography ==
Notes

References

- Bockstoce, John R. (2009). Furs and Frontiers In the Far North: The Contest Among Native and Foreign Nations for the Bering Strait Fur Trade. Yale University Press. ISBN 9780300154900. - Total pages: 495
- Case, David S.; Voluck, David A. (2012). Alaska Natives and American Laws: Third Edition. University of Alaska Press. ISBN 9781602231764. - Total pages: 520
- Collins, Henry B. Jr. (1951). Encyclopedia Arctica 12: Alaska, Geography and General. Vol. XII. Trustees of Dartmouth College. pp. 248–260.
- The Cornishman (11 November 1880). "A Starving Population". The Cornishman.
- Crawford, Michael Hewson (2001). The Origins of Native Americans: Evidence from Anthropological Genetics. Cambridge University Press. ISBN 9780521004107. - Total pages: 330
- Crowell, AL; Oozevaseuk, E. (2006). "The St. Lawrence Island famine and epidemic, 1878–80: a Yupik narrative in cultural and historical context". Arctic Anthropology. 43 (1): 1–19. doi:10.1353/arc.2011.0105. ISSN 1933-8139. PMID 21847843.
- Government of Alaska (2018). "History". Government of Alaska. Archived from the original on January 9, 2017.
- Theberge, Mary T.; Theberge, John B. (2011). The Ptarmigan's Dilemma: An Ecological Exploration Into the Mysteries of Life (2011 ed.). McClelland & Stewart. ISBN 9780771085185. - Total pages: 416
- The New Bloomfield (October 19, 1880). "Five Hundred Deaths From Starvation". The New Bloomfield. ISSN 2327-6894. OCLC 21170413.
