= Nanook of the North =

1922 film by Robert J. Flaherty

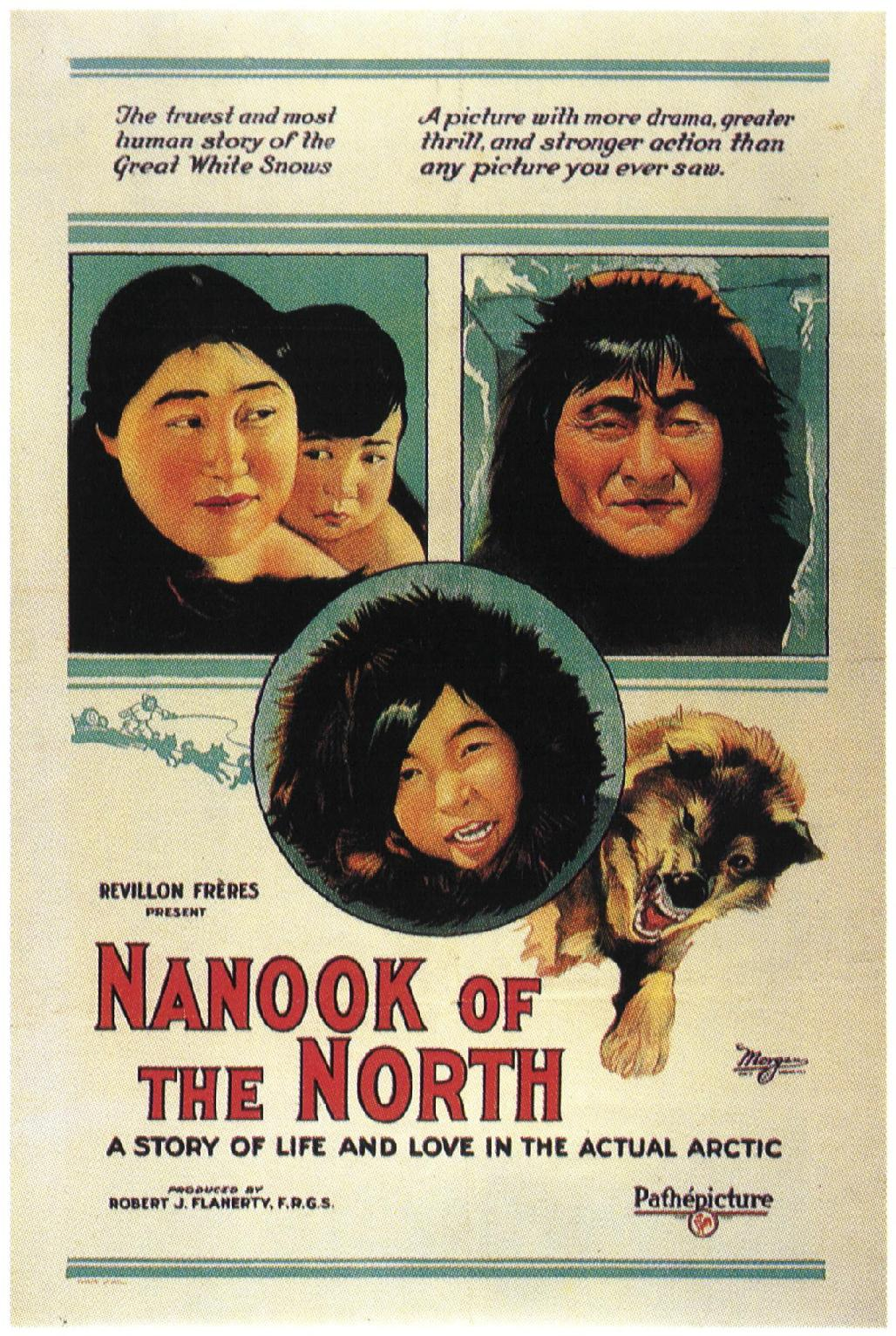
- Directed by: Robert J. Flaherty
- Written by: Robert J. Flaherty
- Produced by: Robert J. Flaherty
- Starring: Allakariallak; Nyla; Cunayou
- Cinematography: Robert J. Flaherty
- Edited by: Robert J. Flaherty; Charles Gelb
- Production company: Revillon Frères
- Distributed by: Pathé Exchange
- Release date: June 11, 1922
- Running time: 79 minutes
- Countries: United States; France
- Language: Silent film with English intertitles
- Budget: $53,000

Nanook of the North is a 1922 American silent film that combines elements of documentary and docudrama/docufiction, at a time when the concept of separating films into documentary and drama did not yet exist. In the tradition of what would later be called salvage ethnography, the film follows the struggles of the Inuk man named Nanook and his family in the Canadian Arctic. It is written and directed by Robert J. Flaherty, who also served as cinematographer, editor, and producer.

Some have criticized Flaherty for staging several sequences, but the film has been described by Roger Ebert as "stand[ing] alone" among Flaherty's films "in its stark regard for the courage and ingenuity of its heroes."

It was the first feature-length documentary to achieve commercial success, proving the financial viability of the genre and inspiring many films to come.

In 1989, Nanook of the North was among the first group of 25 films selected by the Library of Congress for preservation in the United States National Film Registry for being "culturally, historically, or aesthetically significant".

== Plot ==
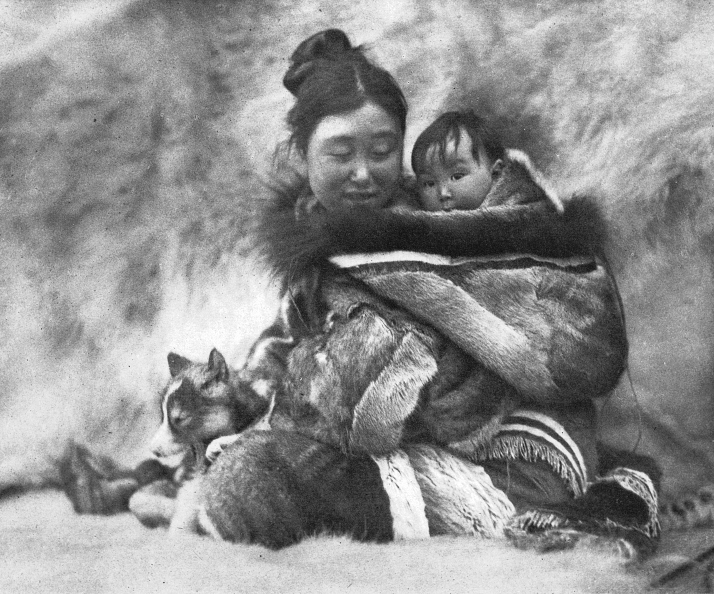
Nyla, wife of Nanook

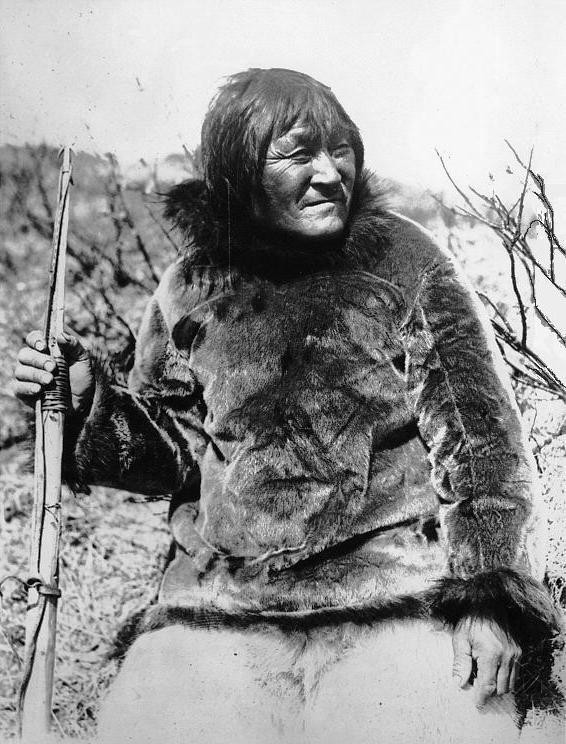
Nanook (Allakariallak), 1920

The film follows the lives of an Inuk, Nanook, and his family as they travel, search for food, and trade in the Ungava Peninsula of northern Quebec, Canada. Nanook, his wife Nyla and their family are introduced as fearless heroes who endure rigors no other race could survive. The audience sees Nanook, often with his family, hunt a walrus, build an igloo, go about his day, and perform other tasks.

== Production ==
=== Development ===
In 1910, Flaherty was hired by Sir William Mackenzie as an explorer and prospector searching for iron ore and other mineral deposits along the Hudson Bay for the Canadian Northern Railway. Learning about the lands and people there, Flaherty decided on his third expedition in 1913 to bring with him a glass-plate still camera and movie camera as well as a small portable printer and processor. Knowing nothing about film, he took a three-week course on the elementary techniques of filmmaking and film processing with the Eastman Kodak Company in Rochester, New York.

=== Filming ===
Using a Bell & Howell camera, a portable developing and printing machine, and some lighting equipment, Flaherty spent 1914 and 1915 shooting hours of film of Inuit life. By 1916, Flaherty had enough footage to begin evaluating screenings and was met with wide enthusiasm. However, in 1916, Flaherty dropped a cigarette onto the original camera negative (which was highly flammable nitrate stock) and lost 30,000 feet of film. With his first attempt ruined, Flaherty decided to return to film new footage and refocus the film on one Inuit family, as he felt his earlier footage was too much like a travelogue. Spending four years raising money, Flaherty was eventually funded by French fur company Revillon Frères. Flaherty then returned to the north, where he shot the film from August 1920 to August 1921. As a main character, Flaherty chose the celebrated hunter of the Itivimuit tribe, Allakariallak. The full collaboration of the Inuit was key to Flaherty's success, as the Inuit were his film crew and many of them knew his camera better than he did.

==== Building of the igloo ====
The building of the igloo is one of the most celebrated sequences in the film, but interior photography presented a problem. Building an igloo large enough for a camera to enter resulted in the dome collapsing, and when they finally succeeded in making the igloo it was too dark for photography. Instead, the images of the inside of the igloo in the film were actually shot in a special three-walled igloo for Flaherty's bulky camera so that there would be enough light for it to capture interior shots. This instead is what Flaherty said: "The average Eskimo igloo, about 12 feet in diameter, was much too small. On the dimensions I laid out for him, a diameter of 25 feet, Nanook and his companions started to build the biggest igloo of their lives. For two days they worked, the women and children helping them. Then came the hard part—to cut insets for the five large slab-ice windows without weakening the dome. They had hardly begun when the dome fell into pieces to the ground. 'Never mind,' said Nanook, 'I can do it next time.' For two days more they worked, but again with the same result; as soon as they began sitting in the ice windows their structure fell to the ground. It was a huge joke by this time and holding their sides they laughed their misfortune away. Again, Nanook began on the 'big Aggie igloo', but this time the women and children hauled barrels of water on sledges from the waterhole and iced the walls as they went up. Finally, the igloo was finished, and they stood eyeing it as satisfied as so many small children over a house of blocks. The light from the ice-windows proved inadequate, however, and when the interiors were finally filmed the dome's half just over the camera had to be cut away, so Nanook and his family went to sleep and awakened with all the cold of out-of-doors pouring in."

== Controversy ==
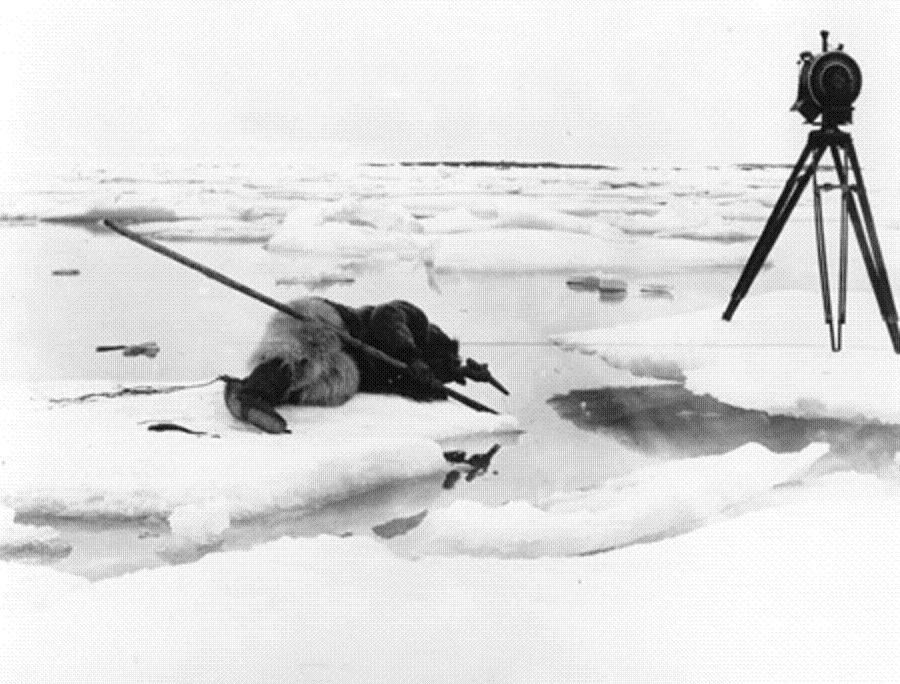
Filming of Nanook of the North in 1922

=== Hoax claims ===
"Nanook" was in fact named Allakariallak (pronounced [al.la.ka.ɢi.al.lak]); Flaherty chose "Nanook" ("polar bear" in Inuktitut mythology) because he felt its seeming genuineness made it more marketable. The "wife" shown in the film was not really his wife. According to Charlie Nayoumealuk, who was interviewed in Nanook Revisited (1990), "the two women in Nanook – Nyla (Alice [?] Nuvalinga) and Cunayou (whose real name we do not know) were not Allakariallak's wives, but were in fact common-law wives of Flaherty." Nyla's real name was later revealed as Maggie Nujarluktuk, and she would later give birth to Flaherty's son, Josephie. Although Allakariallak normally used a gun when hunting, Flaherty encouraged him to hunt after the fashion of his recent ancestors to capture the way the Inuit lived before European colonization of the Americas. Flaherty also exaggerated the peril to Inuit hunters with his claim, often repeated, that Allakariallak had died of starvation less than two years after the film was completed. In reality, Allakariallak died at home, likely of tuberculosis.

Furthermore, it has been criticized for portraying Inuit as without technology or culture, and situates them outside modern history. It was also criticized for comparing Inuit to animals. The film is considered by some to be an artifact of popular culture at the time and also a result of a historical fascination for Inuit performers in exhibitions, zoos, fairs, museums and early cinema.

Flaherty defended his work by stating, "one often has to distort a thing in order to catch its true spirit." Later filmmakers have pointed out that the only cameras available to Flaherty at the time were both large and immobile, making it impossible to effectively capture most interior shots or unstructured exterior scenes without significantly modifying the environment and subject action.

=== Visit to the trading post ===
In one scene, Nanook and his family arrive in a kayak at the trading post. Going to trade his hunt from the year, including the skins of foxes, seals, and polar bears, Nanook comes in contact with white people and there is an amusing interaction as the two cultures meet. The trader plays music on a gramophone and tries to explain how a man 'cans' his voice. Bending forward and staring at the machine, Nanook puts his ear closer as the trader cranks the mechanism again. The trader removes the record and hands it to Nanook who at first peers at it and then puts it in his mouth and bites it. The scene is meant to be a comical one as the audience laughs at the naivete of Nanook and people isolated from Western culture. In truth, the scene was entirely scripted and Allakariallak knew what a gramophone was.

=== Hunting of the walrus ===
It has been noted that in the 1920s, when Nanook was filmed, the Inuit had already begun integrating the use of Western clothing and were using rifles to hunt rather than harpoons, but this does not negate that the Inuit knew how to make traditional clothing from animals found in their environment, could still fashion traditional weapons and were perfectly able to make use of them if found to be preferable for a given situation.

The film is not technically sophisticated; how could it be, with one camera, no lights, freezing cold, and everyone equally at the mercy of nature? But it has an authenticity that prevails over any complaints that some of the sequences were staged. If you stage a walrus hunt, it still involves hunting a walrus, and the walrus hasn't seen the script. What shines through is the humanity and optimism of the Inuit.

— Roger Ebert

== Reception ==
As the first "nonfiction" work of its scale, Nanook of the North was ground-breaking cinema. It captured many authentic details of a culture little known to outsiders, and it was filmed in a remote location. Hailed almost unanimously by critics, the film was a box-office success in the United States and abroad. In the following years, many others would try to follow Flaherty's success with "primitive peoples" films. In The Nation in 1946, critic James Agee wrote: "Nanook has a beautiful simplicity, cheer, and hardiness which no subsequent documentary has improved on and which most have lost or perverted." In 2005, film critic Roger Ebert described the film's central figure, Nanook, as "one of the most vital and unforgettable human beings ever recorded on film." In a 2014 Sight and Sound poll, film critics voted Nanook of the North the seventh-best documentary film of all time.

On review aggregator website Rotten Tomatoes, the film holds an approval rating of 100% based on 35 reviews, with an average rating of 8.68/10. The site's critics' consensus reads: "An enthralling documentary and a visual feat, Nanook of the North fascinates with its dramatic depiction of life in an extremely hostile environment."

== Home media ==
In 1999, Nanook of the North was digitally remastered and released on DVD by The Criterion Collection. It includes an interview with Flaherty's widow (and Nanook of the North co-editor), Frances Flaherty, photos from Flaherty's trip to the arctic, and excerpts from a TV documentary, Flaherty and Film. In 2013, Flicker Alley released a remastered Blu-ray version that includes six other arctic films.

== Popular culture ==
The full film

=== Film ===
- The 1923 silent film comedy A Tough Winter parodied Nanook of the North. It was produced by Hal Roach and directed by Charley Chase, and starred Snub Pollard with Marie Mosquini and James Finlayson.
- Kabloonak is a 1994 film about the making of Nanook of the North. Charles Dance plays Flaherty and Adamie Quasiak Inukpuk (a relative of Nanook) plays Nanook.

=== Television ===
- In episode 2 of the 2015 series Documentary Now! (IFC), "Kunuk Uncovered" is a mockumentary parodying the 1990 documentary about the making of Nanook of the North titled Nanook Revisited, especially addressing the staging and manipulation of the original documentary.
- In Season 2 of the animated Nickelodeon action/adventure show The Legend of Korra, set in a 1920’s inspired fantasy world, the character Bolin is recruited to star in a series of silent propaganda films called “Nuktuk of the South”, heavily inspired by Nanook of the North.

=== Music ===
- "Nanook of the North" is the name of the protagonist in the Arctic-Themed Frank Zappa conjoined songs "Don't Eat the Yellow Snow" and "Nanook Rubs It."

== See also ==
- List of films with a 100% rating on Rotten Tomatoes, a film review aggregator website

== Bibliography ==
- Barnouw, Erik (1993). Documentary:A History of the Non-Fiction Film. Oxford: Oxford University Press.
- Emberley, Julia (January 1, 2007). Defamiliarizing the Aboriginal: Cultural Practices and Decolonization in Canada. University of Toronto Press. ISBN 978-0-8020-9151-2.
- Fatimah, Tobing Rony (1996). The Third Eye: Race, Cinema, and Ethnographic Spectacle. Durham and London: Duke University Press.
- Lowe, Kelly Fisher (2006). The Words and Music of Frank Zappa. Westport, Connecticut: Preager. ISBN 0275987795.
- McGrath, Melanie (2006). The Long Exile, A True Story of Deception and Survival Amongst the Inuit of the Canadian Arctic. Harper-Collins.
- Rothman, William (1997). Documentary Film Classics. Cambridge: Cambridge University Press. pp. 9–11.
