= Richard Harrington (photographer) =

Canadian photographer

- Born: February 24, 1911; Hamburg, Germany
- Died: October 11, 2005 (aged 94); Toronto, Ontario, Canada
- Known for: Photographer

Richard Harrington, OC (February 24, 1911 – October 11, 2005) was a Canadian photographer. He is best known for his photographs taken in the Canadian Arctic between 1948 and 1953, including his iconic shot of the 1950 Caribou Inuit famine and his 1949 photograph of Helen Konek.

Born in Hamburg, Germany, he immigrated to Canada in the mid-1920s as a teenager. Prior to working as a photographer, he worked as an X-Ray technician in Toronto. Harrington began taking photographs as a freelancer in the 1940's.

By 1950, Harrington was on assignment for LIFE magazine in the Canadian North, where he encountered the people of Padlei, Nunavut. His documentation of the effects of changing caribou migration patterns (known as the 1950 Caribou Inuit famine) became some of the most enduring photography of indigenous struggles at the time.

During his career he travelled to more than 100 countries, and his photographs have appeared in more than 24 books. His work has been shown at the National Archives of Canada, the Smithsonian Institution, and the Museum of Modern Art.

In 2001, he was made an Officer of the Order of Canada. The same year, his northern photographs were acquired by Library and Archives Canada for the "Project Naming" initiative, which involved relying upon indigenous elders to identify the subjects of many of Harrington's works.

== Selected bibliography ==
- The face of the Arctic: a cameraman’s story in words and pictures of five journeys into the far North (1952)
- British Columbia in pictures (1958)
- The Inuit: life as it was (1981, ISBN 0-88830-205-3)
- Richard Harrington: Canadian Photographer (1998, ISBN 1-890356-00-X)
- Photography in Canada, 1839 - 1989: An Illustrated History by Sarah Bassnett and Sarah Parsons from the Art Canada Institute.
