= Ennadai Lake =

Lake in Nunavut, Canada

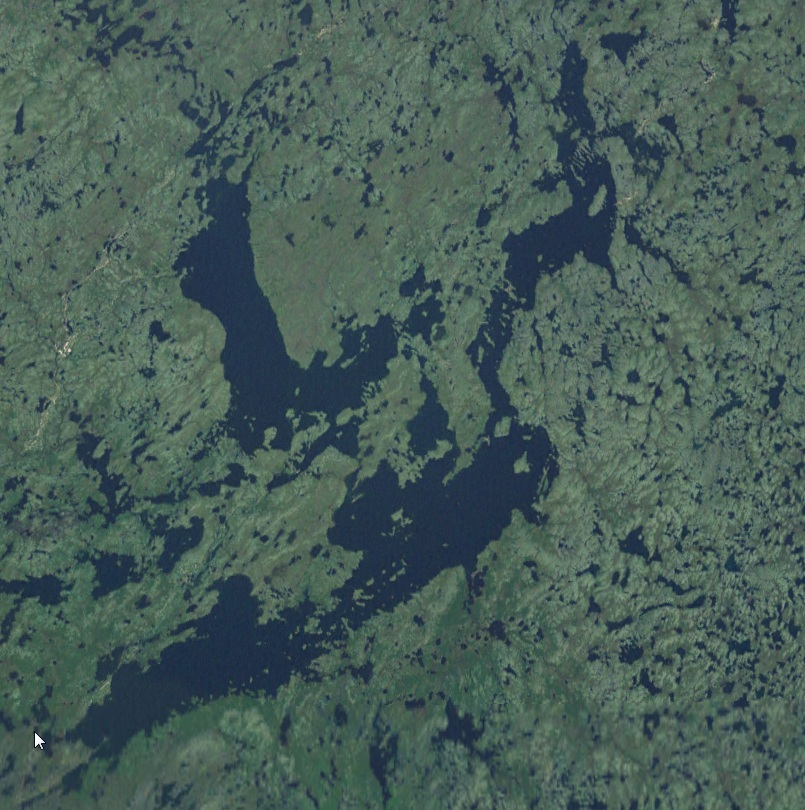
- Ennadai Lake

- Location in Nunavut
- Location: Kivalliq Region, Nunavut
- Coordinates: 60°58′N 101°20′W
- Primary outflows: Kazan River
- Basin countries: Canada
- Max. length: 84 km (52 mi)
- Max. width: 23 km (14 mi)
- Surface area: 681 km^{2} (263 sq mi)
- Surface elevation: 311 m (1,020 ft)
- Settlements: Ennadai (ghost town)

Ennadai Lake is a lake in the Kivalliq Region, Nunavut, Canada. It is 84 km (52 mi) long, and 4.8 to 22.5 km (3 to 14 mi) wide. It is drained to the north by the Kazan River. A 615 km (382 mi) section of the Kazan River from the outlet of Ennadai Lake to Baker Lake, was designated as a part of the Canadian Heritage Rivers System in 1990.

A weather station was located in the area at Ennadai.

== History ==
Until 1957, Ennadai Lake was home to the Ahiarmiut (Ihalmiut) Inuktitut syllabics ᐃᐦᐊᓪᒥᐅᑦ [ihalmiˈut], Caribou Inuit. Inland Inuit were also "known as the ("People from Beyond") or Ahiarmiut ("the Out-of-the-Way Dwellers"). The Ahialmiut "subsisted almost entirely on caribou year-round, unlike other Inuit groups that depended at least partially on harvest of animals from the sea."

The ancestors of present-day Inuit in the area along with ancestors of the Dene, who later left the area "used the Kazan River during summer for more than 5,000 years, retreating to the treeline or the coast for the rest of the year."

"The ancestors of the Ahialmiut had moved inland from coastal areas in what is now the Kivalliq Region of Nunavut. When the Dene joined the fur trade, and stopped following caribou onto the tundra each summer, the Ahialmiut moved farther inland, pushing south to the treeline by about 1850. They spent spring and summer inland, where they intercepted caribou travelling north in the spring, and camped in summer on the calving grounds."

These inland Inuit also lived along the banks of the Kazan River, Little Dubawnt Lake (renamed Kamilikuak) and north of Thlewiaza ("Big River")

The Ihalmiut were successful inland hunters. However, they experienced years of famine "when caribou wintered primarily in the southern forest, rather than on the tundra, or when they were unable to cache sufficient food supplies in the fall."

In the early 1890s the Caribou Inuit began trading with Canadians of European descent. They maintained trap lines for white fox along their caribou hunting trails. They continued to depend on the Qamanirjuaq caribou. "But after years of hardship in the late 1940s and 1950s, many people started moving into communities. Government encouraged them to do so to allow their children to attend school, and to have access to medical care at nursing stations."

Ihalmiut were Caribou Inuit, inland-dwelling people in the Barren Lands region whose subsistence centred on hunting caribou. Caribou meat was dried for the winter months.

On March 17, 2000, two pilots perished in an aviation accident while landing a Douglas DC-3 at Ennadai Lake. The plane departed Points North Landing, Saskatchewan with 3,000 kg (6,600 lb) of cargo on board for building materials for the construction of a lodge.

== Relocations ==
The Ihalmiut were relocated by the Government of Canada in May 1957 to Henik Lake. The caribou were scarce in the Henik Lake area and starvation soon set in. They were later relocated again to Whale Cove.

- 1949, Ihalmiut were relocated from Ennadai Lake to Nueltin Lake, but the relocation did not last as hunting was poor, precipitating the band's return to Ennadai Lake. The Royal Canadian Army Service Corps built the radio station at Ennadai Lake in 1949.
- May 1957, Ihalmiut were airlifted from Ennadai Lake to Henik Lake, 72 km (45 mi) from the trading post at Padlei, a distance considered reasonable by the Government of Canada. Many Ihalmiut starved.
- Later in 1957, Ihalmiut were moved to Whale Cove where some began carving figurines for income.
- In 1958, 29 Ihalmiut went to Padlei because of its trading post, 39 were at Yathkyed Lake, and the majority were brought to Eskimo Point (Arviat) by the Royal Canadian Mounted Police.
- In 1959, the Padlei trading post closed, and the remaining Ihalmiut was relocated. Farley Mowat's 1959 revisit to the Ihalmiut inspired the follow-up book "Walking on the Land", a depiction of the effects of the federal government, the Royal Canadian Mounted Police, Catholic missionaries, and big business upon the people.

The relocations to Nueltin Lake and Henik Lake were complete failures. "The Ahiarmiut themselves maintain that Ennadai Lake was an excellent hunting area and failed to understand why they were relocated."

On September 7, 1985, 36 elders returned to Ennadai Lake from where they had been relocated in the 1950s.

In an article in Inuktitut, David Serkoak, who was a child at the time of the relocation, attempted to understand the reasoning behind decision to move the Ahiarmiut.

[S]tarvation was approaching us, although some of the people at Ennadai lake were living quite well. Hard times came once in a while, but nothing very drastic. I don't believe that many people had much advance warning that they would have to move. Some of them found out the same day they were to be moved. When we returned to Ennadai recently, we stopped at a traditional camping spot where, the elders told us, a vehicle came to pick us up one day-we were told we had to move. The people had to pack so quickly that many articles were left behind. We were moved to the Henik lake area. That was when the real trouble hit us. I guess it was new for some of the people. The hardest time for them was between Ennadai lake and the coast. I think the idea behind the move had something to do with a change in caribou migration patterns, which meant that the caribou were farther away from the Ennadai lake area. I think the government wanted the Ihalmiut to move to the coast so that we might become fishermen and make ourselves useful.

— Serkoak, 1985

A workshop was held in Arviat in 2003 with Ahiarmiut elders on 'Survival and Angakkuuniq' in which "Ahiarmiut elders Job and Eva Muqyunnik, Luke and Mary Anautalik often reflected on the events that almost fifty years ago had disrupted their lives and still affected them." This was followed by a second workshop in 2006 held at Ennadai Lake with Ahiarmiut originally from Ennadai Lake, including Eva Muqyunnik, Job Muqyunnik, Mary Anautalik, John Aulatjut, Silas Ilungiyajuk, Geena Aulatjut then living in Arviat, Andrew Alikashuak living in Whale Cove, and Mary Whitmore from Churchill, Manitoba. Annie Seewoe and Luke Anautalik from Arviat and David Serkoak from Iqaluit were unable to attend.

=== Government apology and settlement ===
In 2013 the Ennadai Lake Society filed their final submission in their special claim against the federal government. One of their requests was an official apology from the federal government "for the unbelievable hardship the Ahiarmiut suffered" during the repeated relocations from Ennadai Lake. In 2018 the federal government reached an agreement with the survivors of the forced relocation for a $5 million settlement. In January 2019, the federal government announced that Carolyn Bennett, at the time Minister of Crown–Indigenous Relations, would deliver the formal apology on behalf of the Canadian government in Arviat, Nunavut on January 22.

== Geography and climate ==
Ennadai Lake is within the Hearne Domain. This lake is of the few weather stations in Nunavut to report a subarctic climate (Köppen Dfc) as opposed to a tundra climate (Köppen ET).

Climate data for Ennadai Lake (Ennadai) Location ID: N/A; coordinates 61°08′N 100°54′W; elevation: 325 m (1,066 ft); (1951−1980 normals, extremes 1949-1979)
Month	Jan	Feb	Mar	Apr	May	Jun	Jul	Aug	Sep	Oct	Nov	Dec	Year
Record high °C (°F)	−2.8 (27.0)	0.6 (33.1)	3.3 (37.9)	10.6 (51.1)	25.0 (77.0)	28.9 (84.0)	31.7 (89.1)	28.3 (82.9)	26.7 (80.1)	16.7 (62.1)	4.4 (39.9)	1.1 (34.0)	31.7 (89.1)
Mean daily maximum °C (°F)	−27.0 (−16.6)	−24.8 (−12.6)	−18.8 (−1.8)	−7.7 (18.1)	1.7 (35.1)	12.2 (54.0)	17.7 (63.9)	15.7 (60.3)	7.1 (44.8)	−1.9 (28.6)	−13.4 (7.9)	−21.9 (−7.4)	−5.1 (22.8)
Daily mean °C (°F)	−30.9 (−23.6)	−29.1 (−20.4)	−23.8 (−10.8)	−13.1 (8.4)	−2.7 (27.1)	7.2 (45.0)	13.0 (55.4)	11.5 (52.7)	3.9 (39.0)	−5.0 (23.0)	−17.3 (0.9)	−25.8 (−14.4)	−9.3 (15.3)
Mean daily minimum °C (°F)	−34.8 (−30.6)	−33.4 (−28.1)	−28.7 (−19.7)	−18.4 (−1.1)	−7.1 (19.2)	2.1 (35.8)	8.2 (46.8)	7.2 (45.0)	0.7 (33.3)	−8.1 (17.4)	−21.2 (−6.2)	−29.6 (−21.3)	−13.6 (7.5)
Record low °C (°F)	−49.4 (−56.9)	−50.3 (−58.5)	−45.6 (−50.1)	−38.3 (−36.9)	−29.3 (−20.7)	−8.3 (17.1)	−1.1 (30.0)	−1.7 (28.9)	−11.1 (12.0)	−34.7 (−30.5)	−42.5 (−44.5)	−45.0 (−49.0)	−50.3 (−58.5)
Average precipitation mm (inches)	10.3 (0.41)	6.4 (0.25)	11.7 (0.46)	15.3 (0.60)	19.6 (0.77)	30.7 (1.21)	51.9 (2.04)	41.7 (1.64)	44.7 (1.76)	33.2 (1.31)	16.4 (0.65)	12.6 (0.50)	294.5 (11.59)
Average rainfall mm (inches)	0.0 (0.0)	trace	0.0 (0.0)	0.5 (0.02)	10.4 (0.41)	27.5 (1.08)	51.9 (2.04)	41.6 (1.64)	34.3 (1.35)	7.4 (0.29)	0.1 (0.00)	trace	173.7 (6.84)
Average snowfall cm (inches)	9.6 (3.8)	6.3 (2.5)	11.9 (4.7)	14.4 (5.7)	8.5 (3.3)	3.1 (1.2)	trace	trace	9.1 (3.6)	25.2 (9.9)	16.3 (6.4)	12.7 (5.0)	117.1 (46.1)
Average precipitation days (≥ 0.2 mm)	9	7	9	9	9	9	12	12	13	15	13	10	127
Average rainy days (≥ 0.2 mm)	0	0	0	trace	4	8	12	12	10	3	trace	0	49
Average snowy days (≥ 0.2 cm)	9	7	9	9	6	2	0	trace	4	13	13	10	82
Average relative humidity (%)	74	73	75	80	79	65	62	67	79	86	81	75	75
Average dew point °C (°F)	−31.5 (−24.7)	−29.8 (−21.6)	−25.7 (−14.3)	−13.6 (7.5)	−4.0 (24.8)	3.0 (37.4)	7.7 (45.9)	6.9 (44.4)	1.1 (34.0)	−6.6 (20.1)	−20.0 (−4.0)	−28.7 (−19.7)	−11.8 (10.8)
Source: Environment and Climate Change Canada (temperature) (precipitation) (humidity and dew point)

== Flora ==
At Ennadai Lake's Kazan River outflow, the forest includes sparse black spruce and tamarack that grow approximately 1–2 m (3 ft 3 in – 6 ft 7 in) high, stunted because of harsh winds and cool summers.

== Fauna ==
Ennadai Lake is part of the "annual migration route of the almost 500,000 strong Qamanirjuaq barren-ground caribou herd, and the occasional route of the 275,000 member Beverly herd." Beverly Lake is the area where the Beverly herd regularly bears its young. The Qamanirjuaq herd regularly bears its young near Qamanirjuaq Lake. Both herds historically migrate into Saskatchewan, Manitoba and the Northwest Territories. According to Arviat elders, for the first time since the late 1960s Qamanirjuaq caribou began their spring migration where the Seal River flows into the Hudson Bay."] Since the 1960s, Qamanirjuaq caribou have been moving out of their winter range in northwestern Manitoba, northeastern Saskatchewan, southeastern NWT, and southwestern Nunavut into staging areas (Note: "'Staging is' the gathering of large groups of caribou.") near Cullaton Lake, Seal Hole Lake and Ennadai Lake." In late March / early April when tens of thousands of caribou occupy these areas just before their spring migration "east as far as the Hudson Bay coast, then north to their calving grounds." In April large groups of yearlings and cows begin their traditional migration corridors back to the calving areas and in May the bulls leave their winter range and begin their migration.

== Notable people from Ennadai Lake ==
Luke Anowtalik (1932–2006), an Ihalmiut, was a first-generation Inuk artist with work in major galleries including the National Gallery of Canada, the Marion Scott Gallery and Spirit Wrestler Gallery in Vancouver, Inuit Galerie in Mannheim. He was born in the Ennadai Lake area where he began carving his small swivel figures in caribou antler and sold his first carvings to Ministry of Transport employees working there. The federal government relocated him first to Whale Cove, then to Arviat where he continued carving often using the hard stone that was available there. His wife Mary Ayaq Anowtalik is also a well-known carver.

Elisapee Karetak, an Ihalmiut, was an infant when her father Hallauk, her mother Kikkik and Elisapee's three young siblings were relocated from Ennadai Lake to Henik Lake in 1957. In 2000 Karetak with Montreal-based filmmaker Ole Gjerstad, produced a one-hour documentary entitled Kikkik about her mother. After her husband was murdered by a man delusional from hunger, Kikkik stabbed the man and began a long journey from Henik Lake to get help. Kikkik trekked for days across the Barrens carrying one-and-a-half-year-old Elisapee in her amauti and with three other children in tow.

They hadn’t eaten for days and Kikkik struggled to carry all the children. She knew they wouldn’t all survive, so she dug a hole in the snow and left two girls behind. An RCMP plane spotted them, brought them to safety and found the abandoned girls. Only one had survived. Kikkik then found herself charged with the murder of Ootek and causing the death of one of her daughters. The film recreates the murder, the trek and the trial in 1958 — in which Kikkik was found not guilty. It’s a story Kikkik took to her grave. Her three surviving children didn’t learn of it until they read the tale in Farley Mowat’s 1959 book The Desperate People. "I guess the elders and my mother wanted to protect me from that," Karetak says. The new film focuses on Kikkik’s hardships, but takes a deeper look at the devastation government officials inflicted on Inuit in the 1950s. "It happened all over Nunavut and Nunavik. And for some reason people are not talking about it. I think this will open the door," Karetak says.

— Nunatsiaq 2002

== Ennadai Lake in popular culture ==
Farley Mowat wrote a series of books about the Inuit from the Ennadai Lake region including People of the Deer in 1952, The Desperate People in 1959, Death of a People, Walking on the Land in 2001, and No Man's River in 2004.

== See also ==
- List of lakes of Nunavut
- List of lakes of Canada
