= Inuktitut (magazine) =

Inuit multilingual magazine

Inuktitut (ᐃᓄᒃᑎᑐᑦ) is a Canadian Inuit magazine produced by the Inuit Tapiriit Kanatami and Beat Studios. The magazine, now available quarterly (twice per year), is published in Inuktitut (syllabics), Inuinnaqtun, English, and French.

The stated goal of the magazine is to present "...the heritage of Inuit culture, language and society in a modern format". The magazine publishes first person stories, essays, fiction, features, editorials, traditional legends, and oral Inuit history. They also reproduce material and pictures found in archives and personal collections worldwide.

Inuktitut was first published in 1959 and is funded by Indian and Northern Affairs Canada. Originally published three times a year in black and white, the magazine was relaunched in 2005 as a quarterly in full colour and accepts advertising. The claimed circulation is 13,000 as of 2008, and it is available by mail throughout Nunavut, Nunavik, Nunatsiavut, and the Inuvialuit region of the Northwest Territories. Although the magazine is available free in the above areas, it is also possible to obtain an annual subscription for C$25.
