= Kasmere Lake =

Lake in Manitoba, Canada

- Location of the lake in Manitoba Kasmere Lake (Canada)
- Location: Division No. 23, North-West Manitoba
- Coordinates: 59°35′N 101°10′W
- Primary inflows: Thlewiaza River
- Primary outflows: Thlewiaza River
- Basin countries: Canada
- Settlements: None

Kasmere Lake is a lake in the northwest corner of Manitoba, near the provincial boundaries with Nunavut and Saskatchewan, Canada. It is drained by the Thlewiaza River.

== See also ==
- List of lakes of Manitoba
