= Ilya Tolstoy (colonel) =

US Army colonel

Ilya Andreyevich Tolstoy
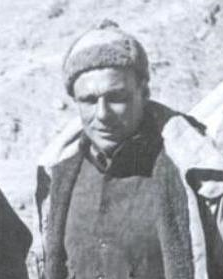
- Born: February 3, 1903; Tula Governorate, Russian Empire
- Died: October 28, 1970; New York City, United States
- Military career
- Rank: Colonel

Count Ilya Andreyevich Tolstoy (3 February 1903 in Tula Governorate – 28 October 1970 in New York City) was a U.S. Army Colonel and President Franklin D. Roosevelt's envoy in Tibet. He was one of the founders of Marineland of Florida, of the Bahamas National Trust, and he served on the Caribbean Conservation Commission. He was a grandson of Leo Tolstoy.

== Life ==
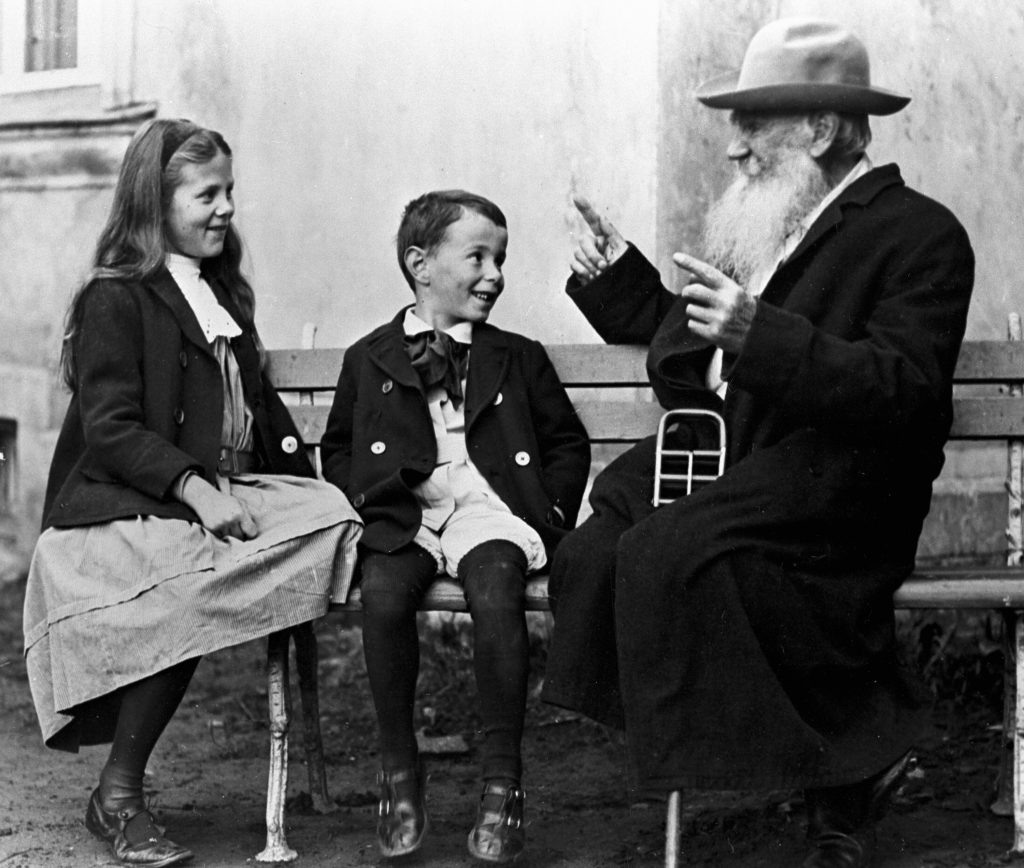
Leo Tolstoy with his grandchildren (Sofia and Ilya), 1909-1910

Count Ilya Tolstoy was born in 1903 at Toptivovo, Tula, Russia. His father was Count Andrey Lvovich Tolstoy, son of writer Leo Tolstoy, and his mother was Olga Diterichs, daughter of General of the Infantry Konstantin Diterichs (and sister of General Mikhail Diterikhs). Tolstoy attended the Moscow School of Agriculture, before joining the Imperial Cavalry and serving in Tashkent. In 1917 – 1918 he worked for the Russian Department of Agriculture in Turkestan.

Tolstoy emigrated to the United States in 1924. He studied at the William Penn College and Iowa State University, Ames.

In 1927, Tolstoy became associated with the explorer and naturalist, William Douglas Burden, an associate and trustee of the American Museum of Natural History. He was inducted into the Explorers Club in New York in 1931. Tolstoy was one of the pioneers of underwater photography and one of the founders and owners of the world's first oceanarium, Marineland of Florida with William Douglas Burden, Cornelius Vanderbilt Whitney and Sherman Pratt.

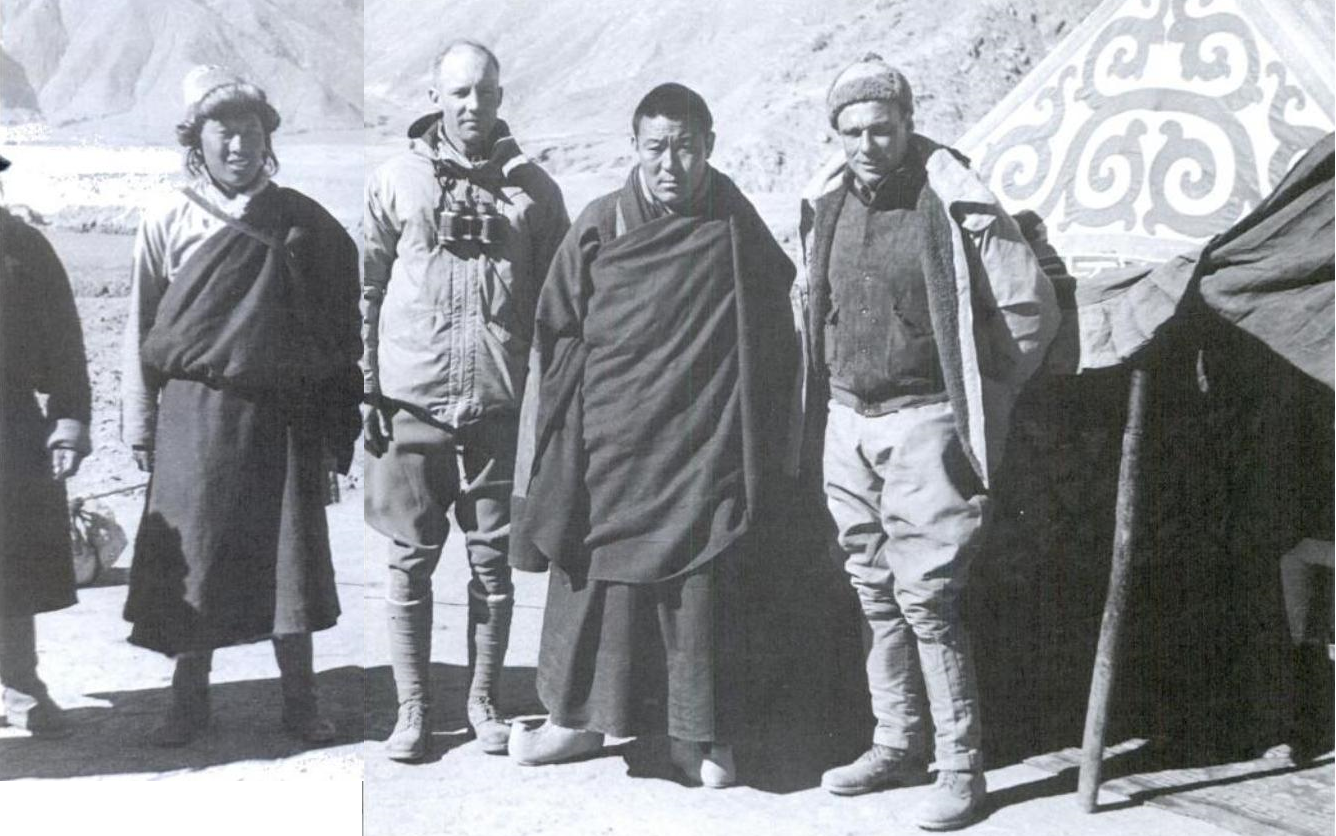
Brooke Dolan (second from left) and Ilya Tolstoy (right) with their monk-interpreter, Kusho Yonton Singhe in 1942 near Lhasa, Tibet

In World War II Tolstoy was an officer in the Office of Strategic Services. He and Brooke Dolan went to Tibet as envoys of the American President Franklin D. Roosevelt in 1942 and met the Dalai Lama, then barely seven years old. Dolan and Tolstoy's expedition entered Tibet by the Nathu La. In 1945 he headed a top-secret mission into the interior of China of search of uranium.

His first marriage in 1920 was to Zoya Dmitrievna Platonova (born on 18 December 1891, died on 27 September 1978). His son Count Alexander Tolstoy was born in 1921. His second marriage was to Vera Ilinichna Sidorkova (born on 28 September 1894, died on 10 August 1974), by whom he had a daughter, Sofija, born in 1922. The marriage ended in divorce.

Tolstoy died on 28 October 1970 in New York and was buried in the cemetery of the Novo-Diveevo Cemetery, Nanuet, New York, USA.
