= Nueltin Lake =

Lake in Manitoba and Nunavut, Canada

- Location in Nunavut Nueltin Lake (Canada)
- Location: Division No. 23, Manitoba / Kivalliq, Nunavut
- Coordinates: 60°09′03″N 099°45′23″W
- Primary inflows: Thlewiaza River
- Primary outflows: Thlewiaza River
- Catchment area: 27,056 km^{2} (10,446 sq mi)
- Basin countries: Canada
- Max. length: 144 km (89 mi)
- Surface area: 2,279 km^{2} (880 sq mi)
- Average depth: 100 m (330 ft)
- Water volume: 228 km^{3} (55 cu mi)
- Shore length^{1}: 3,922 km (2,437 mi)
- Surface elevation: 278 m (912 ft)
- Islands: many small islands
- ^{1} Shore length is not a well-defined measure.

Nueltin Lake (Chipewyan: Nu-thel-tin-tu-ch-eh, meaning "sleeping island lake") straddles the Manitoba—Nunavut border in Canada. The lake, which has an area of 2,279 km^{2} (880 sq mi), is predominantly in Nunavut's Kivalliq Region, and on the Manitoba side there is the Nueltin Lake Airport which serves the fishing lodge. The lake is split into two parts by a set of narrows. It is drained by the Thlewiaza River.

== History ==
Ilya Andreyevich Tolstoy, the grandson of count Leo Tolstoy, stayed at the Revillon Frères Post of Windy Lake by Nueltin Lake in the winter of 1928–1929. He was in a group attempting to get film footage of the migrating caribou for the William Douglas Burden and William C. Chanler's production, The Silent Enemy, one of the last and greatest of the silent films, released in 1930.

The American naturalist, Francis Harper (biologist) with funding from the United States National Science Foundation, undertook a study of the barren-ground caribou in 1947 in the Nueltin Lake area with research assistants, including Farley Mowat, resulting in the publication of Harper's book entitled Caribou of Keewatin. Inuk artist Luke Anowtalik, who was fifteen at the time, was featured in this publication.

In 1949, the Government of Canada forcibly relocated an Inuit group, the Ihalmiut, to Nueltin from Ennadai Lake but the hunting was poor and they did not stay in the Nueltin area.

== See also ==
- List of lakes of Nunavut
- List of lakes of Manitoba
- P. G. Downes
