= Robert Martin Bone =

Canadian geographer and textbook author

- Born: June 20, 1933 (age 92)
- Education: University of British Columbia; University of Washington; University of Nebraska
- Occupation: Scholar at University of Saskatchewan

Robert Martin Bone is a Canadian geography scholar.

Robert Martin Bone completed a degree in Geography from the University of British Columbia and a masters degree from the University of Washington in 1957 and the University of Nebraska in 1962. He worked with the Canadian government for a number of years before starting employment as a professor at the Institute of Northern Studies (INS).

With around 20 publications, Bone is also the author of The Regional Geography of Canada, a textbook used in Canadian universities.

== Bibliography ==
Notes

References

- Bone, Robert M.- Professor Department of Geography (2013). The Regional Geography of Canada. Oxford University Press. ISBN 9780199002429. - Total pages: 510
- researchgate.net (2016). "Robert M Bone University of Saskatchewan, Saskatoon".
- University of Saskatchewan (2016). "R.M. Bone fonds - MG 240". University of Saskatchewan.
