= Thlewiaza River =

Thlewiaza
- Etymology: Chipewyan: Łuaze, "small fish" + des, "river"
- Native name: Łuazedes (Chipewyan)

Location
- Country: Canada
- Province/Territory: Manitoba, Nunavut

Physical characteristics
- Source: Snyder Lake
  - location: northwestern Manitoba
  - coordinates: 59°24′12″N 101°34′14″W
- Mouth: Hudson Bay
  - location: south of Arviat, Nunavut
  - coordinates: 60°28′59″N 94°40′0″W
- Basin size: 64,399.6 km^{2} (24,864.8 sq mi)
- Discharge
  - average: 507 cubic metres per second (17,900 cu ft/s)

Basin features
- Tributaries
  - left: Windy River
- Waterbodies: Kasmere Lake, Nueltin Lake, Edehon Lake, Ranger Seal Lake

The Thlewiaza River is a river in Canada. Although some sources define the river as originating out of Nueltin Lake, according to the Canadian Geographical Names Database the river begins at Snyder Lake in northwestern Manitoba. From there the river flows northeast through Kasmere Lake into the southwest end of Nueltin Lake. It exits Nueltin Lake at its northern end in Nunavut and flows 275 kilometres (171 mi) east through Edehon Lake and Ranger Seal Lake before emptying into Hudson Bay. Its drainage basin covers an area of 64,399.6 square kilometres (24,864.8 sq mi).

The river's name in Chipewyan is Łuazedes (pronounced thlu-assee-des), meaning "little fish river", in reference to the plentiful grayling in its waters. It is known to the Inuit as the "big river" and used by them to travel inland where they trap arctic foxes and hunt caribou. A sighting of harbour seals at Edehon Lake has been documented and sightings further upstream at Nueltin Lake have also been reported.

The Thlewiaza was first mapped in 1912 by Ernest Oberholtzer and Billy Magee, an Ojibwe trapper. There are no permanent settlements in the area.
