= Henik Lake =

Group of lakes in Nunavut, Canada

North Henik Lake
- Location within Nunavut
- Location: Kivalliq Region, Nunavut
- Coordinates: 61°42′N 97°40′W
- Basin countries: Canada
- Surface area: 245 km^{2} (95 sq mi)
- Settlements: uninhabited

South Henik Lake
- Location in Nunavut
- Location: Kivalliq Region, Nunavut
- Coordinates: 61°33′N 97°24′W
- Basin countries: Canada
- Surface area: 513 km^{2} (198 sq mi)
- Surface elevation: 184 m (604 ft)
- Settlements: uninhabited

Henik Lake is located in the Kivalliq Region of Nunavut, Canada. The lake is made up of two lakes, North Henik Lake and South Henik Lake with a narrows separating them. Of the two, North Henik Lake is the smaller with an area of 245 km^{2} (95 sq mi), while South Henik Lake has an area of 513 km^{2} (198 sq mi).

== History ==
In 1949, a group of Inuit, the Ihalmiut, were relocated from Ennadai Lake to Nueltin Lake but they later returned to Ennadai. In 1957, the Government of Canada relocated the Ihalmuit a second time but to Henik Lake, an area with few caribou and the group of 59 were soon starving. Among them were, Kikkik, who killed her half-brother in self-defence.

== See also ==
- List of lakes of Nunavut
- List of lakes of Canada
