= Padlei =

Abandoned settlement in Nunavut, Canada

- Ghost town
- Coordinates: 61°55′N 096°40′W
- Country: Canada
- Territory: Nunavut
- Region: Kivalliq

Padlei is a former community in the Kivalliq Region of Nunavut, Canada. It is located on the mainland on the north shore of Kinga (Kingarvalik) Lake at the juncture of the Maguse River. Whale Cove is to the east, while the Henik Lakes are to the southwest.

== History ==
The community was where, during the 1950 Caribou Inuit famine, photographer Richard Harrington took his iconic photo of a starving Caribou Inuk mother, pressing her nose and lips to those of her youngest child. On February 8, 1950 a few days before Harrington wrote in his journal:

Came upon the tiniest igloo yet. Outside lay a single, mangy dog, motionless, starving ... Inside, a small woman in clumsy clothes, large hood, with baby. She sat in darkness, without heat. She speaks to me. I believe she said they were starving. We left some tea, matches, kerosene, biscuits. And went on.

— Richard Harrington

Containing three buildings, Padlei was the site of a trading post operated by the Hudson's Bay Company from 1926 to 1960. The subgroup of Caribou Inuit who frequented the post were the Padleimiut (or Padlirmiut, or Paallirmiut, or Patlirmiut).

== See also ==
- List of communities in Nunavut
