= List of female viceroys in Canada =

This is a list of women who have served as viceroys in Canada. Canada is a constitutional monarchy with King Charles III as the reigning Canadian monarch. As the King does not reside in Canada, his daily responsibilities in the country are undertaken by the Governor General of Canada in the federal jurisdiction and by a lieutenant governor in each of the ten provincial jurisdictions. Collectively, these individuals are the King's official viceregal representatives.

This list also includes women who have served as commissioners, an office in each of Canada's three federal territories with similar function to provincial viceroys.

== Governors general ==
A total of five women have served, and one currently serving, as the Governor General of Canada.

Image	Name	Home province	Start of mandate	End of mandate	Notes
	Jeanne Sauvé	Saskatchewan	14 May 1984	28 January 1990	First female governor general in Canadian history; appointed by Queen Elizabeth II on the advice of Prime Minister Pierre Trudeau; member of the Fransaskois community.
	Adrienne Clarkson	Ontario	7 October 1999	27 September 2005	First visible minority and first Chinese Canadian to be appointed governor general by Queen Elizabeth II on the advice of Prime Minister Jean Chrétien; first governor general without a military or political background.
	Michaëlle Jean	Quebec	27 September 2005	1 October 2010	First Black Canadian woman to serve as a vicereine in Canada. Appointed by Queen Elizabeth II on advice of Prime Minister Paul Martin.
	Julie Payette	Quebec	2 October 2017	21 January 2021	First former astronaut to serve as a vicereine in Canada. Appointed by Queen Elizabeth II on advice of Prime Minister Justin Trudeau.
	Mary Simon	Quebec	26 July 2021	8 June 2026	First Inuk to serve as a vicereine in Canada. Appointed by Queen Elizabeth II on advice of Prime Minister Justin Trudeau.
	Louise Arbour	Quebec	8 June 2026	incumbent	First Governor General of Canada appointed by King Charles III on the advice of Prime Minister Mark Carney; former puisne justice of the Supreme Court of Canada and former UN High Commissioner for Human Rights.

== Lieutenant governors ==
A total of 33 women have served, or are currently serving, as the lieutenant governor of a province. As of February 2025, there are 8 serving provincial female viceroys in Canada.

Image	Name	Province	Start of mandate	End of mandate	Notes
	Pauline McGibbon	Ontario	10 April 1974	15 September 1980	First vicereine in Canadian history; appointed Lieutenant Governor of Ontario by Governor General Jules Léger upon the advice of Prime Minister Pierre Trudeau.
	Pearl McGonigal	Manitoba	23 October 1981	11 December 1986	First female lieutenant governor in Manitoba.
	Wilma Helen Hunley	Alberta	22 January 1985	11 March 1991	First female lieutenant governor in Alberta.
	Sylvia Fedoruk	Saskatchewan	7 September 1988	31 May 1994	First female lieutenant governor in Saskatchewan.
	Marion Reid	Prince Edward Island	16 August 1990	30 August 1995	First female lieutenant governor in Prince Edward Island.
	Margaret McCain	New Brunswick	21 June 1994	18 April 1997	First female lieutenant governor in New Brunswick.
	Lise Thibault	Quebec	30 January 1997	7 June 2007	First female lieutenant governor in Quebec; first person with a physical disability to serve as a viceroy in Canada.
	Marilyn Trenholme Counsell	New Brunswick	18 April 1997	26 August 2003	Succeeded Margaret McCain as Lieutenant Governor of New Brunswick; first woman to succeed another female vicereine in Canada.
	Hilary Weston	Ontario	24 January 1997	7 March 2002	
	Lois Hole	Alberta	11 February 2000	6 January 2005	Died while in office at the age of 75.
	Lynda Haverstock	Saskatchewan	21 February 2000	1 August 2006	
	Myra Freeman	Nova Scotia	17 May 2000	7 September 2006	First female lieutenant governor in Nova Scotia.
	Iona Campagnolo	British Columbia	25 September 2001	30 September 2007	First female lieutenant governor in British Columbia.
	Barbara Oliver Hagerman	Prince Edward Island	31 July 2006	15 August 2011	
	Mayann Francis	Nova Scotia	7 September 2006	12 April 2012	Second Black Canadian to serve as a vicereine in Canada, after Governor General Michaëlle Jean.
	Judith Guichon	British Columbia	2 November 2012	24 April 2018	
	Vaughn Solomon Schofield	Saskatchewan	22 March 2012	21 March 2018	
	Jocelyne Roy-Vienneau	New Brunswick	23 October 2014	2 August 2019	Died while in office at the age of 63
	Lois Mitchell	Alberta	12 June 2015	26 August 2020	
	Elizabeth Dowdeswell	Ontario	23 September 2014	14 November 2023	
	Janice Filmon	Manitoba	19 June 2015	24 October 2022	Wife of former Premier Gary Filmon.
	Antoinette Perry	Prince Edward Island	20 October 2017	17 October 2024	
	Janet Austin	British Columbia	24 April 2018	30 January 2025	
	Judy Foote	Newfoundland and Labrador	3 May 2018	14 November 2023	First female lieutenant governor in Newfoundland and Labrador.
	Brenda Murphy	New Brunswick	8 September 2019	22 January 2025	First openly LGBTQ lieutenant governor; and the first openly LGBTQ person to hold any viceregal office in Canada.
	Salma Lakhani	Alberta	26 August 2020	incumbent	First South Asian and the first Muslim to hold a viceregal office in Canada.
	Anita Neville	Manitoba	24 October 2022	incumbent	First Jewish lieutenant governor of Manitoba
	Edith Dumont	Ontario	14 November 2023	incumbent	
	Joan Marie Aylward	Newfoundland and Labrador	14 November 2023	incumbent	
	Manon Jeannotte	Quebec	25 January 2024	incumbent	
	Louise Imbeault	New Brunswick	22 January 2025	incumbent	
	Wendy Lisogar-Cocchia	British Columbia	30 January 2025	incumbent	
	Bernadette McIntyre	Saskatchewan	31 January 2025	incumbent	

== Territorial commissioners ==
In each of the three territories of Canada, a commissioner acts as the formal head of state. Unlike the Governor General or a lieutenant governor (who are officially representatives of the Canadian monarch) the commissioners are appointed by and represent the Government of Canada. However, while they are not formally viceroys, they perform in their respective territories the same duties as a provincial lieutenant governor.

A total of fourteen women have served, or are currently serving, as a commissioner; one woman, Helen Maksagak, has served terms as a commissioner in two territories.

Image	Name	Territory	Start of mandate	End of mandate	Notes
	Ione Christensen	Yukon	20 January 1979	10 October 1979	First female territorial commissioner in Canadian history; resigned from position within one year to run for public office in the 1980 Canadian federal election.
	Helen Maksagak	Northwest Territories	16 January 1995	26 March 1999	First female Commissioner of the Northwest Territories.
	Helen Maksagak	Nunavut	1 April 1999	1 April 2000	First Commissioner of Nunavut following its creation on 1 April 1999.
	Judy Gingell	Yukon	23 June 1995	1 October 2000	
	Glenna Hansen	Northwest Territories	31 March 2000	29 April 2005	
	Ann Meekitjuk Hanson	Nunavut	21 April 2005	10 April 2010	
	Geraldine Van Bibber	Yukon	1 December 2005	17 December 2010	
	Nellie Kusugak	Nunavut	10 April 2010 (acting)	10 May 2010	Would become acting Commissioner (as Deputy Commissioner) in 2015 and finally service as full Commissioner.
	Edna Elias	Nunavut	10 May 2010	11 May 2015	
	Nellie Kusugak	Nunavut	11 May 2015 (acting); 23 June 2015 (official)	22 June 2020	Two-time acting Commissioner/Deputy Commissioner, 2010 and 2015.
	Margaret Thom	Northwest Territories	18 September 2017	14 May 2024	
	Angélique Bernard	Yukon	12 March 2018	31 May 2023	
	Rebekah Uqi Williams	Nunavut	22 June 2020 (acting)	12 January 2021	
	Eva Aariak	Nunavut	14 January 2021	incumbent	
	Adeline Webber	Yukon	31 May 2023	incumbent	

== See also ==
- List of female premiers in Canada
- List of elected and appointed female heads of state
- List of Canadian monarchs
