= Order of Nunavut =

Civilian honour for merit in Canada

- Insignia of the Order of Nunavut

Awarded by the commissioner of Nunavut
- Type: Order of merit (territorial)
- Eligibility: All current and former residents of the territory (or the territory which became Nunavut) who are not elected representatives in government
- Awarded for: Outstanding contribution to the cultural, social, or economic well-being of Nunavut.
- Status: Currently constituted
- Chancellor: Eva Aariak
- Grades: Member
- Post-nominals: O.Nu.

Statistics
- First induction: 2011
- Total inductees: 25

Precedence
- Next (higher): Order of Newfoundland and Labrador
- Next (lower): Order of the Northwest Territories
- Ribbon bar of the order

The Order of Nunavut (Note: French: Ordre du Nunavut Inuktitut: ᓄᓇᕗᒻᒥ ᐃᓕᓴᖅᓯᔾᔪᑦ ᐅᔭᒥᒃ, romanized: Nunavumni Ilisaqsijjutujamik Inuinnaqtun: Nangariyauyunut Nunavunmi) is a civilian honour for merit in the Canadian territory of Nunavut. Instituted in 2010 it is the highest honour which can be bestowed by the Government of Nunavut. It is intended to honour current and former residents of the territory (or the territory which became Nunavut).

== History ==
The Order was created by the passage of the Order of Nunavut Act in late 2009. The award is modelled on the orders of the Canadian provinces. Inductees are entitled to use the postnominal letters ONu.

== Eligibility and advisory committee ==
A maximum of three individuals may be inducted by the commissioner of Nunavut each year. An advisory committee consisting of the Speaker of the Legislative Assembly of Nunavut, the Senior Judge of the Nunavut Court of Justice and the President of Nunavut Tunngavik Incorporated. Like other provincial orders active politicians and judges cannot be appointed to the order while in office. Like the National Order of Quebec the award is presented in the territory's Parliament. Although the Commissioner of the territory bestows the award, they are also automatically a member of the order ex-officio.

== Members ==
The following is a list of members of the order:

Chancellors/Commissioners

- Ann Meekitjuk Hanson (born 1946, commissioner 2005–2010)
- Edna Elias (born c. 1955, commissioner 2010–2015)
- Nellie Kusugak (born c. 1955, commissioner 2015–2020)
- Eva Aariak (born 1955, commissioner since 2021)

2011

- Michael Gardener
- Mark Kalluak
- Jose Amaujaq Kusugak

2012

- Kenojuak Ashevak (1927–2013), artist
- Charlie Panigoniak (1946–2019), singer-songwriter

2013

- Jimmy Akavak
- Louis Angalik Sr.
- Davidee Arnakak

2014

- John Amagoalik (born 1947), former chair of the Nunavut Implementation Commission

2015

- Tagak Curley (born 1944), politician and businessman
- Bill Lyall (1941–2021), vice-chair of the Nunavut Implementation Commission
- Robert Lechat

2016

- Louie Kamookak, historian involved in discovering the wreckage of HMS Erebus
- Ellen Hamilton
- Red Pedersen (born 1935), mayor of Kugluktuk and former Speaker of the Legislative Assembly of the Northwest Territories

2017

- Betty Brewster
- Ludy Pudluk (1943–2019), former MLA for High Arctic and mayor of Resolute

2018

- Zacharias Kunuk (born 1957), filmmaker, director of Atanarjuat: The Fast Runner

2019

- Peter Tapatai

2021

- Maryanne Inuaraq Tattuinee
- Dorothy Atuat Tootoo

== See also ==
- Symbols of Nunavut
- Orders, decorations, and medals of the Canadian provinces
- Canadian honours order of wearing
