= Kusugak =

Kusugak is an Inuit surname. Notable people with this name include:

- Jose Kusugak (1950–2011), Canadian politician and activist
- Lorne Kusugak, Canadian politician
- Michael Kusugak (born 1948), Canadian writer
- Nellie Kusugak (born 1955), Canadian politician and commissioner of Nunavut (2015–2020)
