= Aluki Kotierk =

Inuk politician (born 1975)

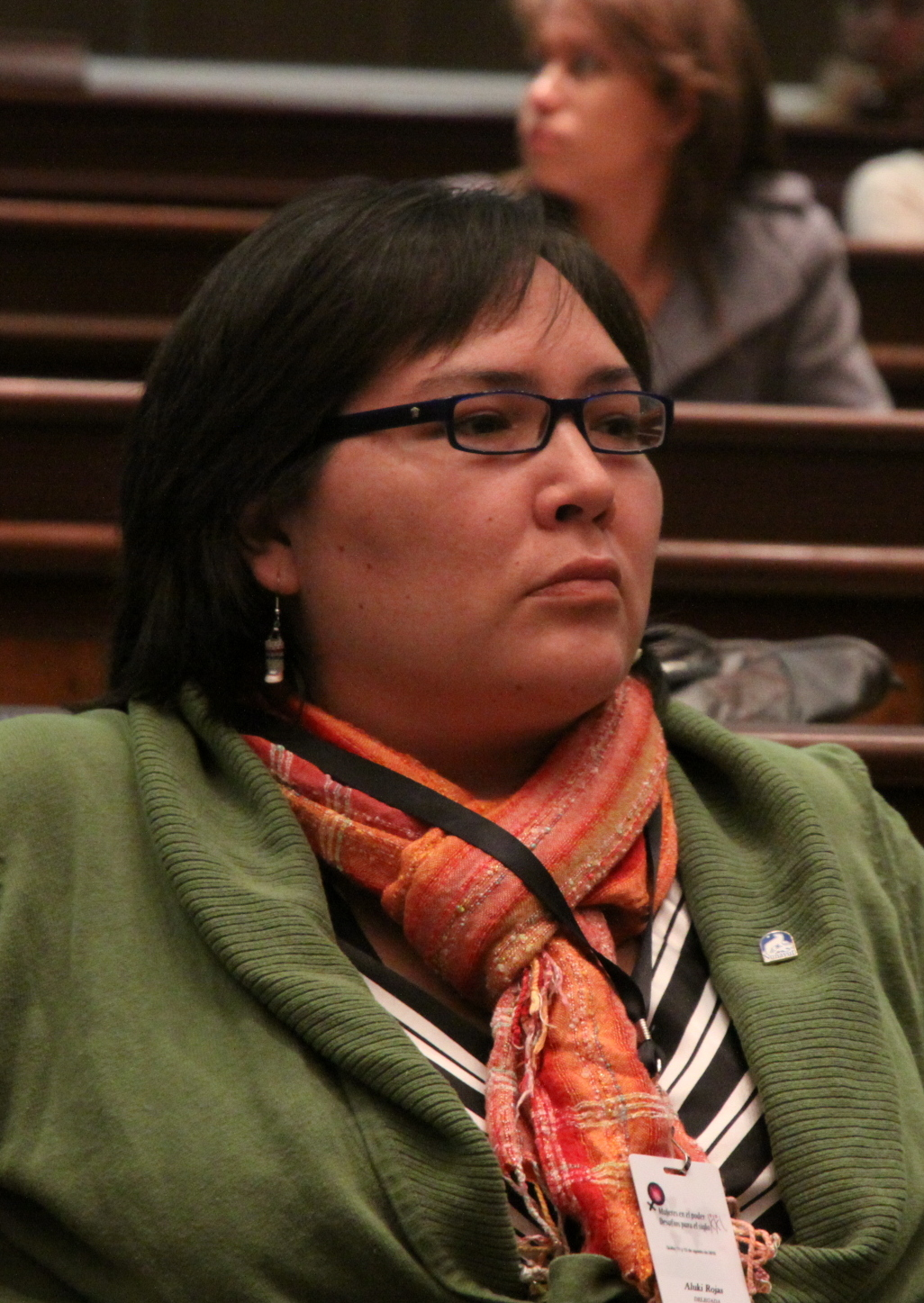
- in 2010
- Born: 1975 (age 50–51); Iqaluit, Nunavut, Canada
- Occupations: President, Nunavut Tunngavik Inc.
- Years active: 2016-current

Aluki Kotierk (Inuktitut: ᐊᓗᒃᑲ ᑯᑎᐊᕐᒃ; born 1975) is an Inuk politician. She was born in Iqaluit, Nunavut, but grew up in Igloolik.

== Early life ==
Ms. Kotierk was born in Iqaluit, Northwest Territories (now Nunavut) in 1975. She holds a bachelor's degree in Native Studies and Comparative Development and a master's degree in Native Studies and Canadian Studies from Trent University in Peterborough, Ontario.

== Career ==
Kotierk is the president of Nunavut Tunngavik Incorporated (NTI), and chair of its affiliated companies, including Makigiaqta Inuit Training Corporation, Nunavut Tunngavik Foundation, the Nunavut Inuit Resource Revenue Trust and the Nunavut Elders Supplemental Trust. Kotierk's four main areas of focus during her presidency are empowerment, Inuit language and culture, collective healing and Inuit identity.

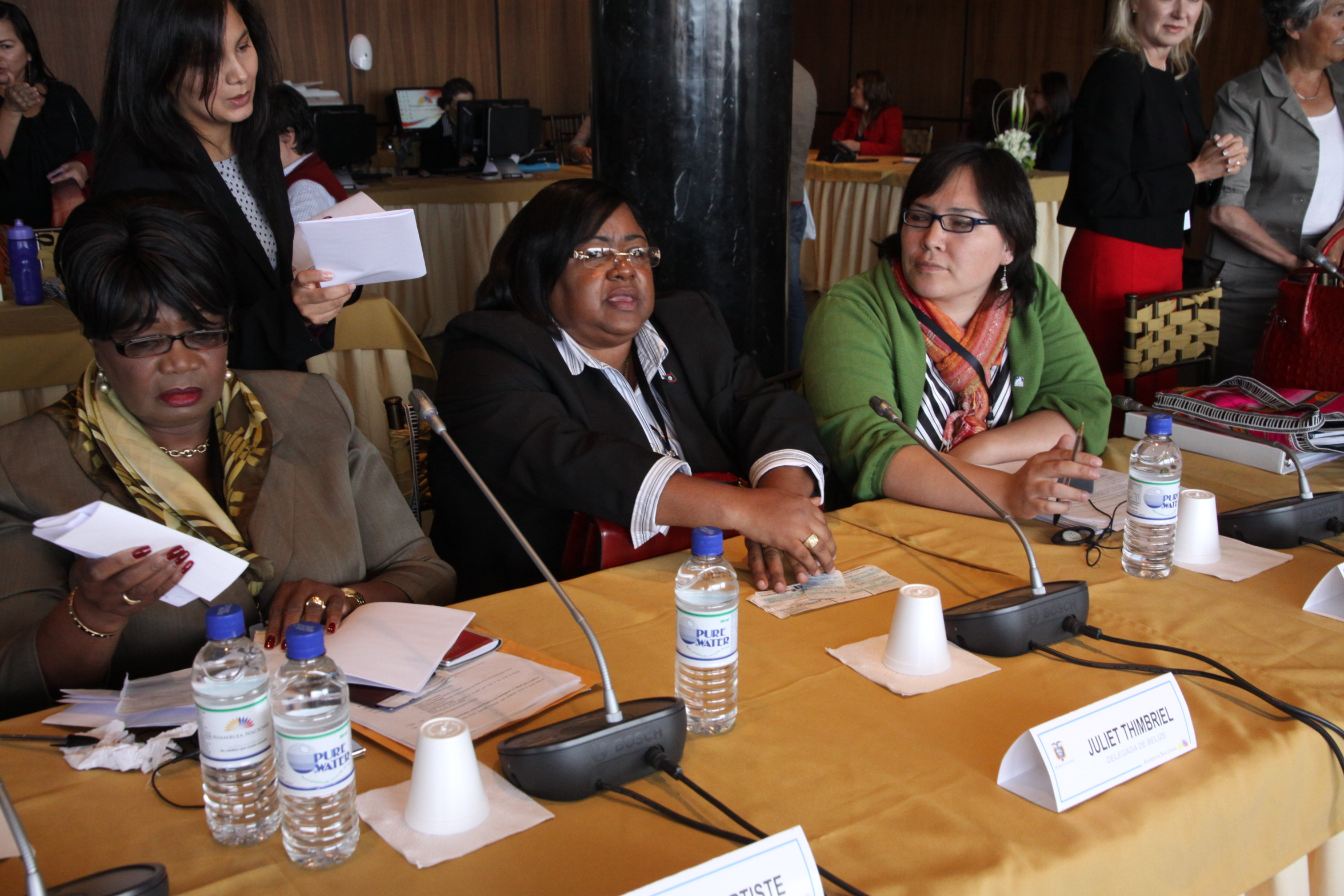
Juliet Thimbriel and Kotierk in Ecuador at a meeting of women in power in 2010

She is a member of the United Nations Permanent Forum on Indigenous Issues for the term 2023-2025 representing Arctic peoples.

Kotierk is also currently one of two Co-chairs representing Indigenous People's Organizations on the Global Task Force for the International Decade of Indigenous Languages (IDIL) 2022–2032.

After earning her master's degree in Native and Canadian Studies at Trent University, Kotierk worked for various Inuit organizations including Pauktuutit Inuit Women of Canada, Inuit Tapirisat of Canada (now known as Inuit Tapiriit Kanatami), and Nunavut Sivuniksavut. She has also held management and deputyminister roles within the government of Nunavut, Office of the Languages Commissioner of Nunavut and Nunavut Tunngavik Incorporated.

In November 2016, she took leave from her position as director of Inuit employment and training at Nunavut Tunngavik to run in the Nunavut Tunngavik Incorporated (NTI) presidential election. On December 13, 2016, she beat the incumbent Cathy Towtongie by 243 votes. She was re-elected for a four-year term on February 9, 2021, until December 2024.

== Personal life ==
Kotierk is based in Iqaluit, speaks Inuktitut, has five children and one grandchild.
