= Christian Klengenberg =

Danish whaler, trapper, and trader in the Arctic

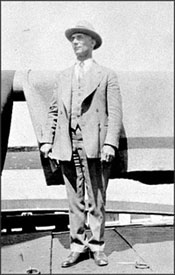
- Charlie Klengenberg on board his ship in 1924
- Born: 21 December 1869; Svendborg, Funen, Denmark
- Died: 4 May 1931 (aged 61); Vancouver, British Columbia, Canada
- Other names: Christian Klengenberg Jørgensen
- Occupation(s): Whaler, trapper, trader
- Known for: Opening trade routes to the Copper Inuit territory

Christian Klengenberg Jorgensen (Danish: Christian Klengenberg Jørgensen) (21 December 1869 – 4 May 1931) was a Danish whaler, trapper, and trader, active for 34 years in Alaska (Point Hope and Utqiagvik) and Northern Canada (Herschel Island, the Coronation Gulf, and Victoria Island). He is notable for opening trade routes to the Copper Inuit territory. Klengenberg is also credited with the discovery of Blond Eskimo and recounting his experience to the anthropologist Vilhjalmur Stefansson who went on to publish about their existence.

== Early years ==
Born in Svendborg, Funen, Denmark, his parents were Jørgen Christian Jørgensen (1836–1906), a soldier, cabinet maker, and wood carver, and Caroline Sofie Møller (born 1840), of Viking blood. He was one of eight children. Klengenberg also had eight half siblings from his father's second marriage to Margrethe Marie Gielster. Though confirmed in the Lutheran Church, his spiritual beliefs were more in common with Wodin and Thor, having learned of them from his mother.

== Career ==
Klengenberg began his seagoing career at age 16 as a cook's assistant on the Iceland, bound from Sweden to New York City. As a ship's cook, his travels took him to Russia, Australia, Scotland, as well as Honolulu, and the Barbary Coast, San Francisco, California. In 1893, he arrived at the Inupiat village of Point Hope on the Emily Schroeder. It was here that he met his future wife, Gremnia, a Tikigaq from Tigerah (Point Hope), Noatak-Kobuk, Alaska.

They made a home in Point Hope where Gremnia taught Klengenberg how to snare ptarmigan, set out trap lines, and the job of floor whaling. His early whaling career also included selling whale bone for corsets.

In 1894, Klengenberg was a pilot on the whaler Orka that sailed to Herschel Island. Though he had planned to return home to Point Hope after this trip, he signed on instead to the whaler Mary D. Hume, spending the summer whaling in the Beaufort Sea. While anchored off Banks Island, an area that whalers thought to be uninhabited, he went ashore and found Inuit footprints and made a secret decision that he would return here eventually to trade with them. He did not have an opportunity to return to Copper Inuit territory until 1905. It was at this time, while in charge of Charles McKenna's trading schooner Olga, that Klengenberg convinced the captain to allow him to search for these Inuit, though he was also ordered to remain in sight of McKenna's ship, the Charles Hanson. Pushed off course, the Olga ended up off the southwest coast of Victoria Island, forcing the Klengenberg family, three other families, and the ship's crew of nine to winter at Penny Bay. While here, their camp became a trading post, and a base from which to contact and trade with nearby Copper Inuit bands. The following summer, the Olga returned to Herschel Island, but less four crewman. Klengenberg's report stated that ice had prevented him from returning earlier. While at Herschel Island, Klengenberg met Stefansson and recounted his meeting of blond Eskimos, people who had never seen white men previously. But the Herschel Island whalesmen were not interested in Eskimo stories. Rather, they wanted an explanation as to why four crewmen had not returned on the Olga. Klengenberg explained all four deaths, then immediately returned to Alaska with his family.

After Klengenberg's departure, the other crewman gave a different account, including that Klengenberg shot the engineer, Jackson Paul, that two crewmen who witnessed the shooting disappeared, and that a third witness died while chained in the ship's hold. An American commissioner heard of these accounts and reported them in San Francisco. Klengenberg was charged with murdering Jackson Paul, and the British ambassador turned over the matter to the American Secretary of State. After the news reached Alaska, Klengenberg turned himself in, was transported to San Francisco, and was tried and acquitted in 1907 because of contradictions in the crewmen's testimony.

"I had found a land and a people where I could be the first to trade, and I made up my mind that eventually I would have my own ship and my own goods and go back with my family to Victoria Island and found a permanent trading post." (Christian Klengenberg)

Klengenberg remained in the western Arctic for the next several years, supporting his family by hunting, trading, trapping, and whaling. In 1916, he moved his family to the western Coronation Gulf, establishing a trading post at Cape Kendall, north of Coppermine. After moving the trading post several times, in 1919, he settled at Rymer Point, Cape Krusenstern (Nuvuk), on Victoria Island's Wollaston Peninsula. The following year, he opened another post in Bathurst Inlet. Communication with the Victoria Island Inuit was not easy and he relied on his oldest daughter who spoke Inupiaq to act as an interpreter.

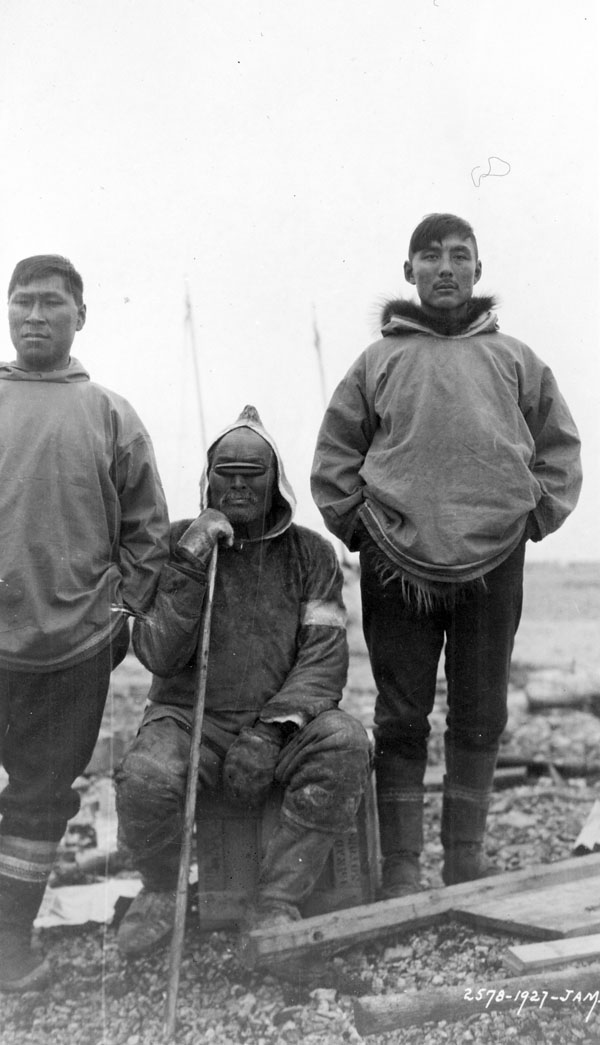
From left to right, Klengenberg's son-in-law, Ikey Bolt, unknown, Patsy Klengenberg (son)

In 1924, Klengenberg sailed his ship, the Maid of New Orleans, from Alaska to Canada, bound for his trading post on Victoria Island. But after landing on Herschel Island, he learned of a policy prohibiting American ships from bringing foreign goods into Canada. Klengenberg asked for the right to only deliver goods sufficient for his immediate family. Permission was granted so long as he first stopped at Baillie Island to pick up a Royal Canadian Mounted Police constable. Klengenberg complied and was thereafter reunited with his family. But on the trip back to Baillie Island, the RCMP's Constable MacDonald disappeared, with only his parka and notebook found in the icy waters. The mate, Henry Larsen, was not suspicious. But the incident was investigated as the drowned man was the son of James MacDonald, chief justice minister in the cabinet of John A. Macdonald, the first Prime Minister of Canada and founder of the RCMP. Klengenberg was eventually vindicated and the event was deemed an accident.

== Personal life ==
When he went off to sea, Klengenberg's surname of Klengenberg Joergensen, was shortened to "Klengenberg", and it was occasionally spelled "Klingenberg" or "Klinkenberg". His given name was shortened to "Kris", but was occasionally spelled "Kristian". His nicknames were "Charlie", "Little Charlie" and "Charliuyak". Stefansson referred to Klengenberg's reputation as akin to Jack London's Sea-Wolf character.

In 1894, Klengenberg married Gremnia (or "Grenameh") Qimniq (or "Kenmek") (1878 - after 1931), daughter of Takpaluk and Wenek. They had several children: Weena, Etna, Patric ("Patsy"), Collinson, Andrew, Jorgen, Lena, Diamond, and Robert. Daughter Weena married the Norwegian explorer Storker Storkersen who accompanied Stefansson. Daughter Etna married Ikey Bolt ("Angatilsiak Anutisiak"), of the Canadian Arctic Expedition, and Coronation Medal awardee. Etna and Ikey took over Klengenberg's Rymer Point store in 1920, and Gremnia lived with them when Klengenberg retired to Vancouver, British Columbia, in the 1920s. Their son Patsy became a successful fur trader in part because Diamond Jenness taught him to read and write English when Patsy served as interpreter during the Canadian Arctic Expedition. Jorgen became a trapper, trading with Captain Christian Theodore Pedersen.

Klengenberg became a naturalized United States citizen, but gave up this citizenship in 1925, becoming a Canadian. He retired in Vancouver where two of Weena's daughters, Bessie and Ida, attended school. He died there in 1931, was cremated and his ashes were scattered at Rymer Point. Many of Klengenberg and Gremnia's descendants live in Ulukhaktok and Qurluqtuuq (Coppermine).

On 12 May 2010, Klengenberg's great-granddaughter, Edna Elias, was appointed as the 4th Commissioner of Nunavut by Prime Minister Stephen Harper. Helen Klengenberg was appointed as Nunavut Language Commissioner for a five-year term 15 June 2017, but resigned in 2019 and was replaced by Karliin Aariak.

== Works ==
- Klengenberg Joergensen, Kristian, & MacInnes, Tom (1932). (Christian) Klengenberg (Jorgensen) of the Arctic. London [usw.]: Cape.
