= Iqaluit East =

Former territorial electoral district in Nunavut, Canada

Coordinates: 63.737°N 68.468°W

Iqaluit East was a territorial electoral district (riding) for the Legislative Assembly of Nunavut, Canada. The riding consisted of the easterly portions of Iqaluit and the community of Apex.

Its most recent member of the Legislative Assembly was Eva Aariak, the former premier of Nunavut.

== Election results ==
=== 1999 election ===
1999 Nunavut general election
Name	Vote	%
Ed Picco	416	71.23%
Natsiq Kango	168	28.77%
Total Valid Ballots	584	100%
Voter Turnout %	Rejected Ballots	

=== 2004 election ===
2004 Nunavut general election
Name	Vote	%
Ed Picco	569	70.68%
John Amagoalik	186	23.11%
Norman Ishulutak	50	6.21%
Total Valid Ballots	805	100%
Voter Turnout 112.40%	Rejected Ballots 2	

=== 2008 election ===
2008 Nunavut general election
Name	Vote	%
Eva Aariak	439	62.5%
Glen Williams	221	31.5%
Kakki Peter	39	5.6%
Total Valid Ballots	699	100%
Voter Turnout 73.3%	Rejected Ballots 3	

== See also ==
- List of Nunavut territorial electoral districts
- Canadian provincial electoral districts
