= Inuit Broadcasting Corporation =

Canadian television production company based in Nunavut

- Founded: January 1, 1982; 44 years ago
- Headquarters: Nunavut, Canada
- Revenue: 4,003,388 Canadian dollar (2003)
- Total assets: 2,434,070 Canadian dollar (2003)
- Owner: Self-owned
- Number of employees: 36 (2003)
- Website: inuitbroadcasting.ca

The Inuit Broadcasting Corporation (IBC) (Inuktitut: ᐃᓄᐃᑦ ᑕᑯᓐᓇᕋᑦᓴᓕᕆᔨᑦ) is a television production company based in Nunavut with programming targeted at the Inuit population of Nunavut, though it also serves the Northwest Territories, Yukon, and parts of Quebec as well. Almost all of its programs are broadcast in Inuktitut. Some are also in English. IBC shows centre on Inuit culture. The company has five production centers in Nunavut, all staffed by Inuit. Founded in 1981, the IBC was the first indigenous-language television network in North America.

== History ==
Television was first introduced to the north through CBC's frontier coverage package, which delivered of southern programming to twenty-one northern communities. There was no northern content: CBC extended its southern coverage area into the north, but did not develop a northern-based service for northerners.

It is difficult to gauge the impact of the sudden introduction of southern broadcast services on language, culture and day-to-day life in the traditional settlements of the Arctic. Some communities, such as Igloolik, initially voted to refuse television through a series of hamlet plebiscites, fearing irreversible damage to their lifestyle. Many national and regional aboriginal organizations voiced the same fear and insisted that native people had the right to define and contribute to any broadcast service distributed in their homelands.

The newly formed Inuit Tapirisat of Canada (ITC) did not want Inuit to become just a new market for existing southern services in English and French; they wanted communities to define their own communications environment, and be able to contribute to the Canadian broadcasting system in a significant way. One of ITC's first major policy statements called on the federal government to ensure Inuit control over the expansion of radio-telephone, community radio, videotape, and newspaper services into the Arctic.

In 1978, the Canadian Department of Communications (DOC) launched a program to test satellite applications, using the newly launched Anik B satellite. One area of particular interest to the government was the potential application of satellite technology to enable production and distribution of programming in the Arctic. The Inuit Tapirisat launched the Inukshuk Project.

Inukshuk linked six communities: Iqaluit, Pond Inlet, Igloolik, Baker Lake, Arviat, and Cambridge Bay. By today's standards, this proto-network was primitive: video and audio signals were broadcast by satellite from Iqaluit, and received locally in the remaining five communities. Sound was fed back from the communities to the studio in Iqaluit by phone line. Viewers were thus able to see what was happening in the Iqaluit studio, and hear audio from the other participating communities.

As the Inukshuk Project took shape, the Canadian Radio-Television and Telecommunications Commission (CRTC) responded to northern and Aboriginal concerns by appointing Rheal Terrien to head up a committee mandated to investigate the extension of broadcasting services to northern and remote communities. After hundreds of interviews and community consultations, the Therrien Committee recommended in 1980 that satellites be used to relay Canadian television programming to the north, and that "…urgent measures be taken to enable northern native people to use broadcasting to support their languages and cultures."

The release of the Therrien report coincided with the successful conclusion of the Inukshuk project. Community interest and viewership had been high, many Inuit had been trained in basic television production, and the project had proven that a northern television network was technically and administratively feasible. Based on the project's success, and the recommendations of the Therrien report, ITC won a three-year project extension for Inukshuk, and began to plan a longer-term broadcast solution for the north.

In 1981, the Inuit Broadcasting Corporation (IBC) was incorporated, launched at midnight of 11 January 1982 and licensed by the CRTC to produce and distribute Inuktitut-language television programming.

== Growth ==
In 1981, the new broadcaster set out its long-term vision and goals in a discussion paper. Both the Department of Communications and sought responses to the Therrien Report. IBC made a number of recommendations, including:

- A funding program for all Inuit broadcasters (IBC, Taqramiut Nipingat in Nunavik, the newly formed OKâlaKatiget Society in Nunatsiavut);
- Recognition of aboriginal broadcasters in the Broadcast Act;
- A special CRTC policy acknowledging and supporting aboriginal broadcasters;
- The creation of a dedicated northern transponder (a satellite channel committed exclusively to northern programming).

On March 10, 1983, the Northern Native Broadcast Access Program (NNBAP) was announced, which provided $33.1 million over four years to thirteen northern aboriginal organizations to produce radio and/or television programming.

While programs for Australian aboriginal media tended to fund specific projects, the NNBAP allowed broadcasters to build permanent organizations, establish governance and management infrastructures, prepare production facilities, and design program schedules.

The program had its limitations. Funding assumed that an hour of television cost $5,000 to produce. However, the actual cost of an hour of programming at CBC in 1983 was $36,000, more than five times more than the NNBAP formula. Funding was also tied to levels of production: IBC was required to produce five hours of Inuktitut language programming per week. Still, for the first time, IBC and the other indigenous broadcasters had a relatively solid funding base to build on, and a guarantee of at least four years of support.

To produce five hours of broadcast-quality television each week, IBC established five Inuit-staffed production centres through a two-year training program, including Inuit camera people, editors, switchers, sound recordists, lighting technicians, content producers (researchers, writers, directors, producers, journalists, on-air personnel), managers, administrators, and a governing board. Eighteen trainees from five communities began the intensive program in 1983, and sixteen completed the course two years later.

The new network's first major trial was the 1983 Inuit Circumpolar Conference in Iqaluit, when IBC provided both live gavel-to-gavel coverage of the proceedings and pool video to journalists from around the world.

Its programs were being carried on CBC, which required thirty minutes formats and a higher level of technical quality than had been the norm during Inukshuk. For the first time recurring weekly series were designed and produced. Two of IBC's longest-running programs were first broadcast in those early years; these were Qaqqiq, a regional current affairs program, and Kippingujautiit, entertainment and storytelling.

One of IBC's best-known programs was launched in 1986. From its creation, IBC had targeted children as an essential audience in their overall goal of language promotion and preservation. After two years of research, focus group testing and specialized training for an Iqaluit-based crew, the network launched Takuginai, its award-winning series for Inuit children. Using puppets, graphic stories, live action, animation and special effects, Takuginai taught language, traditional and modern skills, and Inuit values and traditions. Takuginai has spun off books, posters, sunglasses, public service announcements, and even a celebrity tour for the puppets. In 2000, Leetia Ineak, the program's producer, received a National Aboriginal Achievement award for her years of puppet design on the series.

== Distribution ==
The 1983 Northern Broadcasting Policy stated as one of its principles that northern native people should have "fair access" to northern broadcasting distribution systems to maintain and develop their cultures and languages. The policy did not define "fair access"; in Nunavut, IBC relied on the Canadian Broadcasting Corporation to carry its programming.

CBC was generally supportive of IBC and its goals. But the programming produced by CBC's own northern service took precedence, and IBC programming, as a priority, came last on the list, and in the schedule. IBC programs were run after twelve at night, and were subject to preemption whenever a hockey game ran late. Rosemarie Kuptana, then president of IBC, commented to the CRTC that "God made our land the land of the midnight sun...it took the CBC to make it the Land of Midnight television."

Despite the late-night timeslots, several independent audience surveys confirmed that IBC was attracting up to 95 percent of Inuit viewers for its programming. However, the CBC Northern service planned to expand its own northern programming, and IBC programs were being pre-empted with increasing frequency.

The answer lay in the creation of a dedicated northern satellite channel. This was achieved in 1988, when Minister of Communications Flora MacDonald committed $10 million to the creation of Television Northern Canada (TVNC), a pan-northern network established by northerners, for northerners. After three years of research, design and installation, the new network launched in 1992, providing IBC and other broadcasters with both a channel for their broadcast series, and an opportunity to return to experimental programming in the spirit of the Inukshuk project.

TVNC led directly to the creation of the Aboriginal Peoples Television Network (APTN) in 1999, when the CRTC granted a license to APTN and mandated the carriage of the network as part of the basic service of all television providers nationwide.

IBC programs are also distributed on Uvagut TV.

== Programming today ==
=== Takuginai ===
North America's first and longest-running Aboriginal language program for children. The series features "Johnny" the lemming and other locally made puppets, young hosts, animation and studio segments. Takuginai teaches both cultural values (respect for elders, sharing and patience) and Inuktitut numbers and syllabics. Awards include a Special Recognition Award from the Alliance for Children and Television; Award of Merit from the Children's Broadcast Institute; and the Telefilm-APTN Best Aboriginal Language Award.

=== Qanurli ===
A magazine program for Inuit teenagers, contemporary in its visual style and attire reflecting, but not replicating current youth programming on mainstream network channels, and reflecting everyday life of Inuit youth.

=== Ilinniq ===
A series of mini-documentaries profiling some of the most interesting people who live in Nunavut - politicians, elders, authors and actors. Each episode explores the life and accomplishments of these remarkable individuals.

=== Qanuq Isumavit ===
Nunavut's only televised phone-in show, featuring live discussion of current issues and events such as climate change, polar bears, language use, the importance of the igloo, and the dog slaughter.

=== Niqitsiat ===
Niqitsiat features the preparation and cooking of Inuit traditional foods, promoting healthy eating and tracing the source of food from the sea, the ice, and the tundra.

== Notable people ==
The Inuit Broadcasting Corporation and its precursor, the Inukshuk Project, have employed many of Nunavut's most distinguished media personalities and leaders. These include

- Rosemarie Kuptana, former president of the Inuit Tapiriit Kanatami, and former vice-president of the Inuit Circumpolar Conference.
- Zacharias Kunuk, director and producer of the award-winning Atanarjuat: The Fast Runner, and co-founder of Igloolik Isuma Productions.
- Paul Apak Angilirq, writer of the award-winning Atanarjuat, and co-founder of Igloolik Isuma Productions.
- Jose Kusugak, broadcaster and former president of the Inuit Tapiriit Kanatami.
- Lorne Kusugak, broadcaster, former mayor of Rankin Inlet, and Minister of Community Government and Services in the Government of Nunavut.
- Martin Kreelak, filmmaker and director of Journey to Nunavut.
- Okalik Eegeesiak, former president of the Inuit Tapiriit Kanatami, and current president of the Qikiqtani Inuit Association.
- John Amagoalik, former president of the Inuit Tapiriit Kanatami.
- Abraham Tagalik, broadcaster, former chairperson of Television Northern Canada, and former chief operating officer of the Aboriginal Peoples Television Network.
- Monica Ell-Kanayuk, former director of the IBC, now a member of the Legislative Assembly of Nunavut.

== Nunavut Animation Lab ==
In November 2006, the Inuit Broadcasting Corporation and the National Film Board of Canada announced the start of the Nunavut Animation Lab, offering animation training to Nunavut artists. Films from the Nunavut Animation Lab include Alethea Arnaquq-Baril's 2010 digital animation short Lumaajuuq, winner of the Best Aboriginal award at the Golden Sheaf Awards and named Best Canadian Short Drama at the imagineNATIVE Film + Media Arts Festival.
