= Jose Kusugak =

Canadian Inuk politician

President of Nunavut Tunngavik Incorporated
- In office 1990–1999

President of the Inuit Tapiriit Kanatami
- In office 2000–2006
- Preceded by: Okalik Eegeesiak
- Succeeded by: Mary Simon

Assistant President of the Inuit Tapiriit Kanatami
- In office 1971–1974?
- Preceded by: Position created
- Succeeded by: None

Area manager for the Kivalliq Region of the Canadian Broadcasting Corporation
- In office 1979/80–1989
- Preceded by: None
- Succeeded by: None

Personal details
- Born: May 2, 1950 Naujaat, Northwest Territories
- Died: January 18 / 19, 2011 (aged 60) Rankin Inlet, Nunavut

Jose Kusugak (2 May 1950 – 18 or 19 January 2011) was an Inuk politician from Repulse Bay, Northwest Territories (now Naujaat, Nunavut), Canada. He was an activist for Inuit rights, language and culture.

== Early life ==
Kusugak was born in Repulse Bay. He moved, along with his family, to Rankin Inlet in 1960. After attending school in Chesterfield Inlet and Churchill Vocational Institute residential school in Churchill, Manitoba, he went to Saskatoon, Saskatchewan to attend high school.

== Career ==
After finishing high school, Kusugak went on to teach in both Rankin Inlet and Churchill, where he taught Inuktitut and Inuit history.

In 1971 he joined what was then called the Inuit Tapirisat of Canada, known today as the Inuit Tapiriit Kanatami (ITK), and served as an assistant to Tagak Curley the organization's first president. Later moving to Arviat, he helped to establish a standardized writing system for Inuktitut syllabics.

In 1980 he joined the Canadian Broadcasting Corporation as the area manager for the Kivalliq Region. After working with them for 10 years, he joined the Inuit Broadcasting Corporation, and introduced several new areas of programming to the network. He then became the president of Nunavut Tunngavik Incorporated, one of the four organizations that make up the ITK.

As president of NTI he was responsible for negotiating the comprehensive land claims for Inuit, including the creation of Nunavut, with the governments of Canada and the Northwest Territories. In acknowledgement of this work, he has been called the "Last Father of Confederation." The new territory was proclaimed on April 1, 1999, five days before Kusugak's eldest daughter Aliisa Autut, gave birth to her third child.

Kusugak held the position of president until losing the election to Paul Kaludjuak after which he was controversially appointed president of ITK. After six years as president, Kusugak announced on 12 May 2006 that he was stepping down.

Kusugak died from bladder cancer in Rankin Inlet, Kivalliq, Nunavut, Canada.

== Personal life ==
Kusugak was married to the acting Commissioner of Nunavut, Nellie Kusugak. They had three daughters and one son.

== Honours and legacy ==
Kusugak received CBC president's award in 1998 for "remarkable achievement in raising the standard of Inuktitut radio broadcasting." He wrote the short comic Kiviuq vs Big Bee that was published in the anthology Arctic Comics in 2016. He was commemorated on a Canadian stamp in 2022, as the first in a series of three Indigenous leaders on stamps.

== External links and references ==
- Profile at the CBC
- Library and Archives Canada profile
