= Rosemarie Kuptana =

Rosemarie Esther Kuptana
- Born: 1954 (age 71–72); Prince of Wales Strait
- Citizenship: Canadian
- Occupations: politician, Inuit rights activist, broadcaster, journalist
- Employer: CBC Northern Service
- Awards: Officer of the Order of Canada; Governor General's Confederation Medal; Queen Elizabeth II Golden Jubilee Medal; Queen Elizabeth II Diamond Jubilee Medal; Bill Edmunds Human Rights Award; National Aboriginal Achievement Award

Rosemarie Esther Kuptana (sometimes Rose Marie Kuptana) OC, LL.D. (born 24 March 1954 near Sachs Harbour, Northwest Territories, Canada) is a Canadian Inuvialuk politician, Inuit rights activist, broadcaster and journalist. Besides serving with several Inuit organisations she was president of the Inuit Broadcasting Corporation. She lives in the Ottawa area and has three children.

== Early life ==
Kuptana was born in 1954 in an igloo on the Prince of Wales Strait while her parents, William and Sarah Kuptana, were seal hunting. The family was living a traditional, nomadic lifestyle and it wasn't until 1958 that they permanently relocated to Sachs Harbour on Banks Island. Her father had moved to the community to help build the weather station.

Growing up in Sachs, Kuptana only spoke Inuvialuktun until at the age of seven or eight, she was forcibly taken by the Royal Canadian Mounted Police to the residential school in Inuvik about 525 km (326 mi) to the southwest. At school, she was not permitted to speak her own language and forced to adopt an alien culture. After 10 years in the school system, she lost the ability to speak Inuvialuktun, making communication with elders in her home community difficult, although she later relearned the language.

== CBC and IBC ==
In 1979, she joined CBC Northern Service as a radio broadcaster, where she reported on issues that were relevant to the Inuvialuit. While at the Canadian Broadcasting Corporation, her broadcasts were in Inuvialuktun and they were heard throughout the Western Arctic.

She later joined the Inuit Broadcasting Corporation as a production coordinator and became president of the corporation in 1983, remaining until 1988. As president, she ensured that programs were shown using Inuktitut. She also worked on standards and training programs. She was involved in the setting up of Television Northern Canada, later to become the Aboriginal Peoples Television Network.

== Political life ==
Kuptana had been involved in Inuit rights and land claims since 1975, and in 1986, she became the Canadian vice chair of the Inuit Circumpolar Conference, now the Inuit Circumpolar Council. She remained in that position until 1989. In 1991, she became chair of Inuit Tapirisat of Canada, now Inuit Tapiriit Kanatami. Through the Charlottetown Accord during the constitutional discussions Kuptana negotiated for the enshrinement of Inherent Right of Inuit in Canada's Constitution and came close to winning.

In 1995, she became President of the Inuit Circumpolar Conference and co-chaired the Arctic Canadian panel which led up of the Arctic Council. She has also worked with the International Institute for Sustainable Development, the Migratory Bird Treaty and on Inuit residential school experience where she helped Inuit in receiving compensation.

In the last 10 years, Ms. Kuptana worked on the Inuit Residential School experience and ensured that Inuvialuit received compensation. As well, Ms. Kuptana has written articles and worked on the emergent issue of Arctic Sovereignty and Security.

== Awards ==
In 1988, she became a Member of the Order of Canada and ten years later, in 1998, she was appointed as an Officer of the Order of Canada. She has received the Governor General's Confederation Medal and in 1994, was given a National Aboriginal Achievement Award, now the Indspire Awards. In 2002, she received the Queen Elizabeth II Golden Jubilee Medal and in 2012, the Queen Elizabeth II Diamond Jubilee Medal. She has also received honorary doctorates from Trent and York Universities.

== Publications ==
- Inuit Ilitqusia: Inuit Way of Knowing, 15 June 2016
- The Inuit Sea, January 2013
- Sila Alangotok : Inuit observations on climate change = observations es Inuit sur le changement climatique, documentary, 2000
- Kuptana, R. (1992). The Canadian Inuit and the renewal of Canada. Études/Inuit/Studies, 16(1/2), 39–42.
- No More Secrets: acknowledging the problem of child sexual abuse in Inuit communities: the first step towards healing, 1991

== See also ==
- The Walter and Duncan Gordon Foundation
