= Inuit Tapiriit Kanatami =

Canadian Inuit political organization

Inuit Tapiriit Kanatami ᐃᓄᐃᑦ ᑕᐱᕇᑦ ᑲᓇᑕᒥ

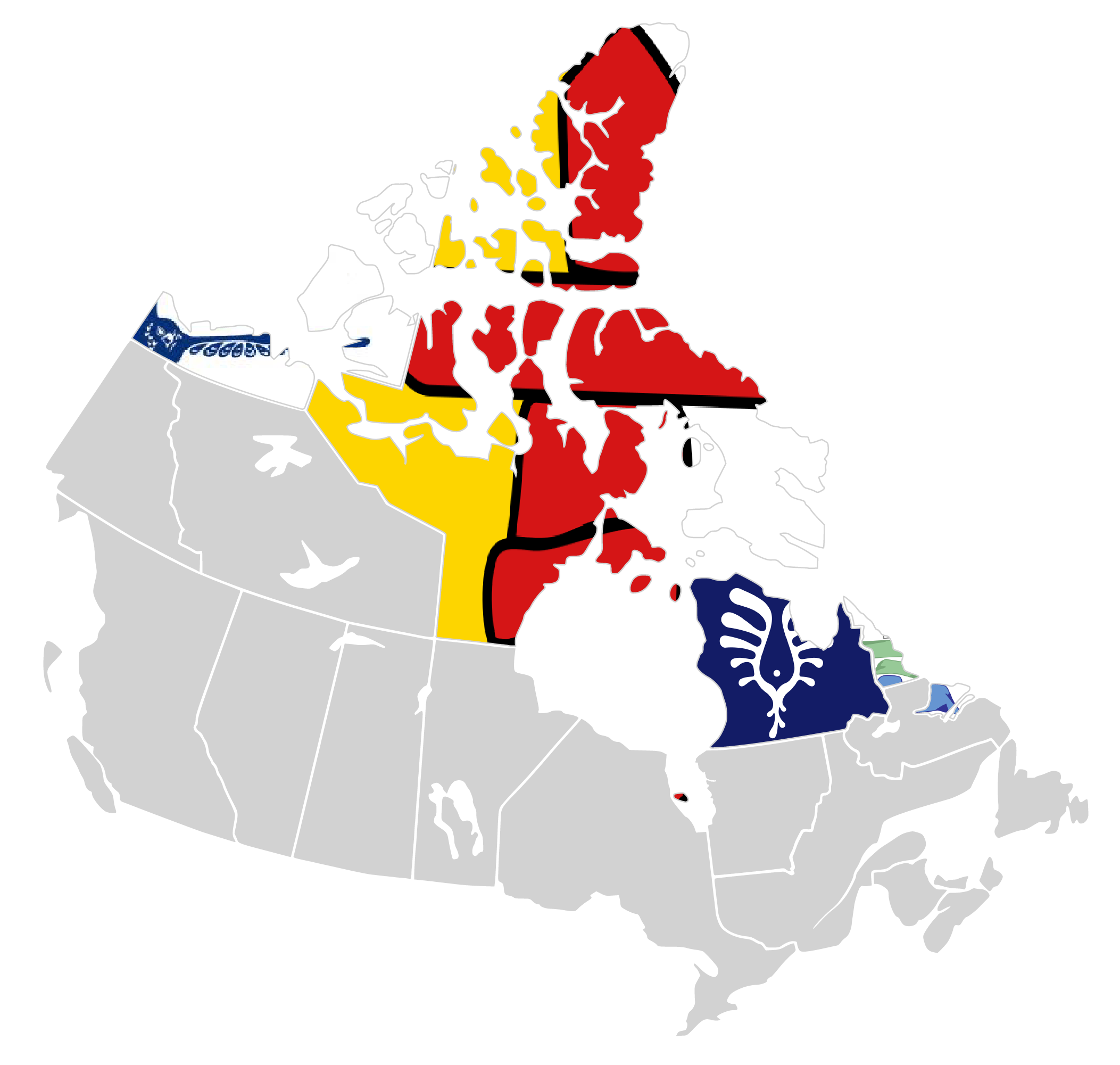
- Map of ITK showing the four constituent regions of Inuit Nunangat: Inuvialuit Nunangat, Nunavut, Nunavik, and Nunatsiavut
- Abbreviation: ITK
- Formation: 1971
- Type: Inuit organization
- Legal status: active
- Purpose: advocate and public voice, educator and network
- Headquarters: Ottawa, Ontario, Canada
- Coordinates: 45°25′20″N 075°41′43″W
- Region served: Canada
- Members: Inuvialuit; Nunavut; Nunavik; Nunatsiavut
- Official language: English, Inuktitut
- President: Natan Obed
- Website: www.itk.ca

Inuit Tapiriit Kanatami (Inuktitut syllabics: ᐃᓄᐃᑦ ᑕᐱᕇᑦ ᑲᓇᑕᒥ, meaning "Inuit are united in Canada"), previously known as the Inuit Tapirisat of Canada (Eskimo Brotherhood of Canada), is a nonprofit organization in Canada that represents over 65,000 Inuit across Inuit Nunangat and the rest of Canada. Their mission is to "serve as a national voice protecting and advancing the rights and interests of Inuit in Canada."

Founded in 1971 by Inuit leaders, the organization has gone on to accomplish various Inuit priorities such as assisting in the negotiation of land claims, representing the voice of Inuit and their culture by using television, taking legal action against those who have violated their rights, and creating a programme to improve education for Inuit children. The ITK has sought to attain its goals either in cooperation with various levels of government or in opposition. Altogether, the ITK looks to advocate on the behalf of Inuit in Canada. The contributions of the ITK led to the creation of Nunavut.

== History ==
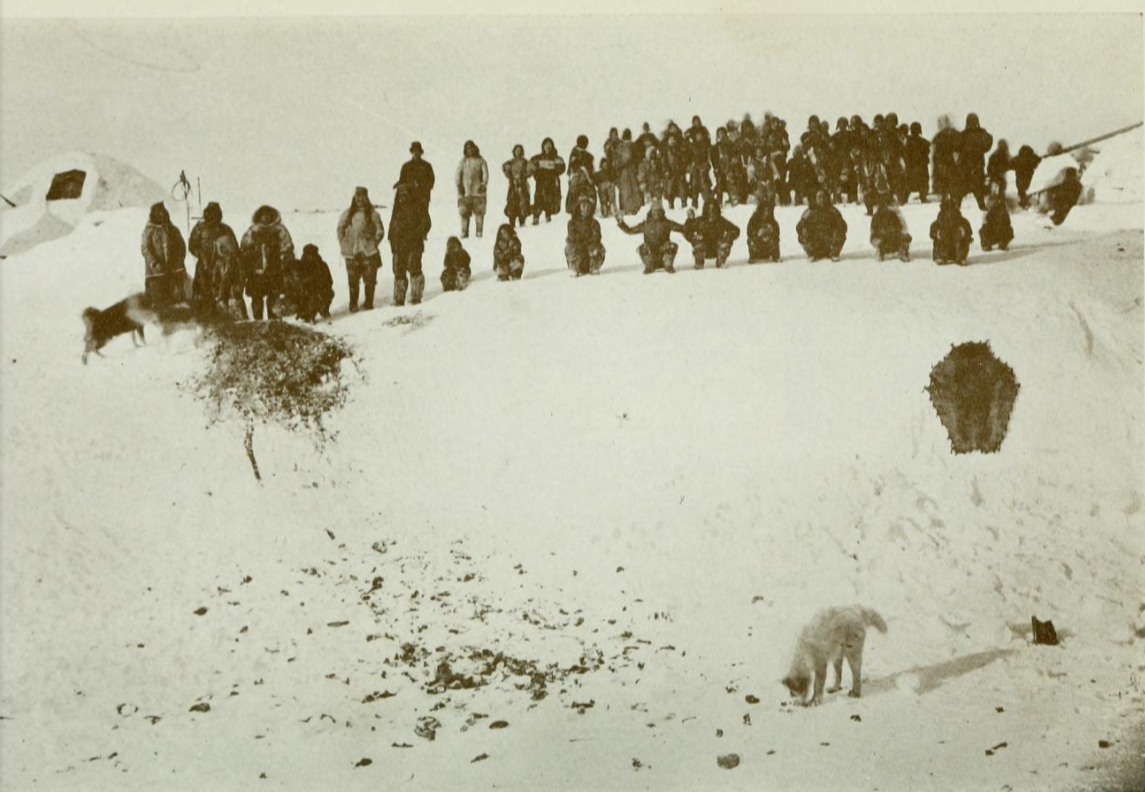
Inuit community, Pond Inlet. Traditionally, community decisions were made by consensus.

=== Background ===
Before European contact, the Inuit would choose leaders based on their survival skills with this role usually falling to the oldest male, but decisions were generally made via a group consensus. As interest in Canada's north increased there came further development. This development led to an increase of non-Inuit in northern Canada. These southern Canadians occupied the federal and territorial civil services along with the main industries present in the north. These positions required a western education which favoured the southern Canadians over the Inuit. As more and more southern Canadians came north they demanded consumer goods which made Inuit knowledge and survival skills less needed for the survival of southern Canadians in the north. This contributed to an inequality between the Inuit and non-Inuit, both socially and economically, in the north.

By the 1960s, there was a push to incorporate the Inuit into the political system and civil service. Such examples include the Government of the Northwest Territories, regional councils, and town/hamlet councils. A particular strong example of this was the Baffin Regional Council which was primarily administered by Inuit. Despite these efforts, the Inuit had concerns over a lack of autonomy, assimilative policies, and growing restrictions on traditional lands. In 1969, the White Paper was introduced which sought to terminate aboriginal status under the Indian Act and assimilate indigenous peoples. Based on these concerns and events the will for an Inuit political organization grew.

Concerns, such as the lack of Inuit autonomy, were shared by the Indian-Eskimo Association (IEA). The IEA were a group of southern Canadian educators, church leaders, and civil servants who advocated and promoted issues related to First Nations and Inuit. The IEA worked towards enabling indigenous peoples to advocate for their own goals. Using the IEA's public support and funding they helped facilitate the founding of an Inuit organization: the Inuit Tapirisat of Canada (ITC). In 1970, the IEA sponsored a meeting in Coppermine (now Kugluktuk) for the Inuit from across Canada's Arctic to talk of matters of mutual concern. From this meeting a telegram was created and sent to then Prime Minister Trudeau asking for the recognition of indigenous land rights in the north. This was this first instance of such a collective message being sent to the Federal government by the Inuit.

=== Foundation ===
Inuit Tapiriit Kanatami, then known as the Inuit Tapirisat of Canada (ITC), was founded in 1971 by seven Inuit community leaders, who were attending an IEA meeting in Toronto. The leaders attending this first meeting were Noah Qumak, Jacob Oweetaluktuk, Celestino Makpah, Josiah Kadlusiak, Ipeele KìLabuk, Tagak Curley, and Mary Cousins. The decision to form a national Inuit organization was made to lobby the Government of Canada through a united voice regarding the "status of land and resource ownership in Inuit Nunangat" and to increase their autonomy. As potential projects, such as the Mackenzie Valley Pipeline and the James Bay Project, began to threaten the Inuit Nunangat, leaders decided to take action. Inuit Nunangat is currently made up of four regions: the Inuvialuit Settlement Region (northern Northwest Territories and Yukon), Nunavut, Nunavik (northern Quebec) and Nunatsiavut (northern Labrador). Inuit culture has remained resilient across Inuit Nunangat, as an estimate of 60% of the population continue to speak Inuktut (the collective name for several Inuit languages and dialects), and access traditional foods through the hunting of marine mammals and caribou. ITK represents 51 communities and the 65,000 Inuit residing in Inuit Nunangat. The creation of political organizations such as the ITK and Committee for Original Peoples' Entitlement (COPE), led to the creation of 5 more organizations to represent Inuit. These organizations include the Northern Quebec Inuit Association (NQIA), which was founded in 1971; the Labrador Inuit Association (LIA), which was founded in 1973; the Kitikmeot Inuit Association, the Keewatin (now Kivalliq) Inuit Association, and the Baffin Regional (now Qikiqtani) Inuit Association all founded in the mid-1970s.

Later that year in Ottawa, Ontario the first conference was held and ITK has been headquartered out of Ottawa since 1972.

In 2001, the Inuit Tapirisat of Canada ("Inuit will be united") changed its name to Inuit Tapiriit Kanatami, meaning "Inuit are united in Canada". The name was changed after the signing of the Labrador Inuit Land Claims Agreement-in-Principle (AIP). The Government of Canada and Labrador Inuit Association gathered to sign a land claims agreement, which reinforced Inuit title to their land and increased their self-sufficiency in their communities.

=== Tagak Curley ===
Tagak Curley, born in 1944 in Southampton Island, Nunavut, is an Inuk politician and advocate of Inuit rights. Curley was a founding member of ITK and the first president. He was brought up in a traditional Inuit lifestyle, having strong connections to the land and culture. Before he took on the role of ITK president, he worked careers that dealt first hand with issues surrounding development and housing in Inuit communities. From 1966 to 1970, he worked with the Crown-Indigenous Relations and Northern Affairs Canada (formerly known as the Department of Indian Affairs and Northern Development) as a development officer. After that, he became a settlement manager in Naujaat (then called Repulse Bay) for a year. Curley successfully acted as president for four years, accomplished a lot, most notably in leading the movement to replace the term Eskimo with Inuit in all official Canadian documents. He then went on to pursue a legislative career and in 1979, Curley ran in the federal election as a Liberal candidate but was defeated by Peter Ittinuar.

=== Creation of the Inuit Committee on National Issues ===
In 1979 the ITC created the Inuit Committee on National Issues (ICNI) in order to represent their views regarding the constitution and other issues policy issues. The ICNI was a part of a larger Aboriginal Rights Coalition. In 1981, this coalition successfully lobbied the Federal–Provincial Conference of First Ministers on the Constitution to reinstate Section 35 into the Constitution after it was previously removed. Section 35 entrenches indigenous and treaty rights into the constitution. At the 1983 Federal–Provincial Conference of First Ministers on Aboriginal Constitutional Matters it was agreed to hold three more subsequent First Ministers' meetings to discuss aboriginal constitutional matters. The ICNI, as a part of the Aboriginal Rights Coalition, was present at these subsequent meetings. The ICNI was disbanded after these meetings after its funding expired.

=== The creation of Nunavut ===
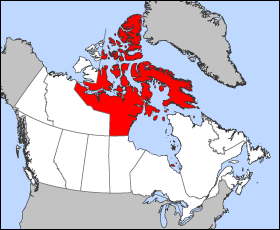
Map of Nunavut

As early as 1976, the ITC submitted its first Inuit land claims proposal. This first proposal was not only a land claims but also called for the creation of a new territory, effectively calling for the settlement of land claims and political development simultaneously. This proposal was later rejected due to complexity. A further proposal was set-up by the NWT Inuit Land Claims Commission (ILCC) in 1977. This proposal was halted due to political deadlock which ultimately led to the dissolution of the ILCC. In 1979, the Nunavut Land Claims Project (NLCP) continued the land claims process. That same year's ITC meeting, members agreed to the Political Development in Nunavut. This was a land claims proposal that blended elements of previous claims. In 1982, the Tunngavik Federation of Nunavut (TFN) was formed in order to take over land claims negotiations from the NLCP. In 1990, an agreement-in-principle was reached which eventually led to the 1993 ratification of the agreement via the Nunavut Land Claims Agreement and the Nunavut Act (which created the territory of Nunavut). The TFN was superseded by the Nunavut Tunngavik Incorporated (NTI). The NTI, along with the Nunavut Implementation Commission, worked to implement this new land claim before the actual creation of Nunavut in 1999. The creation of Nunavut Land Claims Agreement is the largest and most all-encompassing land claims and self-determination agreement in Canadian history.

== Goals ==
The goals of ITK have changed over the years as they have continued to make progress in defending Inuit rights. In the beginning the organizations main focus was on the preservation of Inuit land, throughout the 1970s and 1980s Inuit have negotiated four land claim agreements with the federal government. In 1975, the James Bay and Northern Quebec Agreement and Complementary Agreements (JBNQA) was reached; in 1984 the Inuvialuit Final Agreement was reached; in 1993 the Nunavut Land Claims Agreement was settled; and finally in 2003 the Labrador Inuit Land Claims Agreement was settled. Although the importance of land claims remains an objective for ITK they have also shifted their focus on more social issues surrounding Inuit. Those include preserving culture heritage and Inuit languages and raising awareness concerning education, healthcare, environment, climate change and economic development. The creation of Inuit organization, such as the ITK, have aided in forming a partnership with the Government of Canada to discuss domestic and international issues.

== Activities ==
=== Hamlet of Baker Lake v. Minister of Indian Affairs ===
In 1979, the ITC was seeking an injunction to stop the mineral exploration at Baker Lake, Northwest Territories (now in Nunavut). The plaintiffs, Baker Lake Hunters and Trappers Association, the ITC and the 112 Inuit who lived and hunted in Baker Lake at the time, took the Canadian federal government to court in Hamlet of Baker Lake v. Minister of Indian Affairs. The case raised questions concerning aboriginal rights, more specifically their right to hunt caribou. The plaintiffs sought to stop the mining activities happening in the area and for a declaration to be made that Baker Lake was subject to an Inuit aboriginal title to hunt and fish. The case concluded by Judge Pat Mahoney of the Federal Court of Canada recognized the existence of Aboriginal Title in Nunavut.

=== Inukshuk Project ===
In the late 1970s, the ITC launched the Inukshuk Project, named for the Inuksuk, which was the first involvement of Inuit on broadcast television. In April 1974, the Cabinet approved a procedure that all Canadian communities, with a minimum population of five hundred, would have media broadcast in English or French. James Arvaluk, ITC president at the time, objected to the Cabinets' decision because of the lack of local representation of Inuit communities.> As a result, they launched the Inukshuk Project, which targeted the Inuit population, allowing them to communicate about important issues and exchange information in their own language. From the Inukshuk Project, the Inuit Broadcasting Corporation (IBC) was created in 1980, a television broadcasting company based in Nunavut, in which the majority of programs are broadcast in Inuktitut. The IBC has employed some of Nunavut's most distinguished media personalities and leaders.

=== Canadian Human Rights Commission's Soberman Report ===
In 1990, the ITC made a complaint to the Department of Indian Affairs and Northern Development (DIAND) concerning the relocations of Inuit families. In 1953 and 1955, the Canadian Government decided to relocate families from Inukjuak in Northern Quebec to the far north as part of the High Arctic relocation. The DIAND found that the Government of Canada acted appropriately and would not apologize for the relocation of Inuit. ITC then appealed to the Canadian Human Rights Commission (CHRC), and they proceeded to investigate. The ITC asked for three things, recognition of their contribution to the Canadian claim to territorial sovereignty in the High Arctic; an apology for the hardship that Inuit suffered in Grise Fiord and Resolute; and compensation for the wrongs done to them. The CHRC report recommended that the Government should acknowledge and publicly thank the contribution of the Inuit relocated to the High Arctic; apologize for the shortcomings in planning the relocation; and acknowledge that it promised those Inuit who wished to go back to Northern Quebec the opportunity to do so within, at most, three years of being relocated.

=== National Strategy on Inuit Education ===
In 1976, the ITK proposed their first land claims to the federal government in which education reform was at the forefront of the proposal. The National Strategy on Inuit Education was launched in 2006 by Mary Simon, former President of ITK, as a national education initiative focused on improving outcomes in Inuit education and being on par with the rest of Canada. It would lead to a summit in the Northwest Territories about Inuit education in 2008. The objective of the strategy is to increase the confidence of Inuit children in their language, culture and opportunities. Less than 25% of Inuit student who are enrolled in school actually graduate. They list three core areas to improve education outcomes across Inuit Nunangat: supporting children to help them stay in school; providing a bilingual curriculum to achieve literacy in the Inuit language and at least one of Canada's official languages, and learning resources that are relevant to the Inuit culture, history and worldview; increasing the number of education leaders and bilingual educators in our schools and early childhood programs.

=== Inuit-Crown Partnership Committee ===
In February 2017, the ITK and the Government of Canada, under the government of Justin Trudeau, created the Inuit-Partnership Committee (ICPC). The purpose of the ICPC is to pursue goals that are common to both the Inuit and the Crown. The committee is co-chaired by the Prime Minister and the president of the ITK at one meeting a year, while subsequent annual meetings are co-chaired by the president of the ITK and the Minister of Crown-Indigenous Relations. Other members of the committee include select federal ministers, the presidents of the four regional land claims organizations, and the presidents of National Inuit Youth Council, Pauktuutit Inuit Women of Canada, and the Inuit Circumpolar Council Canada (as observers).

The ICPC has several areas of focus which include: Inuit-Crown land claims; Inuit Nunangat policy space; Inuktut revitalization, maintenance, protection, and promotion; reconciliation measures; education, early learning, and training; health and wellness; the environment and climate change; housing and infrastructure, economic development and procurement; and legislative priorities. To combat climate change the ITK focused on five areas in their national climate change strategy. The five areas being: capacity building, health and environment, food systems, infrastructure and energy. The federal government has pledged $1 million for the strategy in a multi-year funding plan which will go to the five areas in the strategy plan. In March 2020, it was also made a focus, under the heading of Reconciliation, for an action plan to be developed and implemented to contend with the calls to justice of the National Inquiry on Missing and Murdered Indigenous Women and Girls.

=== An Inuit Vision for Arctic Sovereignty, Security and Defence ===
In June 2025, Inuit Tapiriit Kanatami (ITK) released a national position paper titled "An Inuit Vision for Arctic Sovereignty, Security and Defence". The document outlined the framework for Canadian northern policy on the core premise that "Inuit sovereignty is Canada's sovereignty" and that true territorial security cannot be achieved through a military presence alone, advocating instead for a shift in national policy that recognizes human and community security as the baseline for protecting the Arctic.

While historic underinvestment has left the Canadian Arctic vulnerable to foreign interference, coercion, and potential economic sabotage, ITK notes that Canada trails other Arctic nations in regional development, leaving northern communities to face deficits in transportation and communication infrastructure. This gap forces reliance on foreign satellite systems and makes the region difficult to access or monitor. Global Powers such as Russia and China routinely exploit these infrastructure deficits to establish strategic footholds, seeking access to potential trading routes, critical minerals, and foreign investment in critical infrastructure and development.

To protect Canada's Arctic territory, the framework highlights several structural priorities for the federal government:

1: "Inuit-Crown Partnership:" - Using the Inuit-Crown Partnership Committee (ICPC) as the main mechanism to co-develop northern defence and safety initiatives.

2: "Direct Funding Policy:" - Bypassing provincial and territorial jurisdiction to allocate direct, distinctions-based funding to the four Inuit Treaty Organizations.

3: "Regional Development:" - Moving away from short-term "one-off" project grants toward a long-term fiscal policy that integrates the infrastructure and economy of the Northwest Passage into the rest of Canada.

4: "Dual-Use Infrastructure:" - Prioritizing multi-purpose security investments - such as fiber-optic networks, roads, multi-user docks, and climate-resistant runways - that serve national defence requirements while directly improving local living standards.

Through addressing these modern Arctic security strategies, Canada avoids repeating colonial policies while acutely modernizing Canadian Arctic Security and Defence. ITK explicitly highlights the lasting trauma caused by historical federal actions, including the forced relocation of Inuit families to the High Arctic to bolster Canadian sovereignty claims, the establishment of residential schools, and the RCMP's slaughter of Inuit sled dogs to restrict local mobility. This emphasizes that securing the Arctic requires closing the massive socio-economic gaps in healthcare, housing, and food security that currently drive families out of their communities.

=== Canada Goose Project ===
Canada Goose is a high end premium Canadian brand that sells winter apparel such as hats, jackets, gloves, vests, pants and parkas. It is in high demand in pop culture as actors, athletes, rappers and many high-profile celebrities wear this brand. In 2019, Canada Goose and ITK agreed to collectively collaborate with each other for their January, 2019 launch. The collaboration is known as Project Atigi in which 20 Inuit representatives will be working and creating parka designs for Project Atigi. These projects are influenced by the traditional clothing and culture of the Inuit. There will be future collection drops in the project with Inuit representatives chosen by ITK.

== Governance ==
ITK is governed by a board of directors and president. The board of directors consists of presidents from four regional Inuit land claims organizations: Nunavut Tunngavik Incorporated, Makivik Corporation, Nunatsiavut Government, and the Inuvialuit Regional Corporation. Each director is a voting member. Each organization will nominate one director to sit on the board. A director will automatically be removed if: they are less than eighteen years of age; declared incapable by a court in Canada, or in another country; has the status of bankrupt; or on the director's death. There are also three non-voting representatives that sit on the board: National Inuit Youth Council (NIYC), Inuit Circumpolar Council (ICC Canada) and Pauktuutit Inuit Women of Canada. The ITK president serves for a term of three years and can serve multiple terms if re-elected each time. The president must receive the majority vote of the vice-president, member representatives, and delegates, each of whom have only one vote. For an Inuk individual to become a candidate for the position of president they must submit a written declaration of candidacy to the executive director no fewer than twenty days before the meeting of the members and the declaration must be signed by at least twenty other Inuit.

The board of ITK manages and supervises the management of the activities and affairs of ITK. They possess the power to borrow money on the credit of ITK; issue, reissue, sell, pledge or hypothecate debt obligations of ITK; give a guarantee on behalf of ITK to secure performance of an obligation of any person; and mortgage, hypothecate, pledge or otherwise create a security interest in all or any property of ITK, owned or subsequently acquired, to secure any obligation of ITK. The duties of the president include attending members, board and officers meetings, carrying out the decisions and directions made by the board and oversee the management of the activities and affairs of the ITK. The president normally resides in Ottawa, unless the board approves otherwise. The vice-president is the current president of the Inuit Circumpolar Council (Canada). The duties of the vice-president include performing the duties and exercising the powers of the president in their absence and supporting the president in their duties and decisions. The secretary/treasurer hold office for one year and is appointed by the board. The secretary/treasurer works in co-operation with the president and vice-president and are responsible for the sound financial operation and administration of ITK. The executive director's duties include those of the board and the responsibility for the day-to-day operations and management of ITK.

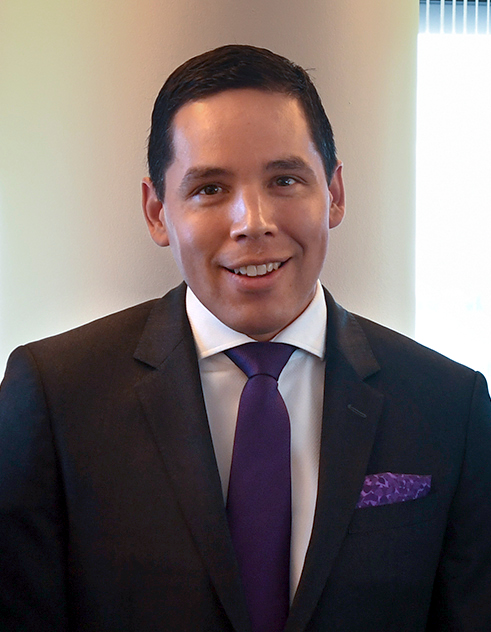
Current ITK President Natan Obed

Terry Audla was elected President of Inuit Tapiriit Kanatami on 6 June 2012. He was succeeded by Natan Obed, who was elected with 54% of the vote on 17 September 2015, in Cambridge Bay, Nunavut. Nathan Obed was re-elected by majority of votes for another 3-year term in 2018, in Inuvik, Northwest Territories. Nathan Obed was acclaimed for another term in 2021.

=== Presidents of Inuit Tapiriit Kanatami ===
No.	Name	Term of office
1	Tagak Curley (founding president)	1971-1974
2	James Arvaluk	1974-1977
3	Michael Amarook	1977-1978
4	Eric Tagoona	1978-1979
5	Micheal Amarook	1979-1981
6	John Amagoalik	1981-1985
7	Rhoda Innuksuk	1985-1988
8	John Amagoalik	1988-1991
9	Rosemarie Kuptana	1991-1997
10	Mary Sillet	1997-1998
11	Okalik Eegeesiak	1998-2000
12	Jose Kusugak	2000-2006
13	Mary Simon	2006-2012
14	Terry Audla	2012-2015
15	Natan Obed	2015-present
