= Juliet Thimbriel =

Belizean politician

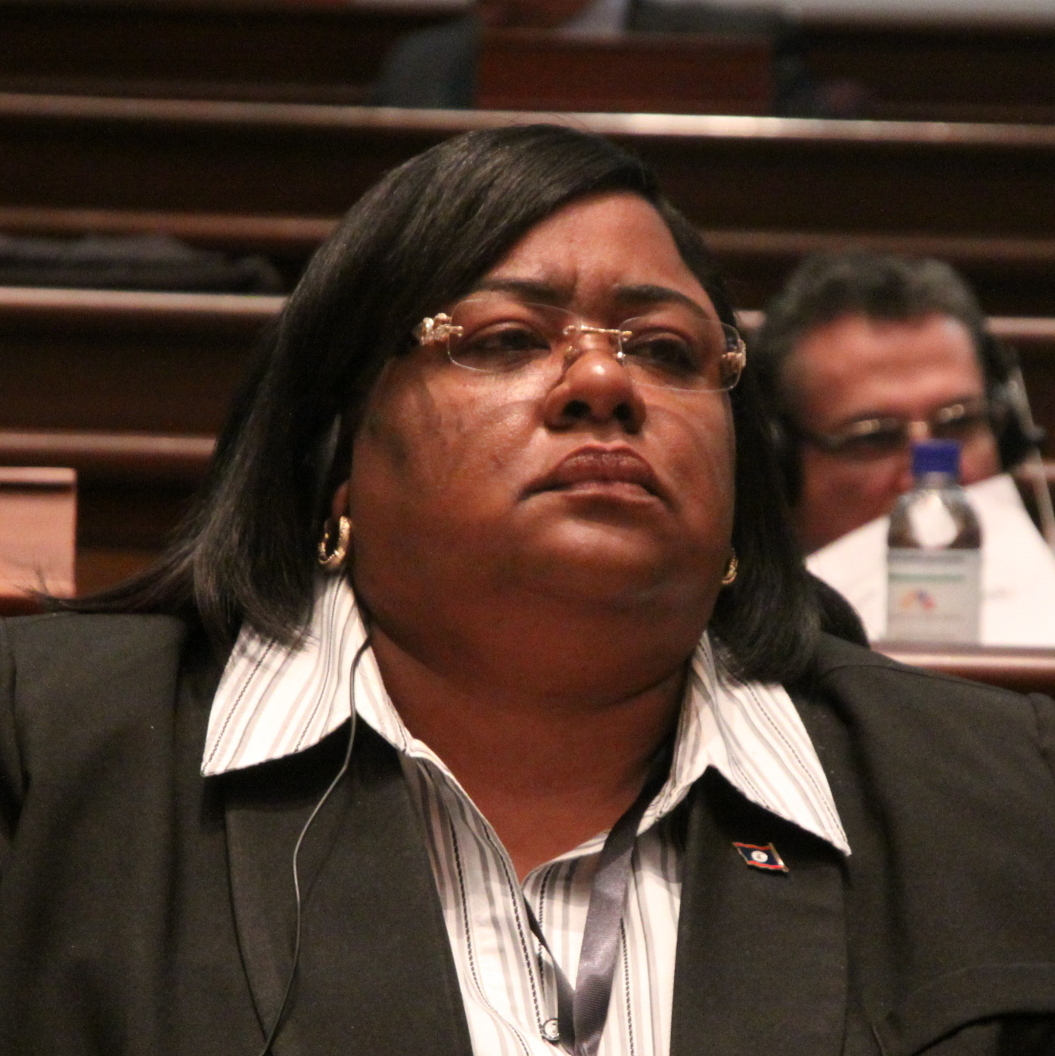
- Thimbriel in 2010
- Occupations: politician and radio broadcaster
- Employer: Wave Radio
- Political party: United Democratic Party

Juliet Thimbriel is a Belizean broadcaster and a politician in the United Democratic Party. She previously served as a senator but resigned following an argument with the mayor of Belize on Thimbiel's radio show. She later became vice-President of the senate.

== Career ==
Thimbriel became the general manager of VPW-FM aka Wave Radio where she was the host of their breakfast programme, "Fus' Ting Da Mawnin". Wave Radio is created by the United Democratic Party and it broadcasts from Belize City. The leader of the party was Dean Barrow and Thimbiel was a senator. She was one of the party's biggest supporters.

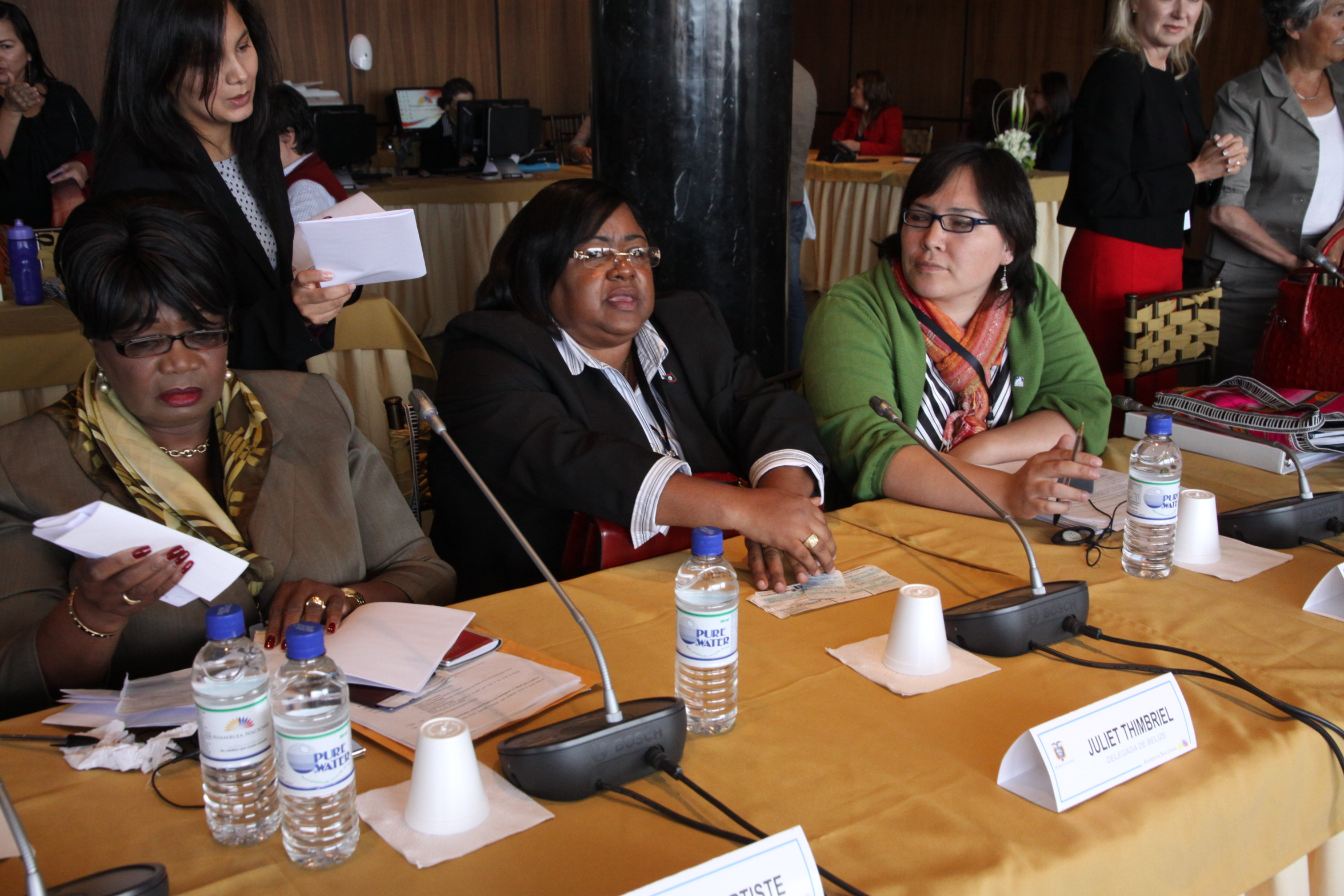
Thimriel and Aluki Kotierk at a meeting of women in power in 2010 in Quito.

in August 2008, Thimbriel made headlines when she quarreled with the mayor of Belize City, Zenaida Moya. She had been interviewing City Administrator Englebert Perera and he was not supporting his boss. His boss, Zenaida Moya, phoned in afterwards. Thimbriel was not one of Moya's supporters and she showed it. After the call was complete she was heard to say "But da weh she di call in ya fa?".

Dean Barrow contacted her later to speak about her disrespect of Zenaida Moya. Thimbriel resigned her position as a senator and was suspended from the radio station for two weeks.

In 2010 Thimbriel was in Quito in Ecuador at that country's National Assembly building. She was at a meeting of Women Parliamentarians of the Americas to discuss "Women in Power - Challenges for the 21st Century". In 2015 she was vice-president of the senate.

Thimgriel had another public argument in August 2021 after she was removed as the chair of one of her party's committees in 2021. She had a falling out with the party's leader Patrick Faber.
