= Piita Irniq =

Canadian Inuk politician and commissioner (born 1947)

Piita Taqtu Irniq

2nd Commissioner of Nunavut
- In office April 1, 2000 – April 21, 2005
- Prime Minister: Jean Chrétien; Paul Martin
- Premier: Paul Okalik
- Preceded by: Helen Maksagak
- Succeeded by: Ann Meekitjuk Hanson

MLA for Keewatin
- In office March 10, 1975 – October 1, 1979
- Preceded by: first member
- Succeeded by: district abolished

MLA for Aivilik
- In office October 5, 1987 – October 15, 1991
- Preceded by: Tagak Curley
- Succeeded by: James Arvaluk

Personal details
- Born: February 1, 1947 (age 79) Lyon Inlet near Repulse Bay, Northwest Territories, Canada
- Occupation: Cultural teacher
- Profession: Politician

Piita Taqtu Irniq, formerly Peter Irniq and Peter Ernerk, (born February 1, 1947) is an Inuk politician in Canada, who served as the second commissioner of Nunavut from April 2000 to April 2005. He is an Inuit cultural teacher and has lived most of his life in the Kivalliq Region of Nunavut, including Naujaat, Coral Harbour, Baker Lake, Chesterfield Inlet, Rankin Inlet, and Iqaluit. He has also lived in the Western Arctic (Northwest Territories), Manitoba and Ontario.

== Biography ==
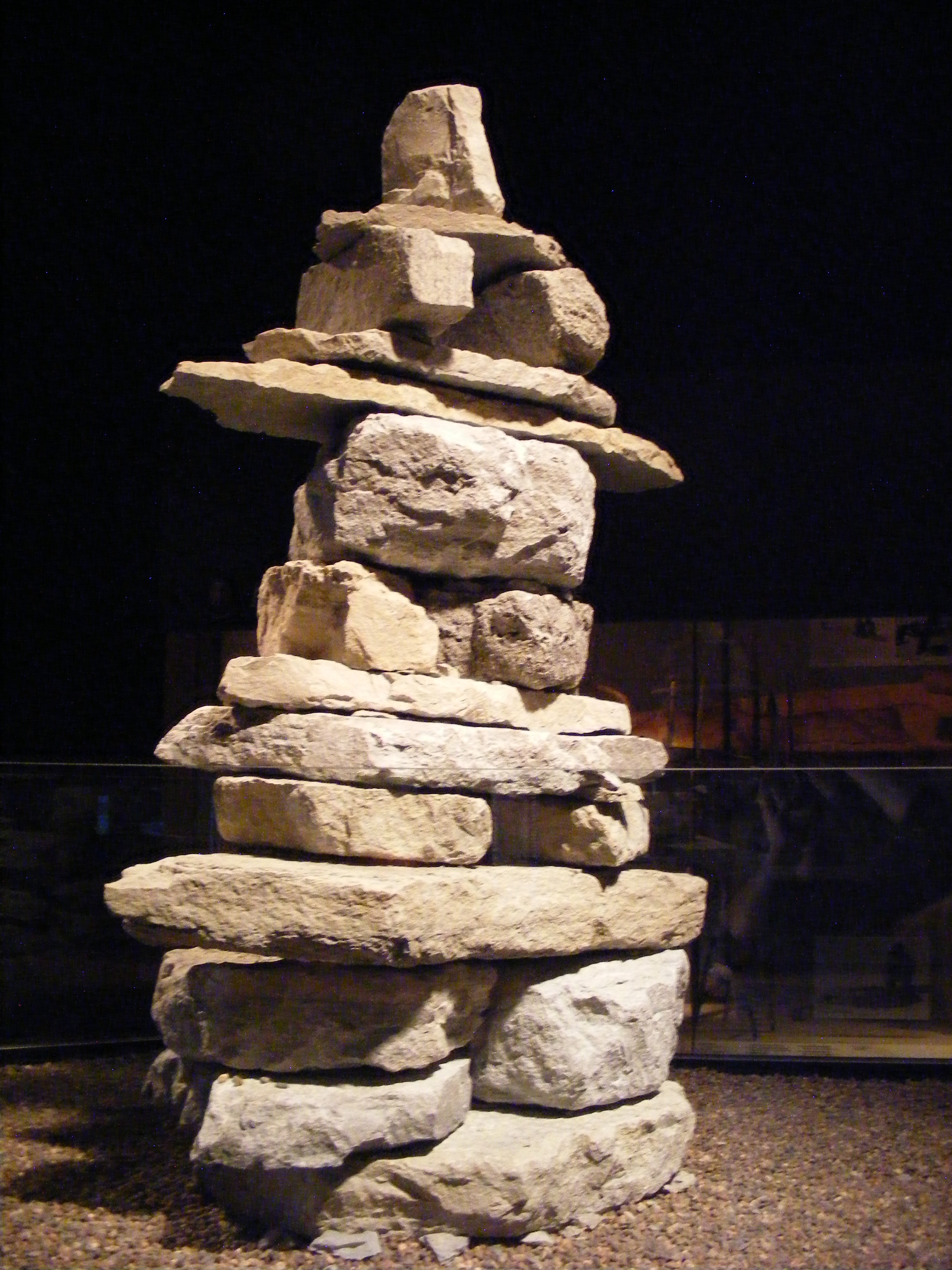
Inuksuk erected by Piita Irniq for the permanent exhibition The Ancient Americas of The Field Museum

Irniq was born in Lyon Inlet near Repulse Bay, Northwest Territories (now Naujaat, Nunavut). In 1958, he was forced to attend Indian Residential School in Chesterfield Inlet. Later on, he attended the Sir John Franklin School in Yellowknife from 1963 to 1964.

Irniq was the executive assistant to the assistant commissioner of the NWT. from 1974 to 1975. He was elected to the 1975 Northwest Territories general election and represented the riding of the Keewatin for four years. He was the first Inuk to be made assistant regional director for the Department of the Executive in the former Keewatin Region (Kivalliq Region), 1979 until 1981.

As superintendent of renewable resources, he was the first Inuk to hold this position and encouraged the hiring of Inuit into the department. In 1982, Irniq was appointed the first Speaker of the Keewatin Council, a position he held until 1983. Elected president of the Keewatin Inuit Association, he served in this capacity for five years.

Irniq was re-elected to the Northwest Territories Legislature in the 1987 general election for the Aivilik electoral district. He ran on a platform of encouraging Inuit to participate at higher levels in employment, education, and business. He ran again in the 1991 general election; however, James Arvaluk defeated him.

He was named the executive director of the Inuit Cultural Institute in 1992. A year later, he became director of communications for Nunavut Tunngavik Incorporated.

As a member of the Nunavut Implementation Commission, Irniq served on the Communication and Governmental Operations Committees and was a spokesperson for the Commission on Nunavut in Canada and overseas and was active in seeking justice for the former students of the infamous Joseph Bernier residential school in Chesterfield Inlet, who suffered physical and sexual abuse at the hands of school staff.

Irniq was assistant director, Nunavut, Heritage/Culture, Department of Education, Culture and Employment for the Government of N.W.T. where he was responsible for developing culture and heritage programs and services to meet the needs of the new territory of Nunavut, 1997–98. He became deputy minister of Culture, Language, Elders and Youth, 1998–99. His mandate was to be the guardian of traditional Inuit culture and language.

In August 1999, Irniq was seconded to the Legislative Assembly of Nunavut to set up the offices of the Official Languages, Access to Information and Conflict of Interest Commissioners.

In addition, Irniq writes an Inuit perspective column for the Nunavut News/North newspaper.

In 2003, he was made a Commander of the Order of St. John. In 2005, he was appointed to the board of directors of the Canadian Race Relations Foundation. Most recently, he served as a key consultant on the National Film Board of Canada project Unikkausivut: Sharing Our Stories.

He won an Indspire Award for Culture, Heritage, and Spirituality in 2015.

== Arms ==
Coat of arms of Piita Irniq
Notes The arms of Piita Irniq, presented on a roundel rather than the escutcheon shape traditional in European heraldry, consist of: Crest A demi Inuk man holding a drum and beater proper. Escutcheon Azure an inuksuk, in dexter chief an Inuit drum and beater in saltire Or. Supporters Dexter a muskox standing on a snow bank, sinister a ringed seal proper issuant from barry wavy Azure and Argent. Motto "Let us move forward”, is stated in Inuinnaqtun and Inuktitut

== See also ==
- Notable Aboriginal people of Canada

Legislative Assembly of the Northwest Territories
Preceded by New District	MLA Keewatin; 1975-1979	Succeeded by District Abolished
Preceded by Tagak Curley	MLA Aivilik; 1987-1991	Succeeded by James Arvaluk
Political offices
Preceded by Helen Maksagak	Commissioner of Nunavut; 2000-2005	Succeeded by Ann Meekitjuk Hanson
