= Rymer Point =

Cape in the Canadian Arctic territory of Nunavut

- Location within Nunavut Location within Canada

Geography
- Location: Wollaston Peninsula, Victoria Island
- Coordinates: 69°02′N 113°37′W
- Archipelago: Arctic Archipelago

Administration
- Canada
- Territory: Nunavut
- Region: Kitikmeot

Demographics
- Population: Uninhabited

Rymer Point is a cape in the Canadian Arctic territory of Nunavut. It is located on southwestern Victoria Island's Wollaston Peninsula, facing the Dolphin and Union Strait. Clouston Bay (69°03′N 113°33′W) is situated along the north shoreline. Nuvuk Point (69°01′45″N 113°37′00″W) is on the southwest side, jutting into Simpson Bay (69°05′N 114°20′W).

== Geography ==
The low cliffs of Rymer Point are characterized by carbonate rock.

== History ==
Various trading posts operated at Rymer Point, including one by the Hudson's Bay Company, named Fort Harmon, and another by the Christian Klengenberg family.
