= Nellie Kusugak =

Canadian educator and regional commissioner

The Honourable Nellie Kusugak ONu
- Kusugak in 2016

5th Commissioner of Nunavut
- In office 23 June 2015 – 22 June 2020
- Prime Minister: Stephen Harper; Justin Trudeau
- Premier: Peter Taptuna; Paul Quassa; Joe Savikataaq
- Preceded by: Edna Elias
- Succeeded by: Rebekah Williams (acting)
- Acting; 11 April 2010 – 31 May 2010
- Prime Minister: Stephen Harper
- Premier: Eva Aariak
- Preceded by: Ann Meekitjuk Hanson
- Succeeded by: Edna Elias

Deputy Commissioner of Nunavut
- In office 15 February 2010 – 23 June 2015
- Prime Minister: Stephen Harper
- Premier: Eva Aariak; Peter Taptuna
- Preceded by: Helen Maksagak

Personal details
- Born: Nellie Taptaqut Kusugak; 1955 (age 70–71) Rankin Inlet, Northwest Territories (now Nunavut), Canada
- Spouse: Jose Kusugak
- Occupation: educator
- Profession: politician

Nellie Taptaqut Kusugak ONu (born 1955) is a Canadian educator who served as the fifth commissioner of Nunavut from June 2015 to June 2020.

== Early life ==
Kusugak is from Rankin Inlet. Kusugak received a BEd in 1996 through the Nunavut Teachers Education Program provided by Nunavut Arctic College (NAC) and McGill University, where she is listed as an adjunct professor. She has been a teacher for about 20 years in both Inuktitut and English. Prior to her appointment as deputy commissioner, she was an adult educator at NAC in Rankin Inlet.

== Political career ==
Kusugak served as Deputy Commissioner of Nunavut from 2010 to 2015. She was appointed by Minister of Indian Affairs and Northern Development, Chuck Strahl, on 15 February 2010 and was sworn in on 25 February. On 11 April 2010, Kusugak became the acting Commissioner of Nunavut with the expiry of Ann Meekitjuk Hanson's term and served until the appointment of Edna Elias a month later. As the territorial head of state, Kusugak represented all Nunavut citizens. While in office, she gave Assent to bills passed by the legislative assembly, swore in cabinet ministers, and signed off on documents, among other official duties.

== Personal life ==
Kusugak was married to former Nunavut Tunngavik Incorporated president, Jose Kusugak.

== Honours and Arms ==
- Member of the Order of Nunavut
- Louie Kamookak Medal, Royal Canadian Geographical Society

Coat of arms of Nellie Kusugak

Crest
A flower Gules seeded of a woman’s face proper all within a timber frame Or.
Escutcheon
Per pale Azure and Gules an inuksuk between three ulus Or and in chief a snow knife fesswise Argent hilted Or.
Supporters
Two snow buntings each gorged of a collar of Inuit beadwork proper pendent therefrom a maple leaf conjoined in base with an ulu Or, both standing on a base of snow set with two qulliqs and purple saxifrage flowers all flanked by waves proper and issuant from a bar of an Inuit tattoo pattern Sable.
Motto
ᓇᒡᓕᖕᓂᖅ ᐃᓚᒌᑦᓯᐊᕐᓂᖅ ᓴᐱᓕᔪᐃᑦᑑᓂᖅ;
