= VPW-FM =

Radio station in Belize City, owned by the United Democratic Party

WAVE Radio (VPW-FM)
- Belize City; Belize
- Broadcast area: National
- Frequency: 105.9/99.9 MHz
- Branding: "WAVE 105.9 FM"

Programming
- Format: Urban AC

Ownership
- Owner: United Democratic Party

History
- First air date: 14 December 1998; 27 years ago

Technical information
- ERP: 105,900 watts

Links
- Website: WAVE on Belizeweb; WAVE website

For other radio stations which may use "Wave" as a brand name, see Wave (disambiguation).

WAVE Radio (call-sign VPW-FM), a Belize City radio station operating since 1998, is the radio arm of the United Democratic Party (UDP). It is located at the corner of Ebony Street and the Belchina Bridge entrance, at the UDP Headquarters.

== History ==
WAVE Radio was formed on 14 December 1998 as an indirect result of the dismantling of the former Broadcasting Corporation of Belize. WAVE was located on Fabers' Road on Southside Belize City and headed by veteran radio journalist Brian Mossiah. Other veterans joining the staff included Ed Yorke (now deceased), Adrian Harris and Kenny Morgan, with popular youth announcer Olden Young joining the staff two months later. Ironically, the station's opening was reported for News 5 by Hyacinth Latchman, who currently works at WAVE as an announcer. Mossiah denied reports that the UDP had financed the establishment of WAVE, but those reports gained some steam following an incident on 13 May 1999.

=== 1999 Michael Rudon false accusations ===
WAVE's Young reported on 13 May that then editor of the Belize Times, Michael Rudon, was under lockdown for allegedly molesting a primary school student. Channel 5 and other media houses had been fed the same story, but it was later proven false. After checking with the police to confirm the story, WAVE claimed, they had gone ahead, believing in the accuracy of the report. Rudon called over to complain and WAVE's contact retracted the story, saying there had been a mistake in the police files. WAVE retracted onair and Channel 5 laid the blame at the door of then Senator, attorney, and editor of the Guardian, Audrey Matura, who had apparently been wronged by the Times editorial staff, though Matura denied it.

=== Takeover by the UDP and transition ===
Entering the 2000s, WAVE Radio faced several changes in staff. Mossiah, Harris, and Yorke all left for Love FM and FM 2000 respectively, with Mossiah being named Government Press Officer in 2002. It is presumed that by this time the Opposition UDP moved WAVE to its headquarters on the Belchina Bridge. WAVE was now in transition as new stars emerged, led by Juliet Thimbriel, who became WAVE's general manager. The station lost the popular Olden Young to suicide in 2003. He was replaced by new stars as Hyacinth Latchman, Dale Anthony McDougal, Alfrain "Mr. Hype" Supaul and David "International DJ" Busch.

== Primary signals ==
- 105.9 FM (Belize City)
- 99.9 FM (elsewhere)

== Other station taglines ==
- Ride the WAVE...Don't Bother with the Ripples!
- Entertainment with an Attitude, Reaching High Altitudes!
- The Baby of the Bunch...with the knockout punch! (refers to relative newness among radio counterparts)
- New Age Radio!

== Personalities of WAVE Radio ==
- Juliet Thimbriel: General Manager, host of "Fus' Ting Da Mawnin"
- Joe Bradley: co-host, "Fus' Ting Da Mawnin"
- Hyacinth Latchman: City Councillor, host "Millennium Woman"
- Kenny Morgan: DJ and activist, host "Light Chop to Choppy"
- Alfrain Supaul: DJ, host "Drivetime Splash"
- Dale McDougal: newsreader and technical director
- Paula Ack: news editor and Spanish-language newsreader

=== Guest Personalities ===
- Michael Finnegan: Mesopotamia Area Representative, host "Mek Wave and Lik Road"
- Delroy Cuthkelvin: UDP strategist, host "Moment of Truth" (Sundays)
- Dymatics Sound Crew: DJ Dixxie, DJ Shine, DJ Dre, DJ Juice. Hosts Of "Sound The Big Thing"(Saturdays)
- Frank "A-3" Magdaleno: DJ, Radio Announcer and talk show Host.
- DJ Premier: DJ
- Remix Berto: DJ and Radio Announcer. Host of "Flaming Friday"
- Capt Nicolas Sanchez
