= Edna Elias =

Canadian politician

4th Commissioner of Nunavut
- In office 12 May 2010 – 11 May 2015
- Prime Minister: Stephen Harper
- Premier: Eva Aariak; Peter Taptuna
- Preceded by: Nellie Kusugak (acting)
- Succeeded by: Nellie Kusugak

Personal details
- Born: 1954 or 1955 (age 70–71) Coppermine, Northwest Territories (now Kugluktuk, Nunavut)
- Relations: Christian Klengenberg (great grandfather)

Edna Agnes Ekhivalak Elias CM ONu (born c. 1955) is a Canadian politician from Kugluktuk, Nunavut. On 12 May 2010 she was appointed as the fourth commissioner of Nunavut by Prime Minister Stephen Harper. Her term ended on 11 May 2015.

Elias, who was in 2009 appointed to Inuit Uqausinnginnik Taiguusiliuqtiit (the Inuit Language Authority), has also served as the mayor of Kugluktuk and principal of Jimmy Hikok Ilihakvik (primary school), as well as teaching in Arctic Bay and working as an executive assistant for Nunavut Tunngavik Incorporated in Cambridge Bay. Prior to division of the Northwest Territories in 1999 she was the head of the Department of Culture and Employment's language bureau. Elias, who is fluent in Inuinnaqtun, has stated that her goal as commissioner will be to promote education and the Inuit languages.

In December 2011, it was announced that Elias, along with Elisabeth Hadlari, Donna Olsen-Hakongak, Crystal Qaumariaq, Jeannie Ehaloak, all of Cambridge Bay, and Jamie McInnis of Calgary would try to raise $70,000 for the Alberta Cancer Foundation to help support breast cancer research and the Cross Cancer Institute in Edmonton. To raise the money the six women planned to walk across the Coronation Gulf from Umingmaktok to Cambridge Bay, approximately 250 km (160 mi), in May 2012. The group hoped to walk between 40–48 km (25–30 mi) a day and taking 5 to 6 days to reach Cambridge Bay in time for the Frolics which are held over the Victoria Day weekend. Average temperatures in Cambridge Bay during May are −9.3 °C (15.3 °F).

Elias was made a Member of the Order of Canada in 2019. She was made a Member of the Order of Nunavut in 2010 by virtue of her office as Commissioner of Nunavut.

Elias is the great-granddaughter of Danish whaler, trapper, and trader, Christian Klengenberg.
