= Helen Maksagak =

Canadian territorial commissioner (1931–2009)

Helen Maksagak CM

1st Commissioner of Nunavut
- In office April 1, 1999 – April 1, 2000
- Prime Minister: Jean Chrétien
- Premier: Paul Okalik
- Succeeded by: Peter Irniq

Commissioner of the Northwest Territories
- In office January 16, 1995 – March 26, 1999
- Prime Minister: Jean Chrétien
- Premier: Nellie J. Cournoyea; Don Morin; Jim Antoine
- Preceded by: Daniel L. Norris
- Succeeded by: Daniel Joseph Marion

Personal details
- Born: April 15, 1931 Bernard Harbour, Northwest Territories (now Nunavut)
- Died: January 23, 2009 (aged 77) Cambridge Bay, Nunavut

Helen Mamayaok Maksagak, CM (April 15, 1931 – January 23, 2009) was a Canadian supporter of Indigenous rights and territorial commissioner. She served as the commissioner of the Northwest Territories from January 16, 1995, until March 26, 1999, and as the first commissioner of Nunavut from April 1, 1999, until April 1, 2000. She is a notable Copper Inuk. Born on the land near Bernard Harbour in the Canadian Western Arctic, Maksagak was raised in Tuktoyaktuk, Aklavik and the Bathurst Inlet area and eventually settled in Cambridge Bay to raise a family of six surviving children with her husband, John Maksagak Sr. Together, they were stalwart supporters of the growing Indigenous rights movement in the Canadian north. Their home was often a stopping place and site of discussions when young Inuit involved in negotiating the Nunavut Land Claims Agreement or participating in Northwest Territories political life passed through the community.

Maksagak was appointed Deputy Commissioner of the Northwest Territories in 1992. In 1995, she was appointed Commissioner, partially in anticipation of the pending creation of the territory of Nunavut in 1999. She was the first woman and the first Inuk to hold the office. In April 1999, she transferred her office to the new Nunavut Territory and continued to provide stability to the new government in transition. She served until April 2000 as the first commissioner of the newly created territory of Nunavut and then as Assistant Commissioner of Nunavut from 2005 until she died in 2009.

Helen Maksagak was appointed as a member of the Order of Canada in May 2003. She served as a member of the Qulliit (Nunavut) Status of Women Council and as an Elder for the Aboriginal Healing Foundation.

Maksagak died on January 23, 2009, at 77. Helen Maksagak Drive in Iqaluit is named in her memory.

== Arms ==
Coat of arms of Helen Maksagak

Notes
Granted 4 June 1996.
Crest
A demi Inuk woman wearing an atigi styled in the manner of the Inuvialuit people Proper her dexter hand resting on an Inuit ulu Or.
Escutcheon
Purpure an Inukshuk of six stones Or.
Supporters
On a bank of snow Argent above barry wavy of three Azure Argent and Azure dexter a caribou Or gorged with a collar of mountain avens Proper sinister an arctic wolf Or gorged with a like collar.
Motto
Apkutikson Nalunaikniagiga (I Will Show The Way)

Preceded by Ann Meekitjuk Hanson	Deputy Commissioner of the Northwest Territories; 1992–1994	Succeeded by Daniel Joseph Marion
Preceded by Daniel L. Norris	Commissioner of the Northwest Territories; 1995–1999	Succeeded by Daniel Joseph Marion
Preceded by New position	Commissioner of Nunavut; 1999–2000	Succeeded by Peter Irniq
Preceded by New position	Deputy Commissioner of Nunavut; 2005–2009	Succeeded by Nellie Kusugak
