= Michael Amarook =

Canadian Inuk artist (1941–1998)

- Born: 1941
- Died: 1998 (aged 56–57)

Michael Amarook (1941–1998) was an Inuk Canadian artist, sculptor, and Inuit activist who served as President of the Inuit Tapiriit Kanatami (ITK) from 1977 to 1978 and from 1979 to 1981.

His artwork has been included in the collections of the Canadian Museum of History, the Musée des beaux-arts de Montréal, the Prince of Wales Northern Heritage Centre, and the Winnipeg Art Gallery. He also worked as a printmaking director for Sanavik, as well as serving as one of its first directors.

While President of the ITK its delegates voted unanimously to pass a resolution calling for the creation of Nunavut.

Amarook was from Baker Lake (Qamani'tuaq).
