= Pauktuutit =

- Formation: 1984
- Type: National Aboriginal Organization
- Legal status: active
- Purpose: advocate and public voice, educator and network for Inuit women
- Headquarters: Ottawa, Ontario, Canada
- Region served: Canada
- Official language: English, Inuktitut (syllabics)
- Website: www.pauktuutit.ca

Pauktuutit is an organization in Canada that represents Inuit women. It was officially started in 1984 and is headquartered in Ottawa for easier access to the Parliament of Canada. Every Canadian Inuk woman is considered to be a member of Pauktuutit. Thus, no woman needs to pay for membership.

The organization is meant to promote social equality for Inuit women, children's rights, and the improvement of living conditions for Inuit women. It also strives to obtain a larger role for Inuit women in Canadian politics, to preserve Inuit culture, and to encourage personal independence among Inuit women. To these ends, Pauktuutit has spoken out against sexual abuse of children and physical abuse of women, and has been concerned with housing.

Similar organizations include the Inuit Tapiriit Kanatami, which represents all Inuit Canadians; there is also the Native Women's Association of Canada, which represents Aboriginal women, recognized by Pauktuutit as an ally. However, scholars have noted the Native Women's Association of Canada has enjoyed more representation in meetings of Canadian leaders than Pauktuutit.

== History ==
Throughout the 1970s, Inuit activists and organizers placed great focus on territorial autonomy and land rights issues. While organizations like Inuit Tapiriit Kanatami (ITK, formerly the Eskimo Brotherhood of Canada) started to bring greater attention to preservation of Inuit culture and Indigenous rights, Inuit women felt that their daily struggles and issues which most directly impacted them were largely ignored in organizing efforts. In a 1975 meeting in Nunavut, ITK members discussed the idea of creating an Inuit women's organization.

It was not until 1981 that the organization received full support during the ITC Annual General Meeting (AGM). During this event, participants brought up major public health and social issues prevalent in Northern communities which primarily impacted Inuit women. In traditional Inuit culture, women are caregivers and keepers of traditional knowledge (Qaujimajatuqangit in Inuit), values, and other dimensions of Inuit history and identity. This meant much of the burden of socioeconomic, health, and other local challenges fell on women's shoulders. This context led to the establishment of a national organization to represent and advocate for Inuit women, Pauktuutit.

Pauktuutit Inuit Women's Association held its inaugural meeting in March of 1983, in Iqaluit. The original board held fourteen elected members, with a central office location in Ottawa, in order to be closer to the Canadian government offices to better promote Inuit issues. Pauktuutit became a not-for-profit organization in April of 1984, and held its first AGM in January 1985, with almost 150 women participants representing each of the 53 communities throughout Nunatsiavut.

Since its inception, Pauktuutit has continued to organize around issues in violence and abuse prevention, justice, health, LGBTQA+ rights, and socioeconomic development as they impact Inuit women throughout Canada. In 2020, Pauktuutit members developed The National Action Plan, a demand to end violence against Indigenous women and response to the Final Report on the National Inquiry into Missing and Murdered Indigenous Women and Girls.

Their 2022 resolutions include implementing the United Nations Declaration on the Rights of Indigenous People (UNDRIP), providing shelters and transitional housing for Inuit women, LGBTQQIA+ people and their children, bringing midwifery back to Inuit Nunangat, empowerment and leadership opportunities for Inuit women, federal pathway and Inuit action plan implementation, and review of historical resolutions turned into declarations.

== Organizational Strategies & Advocacy Work ==
Pauktuutit is primarily focused on advocacy and awareness work. Annual meetings serve as spaces for Inuit women members to network and connect across Nunangat. Organization news, annual resolutions, and other organizational updates are circulated through the group's newsletter, Suliqpita. The organization also publishes mutual aid and community awareness resources on relevant issues affecting Inuit women, such as domestic and family violence, residential schools, housing resources, public health materials, substance abuse support resources, and other community needs prevalent in Northern communities.

Pauktuutit also has a subgroup called the Women's Business Network, intended to support Inuit women in the workforce and provide advice and resources for starting small businesses and becoming self-employed.

The organization is heavily involved in political activism and advocacy work focused on better legislation for Inuit women. Pauktuutit members have collaborated with the Canadian government in policy-making, and partners with Inuit and other Indigenous organizations like ITK, the Royal Commission on Aboriginal Peoples, and the Missing and Murdered Indigenous Women and Girls movement.
