= Rebekah Williams =

Canadian politician (1950–2023)

Rebekah Uqi Williams

Acting Commissioner of Nunavut
- In office June 22, 2020 – January 12, 2021
- Prime Minister: Justin Trudeau
- Premier: Joe Savikataaq
- Preceded by: Nellie Kusugak
- Succeeded by: Eva Aariak

MLA for Quttiktuq
- In office 2000–2004
- Preceded by: Levi Barnabas
- Succeeded by: Levi Barnabas

Personal details
- Born: March 3, 1950 Arctic Bay, Northwest Territories (now Nunavut)
- Died: April 15, 2023 (aged 73)
- Party: Non-partisan consensus government

Rebekah Uqi Williams (March 3, 1950 – April 15, 2023) was a Canadian politician who served as the acting commissioner of Nunavut from June 22, 2020, when Nellie Kusugak's term ended, until January 14, 2021, when Eva Aariak took office. She served as the Deputy Commissioner of Nunavut from December 20, 2019 until December 2022. She also served as a former territorial level politician from Arctic Bay, Northwest Territories, now part of Nunavut. Williams previously served as a member of the Legislative Assembly of Nunavut from 2000 until 2004.

Williams was elected in a by-election in the Quttiktuq electoral district on December 4, 2000. She defeated seven other candidates with 21% of the vote including former MLA Levi Barnabas who had previously vacated the seat after he pleaded guilty to assault as well as former Northwest Territories MLA Tommy Enuaraq.

Williams served a partial term in office, and ran for re-election in the 2004 Nunavut general election. Despite increasing her popular vote she was defeated by Barnabas.
