= John Amagoalik =

Canadian politician

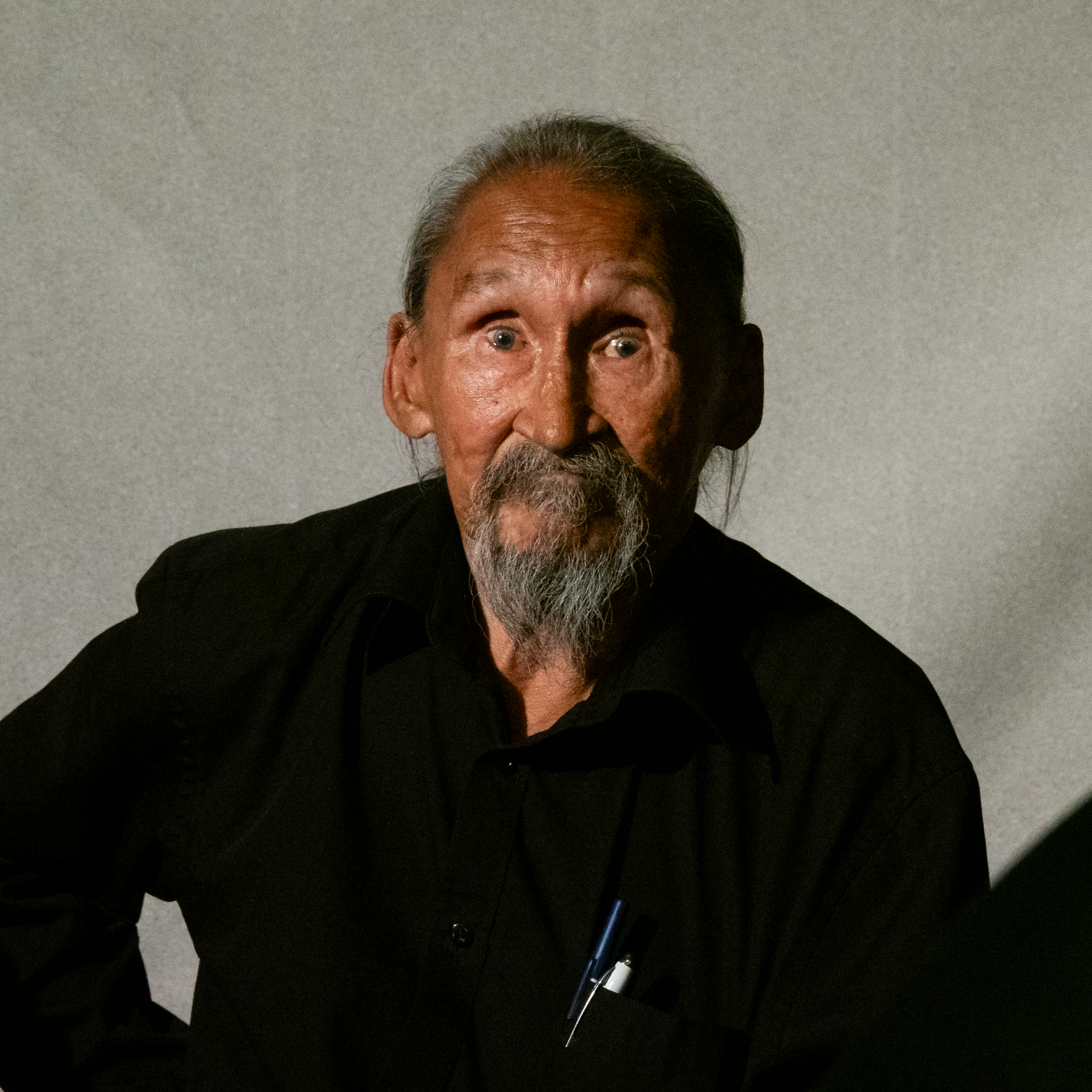
- John Amagoalik at Pond Inlet, NU, 2017

Chairman of the Nunavut Implementation Commission
- In office 1993–1999

President of the Inuit Tapiriit Kanatami
- In office 1981 – 1985, again from 1988-1991
- Preceded by: Micheal Amarook
- Succeeded by: Rhoda Inukshuk

Executive director of Nunavut Land Claims Project
- In office 1974–1975

Baffin Regional Information Officer
- In office 1971–1974

Personal details
- Born: November 26, 1947 (age 78) Nunavik, Quebec

John Amagoalik OC ONu (born November 26, 1947) is an Inuk politician from Nunavik (Québec). He campaigned for Inuit rights and made a significant contribution to the founding of the Canadian territory of Nunavut. He was Chairman of the Nunavut Implementation Commission and is widely regarded as the "Father of Nunavut".

== Early life and education ==
Amagoalik was born on November 26, 1947, near Inukjuaq in Nunavik in northern Québec. In 1953, his family was relocated to Resolute Bay by the Canadian Government and he was educated in residential schools in Resolute Bay, Churchill and Iqaluit. However, Amagoalik stopped his formal education after grade 9 to support his father who had fallen ill with tuberculosis. His families living conditions after their forced relocation to Resolute was poor, with no vegetation or fish. Years later, Amagoalik and other relocated Inuit identifying themselves as "High Arctic exiles" petitioned for Prime Minister of Canada Stephen Harper to apologize for the relocation.

== Career ==
Amagoalik began his political career as the Baffin Regional Information Officer with the Northwest Territories territorial government from 1971 to 1974. In 1974, Amagoalik was appointed executive director of Nunavut Land Claims Project to claim Inuit land. The following year, he succeeded Tagak Curley as director of Land Claims for the Inuit Tapiriit Kanatami.

Amagoalik served two terms as President of the Inuit Tapiriit Kanatami before becoming a political adviser to the Tungavik Federation of Nunavut. He was also a member of the Executive Council of the Inuit Circumpolar Conference from 1980 to 1983.

After the ratification of the Nunavut Land Claims Agreement Act and Nunavut Act in 1993, Amagoalik led the land-claims settlement process with Nunavut Tunngavik Incorporated. From 1993 to 1999, Amagoalik served as chair of the Nunavut Implementation Commission, which was a 10-member body that designed Nunavut's public government. He recommended that Nunavut elect a "public government with democratically elected Legislative Assembly [which] will respect individual and collective rights as defined in the Canadian Charter of Rights and Freedoms." He was given the nickname "Father of Nunavut" for his efforts in founding the Canadian territory of Nunavut.

In 2014, Amagoalik was honoured with the Order of Nunavut. He later received the Order of Canada in 2019 for his “leadership in Canada’s North, notably for his integral role in the creation of Nunavut.”

In June 2026, after 16 months living in Embassy West Senior Living care facility in Ottawa following a surgery that resulted in the partial amputation of his right leg, he returned to Nunavut using funds raised by supporters. In September 2026, Amagoalik filed a lawsuit against the government of Nunavut for their refusal to pay for his care.
