= Nunavut Implementation Commission =

The Nunavut Implementation Commission was a federally appointed body of nine political figures and community leaders appointed from across Northwest Territories, Canada to establish and implement policy towards the division of Northwest Territories and the creation of Nunavut.

The commission was in operation from 1993 to 1999 and included Meeka Kilabuk, David Alagalak, John Amagoalik, Clara O'Gorman, Mary Simon, Bill Lyall and Peter Irniq.
