= Ann Meekitjuk Hanson =

Canadian Inuk territorial commissioner (born 1946)

Ann Meekitjuk Hanson ONu

3rd Commissioner of Nunavut
- In office April 21, 2005 – April 10, 2010
- Prime Minister: Paul Martin; Stephen Harper
- Premier: Paul Okalik; Eva Aariak
- Preceded by: Peter Irniq
- Succeeded by: Nellie Kusugak (acting)

Personal details
- Born: May 22, 1946 (age 80) Qakutut, Northwest Territories
- Spouse: Robert Hanson
- Occupation: Civil servant, broadcaster, journalist and author

Ann Meekitjuk Hanson ONu (Inuktitut: ᐋᓐ ᒦᖀᑦᔩᒃ ᐦᐋᓐᓱᓐ, romanized: An Miiqitjuk Hansun; born May 22, 1946) is a Canadian Inuk community worker who was the third commissioner of Nunavut from 2005 to 2010.

== Early life ==
Hanson was born in Qakutut, Northwest Territories (now Nunavut). Like all Inuit born between the 1940s and the 1970s, she was labelled with a disc number by the Government of Canada, which, in her case was E7-121. She spent the first 11 years of her life speaking only Inuktitut and living in Qakutut and Kimmirut. She attended schools in Iqaluit, Baker Lake (Qamanituaq), and Toronto, where she was known as Annie Cotterill. She studied community development at Saint Francis Xavier University, geography at the University of Windsor and received a diploma with honors in journalism from Nunavut Arctic College.

== Career ==
Hanson's career has been diverse. She has been a civil servant, broadcaster, journalist and author. She has used her skills in Inuktitut throughout her career. Joining the federal government in 1964, she served as a secretary and interpreter/translator in the office of Northwest Territories MP Eugène Rhéaume.

Hanson appeared, credited under a pseudonym "Pilitak", as the character Neevee in the 1974 film The White Dawn, which featured many Inuit actors speaking Inuktitut. She later said that the experience for the Frobisher Bay (now Iqaluit) community was "a renaissance back to our language".

She joined the Canadian Broadcasting Corporation as a receptionist, later becoming an announcer and producer in Inuktitut broadcasting. Hanson was the first editor of the Iqaluit community newspaper Inukshuk, which later became Nunatsiaq News. She is the author of Show Me: A Young Inuk Learns How To Carve in Canada’s Arctic, a book written in Inuktitut and English.

In addition to her work in journalism, Hanson also served with the government of the Northwest Territories as a community development worker, counsellor and deputy commissioner.

Hanson has spent considerable time as a volunteer, helping to start a number of organizations in Iqaluit. These organizations include the Juvenile Court Committee, the Elders Group, the Inuit Cultural Group, and the Quinuajuaq Society.

== Commissioner of Nunavut ==
Prior to the creation of Nunavut, Hanson served as the Deputy Commissioner of the Northwest Territories from 1987 to 1992.

In 2005, Hanson was appointed Commissioner of Nunavut, the third person to hold the position since Nunavut was established in 1999. She held the position until her term expired in 2010. Pending the appointment of her successor, Deputy Commissioner Nellie Kusugak was the acting Commissioner of Nunavut.

== Personal life ==
Hanson lives in Iqaluit with her husband, Robert Hanson. They have five daughters.

== Honours ==
Hanson's work in community development and the continuation of Inuit heritage was recognized in 2003 when she was appointed a Member of the Order of Canada.

In 2010, the Order of Nunavut was established. As commissioner, Hanson became a member of the Order for life.

Ribbon Bar of Ann Meekitjuk Hanson

| Ribbon | Description | Post-nominal letters |
| | Member of the Order of Canada | CM |
| | Member of the Order of Nunavut | ONu |

== Arms ==
The arms of Ann Meekitjuk Hanson were announced in 2007. They were conceived of by Bruce Patterson and Saguenay Herald, painted by Linda Nicholson, and calligraphed by Shirley Mangione.

Presented on a roundel rather than the escutcheon shape traditional in European heraldry, Hanson's arms consist of:

Coat of arms of Ann Meekitjuk Hanson

Crest
Issuant from five purple saxifrage flowers, a rock ptarmigan wings elevated and addorsed proper.
Escutcheon
Purpure a qulliq Argent enflamed Or.
Supporters
Dexter the figure of Sedna proper vested Or queued Argent, sinister a ring seal proper.
Compartment
Barry wavy Purpure and Argent flanking a mount of tundra proper.
Motto
Co-Operation Enhances Peace (In English and in Inuktitut)

== See also ==
- Notable Aboriginal people of Canada

| Preceded by Peter Irniq | Commissioner of Nunavut; 2005–2010 | Succeeded by Nellie Kusugak (acting) |
