= Eva Aariak =

Canadian Inuk politician

The Honourable Eva Aariak CM ONu
- ᐄᕙ ᐋᕆᐊᒃ
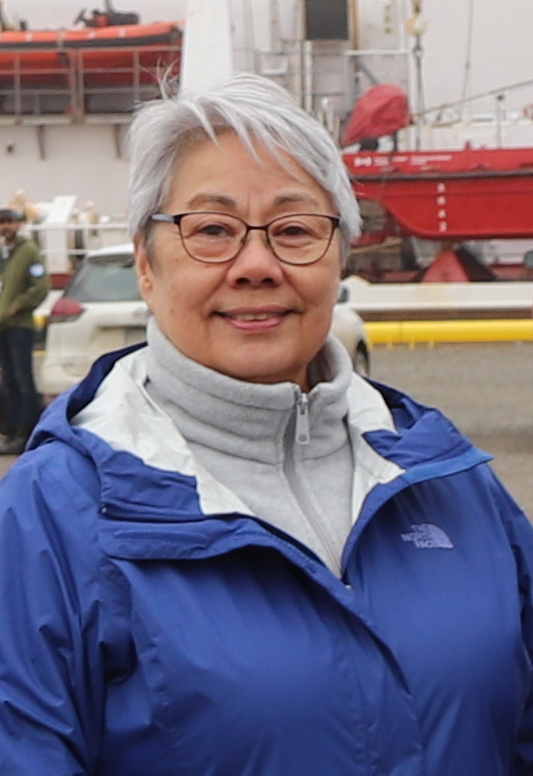
- Aariak in 2023

6th Commissioner of Nunavut
- In office January 14, 2021 – 2026
- Prime Minister: Justin Trudeau; Mark Carney
- Premier: Joe Savikataaq; P. J. Akeeagok; John Main
- Preceded by: Rebekah Williams (acting)
- Succeeded by: Lew Philip (acting)

2nd Premier of Nunavut
- In office November 19, 2008 – November 19, 2013
- Commissioner: Ann Meekitjuk Hanson; Edna Elias
- Preceded by: Paul Okalik
- Succeeded by: Peter Taptuna

Member of the Legislative Assembly of Nunavut
- In office October 27, 2008 – October 28, 2013
- Preceded by: Ed Picco
- Succeeded by: riding redistributed
- Constituency: Iqaluit East

Personal details
- Born: Eva Qamaniq Aarik; January 10, 1955 (age 71) Arctic Bay, Northwest Territories (now Nunavut), Canada
- Party: Independent
- Occupation: CBC reporter, teacher, Languages Commissioner of Nunavut

Eva Qamaniq Aariak (Note: Aariak is occasionally seen as Arreak, which was the original spelling and was due to non-Inuit mishearing the pronunciation of names.) CM ONu (Inuktitut: ᐄᕙ ᐋᕆᐊᒃ, IPA: [iːva aːʁiak]; born January 10, 1955) is a Canadian Inuk politician, who was elected in the 2008 territorial election to represent the electoral district of Iqaluit East in the Legislative Assembly of Nunavut. She was subsequently chosen as the second premier of Nunavut, under the territory's consensus government system, on November 14, 2008. Aariak was the fifth woman to serve as a premier in Canada.

In January 2021, Aariak became the sixth commissioner of Nunavut. She left the role at the end of her term in early 2026.

== Background ==
Prior to her election as an MLA, Aariak was the first Languages Commissioner for Nunavut. Originally appointed to a four-year term beginning in 1999, her term was later extended for another year until December 2004.

In her capacity as Languages Commissioner, she was asked to choose an Inuktitut language word for the Internet; she settled on ikiaqqivik (IPA: [ikiaqqivik]), which literally means "travelling through layers" and refers to the angakkuq, the traditional Inuit concept of a shaman or medicine man, travelling through time and space to find answers to spiritual and material questions.

After stepping down as Languages Commissioner, she then went on to teach Inuktitut at the Pirurvik Centre in Iqaluit, and later owned and operated Malikkaat, a retail store in Iqaluit which sold Inuit arts and crafts. She was later reappointed as acting commissioner in December 2007 after the resignation of then Languages Commissioner, Johnny Kusugak.

She also served as coordinator of the Baffin Divisional Education Council's Inuktitut language book publishing program, as president of the Baffin Regional Chamber of Commerce and as chair of the Nunavut Film Development Corporation.

Her daughter Karliin was named Nunavut's new languages commissioner in 2020.

== Political career ==
Aariak was the only woman elected to the Legislative Assembly in the 2008 election. She subsequently expressed her disappointment with that fact, suggesting that improved daycare services in Nunavut might be needed to help women participate more actively in the political process and that the territory should revisit the failed proposal to have a smaller number of electoral districts, each of which would choose one man and one woman as MLAs.

Two other women, Jeannie Ugyuk and Monica Ell-Kanayuk, were subsequently elected to the legislature in by-elections.

At the Nunavut Leadership Forum on November 14, 2008, Aariak was chosen as the new premier over incumbent Paul Okalik and MLA Tagak Curley. She was the sixth woman, after Rita Johnston, Nellie Cournoyea, Christy Clark, Catherine Callbeck and Pat Duncan, to hold a premiership in Canada, and the sixth female First Minister in the country, including former Prime Minister Kim Campbell.

On September 5, 2013, Aariak announced that while she would seek re-election as an MLA for the new electoral district of Iqaluit-Tasiluk in the 2013 election, she was not interested in the second term as premier when the new Legislative Assembly took office. On October 28, 2013, Aariak was not re-elected as an MLA, losing by 43 votes to George Hickes.

She was appointed a Member of the Order of Canada on November 19, 2018, for her dedication to promoting Inuit culture and languages, as well as her political impacts regarding poverty reduction and the promotion of equity and gender equality.

== Honours and awards ==
Ribbon Bar of Eva Aariak

Ribbon	Description	Post-nominal letters	Notes
	Member of the Order of Canada	CM	
	Member of the Order of Nunavut	ONu	
	Queen Elizabeth II Diamond Jubilee Medal		Canadian version
	King Charles III Coronation Medal		Canadian version
