= Commissioner of Nunavut =

Government representative in Nunavut, Canada

- ᑲᒥᓯᓇ ᓄᓇᕗᒧᑦ; Kamisinauyuq Nunavunmut; Commissaire du Nunavut
- Badge of the Commissioner of Nunavut

- Flag of the Commissioner of Nunavut
- Incumbent; Lew Philip (acting) since 2026
- Style: The Honourable
- Residence: Commissioner's Residence
- Appointer: Governor-in-Council
- Formation: April 1, 1999
- First holder: Helen Maksagak
- Website: commissioner.gov.nu.ca

The commissioner of Nunavut (Inuktitut: ᑲᒥᓯᓇ ᓄᓇᕗᒧᑦ, romanized: Kamisin Nunavumut; Inuinnaqtun: Kamisinauyuq Nunavunmut; French: Commissaire du Nunavut) is the Government of Canada's representative in the territory of Nunavut. The commissioner's position has been vacant since 2026.

The commissioner is appointed to represent the Canadian federal government and performs many of the same duties of lieutenant governors in Canadian provinces, such as swearing in members of the Legislative Assembly of Nunavut and approving territorial legislation. However, unlike a lieutenant governor or the governor general of Canada, the commissioner is not a viceroy and does not represent the Canadian monarch; instead, they represent the federal government.

== History ==
The position was created in 1999 with the creation of the new Nunavut territory. Like other territorial commissioners, the commissioner is appointed by the Government of Canada and represents the Canadian cabinet in the territory.

#	Name	Term	Premiers
1	Helen Maksagak	1999–2000	Paul Okalik
2	Peter Irniq	2000–2005	Paul Okalik
3	Ann Meekitjuk Hanson	2005–2010	Paul Okalik
3	Ann Meekitjuk Hanson	2005–2010	Eva Aariak
–	Nellie Kusugak (acting)	2010	Eva Aariak
4	Edna Elias	2010–2015	Eva Aariak
4	Edna Elias	2010–2015	Peter Taptuna
5	Nellie Kusugak	2015–2020	Peter Taptuna
5	Nellie Kusugak	2015–2020	Paul Quassa
5	Nellie Kusugak	2015–2020	Joe Savikataaq
–	Rebekah Williams (acting)	2020–2021	Joe Savikataaq
6	Eva Aariak	2021–2026	Joe Savikataaq
6	Eva Aariak	2021–2026	P.J. Akeeagok
6	Eva Aariak	2021–2026	John Main
–	Lew Philip (acting)	2026	John Main

Note. Prior to April 1, 1999, Nunavut was part of the Northwest Territories. See Commissioners of Northwest Territories.

=== Deputy commissioner ===
The position of deputy commissioner was created when Nunavut was created in 1999, but it has not always been filled.

Name	Term
Helen Maksagak	2005–2009
Nellie Kusugak	2010–2015
Rebekah Williams	2019–2022
Lew Philip	2024–present

== Duties ==
The duties of the commissioner are similar to that of the lieutenant governors of the provinces. However, since commissioners represent the Government of Canada rather than the Crown, they are not viceroys.
