= Nunavut Tunngavik Incorporated =

Legal representative of the Inuit of Nunavut

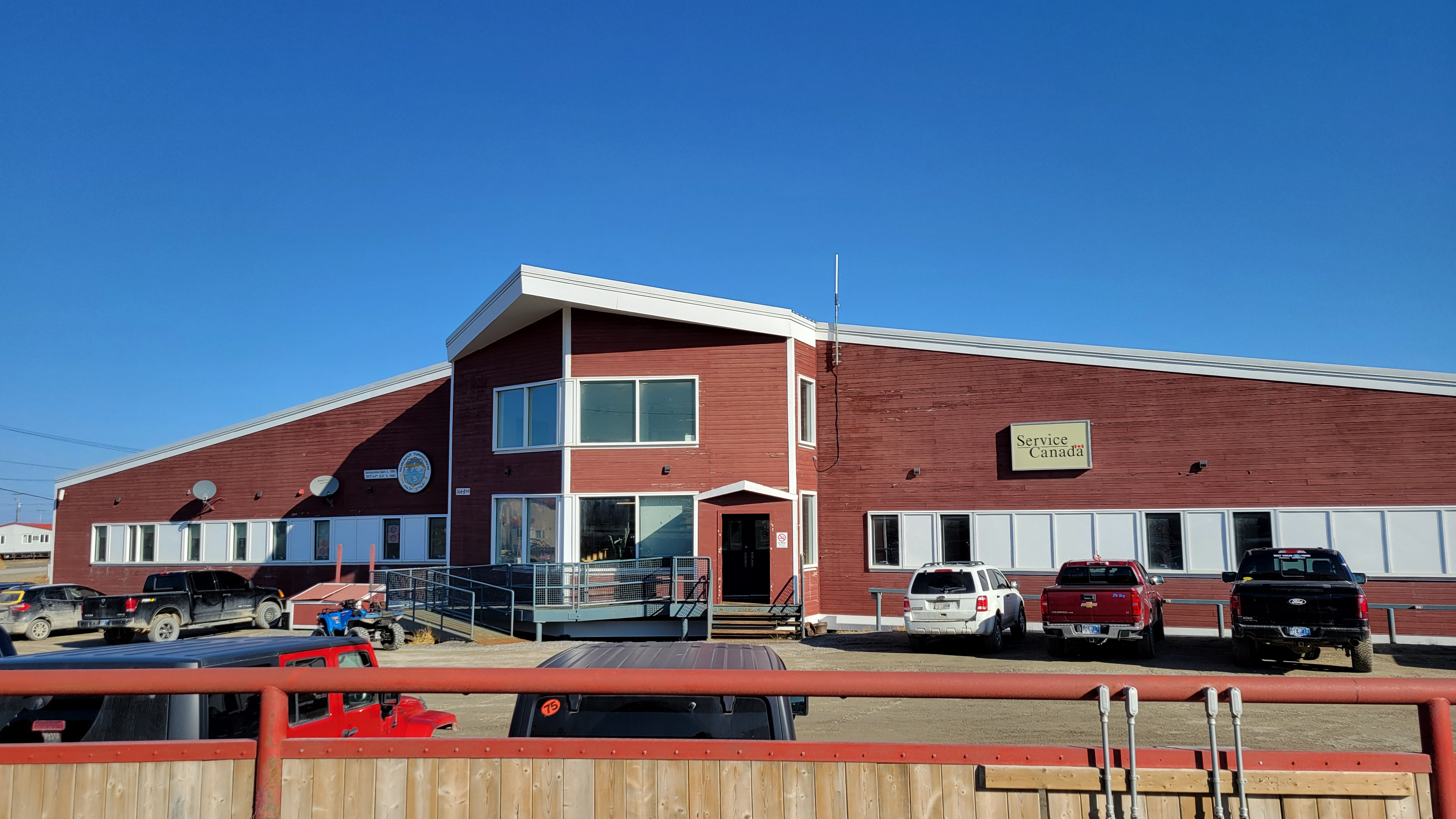
A building which houses Service Canada and Nunavut Tunngavik Incorporated offices in Rankin Inlet

Nunavut Tunngavik Incorporated (NTI; Inuktitut: ᓄᓇᕗᑦ ᑐᙵᕕᒃ, Nunavut Tunngavik) is the legal representative of the Inuit of Nunavut for the purposes of native treaty rights and treaty negotiation. The presidents of NTI, Makivik Corporation, Nunatsiavut Government, and the Inuvialuit Regional Corporation, the four regional land claims organizations, govern the national body, the Inuit Tapiriit Kanatami (ITK) as its board of directors. NTI continues to play a central role in Nunavut, even after the creation of the Government of Nunavut. As the successor of the Tunngavik Federation of Nunavut, which was a signatory of the Nunavut Land Claims Agreement on behalf of Inuit, NTI is responsible for ensuring that the Nunavut Land Claims Agreement is implemented fully by the Government of Canada and the Government of Nunavut and that all parties fulfill their obligations.

NTI is governed by an eight-member board of directors. Two of the directors -the President and Vice President are elected directly by beneficiaries of the Nunavut Land Claims Agreement who are 16 years and older. Six of the directors are the Presidents and Vice Presidents of the three Regional Inuit Associations located in Nunavut. The four member Executive consists of the presidents of NTI and the three RIAs.

== Mandate ==
NTI’s mission is to implement "Inuit economic, social and cultural well-being" through the Nunavut Land Claims Agreement. NTI originated as a political activist body. Although it is now an organization with significant responsibilities for administering the Nunavut Land Claims Agreement (NLCA), it continues as an advocate for the rights of Inuit. NTI plays a lead role in helping Inuit and Inuit organizations understand their rights and obligations under the NLCA. Finding out what the NLCA says is the first step for anyone who wants to use his or her rights or benefits. The Government of Nunavut protects the interests of all residents of Nunavut and NTI protects the rights of Inuit in Nunavut.

== History ==
What is now known as Nunavut was officially separated from the Northwest Territories on April 1, 1999, through the 1993 Nunavut Act and the 1993 Nunavut Land Claims Agreement Act.

== Board of directors ==
In 2025 the Board included Jeremy Tunraluk, President, Paul Irngaut, Vice-President, James Eetoolook, A/President of the Kitikmeot Inuit Association (KIA), Lawrence Otokiak, A/KIA Vice-President, Kono Tattuinee, President of the Kivalliq Inuit Association, Patrick Tagoona, Vice-President of the Kivalliq Inuit Association, Olayuk Akesuk, President of the Qikiqtani Inuit Association, and Levi Barnabas, Vice-President of the Qikiqtani Inuit Association.

== Departments ==
The NTI consists of ten departments: Lands & Resources, Wildlife, Marine, Claim Implementation, Human Resources, Business & Economic Advancement, Communications, Legal Services, IT, Finance, Administration, and Social & Cultural Development.

== Nunavut Land Claims Agreement ==
For NTI, the Nunavut Land Claims Agreement, signed in May 1993 by Inuit and the Canadian government, is the central structure through which NTI identifies policy priorities and directions. Policy and program priorities are determined by what Claim obligations, either Inuit or government, have yet to be implemented. Priorities can stem from the necessity of meeting ongoing Inuit obligations. Inuit were represented by the Tungavik Federation of Nunavut, which went on to become Nunavut Tunngavik Inc. The Government of Canada and the Government of the Northwest Territories signed the NLCA on behalf of the Queen.

The NLCA will protect this reality by giving special duties to Inuit organizations like NTI with respect to language, culture and social policy. These duties might be handled directly by NTI or by Designated Inuit Organizations. The NLCA brings many rights and benefits to Inuit. The NLCA recognizes the contributions of Inuit to Canada’s history, identity and sovereignty in the Arctic.

Once the NLCA was signed and became law in Canada, Tungavik Federation of Nunavut TFN transformed into NTI. NTI was created to ensure that all 42 Articles of the NLCA were implemented. NTI continues to implement those articles today. NTI also works to protect the rights and benefits of Inuit as outlined in the NLCA.

== Nunavut Lands and Resources Devolution Agreement ==
Following the NLCA, in January 2024 NTI, with the federal and territorial governments, signed the Nunavut Lands and Resources Devolution Agreement (NLRDA); transferring federal responsibilities to Nunavut and NTI as granted to provinces in the Constitution Act, 1867. The terms of the NLRDA primarily describe: transfer of administrative and legislative powers, jurisdiction over natural resources, environmental assessments, federal support for increasing the Inuit presence in Nunavut's administration, financial transfers between the parties, and shared obligations between NTI and Nunavut.

The NLRDA mitigates three criticisms of the NLCA regarding Indigenous and environmental justice. The NLCA abolished Aboriginal Title in exchange for territorial autonomy and federal financial support, and while Aboriginal Title remains abolished the NLRDA significantly increased the authority of Nunavut's legislature and NTI. Reliance on non-renewable resources was promoted under NLCA, encouraging resource extraction as Nunavut's primary economic goal, while federal jurisdiction remained over most territory. The NLRDA devolved all Crown (public) lands and waters to territorial and NTI jurisdiction, strengthening consent mechanisms for Inuit communities on environmental and economic policy. Lastly, though the NLCA prohibited Nunavut from amending its relationship with the federal government, the NLRDA supersedes the NLCA enabling amendment if agreed between Nunavut and NTI. NTI President Aluki Kotierk characterized devolution as "a critical step towards Inuit having meaningful control over the fate of our homeland.", while Nunavut Premier P.J. Akeeagok stated that "we can now bring decision-making about our land and waters home.".

== Organization ==
NTI has an eight-member Board of Directors that guides the organization. The Board of Directors includes the NTI president, vice-president, and the presidents and vice-presidents of the three Regional Inuit Associations. NTI’s president and vice-president each hold office for a four-year term. NTI also has a five-member executive committee. The president and vice-president of NTI and the presidents of the three RIAs make up the executive committee. Approximately 75 people work for NTI in Cambridge Bay, Rankin Inlet, Iqaluit and Ottawa. Most of NTI’s employees are Inuit. NTI’s executive officers, board of directors and employees all work toward ensuring the NLCA is implemented.

== Background ==
Nunavut "our land" in Inuktut, is a territory with a public government and the homeland of Inuit in Canada's eastern Arctic. In 1993 a Nunavut-wide Inuit vote and the Canadian Parliament ratified the Nunavut Agreement. By April 1, 1999, when the Government of Nunavut and the Nunavut Territory was created, it represented the "largest comprehensive land claim settlement ever reached between a state and its Indigenous Peoples."

By the late 1960s, young Inuit men and women were graduating from high schools and vocational training in Churchill, Manitoba, Whitehorse, Yukon, and Ottawa where they had opportunities to meet with other young people from different regions to discuss common problems and consider political change. As a result these young graduates founded two organizations in 1970. The Committee for Original Peoples' Entitlement (COPE) was established in the western Arctic in response to exploratory oil seismic work on Banks Island in October, 1970 that threatened the subsistence of local trappers. In the eastern Arctic, the Inuit Tapirisat of Canada (ITK) was founded in 1971. In 1973, the ITK initiated the Inuit Land Use and Occupancy Project which used land use mapping or counter-mapping methodologies, resulting in a three volume publication, based on research by a team of experts working closely with Inuit across Canada. According to Milton Freeman who oversaw the project, it "documented the total Inuit land use area of the Northwest Territories, then stretching from the Mackenzie River to east Baffin Island," to provide "information in support of the fact that Inuit have used and occupied this vast northern land since time immemorial and that they still use and occupy it to this day." Hugh Brody worked on the project from 1976–78 as coordinator in the North Baffin region. He also assembled an Arctic-wide account of Inuit perceptions of land occupancy, building a collage of Inuit voices from all the communities of the Northwest Territories.

In the 1979 case Baker Lake v. Minister of Indian Affairs the plaintiffs, the Inuit Tapirisat of Canada (ITK) and the Baker Lake Hunters and Trappers Association from Baker Lake, concerned that "government-licensed exploration companies were interfering with their aboriginal rights, specifically, their right to hunt caribou" took the Minister of Indian Affairs before the Federal Court of Canada. Justice Mahoney recognized the existence of Aboriginal Title in Nunavut.

A September 5, 2018 report "Raising children" by the University of Calgary based Children First Canada and the O'Brien Institute for Public Health, wrote that Nunavut had the highest infant mortality rate (IMR) in Canada — 17.7 per 1,000 live births, much higher than the Canadian average IMR of 4.7. The president of Nunavut Tunngavik Incorporated, Aluki Kotierk, said she hoped this would "spark rage" at the dire living conditions of some Nunavummiut children. The report, which provided a snapshot of the health and well-being of Canadian children based on data collected by Statistics Canada, the Canadian Institute for Health Information (CIHI), the Canadian Institutes of Health Research (CIHR), Health Canada, the Public Health Agency of Canada (PHAC), the Canadian Pediatric Society, UNICEF report cards and Organisation for Economic Co-operation and Development (OECD) reports, warned that Canada's IMR was higher than all other European OECD countries and compared to all OECD countries, Canada ranks 30th of 44.
