= Martin O'Brien =

Martin O'Brien may refer to:

- Martin O'Brien (artist), British performance artist
- Martin O'Brien (journalist), Irish journalist and author
- Martin O'Brien (footballer) (1875–1946), Australian rules footballer
- Martin O'Brien (humanitarian) (born 1964), human rights activist and charity administrator in Northern Ireland
- Martin O'Brien (hurler) (1885–1958), Irish hurler
- Martin O'Brien (politician), Canadian politician

== See also ==
- Marty O'Brien, American bassist
