= CESR =

CESR may refer to:

- Center for Economic and Social Rights, an international human rights organization
- Centre d'Etude Spatiale des Rayonnements, now the Institut de Recherche en Astrophysique et Planétologie (IRAP), in France
- Committee of European Securities Regulators, replaced since 2011 by the European Securities and Markets Authority (ESMA)
- Cornell Electron Storage Ring, a particle accelerator operated by Cornell University, in Ithaca (state of New York)
- Carrier Ethernet Switches and Routers, a marketing term
