= Shawan Jabarin =

Palestinian human rights activist (born 1960)

- شعوان جبارين
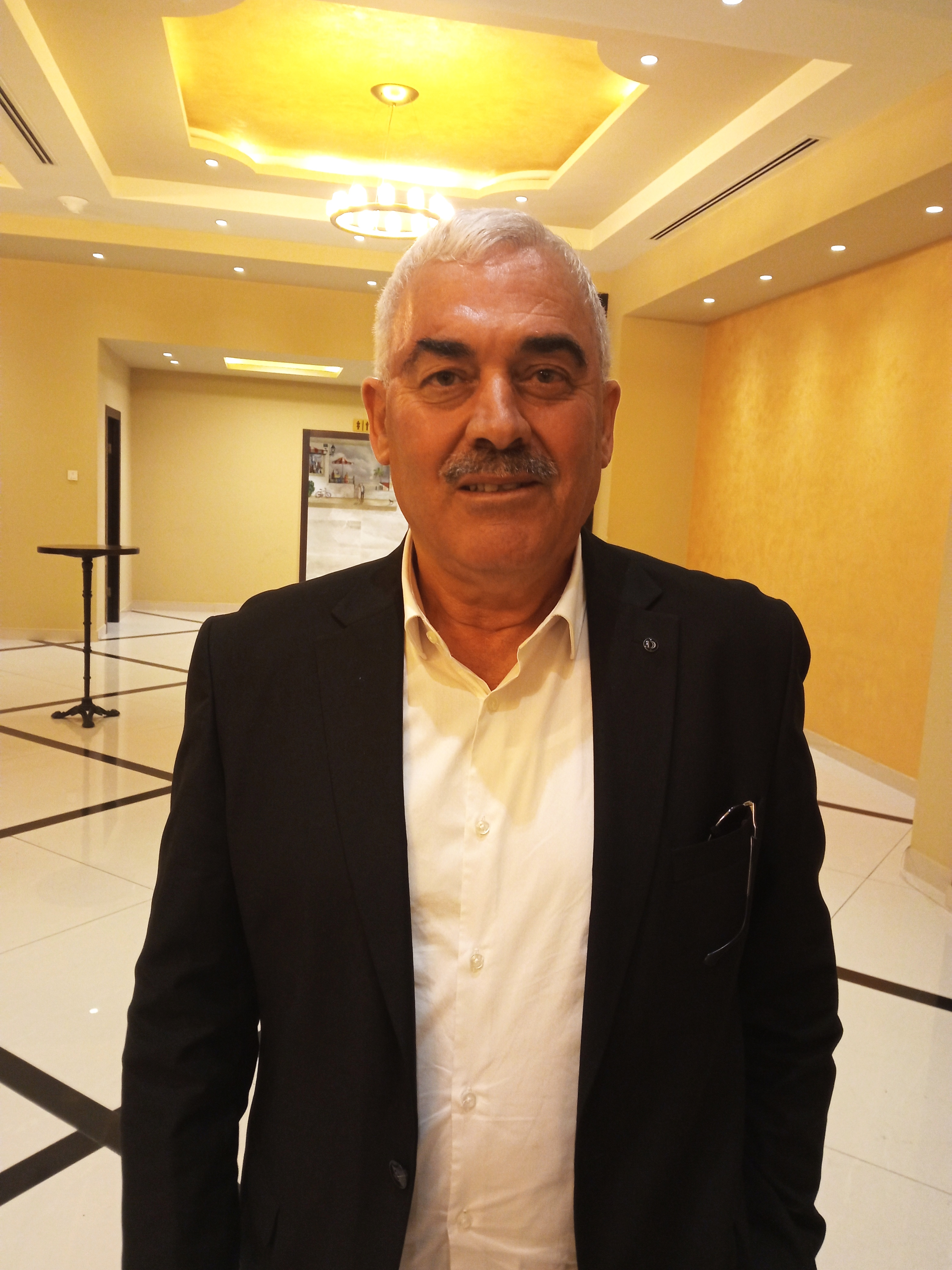
- Born: Shawan Rateb Abdallah Jabarin; 1960 (age 65–66); Sa'ir, Palestine
- Education: Birzeit University; Irish Center for Human Rights

Shawan Rateb Abdallah Jabarin (Arabic: شعوان راتب عبد الله جبارين, romanized: Shaʻwān Rātib ʻAbd Allāh Jabārīn; born 1960) is the general director of Al-Haq, a Palestinian human rights organization in the West Bank. From 2005 to 2009, Jabarin was a member of the board of directors of Defense for Children International – Palestine, the national section of the Geneva-based Defense for Children International, a non-governmental organization (NGO) established in 1979.

Respected as a human-rights activist by Human Rights Watch (HRW), Amnesty International, and various Palestinian human-rights groups, and condemned by many Israeli and other organizations, He has won multiple human-rights awards and contributed to such journals as Foreign Policy. Israel's Supreme Court has described him as a "senior activist" for the Popular Front for the Liberation of Palestine (PFLP). Jabarin has been barred from entering Jordan on security grounds, and was banned from international travel by Israel between 2006 and 2013.

== Early life and education ==
Jabarin was born in 1960 in the village of Sa'ir (Sayer), in the Hebron district. His family were West Bank farmers. As a young man, he was subjected to administrative detention and interrogation by Israeli authorities.

He studied sociology at Birzeit University in the 1980s, where he belonged to a student group associated with the Popular Front for the Liberation of Palestine (PFLP). Jabarin later studied law in Ireland; he is a graduate of the Irish Centre of Human Rights, NUI Galway, where he completed the LL.M programme in 2004-5 through a grant from the Irish Department of Foreign Affairs' Irish Aid programme.

== Career ==
=== Al Haq ===
Jabarin began volunteering with Al-Haq while he was a student at Birzeit University. He joined Al-Haq as a field researcher in 1987. He became its director in 2006; His office is in Ramallah.

Under his leadership, according to one source, "Al Haq's staff of Palestinian and foreign researchers have shifted their search for legal redress from Israel's military and civilian courts to foreign venues."

=== HRW position and controversy ===
In February 2011, Jabarin was appointed by the Human Rights Watch (HRW) to its advisory board that oversees reporting on Arab-Israeli affairs. Robert Bernstein, HRW's founding chairman and chairman emeritus, told The Daily Beast: "I am of course shocked but even more saddened that an organization dedicated to the rule of law seems to be deliberately undermining it". Bernstein said that HRW had done the "wrong thing" and that "they could have put other people on the board who would not have created this problem for them".

Stuart Robinowitz, a lawyer who had led three human-rights fact-finding missions for HRW and the American Bar Association, was described as "distressed that the appointment seems to have been made without disclosure of all the facts by two HRW executives, Middle East and North African director for HRW, Sarah Leah Whitson, and the executive director, Ken Roth". Robinowitz complained that "Whitson in her written presentation stated that Jabarin had had no association since PFLP since 1987, thereby ignoring actions against him by Israel and Jordan security authorities in 2005 and 2006, and by the Israeli Supreme Court in 2007, 2008, and 2009". Robinowitz asked: "Why didn't Ms. Whitson and Mr. Roth tell the board about the court opinions in January 2011, when they were asking the board to approve Mr. Jabarin?" He accused Whitson and Roth of "misleading conduct," saying they had "put themselves above the law by assuming they can disregard the Israeli Supreme Court, which is one of the most highly respected judicial bodies in the world," and called the Jabarin incident "part of a pattern of conduct that casts doubt about Mr. Roth's and Ms. Whitson's ability to deal with matters affecting Israel in a balanced and objective manner". Robinowitz wrote: "In 2006, Jordan barred [Jabarin] entry for security reasons. Do staff members of HRW have more reliable information about Jabarin than the supreme court and security services of Jordan and Israel?"

Apropos of Jabarin's HRW appointment, Sir Harold Evans stated that "Israel's Supreme Court says Shawan Jabarin leads a double life, as a human rights activist who also has a secret association with a terrorist organization. Human Rights Watch says he does invaluable work for peace, but its founding chairman and others consider Jabarin's appointment shocking".

Gerald Steinberg, the president of the Jerusalem-based NGO Monitor, said that Jabarin's appointment to the HRW board "ends any façade that Human Rights Watch is a moral 'watchdog' organization". The appointment, he said, "completed the transformation [of HRW] from a human rights watchdog to a radical agit-prop group". Steinberg accused Jabarin of using "the language of human rights to lead delegitimization campaigns targeting Israel" and accused HRW of "abusing human rights as a façade for radical ideology". He said that "Human Rights Watch has been working together with Jabarin and Al-Haq in an informal capacity for a long time, but the official appointment is an example of HRW Executive Director Ken Roth's and the group's Middle East and North Africa division's enlistment in the widespread delegitimization campaign being conducted against Israel".

Jennifer Rubin of The Washington Post argued in February 2011 that Jabarin's appointment to the HRW board reflected "the continuing decline of the organization....This appointment is a slap in the face from HRW Executive Director Ken Roth and chairman James Hoge to terror victims, Israelis, Jews, and others who seek to uphold universal human rights". Rubin also called the appointment "the latest of numerous moral failings, scandals and biases that have exposed HRW as a political advocacy organization".

In response to criticism of HRW's appointment of Jabarin to its Middle East board, HRW's program director, Iain Levine, described the Supreme Court's charges as "curious and misguided" and insisted that Jabarin was "the reason that tyrants in the Middle East are now trembling in their boots." His description of Jabarin as "one of the leading Palestinian voices condemning … suicide bombings and rocket attacks against Israeli civilians" drew criticism. Ann Hertzberg, for example, commented: "I have been personally monitoring Al Haq [Jabarin's NGO] and Jabarin for nearly 5 years. I have never seen any evidence that either has condemned suicide bombings or rocket attacks." Robert Bernstein agreed, saying that he had searched unsuccessfully for evidence to support Levine's claim.

=== Goldstone Report and controversy ===
In a 2009 critique of the Goldstone Report for The Guardian, Dan Kosky focused on the report's reliance on video testimony by Jabarin, whose contributions, Kosky argued, were "overshadowed by evidence that he is 'among the senior activists of the Popular Front terrorist organisation'." The report cited Al-Haq's allegations "at least 30 times."

== Other professional activities ==
He took part in a four-month programme on human-rights advocacy at Columbia University in 2001.

In May 2013, Jabarin was elected vice president of the International Federation for Human Rights (FIDH), an independent international NGO based in France. Jabarin had also been elected Commissioner of the International Commission of Jurists. In August 2016, Jabarin was elected Secretary General of FIDH.

Jabarin participated in an event entitled "Palestine, Israel & International Law: The ICC and beyond" on October 11, 2013, at Trinity College in Dublin.

== Arrests and imprisonments ==
Jabarin was convicted in 1985 of recruiting for and arranging training for members of the PFLP outside of Israel and served nine months of a 24-month jail sentence. He spent six years in Israeli prison without charge or trial during the 1980s and 1990s.

=== 1989 arrest ===
In late October 1989, the windows on Jabarin's home were smashed and the front door kicked in. A few days later, on October 10, 1989, Israeli soldiers knocked on the door of Jabarin's home near Hebron and took him away. They allegedly blindfolded and handcuffed him, pushed a cloth into his mouth, and burned him with cigarettes on his ear and his hands. Then, it is alleged, one of them forced him down on the bathroom floor and stepped with army boots on his head, chest, and hands, He was taken to the Hadassah Hospital in Jerusalem for examination where a doctor reportedly said he has been hit on the head and had breathing difficulties.

A 1994 Israeli statement to the UN alleged that Jabarin "had not discontinued his terrorist involvement and maintains his position in the leadership of the PFLP." A June 2007 decision by the Israeli Supreme Court called Jabarin a "Dr Jekyll and Mr Hyde."

Jabarin has said "he had lost track of the number of times he'd been arrested and detained by Israeli authorities. He estimated that he'd spent a cumulative eight years in administrative detention and claimed to have been beaten on numerous occasions". In August 1990, Amnesty International adopted Jabarin as a prisoner of conscience. In November 1994, the UN Working Group on Arbitrary Detention declared his detention arbitrary.

== Travel ban ==
Jabarin has been denied exit visas by Israel and Jordan on several occasions due to alleged ties to the PFLP. Israel placed a travel ban on Jabarin in 2006, after he was made director of Al-Haq. Israel cited "secret evidence" indicating that he was still involved with PFLP. The travel ban was condemned by Amnesty International, the Israeli human rights organization B'Tselem, and Human Rights Watch, all of which dismissed Israel's claims that it was founded on "security" considerations.

When Jabarin petitioned the Israeli Supreme Court in 2008 to lift the travel ban, the Court explained that it could not show the evidence against him to his lawyers, yet insisted that "it is reliable information according to which the petitioner is among the senior activists of the Popular Front terrorist organization" and claimed that "the divulging of this material to the petitioner involves the exposure of important sources of information, and thus certain harm to national security." The Israeli human rights group Adalah has described it as "disturbing" that the travel ban "is based on secret information." Adalah characterized this as undermining due process.

Jabarin's lawyer in the 2008 hearings on his travel ban, Michael Sfard, quoted the opening line of Franz Kafka's The Trial in court: "Someone must have slandered Josef K., for one morning without having done anything truly wrong, he was arrested."

=== 2009 Netherlands trip ===
The Dutch government asked Israel in 2009 to lift the travel ban on Jabarin so that he could travel to the Netherlands to accept the Dutch Geuzenpenning Award for human rights defenders. On February 12, 2009, the Israeli Supreme Court rejected Jabarin's petition to leave the country to participate in the awards ceremony.

While upholding the travel ban, the Court underscored that it was not meant as a "punishment" for illegal activity but as a security measure. The spokeswoman for the Court, Ayelet Filo, said that it had "real evidence" that Jabarin was "involved with terror groups." The two hearings were conducted in part with only the three judges, the State Attorney, and members of the Israeli General Security Services (GSS) present. Irish human rights organization Front Line Defenders expressed concern about the travel ban, noting that Jabarin had been allowed to leave the West Bank eight times between 1999 and February 2006, before becoming General Director of Al-Haq.

In March 2009, HRW issued a press release opposing the travel ban, in response to which the Vice Chair of HRW, film producer Sid Sheinberg, protested HRW not mentioning in the press release the Israeli Supreme Court's judgments against Jabarin. In a March 17, 2009, email to HRW officials, Sheinberg wrote that the press release was "misleading by important omission and therefore radically inaccurate."

=== 2010 Cairo trip ===
On March 28, 2010, Israeli forces prevented Jabarin from leaving the Palestinian territories. He had planned to travel to Cairo for a human-rights meeting at the Cairo Centre for Human Rights. He was held at the Allenby Bridge for two hours before being told that he could not leave the territories.

=== 2010 Ireland trip ===
He was not permitted to travel to Ireland in November 2010 to collect his award from the Irish Centre or Human Rights.

=== 2011 Denmark, New York, and Brussels trip ===
On November 28, 2011, Israeli authorities prevented Jabarin from crossing the Allenby/King Hussein Bridge into Jordan. Jabarin had been planning to go to Denmark to accept a human-rights prize from the PL Foundation, to New York to attend a Human Rights Watch board meeting, and to Brussels to participate in the EU-NGO Forum on Human Rights. Sarah Leah Whitson, the Middle East director for Human Rights Watch, criticized the upholding of the travel ban, praising Jabarin for his "courageous work."

=== 2012 Geneva trip ===
The Electronic Intifada reported in February 2012 that Jabarin would be allowed to travel to Geneva to meet Frank La Rue, the United Nations' Special Rapporteur on Freedom of Expression. The travel ban, however, would remain in place.

In a letter thanking Amnesty International members for their campaigning on his behalf, Shawan Jabarin wrote: "[As] I prepare myself to depart to Geneva, I have many conflicting thoughts and emotions running through my mind. I am happy because I, albeit temporarily, have regained my freedom to travel. However, I am dismayed because of the thought that many others continue to have their liberties crushed."

In March 2012, Jabarin was permitted to travel to Geneva to meet Frank La Rue, the UN special rapporteur on freedom of expression. In a March 2012 interview in Geneva with Adri Nieuwhof of the Electronic Intifada, Jabarin said that being in that city "reactivates me, strengthens the belief of the [Palestinian] people and the right to defend that strongly. I am in the struggle for people's rights. It [this visit] is a push for me to do more and more."

HRW and Amnesty International issued a statement on March 2, 2012, calling for Israel, which had allowed Jabarin to travel to Geneva, to revoke the travel ban entirely. They said that "if the authorities deem that there is no security risk in Jabarin travelling to meet with Special Rapporteur Frank La Rue today, it is hard to understand why the travel ban should remain in place at all, especially in the absence of any public evidence justifying it."

=== 2013 Ireland trip ===
He was again permitted to travel in 2013, when he went to Ireland. Israel's ambassador to Italy protested when Jabarin was invited by Laura Boldrini to testify about human rights violations before the Italian Parliament's Chamber of Deputies in December 2021. Complaints about his presence, and assertions he was a terrorist, were also voiced by representatives of the right wing Northern League and Forza Italia.

=== 2026 France trip ===
In April 2026, the French government refused to grant an entry visa to Jabarin, who was due to appear before the European Parliament's Subcommittee on Human Rights in Strasbourg. Human Rights Watch described the government's actions as a "shameful decision", while Amnesty International called it a "blatant assault on human rights".

On 13 November 2026, Israeli authorities imposed an international travel ban on Jabarin.

== Views ==
=== General views of Israel and the occupation ===
Jabarin has said that the Israelis "have no peace on their agenda. If it is on their agenda, they have their own interpretation. Israel is killing Palestinians every day, pushing peace further away. Israel killed any opportunity for real peace, completely ignoring Palestinian fundamental rights. For them, Palestinians are not a people that have rights." He claimed that Israeli settlers, even the young generation, show not just hatred, they show it in a very, very aggressive way." He said he foresaw "an explosion coming" in which the settlers would "be the main players," and he claimed to worry that there would be a large-scale massacre of Palestinians.

He has described Israeli treatment of Palestinians are being rooted in a "punishment mentality," saying that "[prisoners] have to take off their clothes while the rooms are searched, [the prison authorities] are transferring prisoners, isolating them for years. It is psychological torture."

He said in August 2013 that he felt the human-rights situation for Palestinians was "worsening." "There is more land confiscation; freedom of movement is more restricted. There is more destruction of property, like house demolitions. More than ever, the people have lost hope of living in peace with the Israelis. The economic situation has deteriorated. Everything deteriorated. Before, we used to close the roads, not the Israelis. We used to go to Gaza freely. Before we used to look at the Israeli settlements as isolated areas. Today, they're everywhere."

He has said that the Israeli legal system "doesn't work when it comes to the Palestinians," and thus he doesn't use it except in "selective cases."

Contrary to claims that Israel is singled out in the UN for condemnation, Jabarin has argued that the international community treats Israel better than other countries. "If Israel were Iran, I'm sure they would intervene" to help the Palestinians. "They would from day one. If Israel was in the place of Libya, Egypt or somewhere else, they would say, 'This is human rights. This is our obligation.'"

=== Land appropriation by Israel ===
Jabarin has said that international law "clearly prohibits Israel, as an occupying power, from appropriating land located in the West Bank" and that "Israel is also prohibited from constructing infrastructure that primarily benefits its own economy."

=== West Bank settlements ===
Jabarin said in 2013 that Israeli support for West Bank settlements was a violation of the Fourth Geneva Convention and the Rome Statute of the International Criminal Court. "The occupation, it's a temporary presence. And by transferring civilians, you try to make it permanent. That's the issue. The nature of that, it's like a colonialist nature," he said. "Here in [the] Palestinian case, settlements have affected every aspect of Palestinians' lives. The destruction of their property, the confiscation of their land, the expanding of Israeli jurisdiction over the settlements ... the legal characterization is, it's illegal apartheid." He has also said that while the European Union "has been quite outspoken in condemning settlements and their expansion, they continue to import produce from these same settlements and in doing so, help to sustain their very existence".

=== Administrative detention ===
Jabarin said in March 2013 that Israel's policy of administrative detention of Palestinian captives was "a violation of the principles and standards of due process and fair trial practiced in all democracies." He said that even though "Israel calls them terrorists, Palestinians look at them as heroes, as leaders."

=== Israel's treatment of media ===
Jabarin said in December 2012 that "Israel targeted journalists in Gaza intentionally. They feel these days that the media have power. The media can defeat any party by taking reports outside. It comes with the evolution of the media, the social media. It is everywhere available. As occupying power, Israel does not like the reporting, that is why the media and journalists were intentionally targeted. They [Israel] have no moral [sic]. The aim is not to get the reality out. The aim is to create dust and make people not to see what happens."

=== Israel as apartheid state ===
Jabarin has compared the situation in Israel to that in apartheid South Africa. He has said that he does not use the word "apartheid" lightly when describing the Israeli-Palestinian situation. "It took us a long time before we started using this term. We studied it carefully, professionally, academically, and then we concluded that, yeah, based on the nature of this occupation and parts of its practices, we could say it meets the criteria of an Apartheid system." He has called this usage "constructive...for two reasons." First, "on the level of people's conscience, the Apartheid term is negative and leaves a bad impression." Second, many UN resolutions address apartheid, compelling international action against it.

=== Palestinian statehood ===
Jabarin said in December 2012 that it was "a positive sign that some close friends of Israel," including the Netherlands, Germany and Australia, had abstained on a recent vote for Palestinian statehood. Noting that Britain had "asked the Palestinian Authority to sign a commitment not to go to the International Criminal Court for twenty years as condition for their 'yes' vote," Jabarin said that given that Britain was "responsible for the Palestinian case," this action showed them to have "the lowest moral possible." He accused both Britain and France of "play[ing] with the pain and suffering of the victims instead of providing justice, protection and remedy. As if Palestinians are not fully human beings, equals."

Jabarin has said that "the acceptance of Palestine as a non-member observer state" at the UN "opened the door for Palestinians to use legal mechanisms in the future. Palestine can join the Geneva Conventions. It can join the Sea Treaty, which is important for Palestine to protect natural resources such as gas and petroleum, and to protect its right to water. The Sea Treaty would include the Dead Sea. It means that if any company wants to dig, it cannot do so with Israel."

Jabarin said in a 2013 interview that he had "no hope for the short-term" in regard to Palestinian human rights and sovereignty. "But I have more than hope for the long-term....There is no future for occupation. I have no doubt of that. For me, it's a matter of time." He said his role was to fight to try to bring human rights to Palestinians sooner rather than later. "Maybe it will take years. I keep hope that it will happen in my lifetime. I don't know, to be honest."

=== Reconciliation between Hamas and Fatah ===
He said in December 2012 that "what we need now is the reconciliation between Fatah and Hamas. It is important for Palestinians to change the 'game' from bilateral agreements to unilateral agreements with the UN and international law as a basis for negotiations. After Gaza, after twenty years of failure of negotiations, we as Palestinians have to rethink our narrative, we have to take the lead."

=== European views of Israeli-Palestinian conflict ===
Jabarin has said that he takes hope from the "genuine change" in European opinion in recent years. Although "support to Israel is unconditional" in the US, he said, "we see every day new voices of intellectuals, activists and politicians who speak about this taboo, they criticize Israel."

Appearing on Arabic-language French TV in 2013, "Jabarin complained that while every European country that wanted to join the European Union was also required to join the ICC, Palestine was not allowed to join. That meant, he said, that despite the fact that the Palestinians suffered from a 'violation of their rights' and 'crimes,' the ICC could not provide them with a defense. He demanded that the French support Palestinian membership in the ICC, or at least not oppose it." He also "asked France to turn words into action and impose sanctions on Israel."

=== United States ===
Jabarin has accused the United States of "establishing linkages between legitimate resistance against occupation and terrorism." After 9/11, charged Jabarin, the U.S. "imposed its own definition of 'terrorism' and considered the Palestinian resistance against the Israeli occupation as a form of terrorism. Such a position by the United States was in the interest of Israel and gave her an opportunity to relate the Palestinians legitimate resistance to terrorism also." Bernstein commented that "it's hard to read this statement as anything other than a claim that this suicide terrorism was in fact a form of legitimate 'resistance.'"

=== Oslo peace accords ===
In a 2013 article for The Huffington Post, Jabarin argued that the Oslo peace process "was, in fact, a smokescreen, intended to hide the perpetuation of Israel's then 26-year-old occupation....The question remains as to whether this latest phase of the 'peace process' will allow the Palestinian people to exercise their sovereign rights". The "most fundamental weakness" of the Oslo agreement, he maintained, was "the absence of international law from its text....Palestinians have been barred from exercising their sovereign rights, while having their economic, social and political development stymied". Expressing concern that current negotiations might replicate what he called "Oslo's mistakes," he insisted that the PLO "guarantee that international law is the basis for negotiations".

=== Land swaps ===
In a June 2013 article, Jabarin argued against the Arab League's proposed inclusion of "land swaps as a central feature of renewed negotiations between Israelis and Palestinians." The plan, which was welcomed by U.S. Secretary of State John Kerry, would involve what Jabarin called "a softening of the 2002 Arab peace plan, which proposed that 22 Arab countries would normalize ties with Israel in return for withdrawal from land that it occupied in 1967." Jabarin opined that "mutual land swaps are problematic on both a political and a legal level; not least because they would inevitably involve protecting illegal Israeli settlements and their infrastructure in the West Bank, including East Jerusalem, which have been universally recognized as in violation of international law. Therefore, an agreement of this nature would implicitly condone Israel's illegal settlement enterprise, which routinely dispossesses Palestinians of their land and appropriates natural resources in the OPT. Such a move would also set a dangerous precedent in which prolonged colonial policies perpetrated by an aggressive occupier are eventually accepted by the international community. Any land swap agreement would further undermine fundamental norms of international law, such as the prohibition of acquisition of territory through force and the right to self-determination of the Palestinian people." Thus, land swaps should "be removed from the negotiating table."

=== Boycott, Divestment and Sanctions ===
He supports Boycott, Divestment and Sanctions but "at Al-Haq, we don't use the term 'boycott.' Not because we don't believe in it, but because there is no legal basis or obligation for it. Our points of reference are human rights, international humanitarian law and public law. There is a legal basis for 'sanctions' and 'divestment' under international law, but there is no legal basis for boycott. With a boycott, the public is responsible."

== Honors and awards ==
He "has won so many awards from various European and American organisations that he has trouble remembering the exact number." Among them are the Geuzenpenning Award and an award from the Danish PL Foundation.

In November 2010, the Irish Centre of Human Rights presented him with its distinguished graduate award.

In 1989, Jabarin was awarded the Reebok Human Rights Award, which is presented to young people who have contributed to freedom of expression and human rights.

== Personal life ==
He is a father of four and counts former United States President Jimmy Carter as a friend.
