= Atlantic Philanthropies =

Private philanthropic foundation

The Atlantic Philanthropies
- Founded: 1982
- Founder: Chuck Feeney
- Dissolved: September 14, 2020
- Purpose: Ageing, youth, human rights, poverty, progressive advocacy
- Method: Grantmaking
- Key people: Christopher Oechsli (President and CEO); Martin O'Brien (Senior Vice President of Programmes)
- Endowment: $1.4 billion (2012)
- Website: www.atlanticphilanthropies.org

The Atlantic Philanthropies (AP) was a private foundation created in 1982 by American businessman Chuck Feeney. The Atlantic Philanthropies focused its giving on health, social, and politically left-leaning public policy causes in Australia, Bermuda, Ireland, South Africa, the United States and Vietnam. It was among the largest foreign charitable donors in each of the countries in which it operated, and was the single largest funder of programs that encouraged the civic engagement of older people and of comprehensive immigration reform in the United States. With the single largest advocacy grant ever made by a foundation, the Atlantic Philanthropies committed $27 million to win passage of the Affordable Care Act in the United States. About half of the Atlantic Philanthropies' grants were made in donations that allow lobbying.

The Atlantic Philanthropies commenced a spend-down process in 2012, and planned to fully close down by 2020 after the remaining portion of Feeney's fortune was donated. On September 14, 2020, Feeney signed the documents to officially close the nonprofit in an online ceremony that included a congratulatory video message from Bill Gates.

== History ==
Irish-American businessman Chuck Feeney established the Atlantic Philanthropies in Bermuda in 1982. The organization made its first grant of $7 million that same year to Cornell University.

Feeney, who co-founded Duty Free Shoppers (DFS), transferred all of his assets and his entire 38.75% ownership stake in DFS to what became the Atlantic Philanthropies in 1984. For the first fifteen years of Atlantic's existence, donations were made anonymously, and organizations receiving grants were required to sign contracts agreeing to not reveal the source of their donations.

Atlantic's charitable giving remained anonymous until 1997, when a business dispute Feeney was involved in forced him to disclose the funding for Atlantic.

The President and CEO of the Atlantic Philanthropies was Christopher Oechsli as of 2011. He was appointed in 2011, succeeding Gara LaMarche. Martin O'Brien was appointed Senior Vice President of Programmes shortly thereafter.

The Atlantic Philanthropies donated over $8 billion from 1982 to 2020. The Atlantic Philanthropies was a limited-life foundation (following plans for a spend-down put forward in 2002), which stated it would close its doors upon the successful completion of its task of giving away to charity all of founder Chuck Feeney's fortune (except for $2 million he had set aside decades earlier for the retirement of himself and his wife). In 2020, Feeney announced that the foundation had successfully achieved its purpose, and on September 14, 2020, he signed the documents to officially close the nonprofit in an online ceremony.

== Activities ==
AP concentrated its donations in the areas of aging, children and youth, population and health, and reconciliation and human rights. As of 2013, the Atlantic Philanthropies had distributed $6.5 billion, which would increase to over $8 billion by the time of its dissolution.

=== Australia ===
In Australia, AP donated more than $AUD500 million, including $AUD250 million in Queensland. These donations have been directed toward the building or expansion of 20 research facilities in Australia.

=== Northern Ireland ===
In Northern Ireland, AP controversially supported the Northern Ireland Human Rights Commission in its work to develop and promote proposals for a Bill of Rights for the region. It has also funded a coalition of civil society groups, the Bill of Rights Consortium.

=== Republic of Ireland ===
AP helped to fund the Irish Government's research funding mechanism, the Programme for Research in Third Level Institutions (aka PRTLI), through its five cycles from 1998 to around 2018.

AP invested over $1 billion in third-level education in Ireland, funding research facilities at the University of Limerick and Dublin City University as well as a library and sports facility at Trinity College Dublin. AP's grants in Ireland have been credited by some for stimulating the Irish economy in the 1990s.

In 2005, it funded the short-lived Centre for Public Inquiry.

In 2009, AP indicated that it would grant €80 million in Ireland in 2009 to children, elderly and human rights projects. In 2011, AP awarded a €1.2 million grant to Barnardo's, one of Ireland's best-known children's charities.

In 2004 to 13, AP provided $11.5m and political advice to the Gay and Lesbian Equality Network and three other Irish gay-rights groups. Prior to the 2015 same-sex marriage referendum, Catholic commentator Breda O'Brien characterised this as "American money buy[ing] an Irish referendum".

As of 2014, a total of $226 million in Atlantic grants have leveraged $1.3 billion of government money to the Irish university system.

AP gave several grants to the Centre for Ageing Research and Development in Ireland.

=== United States ===
In March 2009, AP pledged $125 million to the University of California, San Francisco to fund a medical center at the Mission Bay campus. At the time, it was the single largest grant the Atlantic Philanthropies had given. The project broke ground in October 2010.

From 2008 to 2010, AP donated $27 million to Health Care for America Now (HCAN) to support their efforts to pass the Patient Protection and Affordable Care Act. It was the single largest advocacy grant ever made by a foundation.

In 2011, AP gave $350 million to Cornell University to help build Cornell Tech, a new graduate school campus on New York City's Roosevelt Island. At the time, the gift was the largest donation in the university's history.

=== Vietnam ===
From 1997 to 2013, AP donated $381.5 million towards health and educational causes in Vietnam, including funds to modernize the country’s public and primary health systems, promote healthier behavior (including backing a country-wide anti-smoking campaign and an initiative that resulted in a national law mandating helmet use by motorcycle riders) and revitalize libraries and universities.

=== Culminating grants ===
In 2014, the Atlantic Philanthropies announced that it was making a series of major culminating grants, including one to foster peace and human rights in Northern Ireland, another to help fund a national dementia strategy in Ireland, and a third to expand the Center for Budget and Policy Priorities, a Washington, D.C.–based liberal think tank.

Recipients of 2016 culminating grants include the London School of Economics, for support of the International Inequalities Institute, and the Rhodes Trust, to fund the newly established Atlantic Institute.

The Atlantic Philanthropies awarded UC San Francisco and Trinity College Dublin $177 million to create the Global Brain Health Institute, a groundbreaking venture to stem the precipitous rise in dementia by training and connecting a new generation of leaders worldwide.
