= Inuit Circumpolar Council =

Inuit-run non-governmental organization

- Conférence circumpolaire inuite (French); Inuit Issittormiut Siunnersuisooqatigiiffiat (Greenlandic); ᐃᓄᐃᑦ ᐅᑭᐅᖅᑕᖅᑐᒥᐅᖃᑎᒌᑦ ᑲᑎᒪᔨᖏᑦ (Inuktitut); Инуитский Приполярный Совет (Russian)
- The logo of the Inuit Circumpolar Council; Stylised motif of a frame drum with a handle and a stick

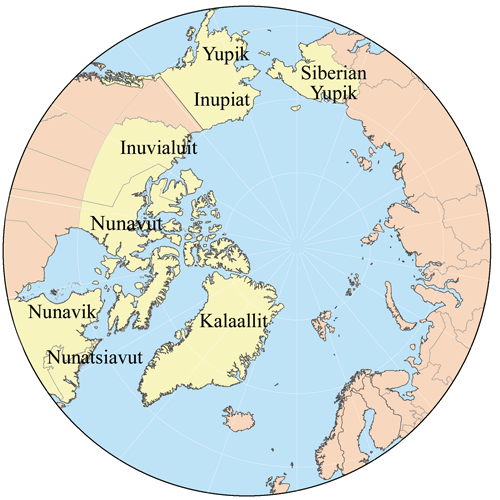
- Member states and regions of the Inuit Circumpolar Council
- Abbreviation: ICC
- Formation: June 1980
- Founded at: Nuuk, Greenland
- Type: Inter- and multinational non-governmental organization (NGO)
- Legal status: active
- Purpose: To promote and to ensure rights, interests, and the development of Inuit culture and languages.
- Headquarters: Anchorage, Alaska; Ottawa, Canada; Nuuk, Greenland; Anadyr, Russia
- Region served: 4 regions: Alaska; Canada; Greenland; Russia
- Members: 180,000
- Official languages: English, French
- Chair of the Inuit Circumpolar Council: Sara Olsvig
- Vice-Chairs of the Inuit Circumpolar Council: President of ICC Alaska; Marie Greene; President of ICC Canada; Lisa Qiluqqi Koperqualuk; President of ICC Greenland; Kuupik Kleist; President of ICC Russia; Irina Mishina
- Main organ: ICC International
- Website: www.inuitcircumpolar.com

Former logo of the Inuit Circumpolar Conference

The Inuit Circumpolar Council (ICC; formerly the Inuit Circumpolar Conference) is a multinational non-governmental organization (NGO) and Indigenous Peoples' Organization (IPO) representing the 180,000 Inuit and Yupik (sometimes referred to as Eskimo) people living in (from west to east) the United States (Alaska), Canada (Inuit Nunangat), Kingdom of Denmark (Greenland), and Russia (Chukotka Autonomous Okrug / Chukchi Peninsula).

The Conference, which first met in June 1977 in Barrow, Alaska (now Utqiaġvik), initially represented indigenous circumpolar peoples from Canada, Alaska and Greenland. In 1980 the charter and by-laws of ICC were adopted. The Conference agreed to replace the term Eskimo with the term Inuit. This has not however met with widespread acceptance by some groups, most pre-eminently the Yupik (see Background section below). The goals of the Conference are to strengthen ties between Arctic people and to promote human, cultural, political and environmental rights and polities at the international level.

ICC holds a General Assembly every four years. ICC is one of the six Arctic indigenous communities to have the status of Permanent Participant on the Arctic Council.

== Background ==
The ICC represents the following groups and regions by population size: (Note: Although they are often considered a Yupik group and speak a Yupik language that is closely related to Central Alaskan Yupʼik, the Alutiiq / Sugpiaq are not represented by the ICC.)

Country	Group		Region(s)
Canada (Inuit Nunangat)	Central Inuit		Nunavut; Nunavik, Quebec; Nunatsiavut, Newfoundland and Labrador
Canada (Inuit Nunangat)	Inuvialuit		Inuvialuit Settlement Region, Northwest Territories
Canada (Inuit Nunangat)	Copper Inuit		Kitikmeot Region, Nunavut; Inuvialuit Settlement Region, Northwest Territories
Greenland	Greenlandic Inuit		
Greenland	Greenlandic Inuit	Kalaallit	Sermersooq; Avannaata; Qeqqata; Kujalleq; Qeqertalik
Greenland	Greenlandic Inuit	Tunumiit	Sermersooq
Greenland	Greenlandic Inuit	Inughuit	Avannaata
United States (Alaska)	Yup'ik		Calista Region; Bristol Bay Region; Bering Straits Region
United States (Alaska)	Iñupiat		NANA Region; Arctic Slope Region; Bering Straits Region
United States (Alaska)	St. Lawrence Island Yupik		Bering Straits Region
United States (Alaska)	Cup'ik		Calista Region
Russia (Chukotka)	Siberian Yupik		Providensky District; Chukotsky District; Iultinsky District
Russia (Chukotka)	Big Diomede Island Inupiat		Providensky District; Chukotsky District; Iultinsky District

All of these peoples are sometimes collectively referred to by the exonym Eskimo, the use of which is frowned upon by many of the Inuit, especially in eastern Canada. ICC uses the term Inuit to refer to them all, which has its own problems. One of those is administrative: an Inuk in the United States could be considered "Native American", "Alaskan Native" or "Aboriginal American". The Yupik of both Alaska and Russia generally prefer being called Yupik. Inuit is currently used in Alaska but it is not a word in the Yupik languages, nor a word which they traditionally used to describe themselves. Eskimo, which was formerly used in Alaska, is generally dying out.

== Structure and functions ==
The main goals of the organization are to strengthen unity among Inuit, to promote their human (Indigenous and Linguistic) rights and interests, and to ensure the development of Inuit culture.

Structurally, the organization is made up of four separate offices in each of the four Inuit homelands, chartered individually under their national rules. The Presidents of ICC Chukotka, ICC Alaska, ICC Canada, and ICC Greenland, along with one Executive Council Member elected from each of the nations, make up the eight-member ICC Executive Council. The Executive Council is presided over by an International Chair (formerly International President—the title was changed in 2002).

ICC holds a General Assembly every four years, bringing together Inuit from across the northern circumpolar region to discuss issues of international importance to their communities, provide direction for the work of the organization over the next four years, and divide responsibility for issue areas between the national offices. Assembly delegates appoint an international chair from the General Assembly host-country, along with the members of the Executive Council, and develop policies and resolutions for the coming term.

The General Assembly, and thus the International Chair position, rotates between the four Inuit nations quadrennially at the General Assemblies. At the 2002 General Assembly in Kuujjuaq, Nunavik, Canada, the Chair passed from Greenland, where it had been held for the previous seven years by Aqqaluk Lynge, now a member of the United Nations Permanent Forum on Indigenous Issues, to Canada, where Sheila Watt-Cloutier, formerly the President of ICC Canada, took the position.

In 2006, the Chair passed to ICC Alaska at the General Assembly in Barrow, and was then occupied by Patricia L. Cochran, formerly executive director of the Alaska Native Science Commission. At that Assembly, ICC also voted to change its name to Inuit Circumpolar Council as there has been perennial confusion over an organizational name that sounds more like a past meeting.

== Leadership ==
The leadership of the ICC was initially organized with one president and three regional vice presidents. A fourth vice-president was added when Russia/Chukotka joined the ICC. The president later came to be unknown as chairperson or international chairperson.

Source
Session	International	Canada	Greenland	Alaska	Chukotka
1980–1983	Hans-Pavia Rosing	Mary Simon	Aqqaluk Lynge	James Stotts	n/a
1983–1986	Hans-Pavia Rosing	Mark Gordon	Aqqaluk Lynge	James Stotts	n/a
1986–1989	Mary Simon	Rosemarie Kuptana	Aqqaluk Lynge	Caleb Pungowiyi	n/a
1989–1992	Mary Simon	Les Carpenter	Aqqaluk Lynge	Edna McLean	Alexander Omrypkir & Nadezda Sudakova (ex officio)
1992–1995	Eileen MacLean (1992–1993); Caleb Pungowiyi (1993–1995)	Minnie Grey	Ingmar Egede	Gloria Simeon	Zoya Ivanova
1995–1998	Rosemarie Kuptana (1995–1997); Aqqaluk Lynge (1997–1998)	Sheila Watt-Cloutier	Aqqaluk Lynge	Ronald Brower	Tatiana Achirgina
1998–2002	Aqqaluk Lynge	Sheila Watt-Cloutier	Alfred Jakobsen (1998–1999); Uusaqqak Qujaukitsoq (1999–2002)	Dennis Tiepelman	Lubov Otrokova
2002–2006	Sheila Watt-Cloutier	Duane Smith	Aqqaluk Lynge	Chuck Greene	Natalia Rodionova
2006–2010	Patricia Cochran (2006–2009); Jimmy Stotts (2009–2010)	Duane Smith	Aqqaluk Lynge	Chuck Greene	Tatiana Achirgina
2010–2014		Duane Smith	Carl Christian “Puju” Olsen	James Stotts	Tatiana Achirgina
2014–2018	Okalik Eegeesiak	Duane Smith (2014–2016); Nancy Karetak-Lindell (2016–2018)	Hjalmar Dahl	James Stotts	Tatiana Achirgina
2018–2022	Dalee Sambo Dorough	Monica Ell-Kanayuk	Hjalmar Dahl	James Stotts	Liubov Taian
2022–2026	Sara Olsvig	Lisa Qiluqqi Koperqualuk (2022–2025); Natan Obed (2025); Herbert Nakimayak (2025–2026)	Kuupik Kleist (2022–2023); Hjalmar Dahl (2023–2026)	Marie Greene	Egor Vereshagin

== See also ==
- Saami Council
- West Nordic Council
- Arctic cooperation and politics
- United Nations Permanent Forum on Indigenous Issues
- International Day of the World's Indigenous Peoples
- Working Group on Indigenous Populations
- Indigenous and Tribal Populations Convention, 1957
- Indigenous and Tribal Peoples Convention, 1989
- Declaration on the Rights of Indigenous Peoples
