= Sheila Watt-Cloutier =

Inuk environmentalist

Sheila Watt-Cloutier OC
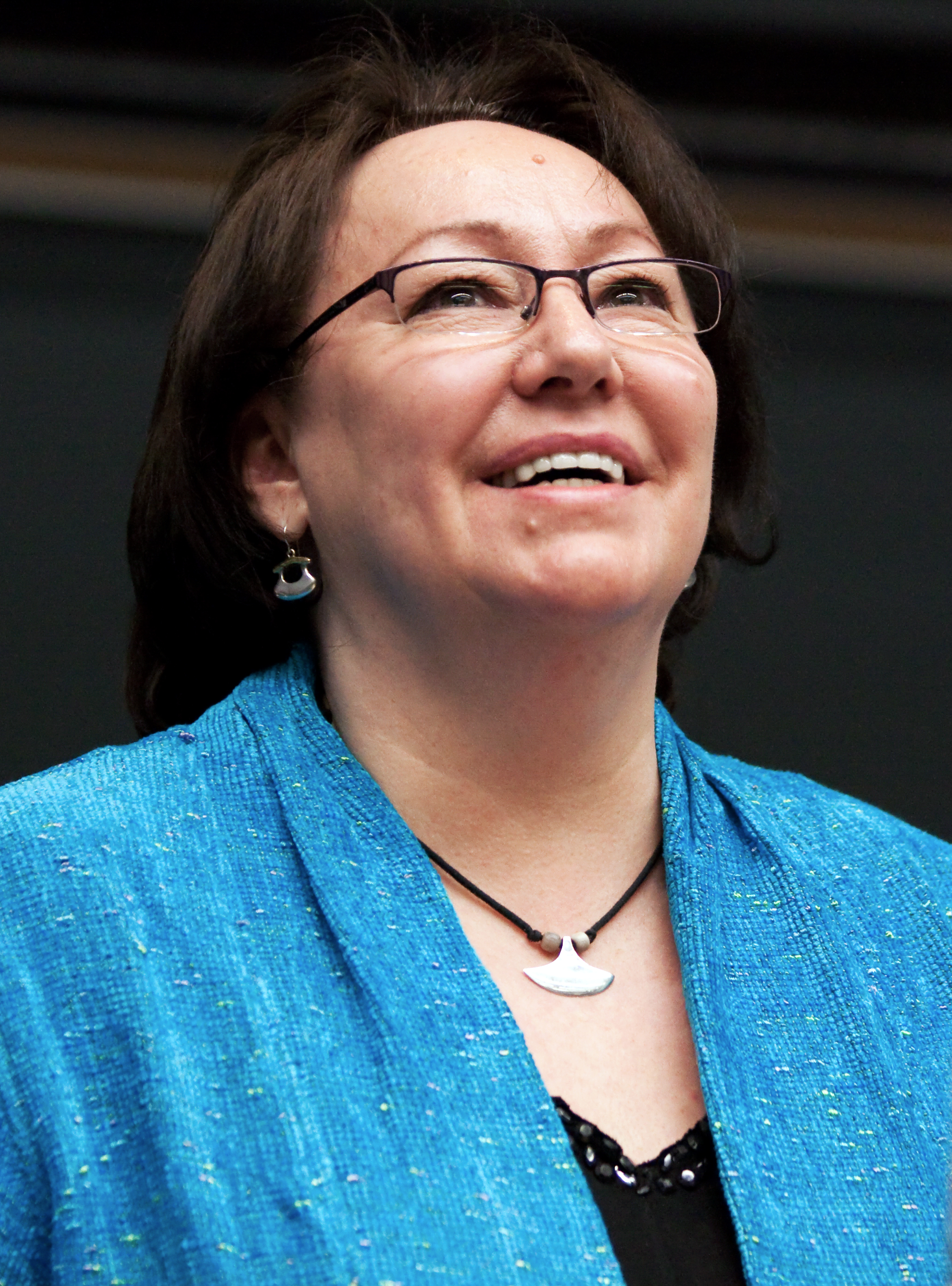
- Watt-Cloutier in 2009
- Born: 2 December 1953 (age 72); Kuujjuaq, Nunavik, Quebec, Canada
- Occupation: Activist
- Awards: Order of Canada, Right Livelihood Award

Sheila Watt-Cloutier OC (born 2 December 1953) is a Canadian Inuk activist. She has been a political representative for Inuit at the regional, national and international levels, most recently as International Chair for the Inuit Circumpolar Council (formerly the Inuit Circumpolar Conference). Watt-Cloutier has worked on a range of social and environmental issues affecting Inuit, most recently, persistent organic pollutants and global warming. She has received numerous awards and honours for her work, and has been featured in a number of documentaries and profiled by journalists from all media. Watt-Cloutier sits as an adviser to Canada's Ecofiscal Commission. She is also a senior fellow at the Centre for International Governance Innovation.

== Early life ==
Sheila Watt-Cloutier was born in Kuujjuaq, Nunavik, Northern Quebec, Canada. Her mother was known as a skillful healer and interpreter throughout Nunavik, and her father was an officer for the Royal Canadian Mounted Police. For the first ten years of her life, Sheila was raised traditionally, travelling on the land by dog sled, before she was sent away for school in Nova Scotia and Churchill, Manitoba in the Canadian Indian residential school system.

== Early career ==
In the mid-1970s, she worked for the Ungava Hospital as an Inuktitut translator and strove to improve education and health conditions. From 1991 to 1995, she worked as a counsellor in the review process of the education system of Northern Quebec. This work led to the 1992 report on the educational system in Nunavik, Silaturnimut - The Pathway to Wisdom. Watt-Cloutier also contributed significantly to the youth awareness video Capturing Spirit: The Inuit Journey.

== Political career ==
Watt-Cloutier has been a political representative for Inuit for over a decade. From 1995 to 1998, she was Corporate Secretary of Makivik Corporation, the Canadian Inuit land-claim organization established for Northern Quebec (Nunavik) under the 1975 James Bay and Northern Quebec Agreement.

In 1995, she was elected President of Inuit Circumpolar Council (ICC) Canada, and re-elected in 1998. ICC represents internationally the interests of Inuit in Russia, Alaska, Canada and Greenland. In this position, she served as the spokesperson for indigenous peoples in the Arctic during the negotiation of the Stockholm Convention banning the manufacture and use of persistent organic pollutants (POPs), including Polychlorinated biphenyl (PCBs) or DDT. These substances pollute the Arctic food chain and accumulate in the bodies of Inuit, many of whom continue to subsist on local country food.

In 2002, she was elected International Chair of ICC, a position she would hold until 2006. Most recently, her work has emphasised the human face of the impacts of global climate change in the Arctic. On 7 December 2005, based on the findings of the Arctic Climate Impact Assessment, which projects that Inuit hunting culture may not survive the loss of sea ice and other changes projected over the coming decades, she launched the world's first international legal action on climate change: a petition, along with 62 Inuit hunters and Elders from communities across Canada and Alaska, to the Inter-American Commission on Human Rights, alleging that unchecked emissions of greenhouse gases from the United States have violated Inuit cultural and environmental human rights as guaranteed by the 1948 American Declaration of the Rights and Duties of Man. Although the IACHR decided against hearing her petition, the Commission invited Watt-Cloutier to testify with her international legal team (including lawyers from Earthjustice and the Center for International Environmental Law) at their first hearing on climate change and human rights on 1 March 2007.

== Publications ==
Her book The Right to Be Cold, about the effects of climate change on Inuit communities, was published by Allen Lane - Penguin Random House in 2015.

Her memoir The Right to Be Cold: One Woman's Story of Protecting Her Culture, the Arctic and the Whole Planet (2015) was short-listed for Canada Reads, where it was championed by musician Chantal Kreviazuk. It was also a finalist for Shaughnessy Cohen Prize for Political Writing Activist. Naomi Klein reviewed the books for the Globe and Mail, calling it "courageous and revelatory".

- "The Inuit Journey Towards a POPs-Free World." Northern Lights Against POPs: Combating Toxic Threats in the Arctic. Ed. David Leonard Downie and Terry Fenge. Montreal: McGill-Queen's University Press, 2003. 256–267.
- "Don’t Abandon the Arctic to Climate Change." The Globe and Mail 24 May 2006: A19.
- "ICC responds to last week’s editorial." Nunatsiaq News 9 June 2006: Opinion.
- "Nunavut must think big, not small, on polar bears." Nunatsiaq News 19 January 2007: Opinion.
- "The Strength to Go Forward." CBC: This I Believe 23 May 2007.
- "Canada's Way." The Ottawa Citizen 29 August 2007.
- "Ozone treaty offers insurance against climate change." The Globe and Mail 6 September 2007: A19.

== Awards and honours ==
All cities in Canada unless noted.

=== 2002 ===
- Global Environment Award, World Association of Non-Governmental Organizations - Washington, D.C., United States (on behalf of ICC Canada)

=== 2004 ===
- National Aboriginal Achievement Award (Environment), National Aboriginal Achievement Foundation (now Indspire) - Ontario

=== 2005 ===
- Sophie Prize, The Sophie Foundation - Oslo, Norway
- Champion of the Earth Award, United Nations Environment Programme - Nairobi, Kenya
- Governor General's Northern Medal - Ottawa, Ontario

=== 2006 ===
- International Environmental Leadership Award, 10th Annual Green Cross Millennium Awards, hosted by Global Green USA - Los Angeles, California, United States
- Honorary Doctor of Law, University of Winnipeg - Winnipeg, Manitoba
- Citation of Lifetime Achievement, Canadian Environment Awards - Vancouver, British Columbia
- International Environment Award, Gala 2006, Earth Day Canada - Toronto, Ontario
- Order of Greenland, Inuit Circumpolar Conference General Assembly - Barrow (now Utqiagvik), Alaska, United States
- Officer of the Order of Canada - Ottawa, Ontario

=== 2007 ===
- On 2 February 2007 The Globe and Mail published a report that Watt-Cloutier, along with former Vice President of the United States, Al Gore, had been nominated for the 2007 Nobel Peace Prize along with over 180 other people. The report stated that they had been nominated by Børge Brende and Heidi Sørensen, both Norwegian members of parliament. The article also pointed out that the Norwegian Nobel Committee does not comment on the names of people who may have been nominated and according to the statutes of the Nobel Foundation they do not publish the names.
- Rachel Carson Prize - Stavanger, Norway
- Mahbub ul Haq Human Development Award, United Nations Human Development Awards - New York City, New York, United States

=== 2008 ===
- Testimonial Award, 21st Annual Public Policy Forum Testimonial Dinner and Awards - Toronto, Ontario
- Honorary Doctor of Laws, University of Ottawa - Ottawa, Ontario
- Honorary Doctor of Letters, University of Guelph - Guelph, Ontario
- Honorary Doctor of Laws, University of Windsor - Windsor, Ontario
- Honorary Doctor of Laws, Royal Roads University - Victoria, British Columbia
- Honorary Doctor of Laws, Wilfrid Laurier University - Waterloo, Ontario
- Honorary Doctorate, Institut national de la recherche scientifique (INRS, 'National Institute of Scientific Research) - Quebec City, Quebec
- Honorary Doctor of Laws, McMaster University - Hamilton, Ontario
- Heroes of the Environment (2008), from Time under the "Leaders and visionaries" category

=== 2009 ===
- 9th Annual LaFontaine-Baldwin Lecture - Iqaluit, Nunavut
- Honorary Doctor of Laws, University of Western Ontario - London, Ontario
- Honorary Doctor of Laws, University of Alberta - Edmonton, Alberta
- Honorary Doctor of Laws, Queen's University - Kingston, Ontario
- Doctor of Humane Letters, Honoris Causa, Bowdoin College - Brunswick, Maine, United States

=== 2010 ===
- Nation Builder of the Decade: Environment, The Globe and Mail
- Honorary Doctor of Laws, University of Victoria - (November 2010) Victoria, British Columbia

=== 2011 ===
- Honorary Doctor of Laws, University of Northern British Columbia - (May 2011) Prince George, British Columbia

=== 2012 ===
- Honorary Doctor of Laws, Thompson Rivers University - Kamloops, British Columbia
- Honorary Doctor of Laws, Mount Allison University - Sackville, New Brunswick

=== 2015 ===
- Honorary Doctor of Laws, York University - Toronto, Ontario
- The Right Livelihood Award "for her lifelong work to protect the Inuit of the Arctic and defend their right to maintain their livelihoods and culture, which are acutely threatened by climate change."

== Personal life ==
Watt-Cloutier has a daughter, a son, and a grandson. Prior to returning to Kuujjuaq, she resided in Iqaluit, Nunavut for 15 years.

== See also ==
- Indigenous Canadian personalities
