= Aqqaluk Lynge =

Indigenous Greenlandic politician (born 1947)

Aqqaluk Lynge (born in 1947 in Aasiaat, Greenland) was the president of the Inuit Circumpolar Council (formerly the Inuit Circumpolar Conference) from 1995 to 2002. He is a former member of the Inatsisartut and one of the founders of the Greenlandic political party Inuit Ataqatigiit. An indigenous Kalaaleq, in 2004 Lynge became a member of the United Nations Permanent Forum on Indigenous Issues, which is an advisory body to the U.N.'s Economic and Social Council. He was a visiting fellow at the Dartmouth College Institute of Arctic Studies in 2008 and received an Honorary Doctorate in Humane Letters from the college in 2012. Lynge has also become known as an author of poetry and essays, published in Greenlandic, Danish, English and French.
