= Juliana Dogbadzi =

Ghanaian human rights activist

Juliana Dogbadzi is a Ghanaian human rights activist who has received the Reebok Human Rights Award.

Dogbadzi is a former victim of Trokosi who now campaigns against this practice that sends young women into forced labor, to redeem the sins of their relatives.

Juliana Dogbadzi was held for 17 years in Trokosi in Ghana and was physically, mentally and sexually abused until she escaped from the camp at the age of 23.

She established a non-profit organization, International Needs Ghana, that works for the release of Trokosi victims.

== Biography ==
When Dogbadzi was seven years old, her parents abandoned her at a Trokosi shrine to pay for the theft committed by her grandfather. The Trokosi followers told her that her involuntary servitude would stop a string of misfortunes from befalling her family. Dogbadzi served under conditions of slavery for about 17 years. During this time, she was starved, overworked, beaten and prevented from attending school. Around age 12, she was raped by the 90-year-old fetish priest who was the father of her first child.

At age 25, Dogbadzi escaped Trokosi and started a campaign to fight against them, spurring a national debate in Ghana.

Dogbadzi established International Needs Ghana, which has freed over 1,000 women from Trokosi custody at 15 shrines.

In 1999, she received the Reebok Human Rights Award.

One of the girls her charity helped to be released was Brigitte Sossou Perenyi who was adopted by an American and went on to also campaign and to be named one of the BBC's 100 Women in 2018.
