= Reebok Human Rights Award =

American award by Reebok

- Awarded for: Given to activists under the age of thirty who fight for human rights through non-violent means
- Sponsored by: Reebok
- Country: United States
- Presented by: Reebok Foundation
- First award: 1988
- Final award: 2007; 19 years ago

The Reebok Human Rights Award honoured activists under the age of thirty who fought for human rights through non-violent means. Each year, the award was given to four or five individuals. Each received a grant of US $50,000 that was to be used to support their human rights work. The awards were underwritten by the Reebok Foundation.

Roots can be traced to 1988 when Amnesty International invited Reebok to sponsor Human Rights Now!, a series of worldwide music concerts. Youth from close to 40 countries received the award since it was established in 1988. No awards have been given out since 2007.

== Laureates ==
=== 2007 ===
- Laura McCargar, United States
- Anderson Sa, Brazil
- Iryna Toustsik, Belarus
- Ou Virak, Cambodia

=== 2006 ===
- Li Dan, China
- Rachel Lloyd, United States
- Khurram Parvez, India
- Otto Saki, Zimbabwe

=== 2005 ===
- Zarema Mukusheva, Chechnya/Russia
- Carlos Rojas, Mexico
- Aloysius Toe, Liberia
- Charm Tong, Burma/Thailand

=== 2004 ===
- Yinka Jegede-Ekpe, Nigeria
- Vanita Gupta, United States
- Joenia Batista de Carvalho, Brazil
- Ahmad Nader Nadery, Afghanistan

=== 2003 ===
- Pedro Anaya, United States
- Anusuya (Oona) Chatterjee, United States
- Mohamed Pa-Momo Fofanah, Sierra Leone
- Ernest Guevara, Philippines
- Christian Mukosa, Democratic Republic of Congo

=== 2002 ===
- Kavwumbu Hakachima, Zambia
- Maili Lama, Nepal
- Malika Asha Sanders, United States

=== 2001 ===
- Ndungi Githuku, Kenya
- Heather Barr, United States
- Kodjo Djissenou, Togo
- Will Coley, United States

=== 1999 ===
- Juliana Dogbadzi, Ghana
- Tanya Greene, United States
- Suba Meshack, Kenya
- Ka Hsaw Wa, Burma

=== 1998 ===
- Abraham Grebreyesus, Eritrea
- Rana Husseini, Jordan
- Van Jones, United States
- Dydier Kamundu, Democratic Republic of Congo

=== 1996 ===
- Innocent Chukwuma, Nigeria
- Jesús Tecú Osorio, Guatemala
- Julie Su, United States
- Ma Thida, Burma
- Craig Kielburger, Canada

=== 1995 ===
- Angela Elizabeth Brown, United States
- Miguel Angel de los Santos Cruz, Mexico
- Richard Nsanzabaganwa, Rwanda
- Ven. Phuntsog Nyidron, Tibet
- Broad Meadows Middle School, United States

=== 1994 ===
- Adauto Alves, Brazil
- Rose-Anne Auguste, Haiti
- Dilli Bahadur Chaudhary (Backward Society Education), Nepal
- Iqbal Masih, Pakistan
- Samuel Kofi Woods, Liberia

=== 1993 ===
- Marie-France Botte, Belgium
- Sia Runikui Kashinawa, Brazil
- Hisham Mubarak, Egypt
- Reverend Carl Washington, United States

=== 1992 ===
- Floribert Chebeya Bahizire, Zaire
- Fernando de Araujo, East Timor
- Stacy Kabat, United States
- Martin O'Brien, Northern Ireland

=== 1991 ===
- Mirtala Lopez, El Salvador
- Sauveur Pierre, United States
- Abubacar Sultan, Mozambique
- Carlos Toledo, Guatemala
- Ashley Black, United States

=== 1990 ===
- Jeffrey Bradley and Martin Dunn, United States
- Shawan Jabarin, West Bank
- Tracye Matthews, United States
- Akram Mayi, Iraq
- David Moya, Cuba

=== 1989 ===
- Louise Benally-Crittenden, United States
- Michael Brown and Alan Khazei, United States
- Li Lu, Wang Dan, Chai Ling and Wu'erkaixi, China
- Mercedes Doretti and Luis Fondebrider, Argentina
- Dawat Lupung, Malaysia
- Bryan Stevenson, United States

=== 1988 ===
- David Bruce, South Africa
- Joaquin Antonio Caceres, El Salvador
- Janet Cherry, South Africa
- Arn Chorn-Pond, United States
- Tanya Coke, United States
- Lobsang Jinpa, Tibet
- Salim Abdool Karim, South Africa
- Winona LaDuke, United States
- Juan Pablo Letelier, Chile
- Maria Paz Rodriguez, United States
- Dalee Sambo, United States
