= Rana Husseini =

Jordanian journalist and activist

Rana Husseini (Arabic:رنا الحسيني; born 1969) is a Jordanian journalist and human rights activist who exposed honour crimes in Jordan and campaigned for stronger legal penalties against perpetrators. She became a published author in 2009 with her book, Murder in the Name of Honor: The True Story of One Woman's Heroic Fight Against An Unbelievable Crime (Oneworld Publications). In her work, she focused on raising awareness and fighting against social issues that were considered taboo. Following the release of Husseini's book, the National Jordanian Committee to Eliminate the So-called Crimes of Honor was formed in 1998. This committee demanded for the criminals to not be released easily or given a lenient sentence, collecting thousands of signatures along the way. She also influenced the 2007 fatwa in Jordan stating that honor killings are against religious law. The government responded to her reports by implanting more serious legal and judicial changes and in 2017 the Penal Code was amended, improving human rights to women as well as people with disabilities. Her second book Years of Struggle: The Women's Movement in Jordan was published in 2021, and she is currently a senior reporter at The Jordan Times.

== Biography ==
Rana Husseini was born in 1969. She has been an active journalist and activist since 1993, when she began working for The Jordan Times.

After hearing the story of a 16 year old girl that was raped, silenced and then killed by her brother for tarnishing her family's honor in 1994, Ranaa Husseini was inspired to write a book about her and many other women that experienced the same fate . She started advocating against honor killing and fought for violence against women to stop specifically in Jordan. She also wanted to shed light on and document the Women's movement and highlight all the sacrifices and the suffering they had to do that was not talked about in history books.

Husseini was an advocate for woman for local and international organizations. She also worked as a consultant and trained reporters and journalism students in workshops about gender, human rights and violence against women. She was a lecturer and panelist in several national and international conferences and was the main speaker at talks held at governmental and non-governmental organisations, high schools, universities and clubs. She has served as a regional coordinator for the United Nations Development Fund for Women (UNIFEM) and as an advisor to the U.S. government-funded human rights organization Freedom House. She is currently a senior reporter at The Jordan Times and serving in several boards.

=== Memberships ===
- Advisory Board Member - Equality Now Organisation, since 2015
- Board Member – Jordanian National Committee for Demining and Rehabilitation since 2003
- Member - Judges Panel – Kurt Schork Awards (Journalism) 2010
- Board of Directors Member – Man Up Campaign (USA) since 2010
- Member - Jordan Press Association since 2005
- Board Member – Forefront Organisation (USA) 1999, since 2005
- Member - “Jordanian National Committee to Eliminate so-called Honour Crimes” 1999 - 2003
- Member of Judges Panel – Amnesty International Global Award for Human Rights Journalism since 2001

=== Sports engagements ===
- Board Member - Jordan Football Association (JFA) 2009 - 2018
- President of the Women’s Football Committee at the JFA 2009 - 2018
- Member - FIFA Committee for Women’s Football and the FIFA Women’s World Cup 2011- 2016
- Board Member - Arab Women’s Football Committee 2011- 2013
- Board Member - Jordan Basketball Federation 2003 - 2004
- Team Captain - Jordanian Women's National Basketball Team 1995 - 2000
- Team Member - Jordanian Women’s National Basketball Team 1983 - 2000
- Team Member - Jordanian Women’s National Handball Team 1983 - 1995
- Team Member - Variety of local and US soccer teams 1989 - 1996
- Team Member - University of Oklahoma Rugby Team 1990- 1991

== Published work ==
=== Books ===
Murder in the Name of Honor: The True Story of One Women's Heroic Fight Against an Unbelievable Crime

Rana Husseini's first book focuses on honour crimes and honor killings, predominantly in Jordan, on a social and religious aspect. It tells the story of her journalism with The Jordan Times, and her articles shedding light on the problem of honour killings. She discusses the story of a sixteen-year-old girl who was raped by her brother in Jordan in 1994, and then killed by her other sibling, explaining that it was this case that made her want to concentrate her reporting on violence against women. The books was translated to English, Arabic, Dutch, and Finnish.

The book was published in 2009 by Oneworld Publications and is distributed in the United States by Simon & Schuster.

Reviews on the book:

- BBC
- DemocracyNOW
- PBS
- SMH
- HuffingtonPost
- The Guardian

Years of Struggle: The Women's Movement in Jordan

Rana Husseini's second book focuses on the women's movement in Jordan. It begins with a history of the development of women's political activity in the twentieth century from the 1940s to the 1990s. The book includes a discussion of the impact of the Arab Spring on the Jordanian Women's Movement, as well as chapters on disabled women, women's education and the Syrian refugee crisis. The author stated that her book was designed for younger generations because "they need to know our history, told by Jordanians". The publication of the book was supported by the Friedrich-Ebert-Stiftung Jordan Office, and the book is available open access online.

Reviews on the book:

- DAWN MENA
- Alaraby
- JordanTimes
- Albawaba
- Raseef22
- ALGhad
- ALRai
- Petra News

=== Other publications ===
She contributed chapters in:

- The "Abraham’s Children: Liberty and Tolerance in an Age of Religious Conflict” book.
- The "Honour, Violence, Women and Islam" book.
- The "Freedom House's Survey of Women's Rights in the Middle East and North Africa" report.
- The “A Modern Narrative for Muslim Women in the Middle East.” report.

She was also featured and mentioned in four books:

- “Leap of Faith…Memories of an Unexpected Life,” by Her Majesty Queen Noor.
- “Speak Truth to Power” by Kerry Kennedy.
- “That Takes Ovaries… Bold Females and their Brazen Acts” edited by Rivka Solomon.
- "Notable Muslims: Profiles of Muslim Builders of World Civilization and Culture" by Natana J. Delong-Bas

== Recognition ==
She has received multiple local and international awards including: a medal from Jordan's King Abdullah II in 2007, the Ida B. Wells award for Bravery in Journalism in 2003, the Human Rights Watch Award in 2000, the Reebok Human Rights Award in 1998, and the MEDNEWS prize award for best article in 1995. She is also featured in Kerry Kennedy's book Speak Truth to Power: Human Rights Defenders Who Are Changing Our World.

=== Awards ===
- The London Arabia Organisation Arab Women of the Year Awards for Social Impact — 2019
- The Moves Magazine’s Seventh Annual Power Women Award for the dedication, drive in the chosen sphere, and for the inspiration to so many women and making a difference in real lives — 2010
- Al Hussein Decoration for Distinguished Contribution, Second Order, bestowed by His Majesty King Abdullah II for activism in the human rights field and defending women causes in Jordan — 2007
- Distinguished Alumna Award from the Oklahoma City University Alumni Association for the significant contribution made in the profession and community — 2007
- Spanish Ciutat de L'Hospitalet Award for the Defence of Human Rights and Peaceful Coexistence for work on championing women's rights issues in Jordan — 2005
- Marie Claire Top Ten Women of the World Award for bringing attention to honor crimes against women in Jordan — 2004
- The Ida B. Wells Award for Bravery in Journalism – 2003
- Human Rights Watch Award granted for the overall reporting and activism against violence against women in Jordan – 2000
- Reebok Human Rights Award granted for reporting on violence against women in Jordan – 1998
- MEDNEWS (Med-Media Programme, European Union) prize award for best article: "Murder in the name of honour" – 1995

=== Other recognitions ===
- Chosen as one of 500 most influential Muslims by the Royal Islamic Strategic Studies Centre of Jordan – 2010
- Chosen as one of 50 Visionaries Who are Changing Your World by Utne Reader - 2009
- The Silent Witness Initiative to honor her life’s work of using her voice for others unable to speak out – 2006
- The Roger Williams University Women’s Centre for her outstanding contribution towards raising global awareness of the issue of [so-called] Honour Killings and sharing her message with the Roger Williams University community – 2006
- Equality Now Organization to honor her for being the first journalist to break the silence on so-called crimes of honor – 2005
- One of Women’s eNews 21 Leaders for the 21st Century for her remarkable work and achievements in a variety of ways to improve women’s lives - 2003
- Feminist Majority Foundation for her unique contribution to the historic struggle for women’s equality and human rights - 2000
