= Ahmad Nader Nadery =

Human rights activist

Ahmad Nader Nadery (born 1975) is an Afghan-born human rights activist and government official. He is the founding director of the Free and Fair Election Foundation of Afghanistan and a senior fellow at the Wilson Center. Formerly, he was a commissioner of the Afghan Independent Human Rights Commission and a senior advisor to Afghan President.

== Early life and education ==
Nadery was born in 1975 in the Nimruz Province to a known Pashtun family. He studied law at Kabul University and obtained his master's degree in international affairs from George Washington University. During this tenure, he was detained several times and exiled in Pakistan. In 1996, he was publicly flogged for not wearing a turban.

== Career ==
From 2016 to 2021, Nadery served as Chairman of the Independent Administrative Reform and Civil Service Commission (IARCSC). During his tenure, the United Nations Assistance Mission in Afghanistan (UNAMA) reported that the commission 'brought a revived commitment to advance reforms' and 'curbing corruption'.

In 2020, Nadery was appointed as a member of the peace negotiation team for the Afghanistan peace talks in Doha, Qatar.

Prior to his government service, he served as the Director of the Afghanistan Research and Evaluation Unit (AREU).

As of 2026, Nadery is a Senior Fellow at the Wilson Center, a Fellow at the Hoover Institution at Stanford University, and a Senior Fellow at the Hague Institute for Innovation of Law (HiiL). He is also a former fellow of the Asser Institute.

== Honors and awards ==
- TIME's 20 under 40 in Asia of 2004.
- Reebok Human Rights Award, 2004.
- Named a Young Global Leader by the World Economic Forum in 2008.
