= Dalee Sambo Dorough =

Inuk advocate for Indigenous rights

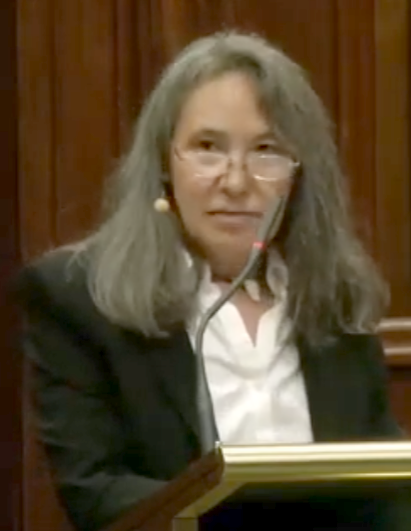
- Born: 1959
- Alma mater: Peter A. Allard School of Law; Fletcher School of Law and Diplomacy
- Occupation: Teacher, jurist, political scientist
- Awards: Fellow of the American Academy of Arts and Sciences (2023)

Darlene "Dalee" Sambo Dorough (born 1959) is an Iñupiaq advocate for Indigenous rights as well as an expert in international human rights law, international relations, and Alaska Native rights. Dorough was part of the Alaskan tribal sovereignty movement for decades and served on the United Nations Permanent Forum on Indigenous Issues from 2011 to 2016. In 2018 she was elected Chair of the Inuit Circumpolar Council, representing the 180,000 Inuit and Yupik people in the Russian Far East, Alaska, Canada, and Greenland.

== Early life and education ==
Darlene "Dalee" Sambo was born in Alaska in 1959. Her parents were raised in Unalakleet, an Inuit village, but she grew up in Anchorage. She was interested in issues affecting Alaska Natives from an early age, recognizing the problems with the Alaska Native Claims Settlement Act while in junior high.

While attending high school, Dorough organized an independent study working on the 1976 campaign of Inuk politician Eben Hopson for U.S. House of Representatives. Hopson founded the Inuit Circumpolar Council (ICC) in 1977, and Dorough began her volunteer work with the new organization at its first meeting, while she was still in high school. Before accepting her high school diploma, she completed the American Indian Lawyer Training Program in San Francisco and earned a certificate as a Tribal Court Advocate. From 1978 to 1981, she attended Anchorage Community College, which would later become the University of Alaska Anchorage.

In 1989 she moved to Boston to attend The Fletcher School at Tufts University, and she earned her Master of Arts in law and diplomacy in 1991. She went on to earn a Ph.D. from the University of British Columbia, Faculty of Law in 2002. Her daughter Hannah was born the day after she completed her comprehensive exams for her Ph.D.

== Career ==
After working as a paralegal for multiple organizations, in 1982 Dorough became the Executive Director for the Inuit Circumpolar Council in Anchorage, a position she held until 1989. She went on to serve as the Executive Director for the International Union for Circumpolar Health (from 1991 to 1993) and the Alaska Inter-Tribal Council (from 1993 to 1994).

From 2008 to 2018, Dorough was an Assistant Professor of International Relations at the University of Alaska Anchorage. In that role she took selected students to attend meetings of the United Nations Permanent Forum on Indigenous Issues. After leaving her position as assistant professor, she continued her affiliation with the university as a senior scholar and special advisor on Arctic Indigenous Peoples.

Dorough was appointed to the United Nations Permanent Forum on Indigenous Issues by the U.N. Secretary General in 2011, serving two three year terms. She is also the co-Chair of the International Law Association's Committee on Implementation of the Rights of Indigenous Peoples.

In 2018 Dorough was unanimously elected as chair of the Inuit Circumpolar Council. The organization represents approximately 165,000 Inuit from the Russian Far East, Alaska, Canada, and Greenland. Dorough's efforts include promoting food security and protecting the Arctic environment in the face of climate change.

== Awards ==
In 1988 Dorough was honored with a Reebok Human Rights Award, and in 1989 she received the Bill Edmunds Award from the Inuit Circumpolar Council, recognizing her efforts for the promotion of Inuit rights and interests. She was the recipient of a Patricia Roberts Harris Public Affairs Fellowship in 1989 and 1990. She was the recipient of a Fulbright Scholarship during the 1995-1996 academic year.

Dorough was one of the ten "Women of the Century" selected to represent Alaska's most influential women as part of a project sponsored by USA Today in 2020.
