= Sarah Leah Whitson =

American lawyer and human rights activist

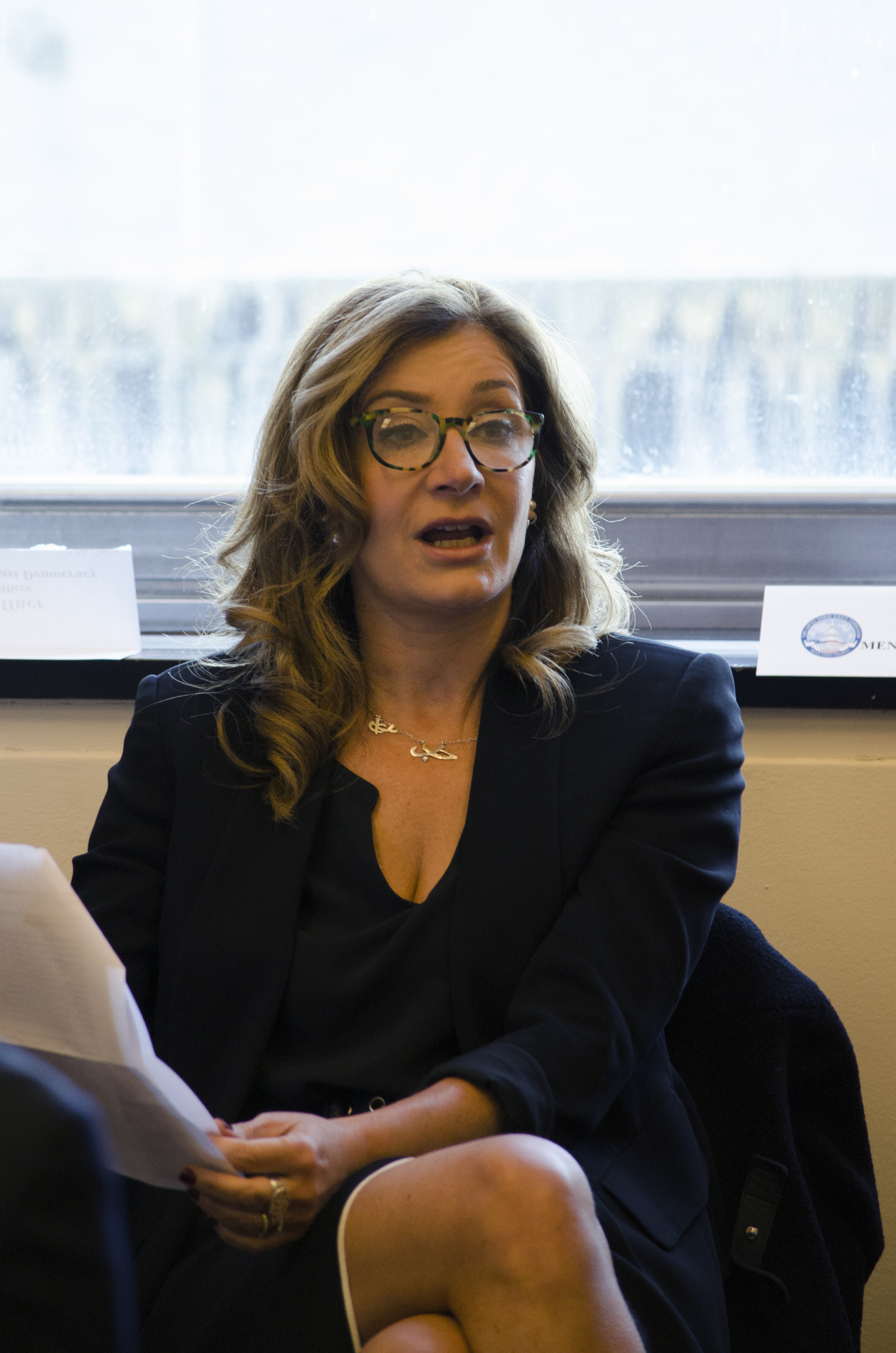
- Sarah Leah Whitson in Washington, D.C. in October 2017
- Education: UC Berkeley (B.A.); Harvard Law School (J.D.)
- Employer: Human Rights Watch

Sarah Leah Whitson is an American human rights lawyer. From 2020 to 2026 she served as founding executive director of Democracy for the Arab World Now (DAWN). From 2004 to 2020 she was director of the Middle East and North Africa division of Human Rights Watch. While with Goldman Sachs from 1997 to 2004 she also served as general counsel to the Center for Economic and Social Rights and engaged in other advocacy work. She is co-author of From Apartheid to Democracy: A Blueprint for Peace in Israel-Palestine, published in 2025.

== Early life and education ==
Whitson was reared by an Armenian American mother, Ashi Whitson, who was born in the Armenian Quarter of Jerusalem's Old City and immigrated to the United States in 1960. Her father was from Texas. Whitson was a student at Rose and Alex Pilibos Armenian School for 12 years in Los Angeles and spent childhood summers with family in Lebanon, Syria, and Jordan.

In 1988, Whitson graduated with a Bachelor of Arts degree from the University of California, Berkeley, located in Berkeley, California, taking time to study abroad in Egypt. In 1991, she graduated with a Juris Doctor degree from the Harvard Law School, where she was a classmate of Barack Obama's.

Whitson has written articles for such publications as Foreign Policy and Huffington Post.

== Career ==
=== Early career ===
After completing law school, Whitson worked for Goldman Sachs, the investment banking firm, and the law firm of Cleary, Gottlieb, Steen & Hamilton.

At the same time, according to the New Republic, she "pursued activism on the side, volunteering for, among other groups, the American-Arab Anti-Discrimination Committee (where she was co-organizer of a delegation in 2002 that lobbied Kofi Annan to press ahead with a United Nations investigation of Israel's Jenin operation) and MADRE (a women's rights group, with which she traveled to Lebanon on a solidarity mission in 1996 after an Israeli bombing campaign)." She served two terms on the board of directors of the New York chapter of the American-Arab Anti-Discrimination Committee, in 2001 and 2002.

Prior to working for HRW, she also served as general counsel to the Center for Economic and Social Rights, and traveled on human-rights missions to Iraq for that organization. In addition, she was a volunteer member of the Lawyer's Committee for Human Rights and the Armenian Bar Association, of which she remains a member. Moreover, Whitson was engaged in human-rights work for the Harvard Study Team and International Study Team missions examining the impact of war and sanctions on the Iraqi civilian population. She also participated in the International Human Rights Law Group's election-monitoring mission in Kurdish-controlled Northern Iraq.

=== Human Rights Watch ===
Whitson served as the director of the Middle East and North Africa (MENA) division of Human Rights Watch (HRW) from 2004 to 2020, publishing articles on the Middle East in international and regional publications and has leading dozens of advocacy missions throughout the region and has overseen numerous research missions and reports on human rights conditions there.

=== Democracy for the Arab World Now (DAWN) ===
In 2020 Whitson launched Democracy for the Arab World Now (DAWN) in the wake of the murder of DAWN founder Jamal Khashoggi, and served as founding executive director until 2026. At DAWN, Whitson developed litigation and advocacy strategies targeting policies of the United States and corporations, initiated projects on arms sales, sanctions, foreign influence, and transnational repression, pursued accountability for Khashoggi's murder, and established DAWN as a leading advocacy group for democracy, human rights, and justice in the Middle East and North Africa. She left DAWN in 2026, stating she had full confidence in her successor Omar Shakir.

=== Continuing advocacy and analysis ===
Whitson is the co-author, with Michael Schaeffer Omer-Man, of From Apartheid to Democracy: A Blueprint for Peace in Israel-Palestine, published in 2025 by the University of California Press. After leaving DAWN she continued to engage in advocacy and analysis with an article on Israel's actions in the 2026 Iran War published by the Quincy Institute for Responsible Statecraft in March 2026.

== Whitson's criticisms of Middle Eastern/North African governments ==
=== Algeria ===
In 2010, the Algerian government banned demonstrations in the capital and arrested organizers who claimed that state TV is merely a "propaganda machine." Whitson condemned the government's reaction and stated that it revealed "the sorry state of civil liberties in Algeria." In 2012, Algerian authorities were accused of delaying the trials of key terrorism cases. In the process of these delays, they detained some defendants for months and, in some cases, years in prison. Whitson criticized these delays, stating that president Abdelaziz Bouteflika-the president of Algeria- constantly speaks about judicial reform, "but when it comes to trying suspected militants, reform does not yet mean fairness." In May 2014 the Algerian government began to restrict workers' rights to form labor organizations. Human Rights Watch urged the International Labor Organization to push Algeria to remove this law. Whitson specifically commented on the issue and stated that Algeria should respect labor rights and let "workers organize unions and conduct union businesses without government interference."

=== Bahrain ===
In 2010, when the Bahraini government established a travel ban against human rights defenders, Whitson stated that authorities are preventing human rights activists from "spreading information about a recent spate of arrests of opposition members" and called upon the government to lift the travel ban. In March 2013, human rights activist Sayed Al-Muhafdha was sentenced to 30 days in jail after tweeting a picture of an injured protester. Whitson criticized the ruling and stated that tweeting a picture does not constitute "inciting violence". Further, in April 2013 the government of Bahrain detained opposition protesters and raided their homes. Whitson criticized the Bahraini government and their "commitment to reform" and emphasized the importance of free speech and assembly. Whitson also noted that the Bahraini government is "not serious about reform" and simply thinks that it can persuade Western allies otherwise.

=== Egypt ===
Since the military overthrow of Egyptian president Mohamed Morsi, Egypt's security forces have launched a campaign of persecution against the Muslim Brotherhood, "with mass killings of protesters, dragnet arrests of its supporters and attempts to ban the Brotherhood," Whitson wrote in The New York Times. She also noted that Egypt's military-backed government killed more than 1,000 protesters in 2013 – without being held to account. She criticized an Egyptian court for sentencing 529 Muslim Brotherhood members to death in a mass trial, even though only 70 of the accused appeared in court.

Medea Benjamin writing for Huffington Post quoted her as accusing Egypt's military government of trampling on Egyptian's basic freedoms.

=== Iran ===
Whitson has criticized Iran for locking up political prisoners, as well as for what she calls its "patently unfair justice system," especially for those facing execution. She has also come down against Iran's treatment and legal discrimination of women, as well as the jailing of women's rights activists. "The detention of these women activists is a stark reminder that Iran's government deprives its people of their most basic and fundamental rights" added Whitson. She has criticized the personal status of Iranian women in matters related to marriage, divorce, inheritance, and child custody. In 2011, Whitson spoke out against Iran's politically motivated trial of two American hikers, Josh Fattal and Shane Bauer, on supposed espionage charges, calling the trial "little more than a political jab at the United States." In 2009, following disputed Iranian presidential elections, Whitson condemned abuses of the pro-government Basij militias who were violently raiding the homes of opposition supporters, who had protested the election results, and beating residents in an attempt to end these protests.

=== Iraq ===
In October 2006 Palestinian refugees in Iraq were threatened to be killed if they did not leave the country. Whitson condemned the US's and Iraqi government's inaction, stating that they "must provide adequate security to the Palestinian community in Baghdad. In June 2013 an Iraqi commander, Mehdi Gharawi, executed four men and a 15-year-old boy. Whitson condemned the execution and emphasized the importance of "providing security for the population, not insecurity." In 2012 the Iraqi government was accused of harshly violating freedom of expression and assembly during 2011—including the intimidation and detention of both activists and journalists. Whitson denounced the government's crackdowns: "Iraq is quickly slipping back into authoritarianism as its security force abuse protesters, harass journalists and torture detainees. In 2014 Iraqi militants and forces were accused of attacking residential areas in the province of Anbar in an attempt to carry out assaults against Al-Qaeda. Whitson condemned the government's tactics and said that civilians are caught in the middle of the conflict: "The government urgently needs to deal with the threat from al-Qaeda, but killing their own citizens unlawfully is not the way."

In a May 2013 op-ed for The New York Times, Whitson criticized the Iraqi regime, arguing that "Maliki needs a new playbook – one with lessons on leadership and reform that will bring the country together on the basis of protecting every citizen's freedom, not tear it further apart."

=== Israel and the occupied Palestinian territories ===
In 2005 Whitson denounced the Palestinian government after Hamas attacked civilians using "Qassam" rockets and mortar attacks. Whitson stated that "Hamas has repeatedly failed to respect a fundamental rule of international humanitarian law" and emphasized that these are unlawful attacks. Human Rights Watch also criticized the Palestinian government in 2007 when Fatah and Hamas, the two rival political factions, were accused of mistreating civilians and executing them. Human Rights Watch stated that these executions are "an extremely grave offense—in fact, a war crime" and urged both Fatah and Hamas to be responsible for civilians in their custody.

Toward the end of 2012, Palestinian militants were accused of launching hundreds of rockets to urban centers in Israel. Whitson condemned these attacks as "unlawful" and stated that there is "no legal justification for launching rockets at populated areas." In 2012, human rights advocates Mahmud Abu Rahma and Yazan Sawafta were brutally beaten. Whitson criticized the Gaza government's inaction: "Hamas and the Palestinian Authority should not sit idly by while human rights defenders are being stabbed and beaten." In 2013, seven Palestinians who were suspected of collaborating with Israel were executed. The public executions sparked an outcry and Whitson criticized the government of Gaza for failing to investigate the executions, stating that "Hamas's inability or unwillingness to investigate the brazen murders of seven men makes a mockery of its claims that it's upholding the rule of law in Gaza." Whitson has persistently urged Obama to "tackle" prevalent human rights violations by leaders in both the Palestinian Territories and Israel, emphasizing that these problems "should not await a comprehensive settlement to the Israeli-Palestinian conflict."

In 2024, Whitson characterised Israeli Prime Minister Benjamin Netanyahu's assertions that protests at Columbia University and elsewhere were driven by antisemitism as "cheap & disingenuous [...] smears". Whitson has been accused frequently during her tenure at HRW of a bias against Israel. Martin Peretz of the New Republic has called her "a mendacious lady" who has "led a jaundiced crusade against Israel with the kind of laughable indiscretion that in better days would have put her on the margins of public debate." He has described her as having "an obsession with an evil Israel that faces no enemies but itself."

==== 2004-2006 ====
Not long after she began working at HRW in 2004, Whitson said, "The removal of settlers and most military forces will not end Israel's control over Gaza." She also stated that "Under international law, the test for determining whether an occupation exists is effective control by a hostile army, not the positioning of troops....Whether the Israeli army is inside Gaza or redeployed around its periphery and restricting entrance and exit, it remains in control."

Whitson claimed that Israel had intentionally killed civilians during the 2006 war in Lebanon.

In 2006, Whitson called on the US to cut aid to Israel in response to settlement expansion and accused Israel of attempting to exert power over Gaza through control of its borders, infrastructure, airspace, and movement of its residents: "Israel controls the airspace, Israel controls electricity, Israel controls water. In fact, just a few weeks ago, Israel decided and proclaimed that it was going to shut off the electricity supply to Gaza in order to punish the Gazans for the fact that militants in Gaza were continuing to launch Kassams directed towards Israel. Israel controls the borders and continues to decide who can come in and out of Gaza, even at the now so-called open Egypt-Gaza border. So in many ways, there are aspects of effective control that remain. And under international law, the key determinant is whether or not the other party retains effective control over the territory."

==== 2007-2009 ====
In a 2007 report, NGO Monitor accused HRW of a "clear, identifiable political bias in both the quality and quantity" of its coverage of Israel, and Whitson replied by accusing NGO Monitor of having an inadequate "understanding of international law." Israel, she said, "is the only country committing collective punishment by blockade because it is the only country that, directly and through its pressure on Egypt, is blocking all borders of a territory in order to squeeze its civilian population."

At a panel discussion under the auspices of The Century Foundation in July 2009, Whitson divided "the major human rights concerns in the Middle East" into two categories: one, "the general absence of basic human rights throughout the Arab world," and two, Israel's "occupation of territories" and its wars. She said that "Israel's wars in Lebanon and Gaza have...been a source of very serious violations of international humanitarian law, amounting in numerous incidents, to war crimes."

David Bernstein noted in a 2009 commentary that the ADC, of which Whitson was director before joining HRW, "support[s] the Arab and Palestinian cause against Israel, and during the Second Intifada, when Whitson was active in ACD-NY, the chapter "organized a silent vigil outside St. Patrick's Cathedral to draw attention to the fact that Palestinian Christians are also suffering under Israeli occupation." David Bernstein did not know "whether she resigned her position when she started working for Human Rights Watch; if she didn't, it was a clear conflict of interest."

In another 2009 article, Bernstein suggested that if HRW wished to restore its credibility, it needed to fire certain staffers, Whitson among them, and replace them with "some sincere human rights advocates without anti-Israel ideological priors." If HRW wishes to "continue to preach to the leftist, anti-Israel choir, Bernstein wrote, "it shouldn't expect anyone else to pay attention."

In an interview posted on YouTube in 2009, Whitson claimed that Israel had illegally used white phosphorus against Palestinian civilians in the Gaza Strip. This charge was disputed by Peter Herby of the International Committee of the Red Cross.

Whitson condemned Israel in a 2009 article for approving settlements in the Palestinian territories. Questioning "why such a system of racial inequality remains in place in the Occupied Palestinian Territories," she accused the Israeli government of providing "Jewish settlements with water, electricity, housing, schools, hospitals and roads, while it severely restricts access to these necessities to Palestinian communities under its control." She insisted that Israel's "security concerns do not warrant treating every last Palestinian man, woman and child as a threat" or "systematically separating Palestinians from Jews, with shanties and dirt roads provided for the one, and spacious villas with swimming pools and paved highways provided for the other." And she criticized both the EU and the US for "support[ing] the system" through trade and aid.

==== 2010-2013 ====
In an April 2010 interview, Whitson said that "the most glaring violations of the laws of war continues to be Israel's 43 year occupation of the Palestinian territories," but also claimed that it was "very important" for HRW "not to take a position on who's right or who's wrong" in order to maintain its credibility as "non-partisan in any conflict."

Ben Birnbaum, a journalist who profiled Whitson for The New Republic in 2010, noted that her office is decorated by "a poster for Paradise Now, a movie that attempts to humanize Palestinian suicide bombers," and "two photos of bereaved Gazans." On the Israeli-Palestine conflict, Birnbaum wrote, her "allegiances seem clear." He quoted one insider as saying that Whitson "definitely has no sympathy for the Israeli side" but has "a lot of personal identification with the Palestinian cause." She has expressed "tremendous respect and admiration" for Norman Finkelstein, and while lamenting that "his anger sometimes gets the better of him and his brilliant mind and generous spirit," she has excused it by saying that "making Israeli abuses the focus of one's life work is a thankless but courageous task that may well end up leaving all of us quite bitter."

NGO Monitor accused HRW in 2012 of having exhibited an "obsessive focus on Israel" during Whitson's tenure, complaining that "despite the extensive use of genocidal threats by the Iranian regime, HRW has not found the time or resources to condemn this and other forms of hate speech." NGO Monitor noted that in 2010, "HRW issued 19 largely minor documents on Libya, compared with 51 on 'Israel and the Occupied Territories.'"

During the November 2012 conflict in Gaza, Whitson accused Israel of "violating the law of war" by targeting journalists and TV stations. In response to IDF insistence that it had acted "in accordance with the laws of armed conflict, despite the ongoing deliberate violations and abuse of these laws by the terrorist organizations in the Gaza Strip," Whitson maintained: "Just because Israel says a journalist was a fighter or a TV station was a command center does not make it so." Gerald Steinberg of NGO Monitor criticised Whitson for what he called unsubstantiated allegations. "The organization presents no proof whatsoever that the targets involved were not being used for military operations or that the 'journalists' were not Hamas and Islamic Jihad fighters," said Anne Herzberg of NGO Monitor, adding: "Just because HRW claims something is a war crime does not make it so." Whitson, in a separate statement on the same matter, said that "journalists who praise Hamas and TV stations that applaud attacks on Israel may be propagandists, but that does not make them legitimate targets under the laws of war."

Benjamin Weinthal, from the Jerusalem Post has criticized Whitson for praising "anti-Israel activist Norman Finkelstein, who equates Israel with Nazi Germany."

In November 2012 Whitson argued that rocket attacks in populated areas constituted war crimes against Israeli civilians. In April 2013 she criticized the Hamas government in Gaza for failing to "investigate and prosecute the men who tortured and executed suspected collaborators without due process," saying that "the brazen murders of seven men makes a mockery of its claims that it's upholding the rule of law in Gaza."

=== Jordan ===
In 2008, the Jordanian government drafted two new laws that threatened democracy. These laws expanded the government's control over operating and funding NGOs and restricted the right of congregation and assembly for Jordanians. Whitson criticized the Jordanian government and stated that the aforementioned draft laws "show Jordan's intolerance for critical debate in democracy." In 2008 the Jordanian government was also accused of committing torture and violence in jails. Whitson condemned the Jordanian government, and cited that torture in Jordanian prisons is the norm "even two years after King Abdullah II called for reforms to stop it once and for all." In 2010, prosecutors charged two leaders of the Committee of Day Laborers for publicly protesting their dismissal, citing that citizens have "the right to protest their government"—especially when the government is their employer. In mid-2013 Jordanian authorities censored over 260 unlicensed local news websites. Whitson commented on the issue, stating that it is a violation of freedom of expression and a "clear attempt to restrict independent reporting in Jordan." Further, in 2013 a court in Jordan charged two intellectuals with "disturbing foreign relations creating racist strife. Whitson condemned the charges and noted that Jordan's calls for democratic reforms ring "hollow while prosecutors hunt down public figures simply for criticizing the government's foreign policy."

=== Kuwait ===
In January 2010, the government of Kuwait initiated crackdowns on freedom of expression and assembly. Such crackdowns included the use of violent force and the restriction of public gatherings. Whitson condemned the Kuwaiti government's violation of freedom of expression and revealed that the government has grown "more and comfortable harassing Kuwaitis who dared to criticize the government." In January 2012, police in Kuwait used tear gas and batons in order to crack down on bidoon demonstrators that were calling for citizenship and other basic rights. Following violent clashes, Whitson released a statement condemning the Kuwaiti government's use of excessive force, citing that the government's crackdowns are "a shameful effort to curb the rights to peaceful expression and assembly of Kuwait's bidoons." In April 2013, a court in Kuwait sentenced a politician from the opposition to five years in prison after he insulted the Emir of Kuwait. The ruling sparked outrage in the region and Whitson echoed similar sentiments in an interview with The New York Times. She stated that the sentencing reflected "dangerous backsliding in Kuwait, stifling the country's lively and relatively free political debates, in a whole series of jail sentences against activists and politicians alike".

=== Lebanon ===
In 2006 Whitson published an article in Asharq Al-Awsat criticizing Hezbollah for its attacks against Israel, stating that many rockets have been "indiscriminately launched into civilian areas." She also urged the UN Human Rights Council to hold Hezbollah accountable for their crimes. When Hezbollah and the Lebanese government reacted negatively to HRW criticism, Whitson called out the Lebanese government for "loving" HRW reports when they were critical of Israel, but slamming HRW reports that were critical of Lebanon and Hezbollah's actions. In 2007 Whitson also condemned both Lebanon and Israel for failing to investigate human rights violations during the Israel-Hezbollah war. Whitson noted that "both sides in this conflict violated the laws of war, but a full year later, no one has been held accountable." In the election year of 2009, Whitson criticized Lebanon's parties and candidates running for parliament for generally ignoring human rights issues, such torture in detention, discrimination against women and Palestinian refugees. The civil war in Syria was well underway in 2012 when Whitson wrote a letter to Lebanon's Prime Minister and other officials, asking them to reassess the deportation of at-risk Syrians. In the letter, Whitson wrote that despite Lebanon's commitments it is still "obligated to not forcibly return anyone who says they fear persecution."

=== Libya ===
Libya is "teetering on the brink of failure," said Whitson to MSNBC in 2014, as the country has been "unable to disarm dozens of armed groups" that terrorize, kidnap, and commit murder. Shortly after the Arab Spring, Whitson, criticized Libya's transitional government for "mimicking Qaddafi laws criminalizing political dissent and granting blanket immunity to any crimes committed in "support" of the revolution" in a Foreign Policy op-ed. In 2009, she called on Gaddafi, the then-dictator, to wipe out repressive laws and free political prisoners.

==== 2011 ====
Commenting on a 2011 interview with Whitson about Libya on NPR, Hugh Fitzgerald wrote: "Even with the few instances of live video feed we see coming from protests in Libya, the crowd's shouted mantra is, 'Allahu Akbar!' I don't think self-appointed Middle-East Experts such as Ms. Whitson would notice the signs of overt religious motivation, and if they did notice it, I think they would make a conscious effort not to report it. She didn't mention the role of Islam in the protests of Bahrain or Libya ([n]or[,] one assumes, would she have in Egypt if asked)."

In a Los Angeles Times op-ed published in February 2011, weeks after the rebellion against the Libyan regime had intensified, Whitson stated that Muammar Gaddafi's son Seif Islam Gaddafi had been "primarily responsible for persuading officials" to let HRW hold a news conference in Libya. Whitson described the younger Gaddafi as having been a "semi-sanctioned internal voice for reform" whose foundation "had pushed publicly for changing the country's laws and freeing political prisoners" and "helped establish two private newspapers that sometimes criticized government policies." She added that she and others at HRW had "had a sense that, with Seif Islam's support, some genuine political liberalization was possible and civil society might be able to breathe more freely" in Libya. Yet now, she lamented, "Seif Islam, who might have led Libyans to a peaceful transition, has become an advocate for policies leading to their deaths." She acknowledged that there had in fact been "no progress on any institutional or legal reforms" in Libya, and that, indeed, "most Libyans we spoke with never had much faith that Moammar Qaddafi would learn new tricks, or that the announced reforms were anything more than an endless loop of promises made and broken."

Jeffrey Goldberg of The Atlantic harshly criticized Whitson's Los Angeles Times op-ed, suggesting that perhaps she "should work for Vogue," a reference to that magazine's recent publication of a flattering profile of the Syrian First Lady. He accused Whitson of having "something of a soft spot for the lunatic Libyan and his dangerous son" and quoted from what he described as an "intermittently starry-eyed portrayal of life in Libya" written by Whitson.

==== 2012 ====
In May 2012 Whitson, having altered her assessment of Libya entirely, upbraided its interim government for "rejecting international human rights monitoring and the ICC's jurisdiction" as well as for passing "some shockingly bad laws, mimicking Qaddafi laws criminalizing political dissent and granting blanket immunity to any crimes committed in 'support' of the revolution." Apropos of Whitson's Los Angeles Times oped, Benjamin Weinthal wrote in the Jerusalem Post that she had "backtracked...regarding her longstanding praise of al-Islam." Noting NGO Monitor's call for Whitson's resignation, and Steinberg's statement that "What Sarah Leah Whitson admits she knew about the Qaddafi family's fraudulent reform agenda completely contradicts statements during her Tripoli trip," Weinthal said that "Whitson's actions are certainly puzzling. If Libyans had expressed doubt that Qaddafi would ever make good on his promises, why had she implied that the regime was open to reforms in the past? And further, why has HRW published only six major reports on Libya since 1991? Was the organization simply apathetic about Libya? Was it unable to access enough data to issue accurate reports? Or was it deliberately misrepresenting the Qaddafi regime for some reason or another?"

==== 2013 ====
Writing in Middle East Quarterly in Summer 2013, Gerald M. Steinberg noted an October 2011 statement by HRW "condemning Western governments for their 'apparent eagerness to embrace Qaddafi because of his support on counterterrorism, as well as lucrative business opportunities' that, according to HRW, 'tempered their criticism of his human rights record in recent years.'" Steinberg complained that "[w]hat this statement conspicuously failed to note is that HRW had been an active participant in this eager embrace of the Qaddafi regime." Calling HRW "a financially flush but morally bankrupt organization," Steinberg charged that its "behavior with regard to the Middle East demonstrates a determined effort to avert its eyes from the worst human rights abuses while focusing on post-colonial ideologues' favorite whipping boy, Israel—the only democracy in the region."

=== Morocco ===
In August 2011, when dissident Abdelkrim Mouti' was refused a Moroccan passport and forced into political exile, Whitson criticized the Moroccan government and stated that all Moroccans have "the right to passport and to return to his homeland." In late 2011, Moroccan authorities began harassing people that planned on boycotting the November 2011 parliamentary elections. Whitson condemned these harassments and noted that the "right to freely choose and campaign" for a particular representative in government also includes the right not to vote. In 2012 a Moroccan rapper was charged with insulting public officials and condemning corruption in a song. Whitson criticized the imprisonment of the rapper and stated that each day that Belghoat, the rapper, spends in prison is a "reminder of the distance between Morocco's laws and practices… " In mid-2013, Human Rights Watch accused courts in Morocco of convicting defendants with confessions that were taken through torture and coercion. Whitson denounced the Moroccan judicial system, stating that it leads defendants "on an express train to a guilty verdict." In 2014, Whitson also criticized the Moroccan government for failing to deliver human rights improvements, initiating unfair trials, and using police violence. Whitson compared Morocco to a "vast construction site" in which authorities make grand plans but fail to finish "the foundation."

=== Saudi Arabia ===
In 2009, Whitson denounced the Saudi Arabian government for failing to deliver on their promises to secure women's rights, criticizing its guardianship system which requires women to get permission from their husband, father, or another male to work, go to school, and even have certain medical procedures. Whitson stated that the government is "saying one thing to the Human Rights Council in Geneva but doing another thing inside the kingdom…It needs to stop requiring adult women to seek permission from men, not just pretend to stop it." In 2012, Whitson criticized the Saudi government after they arrested and set travel bans against members of the political opposition. Whitson commented that the government is unjustly punishing those "who dare to demand democracy and human rights reform" and urged Saudi authorities to respect citizens' basic rights. In mid-2013, Saudi Arabia was condemned for sentencing two Saudi women's rights activists, Wajeha al-Huwaider and Fawzia al-Oyouni, to 10 months in prison with a two-year travel ban for their involvement with Natalie Morin —a Canadian citizen who was being abused by her Saudi Arabian husband. Human Rights Watch condemned Saudi Arabian authorities for their conviction of al-Huwaider and al-Oyouni and criticized the government for its gender-biased laws and its failure to protect women like Natalie Morin. In 2014 Saudi authorities sentenced two citizens without charge on accusations of abandoning the Sunni sect of Islam. The two men charged, who had adopted the Ahmadiyya sect of Islam, were detained for two years without charge. Whitson criticized the Saudi government for interfering with the defendants' beliefs and for leaving them "sitting in jail for two years in legal limbo with no end sign"—noting the government's unjust repression against religious dissidents. In 2014 Whitson urged President Obama to raise the issue of human rights with King Abdullah. She noted that Obama should discuss "the new counterterrorism law, women's rights, and mass deportation."

==== Fundraiser ====
Reporting in May 2009 on a dinner given in Riyadh to host Whitson and other HRW officials, the Saudi Press indicated that HRW had "presented a documentary and spoke on the report they compiled on Israel violating human rights and international law during its war on Gaza earlier this year" and quoted Whitson as telling the Saudi audience that HRW had "provided the international community with evidence of Israel using white phosphorus and launching systematic destructive attacks on civilian targets. Pro-Israel pressure groups in the US, the European Union and the United Nations have strongly resisted the report and tried to discredit it."

Citing that dinner, which was an effort to raise funds, NGO Monitor accused Whitson of "exploiting the specter of 'pro-Israel pressure groups' to solicit funds from 'prominent members of Saudi society.'" David Bernstein, a law professor at George Mason University, also criticized the Saudi Arabia fundraiser, expressing concern in The Wall Street Journal that Whitson had gone to Saudi Arabia not to study that country's abuse of women, its death penalty for homosexuality, or its lack of religious freedom, but "to raise money from wealthy Saudis by highlighting HRW's demonization of Israel." Bernstein accused HRW of seeking "to raise money from wealthy Saudis by highlighting HRW's demonization of Israel." Noting that Whitson had "found no time to criticize Saudi Arabia's abysmal human rights record," Bernstein argued that "there is something wrong when a human rights organization goes to one of the worst countries in the world for human rights to raise money to wage lawfare against Israel, and says not a word during the trip about the status of human rights in that country." HRW, Bernstein stated flatly, should not "raise money in a totalitarian country" such as Saudi Arabia.

Responding to Bernstein's Wall Street Journal article, Whitson wrote "believe it or not, some Arabs believe in human rights too." Bernstein protested in reply that "NOTHING in my piece suggested or implied that no Arabs believe in human rights, or, for that matter, that Arabs are inherently less likely to believe in human rights than anyone else."

After attending a 2009 videotaped presentation by Whitson in New York about human rights in the Middle East, Bernstein wrote that she had spent "approximately three minutes and thirty-five seconds describing Israel's alleged violations of international law and human rights" in an extremely "tendentious" manner, accusing Israel of apartheid and war crimes and calling the wars in Lebanon and Gaza "Israel's wars," and then spent "approximately twelve seconds on Hamas and Hezbollah." Noting that "this was a speech to an American audience," Bernstein commented: "God knows what she said in Saudi Arabia. And God knows what she thinks privately, as opposed to what she reveals publicly."

Jeffrey Goldberg of The Atlantic complained that Whitson had sought "to raise funds from Saudis, including a member of the Consultative Assembly of Saudi Arabia#Shura Council (which oversees, on behalf of the Saudi monarchy, the imposition in the Kingdom of the strict Wahhabi interpretation of Islamic law) in part by highlighting her organization's investigations of Israel, and its war with Israel's 'supporters,' who are liars and deceivers." He suggested that "Human Rights Watch, in the pursuit of dollars, has compromised its integrity." Apropos of Whitson's reported reference at her Saudi Arabian fundraiser to the "pro-Israel lobby," Goldberg expressed alarm that "Whitson, if the allegation against her is to be believed, trafficked in a toxic stereotype about Jews in a country that bans most Jews from even crossing its borders....The term pro-Israel lobby, of course, means something very different on the Arabian peninsula than it does here....In much of the Arab world, 'pro-Israel pressure group' suggests a global conspiracy by Jews to dominate the world politically, culturally and economically."

HRW called these allegations false and unsubstantiated. According to HRW, the organization has never tried to raise funds from any government or government official, including any member of the Saudi Shura Council, and HRW never described a "war with Israel's supporters" or used the words "liars and deceivers" at any point. HRW noted that staffers had made two presentations in Saudi Arabia in May 2009. Among an estimated 50 guests at a reception in Riyadh, three had governmental affiliations, "the spokesperson for the Ministry of Interior; the deputy head of the Human Rights Commission, a governmental organization; and a member of the Shura Council, a government-appointed consultative body." According to HRW, none of those individuals were solicited for funds and HRW never accepts funds from government officials in any country. HRW stated that there is no reason why Saudi citizens cannot legitimately want to support human rights.

Whitson also maintained that "Human Rights Watch in recent years has published more reports and press releases on a variety of rights problems in Saudi Arabia than any other human rights organization in the world." She rejected the notion "that efforts to raise support among Saudis are unseemly because, well, if they live in a totalitarian country, they must be bad people too," saying that "Human Rights Watch accepts funding from private individuals and foundations the world over, which we never allow to affect the independence of our work....Believe it or not, some Arabs believe in human rights too." Whitson characterized David Bernstein's criticism of her Saudi Arabia fundraiser as "fundamentally...racist," saying that donors' "ethnic background...is irrelevant....Should people be criticising us for the fact that much of our support base is made up of Jews?" In response, David Bernstein accused Whitson of "play[ing] the racism card" and said that her racism accusation "just shows how low Whitson will go, and how desperate she has become." He said that "her claim that the issue I raised is the 'ethnic background' of HRW's donors is egregiously dishonest." The problem, he argued, was that "HRW went to the elites of a totalitarian nation, with some representatives of the government in the audience (!) to ask for money to help it combat the controversial policies of a liberal democracy."

Bernstein further charged that Whitson would not "release a video or transcript of her remarks at the Saudi fundraising dinner." He also criticized the fact that Whitson "as the representative of an allegedly non-partisan human rights group...hires Palestinian political activists with a long record of hostility to Israel as her 'neutral' researchers." Nor, he complained, had Whitson ever "acknowledged Human Rights Watch's various errors in its reporting on Israel."

Daniel Levy, an Israeli political analyst, argued that "To accuse Whitson of being soft on the Saudis or somehow singling out Israel for criticism is quite astonishing....these attacks on HRW demonstrate no such objectivity or credibility -- they come from a narrow and misguided right-wing Israel advocacy agenda." While Whitson did not criticize Saudi Arabia at her fundraiser there, argued Levy, she did criticize it at an event in the U.S. a few days earlier, saying for example that when it came to women's rights, "Saudi Arabia is the absolute worst." Levy claimed that the attacks on Whitson were being made by people who do not want to see Israel criticized.

Law professor Abraham Bell criticized Whitson in a March 2012 article for emphasizing HRW's clashes with "pro-Israel pressure groups in the US, the European Union, and the United Nations" when courting potential donors in Saudi Arabia.

=== Syria ===
In 2008 Whitson criticized the Syrian government for its harsh sentences against a dozen democracy advocates. Whitson labeled the sentencing a "transparent bid to silence its [the governments] critics" and called on President Bashar Al Assad to "quash" the convictions. Following the lead of protesters in Tunisia, Egypt, and Libya, massive anti-government demonstrations swept parts of Syria in the Arab Spring of 2011. Syria's government responded harshly, and in 2011, Whitson criticized the Syrian government for transferring hundreds of detainees to "off the grid" military sites that were away from international monitors. Whitson stated that Syria "will stop at nothing to undermine independent monitoring of its crackdown."

Following a violent offensive against al-Qusayr province in Syria, many residents were forced to flee the area in search of safety, but some were prevented from doing so. Whitson condemned Syrian government forces and militia for not providing a safe path for civilians who wished to flee. She stated that "any forces that block civilians from leaving al-Qusayr are committing serious violations of the laws of war." In 2013, Whitson denounced the Syrian government for not allowing humanitarian aid to enter the country's borders. Whitson stated that "thousands of Syrians face horrendous living conditions because aid is not simply reaching them. A simple word from the Syrian government could make reaching those in need much easier." In 2013 Whitson also criticized opposition fighters in Syria for executing civilians in an offensive on a Christian village. Whitson revealed that opposition groups claimed they would not harm civilians "But they did just that. There is no excuse for indiscriminate or targeted attacks against civilians or civilian sites." In 2014, Whitson also condemned the Syrian government for its air attacks against Aleppo. She stated that "use of barrel bombs in residential neighborhoods has done the expected: killed hundreds of civilians and driven thousands from their homes." In 2014 Human Rights Watch stated that there is strong evidence that chemical weapons were used in Syria; the organization condemned Syrian authorities for their violation of international law and urged the UN Security Council to refer Syria's situation to the International Criminal Court.

=== Tunisia ===
In 2009 Whitson criticized the Tunisian government after they jailed two journalists following unfair trials. Whitson condemned Ben Ali and stated that he is on "a vengeful campaign to punish the few journalists and human rights activists who dared to question his record during the election." In early 2010, the Tunisian government was accused of violating freedom of expression against journalists and assaulting them. Whitson condemned the Tunisian government and its "intolerance for human rights" and called upon the government to respect freedom of the press. In 2010, Whitson also criticized the Tunisian government after they banned journalists from attending a meeting where Human Rights Watch was due to release a report critical of the government. She stated that the government's attempt to ban journalists from attending marks a "lack of respect for free speech." Tunisia was the first Middle East/North African country [AB1] where demonstrators flooded the streets in late 2010 and early 2011, igniting the Arab Spring uprisings across the region. During the 2011 uprising, Whitson condemned the government for its use of excessive force against protestors. Whitson urged the government to take steps toward change, including "allowing citizens to exercise their rights peacefully, and freeing political prisoners." After the 2011 uprising, Whitson condemned the government for failing to provide urgent medical care for victims of police violence from the 2010-2011 demonstrations. Whitson urged the government to "waste no more time" in providing victims with the care they need.

=== United Arab Emirates ===
"In the year of the Arab Spring, the UAE headed in the opposite direction by criminally prosecuting Emiratis who dared to criticize the government," stated Whitson in early 2012 when the UAE government was accused of violating free speech, arresting, and harassing civilians. In 2012 Whitson also condemned the UAE government after they retracted residency permits of dozens of Syrians who stood before the Syrian embassy in Dubai to protest the Syrian government. Whitson noted that these expulsions prove that Emiriati authorities are "intolerant" of any demonstrations or protests on UAE soil—even when it is not directly targeting the UAE government. Whitson also criticized the government of UAE when they detained Ahmed Abd Al-Khaleq, a UAE blogger, and threatened him with deportation. At the time, Whitson urged the UAE to "immediately halt any deportation proceedings" against Al-Khaleq and release him. In late 2012, Whitson wrote an op-ed in the Huffington Post in which she criticized the UAE government and referred to it as a country "where people who attempt to exercise their rights to free speech and peaceful dissent are likely to find themselves in arbitrary detention." In 2013 Human Rights Watch commented on the "backsliding" human rights situation in the UAE. Whitson revealed that if the government continues to violate "basic human rights and core international prohibitions, it will do major damage to its reputation." Due to Whitson continuous criticisms against the UAE, she was denied entry to the country on January 24, 2014. Kenneth Roth, the executive director at Human Rights Watch, denounced the UAE government for its actions and viewed the refusal of entry and the cancellation of a Human Rights Watch news conference as "petty tactics by the UAE authorities to muzzle Human Rights Watch."

=== Yemen ===
During the 2011 uprising in Yemen, journalists that covered antigovernment movements claimed that they were being attacked by advocates of former President Ali Abdullah Saleh. Whitson criticized the government and stated that "beating up journalists is a blatant attempt by the authorities to prevent the Yemeni people and the world from witnessing a critical moment in Yemen." Additionally, she called upon Yemeni authorities to stop these unjust attacks and hold assailants and security officials accountable for their actions. In an interview with Democracy Now!, Whitson also emphasized the importance of protestors' right to demonstrate against the Yemeni government and further criticized the use of tasers, knives, and rifles as a tool to silence anti-government protests.

Following Yemen's Arab Spring, Whitson continued to criticize the transitional government, headed by President Abdu Rabu Mansour Hadi, for its failure to address previous human rights violations enacted by the former government: "the government needs to address the past, both to provide justice for the victims and to make sure the abuses stop once and for all." Whitson also highlighted that two years after the uprising, Hadi's administration continues to neglect calls for justice from those impacted by the former government. In late January 2014 the National Dialogue Conference, a 565-member conference that aims to establish a foundation for a "New Yemen," drew to a close. Whitson noted that Yemen's future "may face obstacles" but also praised the conclusion of the National Dialogue Conference as an "achievement."

== Membership ==
Whitson is a member of the Council on Foreign Relations.

== Personal life ==
Whitson is married to Josh Zinner, co-director of Neighborhood Economic Development Advocacy Project in New York City. They have three children.

== See also ==
- List of Harvard Law School alumni
- List of University of California, Berkeley alumni
