= Brigitte Perenyi =

Ghanaian documentary producer

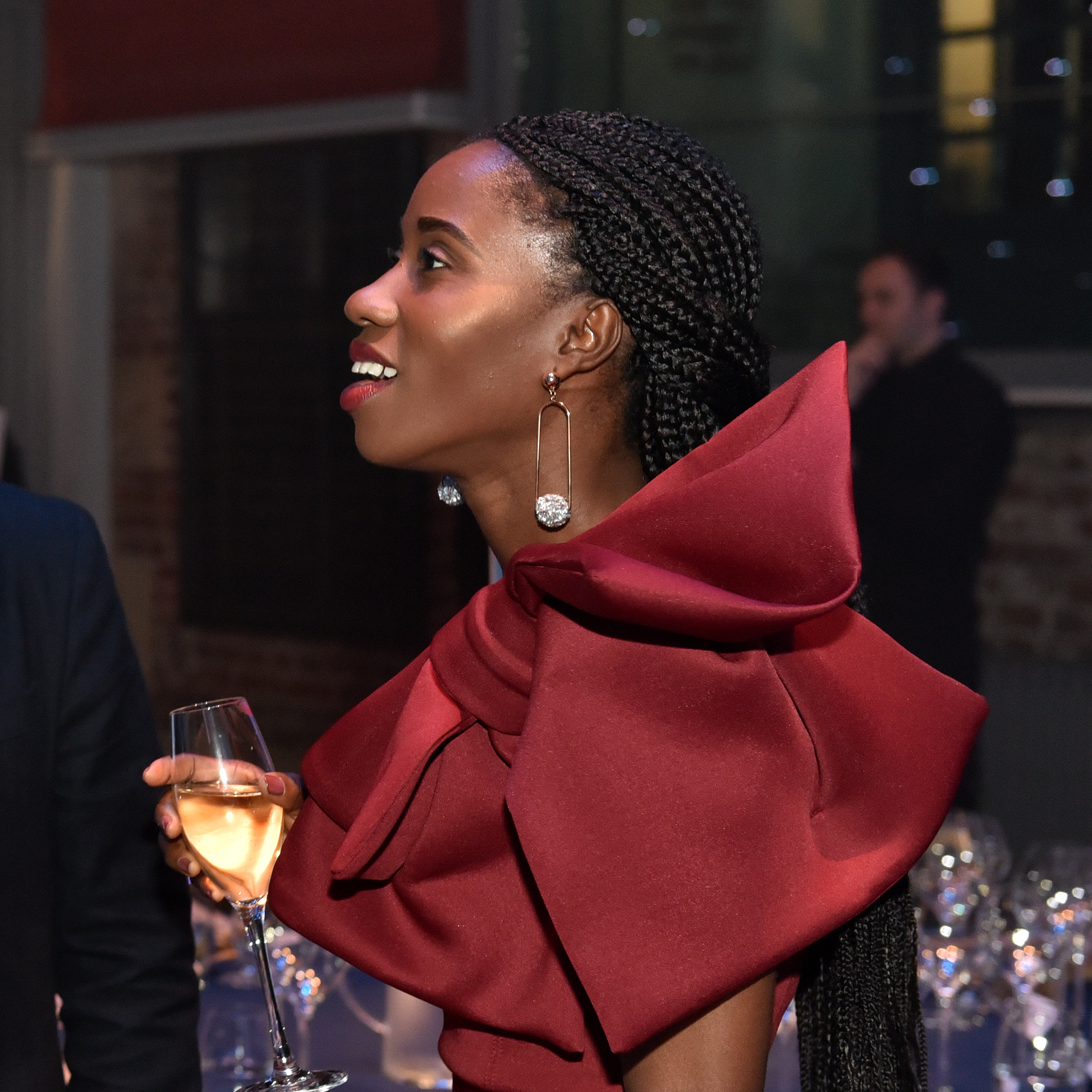
- in 2018
- Born: Brigitte Sossou Perenyi; 1990 (age 35–36); Togo
- Occupation: Documentary producer

Brigitte Sossou Perenyi (born in Togo in 1990) is a Ghanaian documentary producer. She lived under conditions of slavery after being kidnapped at the age of seven and sent to Ghanaian sanctuary where Trokosi, or wife of the gods, was a secular practice that sends young women to forced labor to redeem the sins of their relatives. She was adopted by an American art forger and as an adult she returned to Ghana to see the charity that helped her, the Ghanaian family who looked after her and her birth family in Togo. Stories of her life have won awards and in 2018 she was chosen as one of the BBC's 100 Women.

== Life ==
She was born in Togo in 1990. She was the fifth of six children.

When she was seven-years-old, her mother sent her to stay with her uncle in, Lome, the capital of Togo where she would be able to go to school. Brigitte was kidnapped by her uncle and taken to a Ghanaian sanctuary to pay for the adultery crime committed by her uncle, according to the Trojan tradition. The priests would wake her at five. She didn't understand the language but she would sweep and clean before doing work on a farm for the rest of the day. She was not sexually abused but she was not given an education. This practice had survived for more than 300 years and was finally made illegal in Ghana in 1998, although it has continued and no priest has ever been tried. Communities in Ghana, Benin, and Togo continued to practice Trokosi illegally. The year in which Brigitte entered the sanctuary, the country had 5,000 women and girls in Trokosi .

In 1997, the 60-minute US program of the CBS chain showed the world the conditions in which Brigitte lived through a documentary titled My Stolen Childhood. With the help of the NGO International Needs which was started by Juliana Dogbadzi, Kenneth Perenyi decided to go to Ghana in order to release her. Perenyi had made a fortune from forging paintings and was under investigation by the FBI. Nevertheless, he arranged for her to be released and she was sent to stay initially with the Ghanaian Sabaa family to learn English and to normalise her situation for about two years. In 1999, Kenneth Perenyi adopted and took her to the United States, where they had a difficult time together as Brigitte was angry and Kenneth was worried that he might be arrested for previous forgeries. They spent the next 13 years together. About 20 years after being released, Brigitte returned to Togo to meet her biological family. On this trip, she documented her story with the BBC, in order to denounce trokosi practice.

She returned to Ghana when she was 21 to do an internship in Accra. She was supported again by the International Needs charity. She visited the Sabaa family and they suggested that she should find her birth family in Togo. She was reunited with her four brothers, her birth parents, and a brother born after she left. Communication was not easy as she had forgotten her first language, but she learned that her parents had never known that her uncle had taken her to Ghana. Her uncle had refused to say where she was, and they thought that she was dead. She had previously thought they were complicit with her ill treatment and was now able to forgive them.

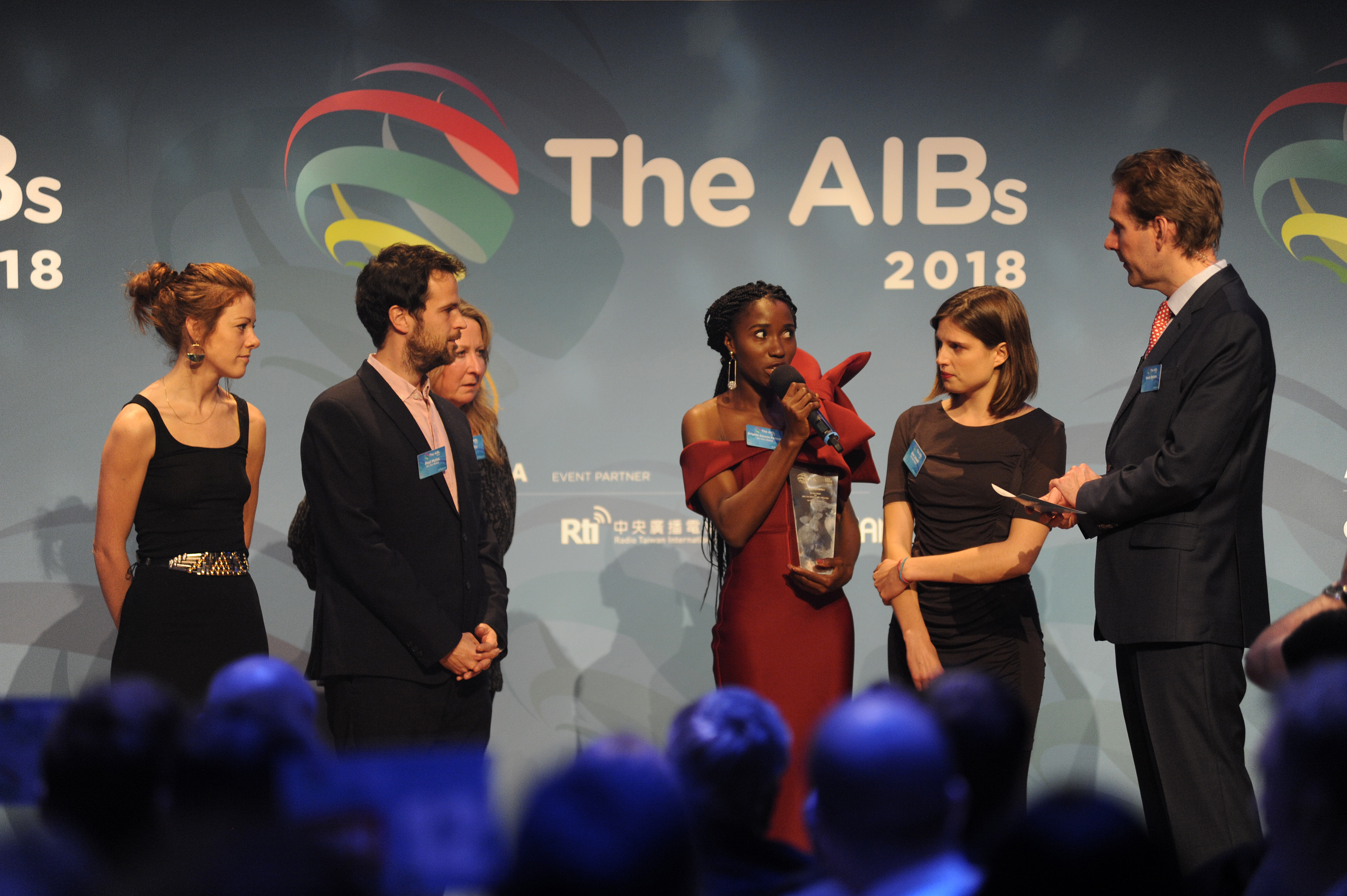
Brigitte Sossou Perenyi seeing "My Stolen Childhood" received a AIB award in 2018

She took a second trip three years later to write her story for Marie Claire magazine. In 2017 she returned again to Togo accompanied by a film crew funded by the European Journalism Centre and Code4Africa. She found the process empowering. The film was edited by the BBC and resulted in a programme. In the following year, she was listed in 100 Women BBC 2018. This list by the BBC brings together the 100 most influential women of the year. She has said that her Christian faith which she gained with the Sabaa family has enable her to forgive her uncle and herself.

By 2017 her American foster father, Kenneth Perengi, was now settled, he was not prosecuted and his forgeries were sold so far in the past that the law no longer applied. He continued to make a living from copies, rather than forgeries, and he wrote his autobiography without mentioning the rescue he was involved in.

In 2021 Brigitte was working as an associate producer with others creating African documentaries for Westerners and Africans.
