= Martin O'Brien (humanitarian) =

Martin O’Brien (born in Belfast, Northern Ireland in October 1964) is a human rights activist and charity administrator in Northern Ireland. He has worked for over 40 years in the peace and human rights movement in Northern Ireland. Since 2015, O'Brien has been the director of the Social Change Initiative, an international not-for-profit organisation based in Belfast, Northern Ireland, that supports activists and funders globally to secure progressive change, while also working to cement peace in Northern Ireland. Prior to joining SCI, Martin worked for 11 years at the Atlantic Philanthropies, where he led the planning process for the conclusion of Atlantic’s programmatic grant making which worked to bring about lasting changes in the lives of disadvantaged and vulnerable people globally. In 2011, O'Brien was appointed Senior Vice-President of Programmes at Atlantic with responsibility for global grant making programmes on Health, Ageing, Children and Youth, and Reconciliation and Human Rights.

Prior to joining Atlantic Philanthropies, O’Brien worked for 17 years co-ordinating the work of the Committee on the Administration of Justice (CAJ), an organisation dedicated to securing the highest standards in the administration of justice in Northern Ireland. As executive director of the CAJ, O'Brien helped to secure strong human rights provisions in the 1998 Good Friday Peace Agreement supported by most parties, that set forth a timetable and a structure to create a new power-sharing government in Northern Ireland. It was during O’Brien’s tenure in 1998 that the CAJ was awarded the prestigious Council of Europe Human Rights Prize in recognition of its contribution to protecting and promoting human rights in Northern Ireland.

O’Brien has written, spoken and publicly campaigned on a wide range of civil liberties issues. He has brought concerns about the abuse of human rights in NI to international audiences, including the United Nations.

O’Brien received his degree in Sociology and Social Administration from Queen's University Belfast in 1987. In 1996, he was awarded a Master's degree in human rights law. In May 1999, Notre Dame College presented him with an honorary Doctorate in recognition of his work to promote justice and peace in Northern Ireland.

O'Brien is the cofounder of several organisations, including Youth for Peace; the Irish Network for Nonviolent Action Training and Education (INNATE); and Kilcranny House, a rural education centre committed to healing the divisions which exist in Northern Ireland.

O’Brien was one of four recipients of the Reebok Human Rights Award in 1992 in recognition of his contribution to the protection of human rights. His work has also been honoured by Human Rights Watch, which selected him as one of 12 international human rights monitors for 1992 and by the Lawyers Committee for Human Rights (now Human Rights First).
