= Martin O'Brien (footballer) =

Australian rules footballer

Personal information
- Full name: Martin O'Brien
- Born: 16 October 1875; North Melbourne, Victoria
- Died: 17 November 1946 (aged 71); South Melbourne, Victoria

Playing career^{1}
Years	Club	Games (Goals)
1903	St Kilda	3 (0)
- ^{1} Playing statistics correct to the end of 1903.

Martin O'Brien (16 October 1875 – 17 November 1946) was an Australian rules footballer who played with St Kilda in the Victorian Football League (VFL).
