= Centre for Ageing Research and Development in Ireland =

The Centre for Ageing Research and Development in Ireland (CARDI) is a non-profit organisation developed by leaders from the gerontology field across Ireland with support from The Atlantic Philanthropies.

== Organisation ==
CARDI was founded to help promote research into ageing and to encourage cooperation across sectors and disciplines on the topic of ageing and older people in Ireland. It communicates and disseminates ageing research as well as running a research project grants programme. To date it has funded 25 grants projects across Ireland, North and South. Research published includes reports on inappropriate prescribing for older people in long term care and pensions and the recession, ageing in rural areas, the use of video technology for falls prevention.

== Ageing in Ireland ==
According to the latest data from the CSO there are just over 535,000 people aged 65 or over living in the Republic of Ireland. In Northern Ireland there are 249,000 people this age and older. Looking to the future a large increase is expected in the number of older people on both parts of the island. It is now predicted that by 2041 there will be 1.89 million people over 65 living on the island This means that ageing is becoming a major issue for all of use and especially for those who make policy and provide services for older people.

== Ageing Population ==
- At the ROI 2011 census, there were 0.54 million aged 65+, 11.8% (Central Statistics Office, 2012).
- In Northern Ireland (NI) the older population has grown even more rapidly. In 1961, there was a population of 144,500 of people aged 65 and over. In 2011, the population was 271,500 aged 65+, 15% of the population .
- By 2041, there will be 1.4 million in ROI aged 65 and over, three times more than the older population now. This older group will make up 22% of the total population, compared to 11% of the population in 2006 .
- In NI, in 2041 the 65+ population is projected to make up 24% of the population, compared with less than 14% now .
- The number of very old people is a crucial feature of the ageing populations in the ROI and NI. By 2041, the number of people aged 75 and over is projected to reach almost 1 million by 2041 on the island of Ireland. The number of 85+ year olds is predicted to rise from 74,000 in 2006 to 356,000 in 2041 on the island of Ireland .

== Life expectancy and health ==
- Life expectancy at birth in the ROI (2005-2007) is 76.8 years for men and 81.6 years for women. In NI (2008-2010), it is 76.96 years for men and 81.4 years for women.
- In ROI, healthy life expectancy at aged 65 is 9.1 years for men and 9.9 years for women. In NI, healthy life expectancy is 12.5 years for men and 13.4 years for women. However, this does not take into account disability-free life expectancy.
- In ROI, 32% of those aged 65+ live more than 20 minutes away from a GP. Across the UK, 19% of those aged 65 and over do so.
- 95% of men and women in ROI aged 70 and over rate their health as very good (19%), good (50%) or fair (26%).
- In NI, 66% of people aged 70 and over rate their health as good (25%) or fairly good (42%).
