= Center for Economic and Social Rights =

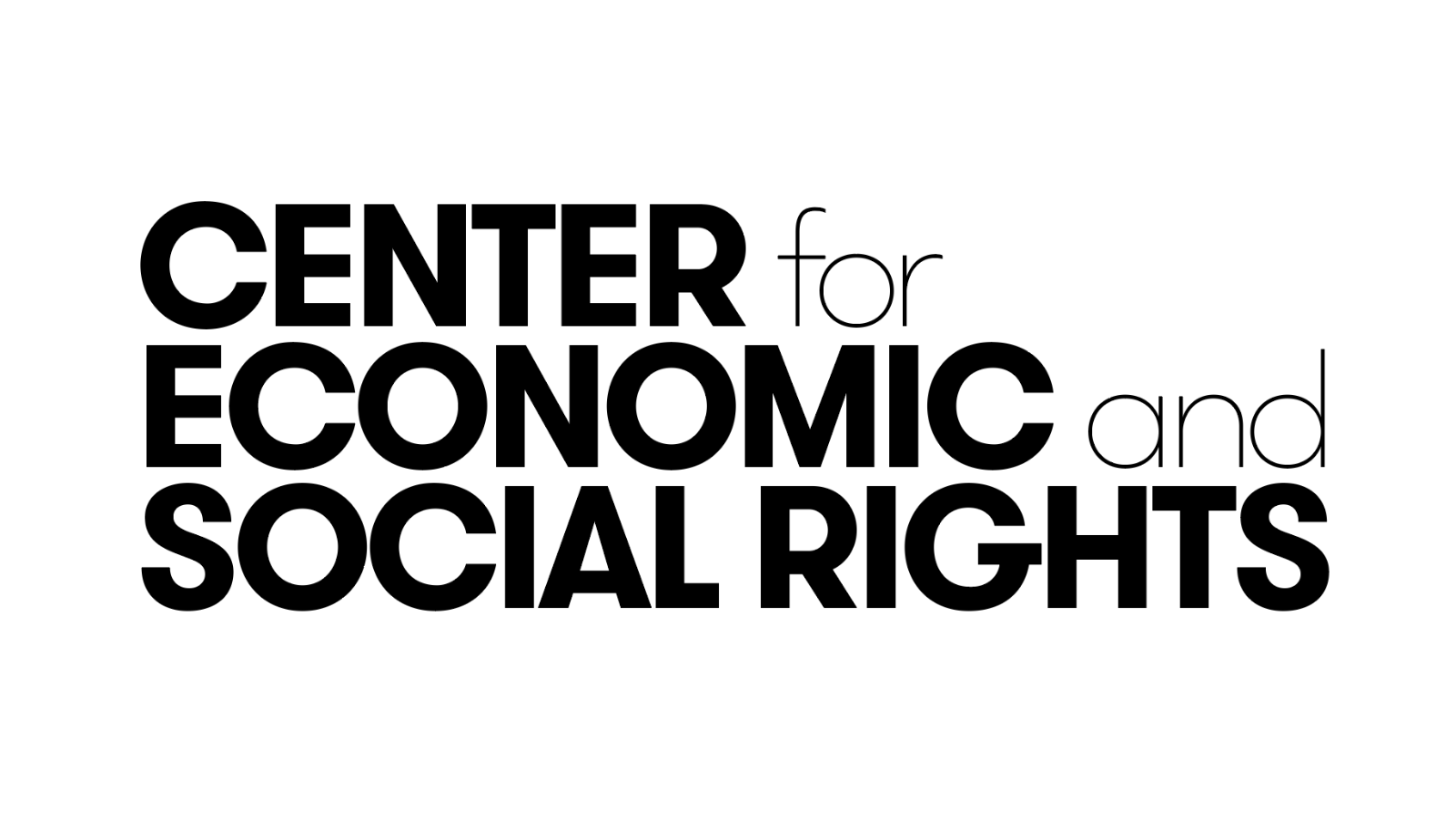
CESR's logo.

The Center for Economic and Social Rights (CESR) is an international human rights NGO that aims to transform the dominant global economic system into one based on human rights standards that provides dignity for all people and protects the planet.

The organization focuses its work on issues of education, health, food, water, housing, rights in crisis, poverty and inequality. The organization operates in 30 countries spread across many continents. In order to assure compliance with international human rights standards, CESR utilizes an interdisciplinary approach of legal and socioeconomic analysis to advocate issues and monitor, expose, and hold governments accountable for violations, in addition to provide the resources and legal documents to do so.

The official mission of CESR is "to work for the recognition and enforcement of economic and social rights as a powerful tool for promoting social justice and human dignity."

== Organizational background ==
CESR maintains an international board of directors, encompassing leadership from South Africa, the United States, Colombia, Japan, Bangladesh, Sweden, and Australia.

== Organizational history ==
CESR was founded in 1993 by Roger Normand, Sarah Zaidi and Chris Jochnick. CESR was established with the aim of bringing the human rights community back to its roots with the belief in the interdependence of all human rights established in the 1948 Universal Declaration of Human Rights. The organization has continued to carry out the original vision since its creation, yet it has evolved its strategies to adapt to and meet the consistent transformations and evolutions in the field of human rights as well as world issues at large.

In the years between 1993 and 1996, CESR mainly focused on research and advocacy projects to prove the importance of economic and social rights. It has convened a series of discussions and workshops with human rights, development and social justice groups to challenge the conceptual issues stating economic and social rights that were not a fundamental and equal components of the human rights framework . The organization also launched a project on health and the environment in Ecuador. Between 1997 and 2000, CESR established and strengthened projects in the United States, Latin America and the Middle East. This was also a significant period of strengthening the organization itself through extreme networking, consultations and coalition-building with many local groups and large organizations such as Amnesty International, CARE, Oxfam International, etc.

From 1998 to 2004, CESR extended its projects and areas of operations. It also expanded its functions to not only research and advocacy for economic and social rights but also carried out strategy-sharing and consulting and solidarity development functions. Yet, perhaps the most important transformation of the organization occurred between 2004 and 2008. In 2004, Eitan Felner became the new executive director of CESR and put into effect a series of rights monitoring techniques for the organization to use and teach to others in order to bring about more concrete changes. CESR's actions have also been narrowed to focus on more country-specific projects. In November 2008, Eitan Felner stepped down as executive director and was replaced with Ignacio Saiz, current executive director, in 2009. CESR currently has headquarters in New York.

== Economic and social rights ==
=== International law ===
Established and adopted in 1948, the Universal Declaration of Human Rights (UDHR) states that "All human beings are born free and equal in dignity and rights." The UDHR, the International Covenant on Civil and Political Rights (ICCPR) and its two optional protocols, and the International Covenant on Economic, Social and Cultural Rights (ICESCR) and its optional protocols form what is known as the International Bill of Human Rights. The International Covenant on Economic, Social and Cultural Rights was adopted on December 16, 1966 and entered into force in 1976. Its implementation and adherence by State participants is monitored by the Committee on Economic, Social and Cultural Rights (CESCR), a body of eighteen international experts established in 1985 and regulated by the United Nations Economic and Social Council or ECOSOC.

=== Evolution and validity of economic and social rights ===
Economic and social rights are considered the second wave of rights behind civil and political rights. These rights include but are not limited to, the right to work, the just and favorable conditions of work, the right to form and join trade unions, the right to an adequate standard of living, and the right to food, adequate housing, health and education. It is argued by many scholars that economic and social rights originally started to evolve out of the industrialization of countries and the growth of a working class that began to mobilize and demand worker rights. Economic and social hardship and recognition continued to grow and become apparent in the later years following World War I and II, the Cold War, the Great Depression and significantly today, with the expansion of capitalism and development, typically of "third world" countries.

Although the UDHR of 1948 includes economic and social rights in Articles 22-27, civil and political rights are the main focus of the document. It is suggested that this lack of original representation in the UDHR is due to a lack of consensus on what economic and social rights are, their universality and their validity in international law. The creation of the International Covenant on Economic, Social and Cultural Rights was also met with much criticism surrounding the implementation of these rights into international law. First, critics argued, and some still exist today, that economic and social rights could not and should not be put into international law because they were incapable of being assessed by a court of law. Second, critics state that economic and social rights suffer from an inability to be immediately implemented. Finally, critics argue that, unlike civil and political rights that can be more easily provided, economic and social rights require much positive action significantly with resources and time. Yet, although the debate on the validity of economic and social rights is still present, the existence and status of economic and social rights in international law have been consolidated and are unquestionable. It is now consistently stressed in international human rights law, though not always enforced in practice by states, that economic, social and cultural rights are indivisible from civil and political rights whereby one right cannot be enjoyed without the others. Most importantly, the world will only continue to move into an era of globalization and development that will put economic and social rights at the forefront of international and national law.

== Programs and projects ==
CESR is currently working on many projects across the world and is operating in 30 countries.

=== Guatemala ===
One of the major projects taken on by CESR in Latin America is the case of Guatemala Although Guatemala is a mid-income country it has some of the worst social indicators and uneven distributions of wealth in Latin America. Despite having fairly ore resources than many other countries in the region, progress in the area of economic and social rights has been stunted and successful outcomes have been minimal. Through research and analysis, CESR determined that it is the state's fiscal policy that has been a driving factor in the denials and violations of economic and social rights in the country. CESR sought to facilitate and promote changes in Guatemala through exposing the problems with the state's fiscal policy and make human rights an integral part of the debate and reform of the nations' budgets and taxes. As is typical of CESR, the organization partnered with a local think tank of fiscal policy known as the Instituto Centroamericano de Estudios Fiscales as well as with other local advocacy groups of a wide range of topics including health, education, human rights, development, etc.

In addition to bringing human rights into fiscal debate and tax reforms and seeking government commitment on social spending in areas such as women's health, child malnourishment and ethnic and rural/urban inequalities, CESR has also stated its official advocacy goals as the following

- engage donor community
- promote national and local level human rights monitoring capacity
- counter media and business discourses
- urge and pressure for accountability at international human rights and development forums

CESR was, overall, able to affect the 2010 fiscal policy of Guatemala through its strategies and efforts and obtain government and donor commitment to economic and social rights, the enforcement and adherence to this commitment will prove difficult in the future especially as the CESR faced many limits and challenges significantly in the lack of knowledge and concern for human rights from policy makers and challenges of organizational partnership, among others. In addition, CESR promoted yet did not consolidate the monitoring capacity and ability of the state and other organizations for economic and social rights and was only able to make small advances in media and business discourses and apply pressure for accountability in international reviews.

=== Global ===
The Women's Economic Equality Project or WEEP was started by Sarah Zaidi of CESR in collaboration with Leilani Farha of Centre for Equality Rights in Accommodation and Shelagh Day of National Association of Women and the Law and is now a part of the Women's Working Group. It seeks to work beyond gender neutrality and analyze and expose the ways in which the economic and social rights of women are given a back seat to civil and political rights. In order to do so, recognition of the initial disadvantages women face in economic, social and cultural rights needs to be established so as to work towards the implementation of positive rights, not just gender neutrality, that will address women's persistent inequality and poverty in comparison to men. The Project aims to make women's issues an integral part of state and global policy, especially in an era of globalization where a neo-liberal-economic agenda is said to result in the exploitation of women.

== Organizational challenges ==
Economic and Social rights are particularly more difficult to expose and enforce than civil and political rights and CESR has met many challenges concerning its work and/or strategies, some met with success and others with failure. Critics suggest that it is not enough for an organization to simply expose a violation at the risk of becoming just another voice in a crowd but that greater methodological strength is needed. This includes not just focusing efforts at the higher end of the spectrum such as with governments and donors but more in-depth and greater involvement of the local populations who will be the ones most affected by a reallocation of resources inherent in economic and social rights.

== Public policy ==
The Center for Economic and Social Rights seeks to affect and change public policy concerning economic and social rights and international human rights law, in general through its research and advocacy. CESR has contributed numerous newsletters, country fact sheets, thematic issue publications, country specific publications and official UN submissions. They have also created a library of publications and resources concerning all areas of international human rights and developed a set of tools and resources for monitoring economic and social rights and dealing with its denials and violations. In addition to their efforts to educate the general public, groups, organizations and governments, their networking and coalition building as also allowed CESR to work towards public policy change through political pressure, significantly through exposure of denials and violations of economic and social rights and working towards holding governments and non-state actors accountable for these rights. In particular, CESR has worked extensively in the United States since 1998 to address the United States' opposition of and lack of ratification of the ICESR and consequently, its extreme lack of achievement in economic and social rights, one of the worst records of all high-income countries in the world. CESR, in addition to educational and political pressure measures, has even requested the Office of the High Commissioner of Human Rights of the United Nations to specifically evaluate the economic and social rights violations of the United States before the Universal Periodic Review, adding significant international pressure on the State.

As previously mentioned, CESR has also worked extensively for the change in public policy, specifically fiscal policy, in Guatemala and was met with success and setbacks. Like the United States, CESR is still working for accountability by states following international reviews. Generally speaking, CESR also works internationally to pressure states to fulfil their Millennium Development Goals with varying successes and setbacks.
