= Indian hospital =

Historically racially segregated hospitals in Canada

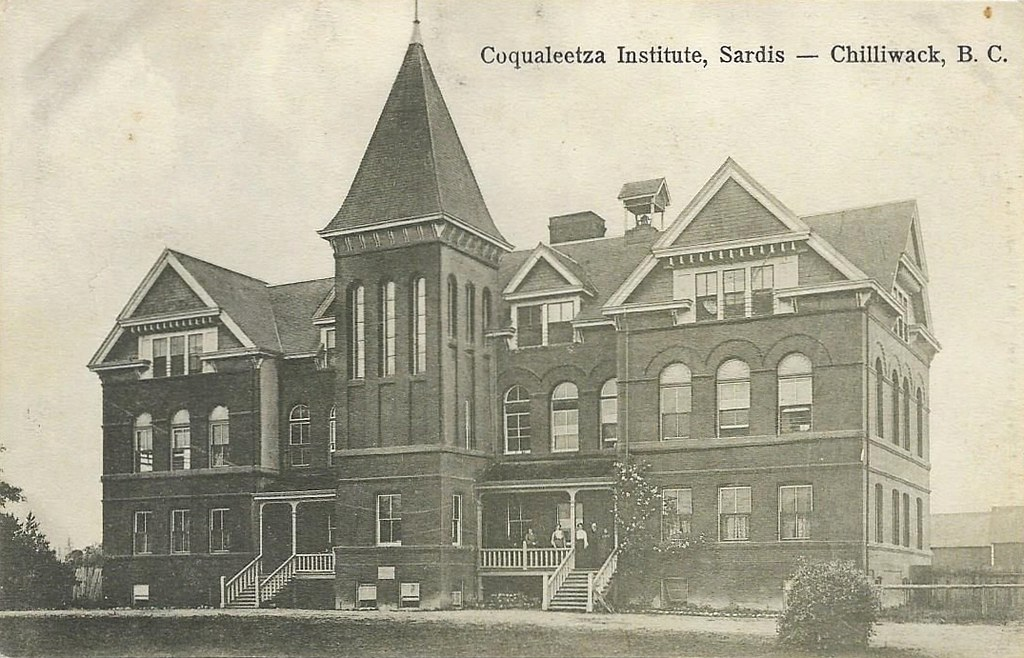
The Coqualeetza Indian Hospital which was located in Sardis, Chilliwack, British Columbia

The Indian hospitals (Note: Indian has been used in keeping with page name guidelines because of the historical nature of the page and the precision of the name similar to Canadian Indian residential school system. The use of the name also provides relevant context about the era in which the system was established, specifically one in which Indigenous peoples in Canada were homogeneously referred to as Indians rather than by language that distinguishes First Nations, Inuit and Métis peoples.. Use of Indian is limited throughout the page to proper nouns and references to government legislation.) were racially segregated hospitals for indigenous peoples in Canada which operated during the 19th and 20th century. Federally operated Indian hospitals originally served as tuberculosis sanatoria to isolate Indigenous tuberculosis patients from the general population because of a fear among health officials that "Indian TB" posed a danger to the non-indigenous population, and later operated as general hospitals. Many of these hospitals were located on Indian reserves, and might also be called reserve hospitals, while others were in nearby towns.

The federal government began operating racially segregated Indian hospitals in the 1920s, with early facilities for tuberculosis and sanatoriums that expanded significantly through the mid-1930s and post-World War 2. Segregated hospitals ended in 1981, when the last of the federally run facilities closed down.

== History ==
Indigenous populations had been affected by various diseases brought by European settlers and missionaries, including tuberculosis, smallpox, measles, mumps, diphtheria, typhoid, and influenza, from the 19th century onwards. These exposures to new diseases reduced the population by as much as 90%. At best, waves of infection are partially documented. Tuberculosis moved more slowly, but by 1950, one in five Inuit were infected. Mortality rates in the 1930s and 1940s rose higher than 700 people per 100,000.

Early hospitals for First Nations were mostly church-run, in a manner similar to the Indian residential schools. For example, the Grey Nuns opened a small hospital on the Blood reserve in southern Alberta in 1893 with the support of the Department of Indian Affairs, while the Anglican Church of Canada founded a hospital on the nearby Blackfoot reserve in 1896. Other "Indian annexes" (or "Indian wards" or "wings") were provided for segregated medical care, such as in the basements of hospitals for settler populations.

Slowly, the Department of Indian Affairs took control of the hospitals away from the churches. The Blood hospital was replaced with a new structure paid for by the department in 1928, and the Blackfoot hospital was replaced in 1923, partially with funds taken from the band's trust fund.

Government officials' request for the legal backing to forcibly remove Inuit and other Indigenous people from their communities is documented as far back as 1920. An amendment to the Indian Act was passed in 1927 to this effect.

=== National initiative ===
The newly-created federal Department of National Health and Welfare took over the building and running of Indian hospitals in 1946 as part of Canada's new welfare state policies following the Second World War. The national government began a large-scale operation, run under the auspices of the Advisory Committee for the Control and Prevention of Tuberculosis among Indians, to isolate and reduce the occurrence of the disease in northern populations. This included surveys of infection as well as forcible removal and confinement of those infected. The federal government made the choice not to build hospitals in the north but to evacuate infected individuals to the south of Canada and invest in facilities there. Several sanatorium, referred to as Indian Hospitals, were opened in Ontario and Quebec to accept evacuees, such as the Moose Factory Indian Hospital, opened in 1949, to "isolate the disease" on an island. The first state-run Indian Hospital was Charles Camsell Indian Hospital in Edmonton, opened in 1946 after converting an Indian residential school into a medical facility. By 1960, there were 22 federally-funded Indian hospitals. Most estimate that the cost of care in Indian hospitals was about half of what settler patients received, often in segregated hospitals side by side.

Part of the national operation were ships dedicated to carrying TB-infected passengers from Northern Canada to the sanatorium. One such ship was CGS C.D. Howe, part of the Eastern Arctic Patrol or Eastern Arctic Medical Patrol, a ship which was specially fitted after 1946 with medical facilities quarantined away from crew quarters, which ran from 1950 to 1969. The C. D. Howe had 30 beds for Inuit patients and crew space for 58, as well as a helicopter for transferring patients. The ships were equipped with x-ray technology to diagnose infections, and patients were marked on the hand with identifying numbers and the results of their tests. The Western Arctic Patrol mostly delivered patients to the hospital in Edmonton; the Eastern, to Hamilton. It was more common in western parts of the country to airlift patients than to ship them by water.

Settler medical professionals believed the "Indian TB" was a strain that posed a threat to the settler population, misunderstanding at the time the process of immunity through exposure, and the Aboriginal populations' lack of resistance to the disease brought unknowingly by settler carriers. The Inuit populations was considered to be "racially careless" about their health and containing the spread of the disease.

A particularly strong wave of the epidemic started in 1952. Canadian settler medical professionals attribute the spread of the disease, besides the Indigenous populations' lack of immunity, to overcrowded living conditions in Inuit communities - after forcible relocation by the Canadian government - and weakened constitutions through limited food supplies. Tuberculosis spread easily through the Inuit and First Nations populations, including in Canadian Indian residential schools, where healthy children were routinely exposed to infected children and poor sanitary conditions and ventilation contributed to the spread. In one school, the death toll was as high as 69%. In some residential schools, TB infection rates were as high as 80%; schools that held infected children due to overburdened hospitals were given a stipend to provide healthcare to their students of fifteen cents per child per day.

In 1953, mortality rates from TB in the Inuit population was 298.1 per 100,000 patients, compared to 9.9 per 100,000 in southern and settler communities. It is estimated that by 1955, almost 1,000 Inuit had been removed for treatment in southern Canada.

In 1953 it was also made a crime for an Indigenous person to refuse treatment or to leave a hospital before being discharged. Patients who wished to return home to their communities were arrested and taken to jail or brought back to the hospitals.

A 1983 study by S. Grzybowski and E. Dorken titled Turburculosis in Inuit found that:

In the 1950s tuberculosis became a grave problem with the mortality rate approaching 1% per annum and the incident rate almost 3%. The annual risk of infection has been estimated at 25% per annum. These are probably the highest rates recorded anywhere in the world in the 20th century.

Medical professionals continue to congratulate themselves on successfully stemming the tide of the disease through such interventions of forcible removal of infected individuals from their homes. At several points when rates of TB diagnosis lessened, the efforts to prevent the disease were defunded, resulting in an increase in infection rates again.

Indian hospitals began being phased out in the late 1960s and every Indian hospital was closed or converted to desegregated institutions by 1981.

== Conditions ==
=== Diagnosis ===
Research conducted by Oloffson, Holson, and Partridge describes the conditions endured by Inuit communities during the diagnosis process:

Being told that they had to leave with the hospital boat or airplane to go to a hospital in the South was a frightening experience for most of the patients.... Many were diagnosed while still asymptomatic, and as such there was often great confusion as to why they were being taken from their homes and families. Even when they were aware of their condition, it was not always made clear to the patients where they were being taken or if they would ever be returned, contributing to an atmosphere of fear and desperation. In some cases, Inuit who knew that they were seriously ill would hide out on the land once they had heard that the hospital boat was arriving. In these situations, a helicopter, originally intended to fly ahead of the boat to check ice conditions or bring medical personnel to shore if the boat could not dock, was used to survey the land, find anyone hiding, and bring them to the boat for examination.

Shawn Selway states that while leaving their homes for treatment was not mandatory, most Inuit felt pressured in a way that could not be considered consensual.

Because the skin test for TB was unreliable, diagnostic ships began to rely more on chest x-rays, exposing children and adults to yearly doses of radiation, for some community members over 40 years.

In 1928, doctors who later ran the Fort Qu'Appelle Indian Hospital were given federal funding to develop drugs to fight the TB epidemic. In 1933, they began running experimental vaccination trials on Indigenous children from nearby communities. The vaccination was declared a success despite limited validation; there were also several problems, including a need to re-vaccinate every two years. Also, people vaccinated with the drug would test as false positives by the Mantoux skin test for TB that was in standard use, meaning successfully inoculated people would end up in hospital anyhow. In 1952 two inoculated girls tested positive for TB, but this was hushed up by government officials. By 1954, this vaccination was a mandatory treatment across Canada.

=== Removal ===
When an Indigenous person had a tuberculosis diagnosis confirmed, they were rarely allowed back into their communities until deemed free of tuberculosis. Evacuees could not go ashore to collect their belongings, say good-bye, or make arrangements for their families - children were often adopted by neighbours and family members in Inuit communities.

Children, even infants, who were diagnosed with tuberculosis would be taken from their parents and sent with the boat. Men and women would be forced to leave their families behind [...] at times left without a father to hunt or a mother to make clothes or care for the children. Evacuees in turn faced great emotional distress, knowing that it would be difficult for their family to survive without them. As exemplified in the quote above, so great was the desperation, that the minister would often marry couples when one of them had to leave for the hospital, in order to sanctify the union while there was still time to do so.

Fear of removal was a deterrent to getting tested, and even deterred remote Inuit from going to town while the ship was docked:

In 1955, RCMP reported that Inuit in the Kimmirut area were now avoiding the settlement at shiptime because they had no desire of “being evacuated to the Land of No Return.”

Medical ships' helicopters were sometimes used to seek out and forcibly pick up Inuit who were hiding in rural areas. Some former patients assert that they were sent to sanatoria for treatment without actually testing positive for tuberculosis:

"[My mom] was told she had TB, but many years later, when she went to the doctor, they said to her, 'No — you would have had scars on your lungs,'" Hunt said.

Some researchers agree with this assessment, indicating that some Indigenous community members were forcibly removed from their land by means of a TB diagnosis:

Declaring individuals contagious was a good means of control, keeping them out of trouble or out of circulation while the task of clearing the land was underway.

Some rates of removal of Indigenous people from their communities have been quoted as 5,240 Inuit from 1953 and 1961, compared to a total population in the Eastern Arctic of about 11,500. The Nanaimo hospital saw 14,000 patients during its two-decade tenure.

From 1950 to 1965, 1,274 Inuit and Cree patients were removed from their communities and placed in institutional care in Hamilton, Ontario, alone. At this hospital, Inuit patients carved and sold around 200 soapstone pieces a month, with the hospital taking a 30% commission on all sales. The total value of Inuit art sold through this process was over $10,000CAD per year.

Some researchers assert that hospitals kept patients interned for years or decades to increase government funding received, and to provide a supply of patients for experimental medical procedures.

The average stay in sanatoria ranged depending on the availability of drug treatments introduced in the 1940s. In 1949, at the Mountain Sanatorium in Hamilton, a patient stayed for an average of 562 days; in 1956, the average stay was 332 days.

=== Hospital conditions ===
Many evacuees were sent to institutions with English and French-speaking staff, which made communication difficult. It has been alleged that hospitals were staffed by foreign-trained doctors whose credentials were not recognized in Canada. In several hospitals, patients were referred to by assigned identification numbers, the disc number system, instead of their names.

Low salaries, poor working conditions, and the isolated locations of many hospitals made it difficult to maintain adequate numbers of qualified staff. These hospitals also did not receive the same level of funding as facilities for non-Indigenous communities. Although treatment for tuberculosis in non-Indigenous patients improved during the 1940s and 1950s, these innovations were not propagated to the Indian hospitals. In hospitals such as the Queen Mary (Toronto), where settler and Indigenous children were treated side-by-side, a white former patient reports being given pills while Indigenous patients were given injections.

There are high rates of reported depression in patients. People forcibly transported and confined in sanatoria were often given little information about their treatment and rights:

"Perhaps you are wondering why you are brought down from your home leaving your friends and perhaps family behind. The reason is that you are sick, and if you were left at home, you may endanger those at home. So you are here to get well again… But do not be afraid. Nobody here will harm you."– Mountain Views, Hamilton Sanatorium, 1955

Several hospitals were converted military buildings that were improperly equipped for their new use. Overcrowding was common and many patients were at risk of inadequate emergency exits in case of fire. Patients were often underfed or deprived of food and drink. Others report being force-fed unfamiliar foods, and being forced to eat their own vomit. Some patients were tied to their beds, including being tied face-down overnight, and suffered other abuses from hospital staff. One patient reports being tied to her bed for almost 24 hours a day for nine years:

"The only time we were untied was first thing in the morning to have a bath and then change our pajamas and go back to bed." [...] She said the ties were also taken off for meals they ate in the bed. If they needed to use the bathroom, they were brought a bedpan.

Most were on strict bed rest and some lost the ability to walk after several years of confinement. There are documented cases of hospital staff putting casts on the legs of patients who would not comply.

Drees said in cases of bone TB, the bacterium would make bones brittle, so children and adults would be immobilized in full-body casts or strapped onto stretchers to be still.

Children who did such things as sit up in bed or put a foot on the floor were punished by being strapped, spanked, or being forced to wear a straitjacket for a period of time.

Whonnock recalled a time when she had chickenpox and was served turnips. The smell made her ill and she threw up on her plate. A nurse hit her with a rod and made her eat the vomit.

There are survivor reports of sexual assault by hospital staff, including children being groped as a matter of course during monthly X-ray examinations, and a pre-teen having a sexual relationship with an adult orderly. Patients report being threatened and told not to talk about their experiences at the hospitals.

At least one Indian hospital, the Fort William Sanatorium, served a dual use as a residential school, where tuberculosis-diagnosed children received education. Some rooms were converted for classroom use, and students who were bedridden received bedside lessons. This school received funding from the Department of Indian Affairs for its educational expenses. Reports indicate that "'at least one teacher provided education to Aboriginal children between 1942 and 1945'" and that it "housed a Provincial School starting as early as 1944 to as late as 1971, and an Indian Day School between 1950 and 1953." Survivors of Fort William petitioned to have their cases included in the Residential Schools Settlement, but were denied as the sanatorium was not accepting patients primarily for educational purposes.

=== Surgery, drugs, and experimentation ===
From 1949 to 1953, 374 experimental surgeries were performed on TB patients, without the use of general anesthetic at the Charles Camsell Indian Hospital. In 1956, Charles Camsell Indian Hospital in Edmonton used its patients to test versions of para-aminosalicylic acid (PAS); they also performed trials of a thyroid-stimulating hormone for a study of hypothyroidism in Indigenous people. Besides treatment with drugs, surgical procedures were performed on patients, including the intentional collapsing of lungs and removal of ribs, causing deformities. At Charles Camsell in Edmonton, medical staff used local anesthetic on Indigenous patients during such processes as chest surgery and rib removals, so that the patients would be awake and aware during the procedures. Other hospital patients report forced sterilization, with 125 sterilizations documented at the Charles Camsell hospital between 1971 and 1974.

Some patients report that in the early stages of tuberculosis care, children were being used "as guinea pigs" for experimental treatment for the infection:

=== Discharge and death ===
Documentation was uneven at best; people's names were written down incorrectly, sometimes resulting in a cured patient being sent home to the wrong area, or the family of a dead patient not being notified. Many patients who returned home after their confinement found it difficult to readjust to their culture, having forgotten skills and languages. Two separate cases of babies being switched at birth (sent home with the wrong parents) at Norway House have been reported; these errors were only discovered many years later.

Many of those who died while in treatment were buried in unmarked graves; many bodies were not returned to their families. One estimate puts the number of missing people and unreturned bodies at 700-800. A then-student of a nearby residential school remembers digging graves for tuberculosis victims from the Charles Camsell Hospital in Edmonton.

== Legacy ==
Many northern communities still have high rates of infection for TB, despite improvements in vaccination in the late 20th and early 21st centuries. In some cases, the rates of TB are 50% higher in the Inuit population compared to southern Canada. In Nunavut the rates are said to be 296 times higher for Inuit compared to non-Aboriginal people and that of the 25 communities in the territory at least 17 have TB cases, with Qikiqtarjuaq having 10% of the population infected.

Rates in 2013 are similar to those found in 1953:

Overall, Canada consistently has a TB rate of fewer than 10 people per 100,000. Among Inuit populations though, this rate is as high as 195 per 100,000. That’s even higher than the global average, 122, and comparable to rates in Afghanistan, India, and Bangladesh.

However, by 2017 rates had risen to over 261 per 100,000. As in the case of the Indian residential schools, many family members and community members who had relatives in the Indian hospitals are still searching for closure after the deaths and disappearances of their loved ones, including looking for the locations of grave sites. In 2021, amidst a number of discoveries of unmarked gravesites at former residential schools, searches were started as Charles Camsell, a former hospital and school:

“It’s more than a belief,” Bruneau said. “We got research and documents – even a map – that shows in the southeast corner of that property where potential human remains are.”

Art created by evacuees in the sanatorium in Hamilton has been collected and donated to the Art Gallery of Hamilton. The Chedoke Hospital (formerly Mountain Sanatorium) had kept a set of 55 pieces created by its patients, which was brought up to 132 pieces through donations from buyers. The lot of 75 pieces of soapstone carvings in the collection of the AGH has been valued at $300,000CAD.

=== Apology ===
The Canadian government took many years to offer apologies for the forcible confinement of Inuit. A federal program called Nanilavut had been performing research since 2008 and has identified at least partial records for over 4,500 evacuees. In 2018, there were expectations of a future federal apology for the Indian hospital system. Discussions around an official apology were held in 2017 between the federal government and Nunavut Tunngavik Inc. The group asked for help with identifying the graves of Inuit patients buried in the south of Canada, as well as counselling services for former patients and their descendants. The government acknowledged that a future apology but had not confirmed a date or location. Prime Minister Justin Trudeau eventually issued an apology on March 8, 2019, and announced a federal government project called "Nanilavut," saying:

The Nanilavut initiative will be more than just an apology. That means it will include measures, which have already started, aimed at helping Inuit find the graves of family members who were transported to southern Canada for TB treatment between the 1940s and the 1960s.

=== Lawsuit ===
In January 2018, a $1.1 billion class-action lawsuit was filed against the Canadian government to provide compensation for victims of Indian hospitals and their descendants. The lawsuit represented 30 former patients by the end of January 2018. This lawsuit also points to the inadequate care, physical and sexual abuse, and the long term negative health and psychological impacts associated with the hospitals.

== Institutions ==
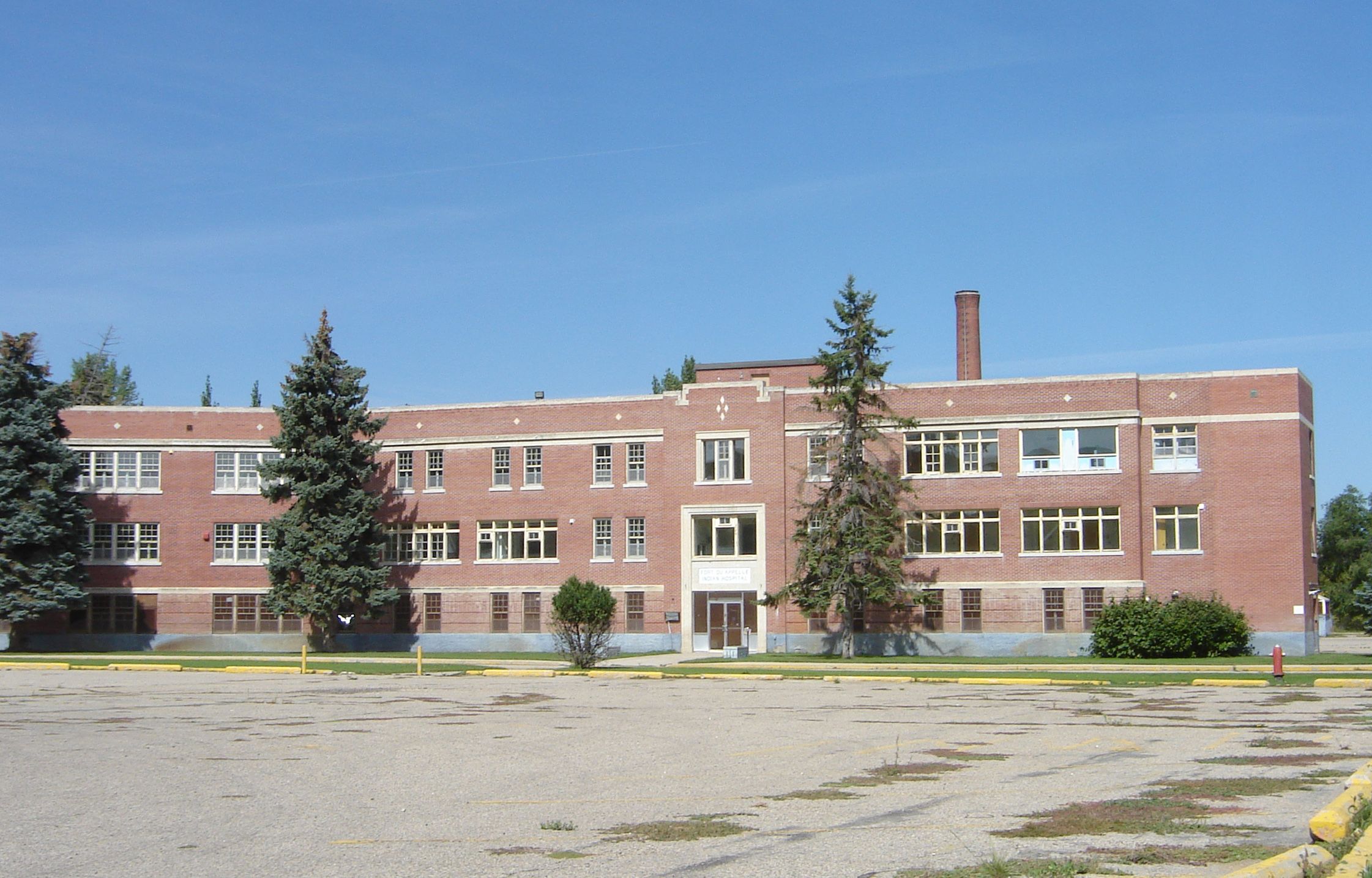
Fort Qu'Appelle Indian Hospital

An unconfirmed number of hospitals were run by the Department of National Health and Welfare across Canada from the mid-1940s onward (under the Indian Health Services Branch in 1944). These include:

- Blood Indian Hospital, Cardston, Alberta, 1928-
- Charles Camsell Indian Hospital, Edmonton, Alberta, converted to Indian hospital from a residential school in 1946, with a new building added in 1967, integrated in the 1970s, and closed in 1996
- Coqualeetza Indian Hospital, Sardis, British Columbia, one of the first independent treatment facilities for Indigenous people, from 1941 to 1969, with 150+ beds. Site closed.
- Nanaimo Indian Hospital, Nanaimo, British Columbia, 1946 to 1966 or 1967, a former military hospital, with 210 beds Hospital buildings demolished 2004.
- Fort Qu'Appelle Indian Hospital, Fort Qu'Appelle, Saskatchewan, constructed in 1935 with 50 beds Closed in 2004.
- Fisher River Indian Hospital, later Percy E. Moore Hospital, Hodgson, Manitoba
- Norway House Indian Hospital, Norway House, Manitoba, opened in 1952
- Ninette Tuberculosis Sanatorium, Ninette, Manitoba, opened in 1909
- Moose Factory Indian Hospital, Moose Factory, Ontario
- Sanatorium on the Mountain, renamed in 1961 as Chedoke Hospital, Hamilton, Ontario, a community hospital that began accepting Inuit patients in the 1950s
- Toronto Sanatorium, Weston, Ontario and the associated Toronto Free Hospital for the Consumptive Poor c. 1904 / Queen Mary Hospital for Tuberculosis c. 1914 (closed 1970 and all are now under West Park Healthcare Centre) which specialized in pediatric cases of TB
- Parc Savard Hospital in Quebec City, Quebec, where artist Kenojuak Ashevak was confined from 1952 to 1955
- Miller Bay Indian Hospital in Prince Rupert British Columbia
- Fort William Sanatorium, Fort William, Ontario, 1935-1974

The 29 hospitals listed in a class-action lawsuit are:

- Tobique Indian Hospital (New Brunswick)
- Manitowaning Indian Hospital (Ontario)
- Lady Willington Indian Hospital (Ontario)
- Squaw Bay Indian Hospital (Ontario)
- Moose Factory Indian Hospital (Ontario)
- Sioux Lookout Indian Hospital (Ontario)
- Brandon Indian Hospital (Manitoba)
- Dynevor Indian Hospital (Manitoba)
- Fisher River Indian Hospital (Manitoba)
- Fort Alexander Indian Hospital (Manitoba)
- Clearwater Lake Indian Hospital (Manitoba)
- Norway House Indian Hospital (Manitoba)
- Fort Qu'Appelle Indian Hospital (Saskatchewan)
- North Battleford Indian Hospital (Saskatchewan)
- Peigan Indian Hospital (Alberta)
- Sarcee Indian Hospital (Alberta)
- Blood Indian Hospital (Alberta)
- Morley/Stoney Indian Hospital (Alberta)
- Hobbema Indian Hospital (Alberta)
- Blackfoot Indian Hospital (Alberta)
- Charles Camsell Indian Hospital (Alberta)
- Coqualeetza Indian Hospital (British Columbia)
- Miller Bay Indian Hospital (British Columbia)
- Nanaimo Indian Hospital (British Columbia)
- Fort Simpson Hospital (Northwest Territories)
- Fort Norman Indian Hospital (Northwest Territories)
- Frobisher Bay Indian Hospital (Northwest Territories)
- Inuvik Hospital (Northwest Territories)
- Whitehorse Indian Hospital (Yukon)

== Notable Inuit confined for tuberculosis ==
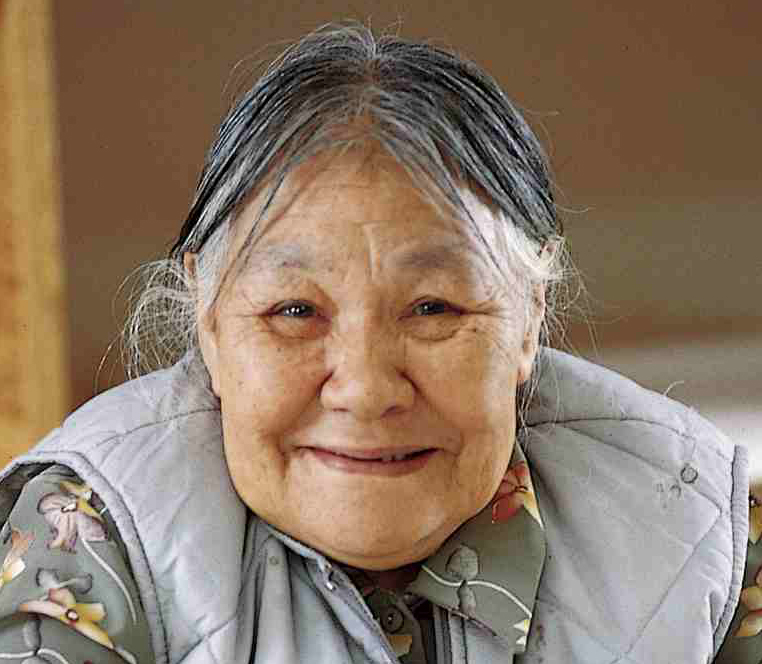
Kenojuak Ashevak

- Kenojuak Ashevak, confined from 1952 to 1955
- Oviloo Tunnillie, artist, sent away when she was 5 years old, then again from ages 7 to 8
- Mosha Michael, confined in childhood
- Jack Anawak, Liberal MP and son of a woman who was removed from her family in 1956 and died in hospital in 1958
- Evacuee artists whose soapstone carvings were later collected by museums and galleries include Guy Mamatiaq, Moses Meeko, Noona, Alivaktak Petaloosie, Simon POV, Mikisiti Saila, and Kanayuk Tukalak
- Abe Okpik, hunter and author, was the first Inuk to sit on the Northwest Territories Legislative Council, he later (1968-1971) headed Project Surname which replaced disc numbers with names

== Depictions in culture ==
- The Necessities of Life, a film released in 2008, tells the story of an evacuee being sent to a sanatorium in Quebec City in 1952, where he meets and befriends an infected orphan child.
- Camsell, a 2016 13-minute documentary about the Charles Camsell Hospital, on YouTube.
- Raymond Yakeleya is planning an upcoming documentary about the Charles Camsell Hospital.

== See also ==
- Pass system (Canadian history)
- Compulsory sterilization in Canada
- Sixties Scoop
- High Arctic relocation
