= Alexina Kublu =

Canadian linguist and educator (born 1959)

- ᐊᓕᒃᓯᓈ ᑯᑉᓗ

3rd Languages Commissioner of Nunavut
- In office January 2009 – January 14, 2013
- Premier: Paul Okalik
- Commissioner: Ann Meekitjuk Hanson
- Preceded by: Eva Aariak (interim); Johnny Kusugak
- Succeeded by: Sandra Inutiq

Personal details
- Born: 1954 Igloolik, Northwest Territories, Canada
- Died: 2025 (aged 70–71)
- Spouse: Mick Mallon (d. 2023)
- Children: 2
- Occupation: Jurist, scholar, teacher, Languages Commissioner of Nunavut

Alexina Kublu (Inuktitut: ᐊᓕᒃᓯᓈ ᑯᑉᓗ; 1954 – c. December 2025) was a Canadian linguist, educator, translator, and jurist who served as the third Languages Commissioner of Nunavut and as the first Justice of the Peace in Nunavut.

Born in Igloolik in the then Northwest Territories, Kublu attended the Canadian Indian residential school system, forcing her to travel 800 kilometres (500 mi) to attend residential school. Kublu attained her Bachelor of Education, after which she became a teacher and later on as an instructor in the Language and Culture Program at Nunavut Arctic College, where she oversaw the development of the Inuit Studies Program. Work by Kublu and her future husband, Mick Mallon, aided in the furthering of Inuktitut research and the development of a curriculum for the instruction of Inuktitut.

She stepped down from her position at Nunavut Arctic College to serve as Senior Justice of the Peace under Justice Beverly Browne, the first person in Nunavut to be in the position. Kublu served as the chair for the Akitsiraq Law School Society which worked to bring legal education to northern Canadians. Kublu worked as a board member for the Canadian Association for Suicide Prevention, and worked as a volunteer and board member for the Kamatsiqtut Nunavut Help Line.

A certified English/Inuktitut interpreter, Kublu served as a member of the Canadian Interpreters and Translators Council. She was appointed to the role of Languages Commissioner of Nunavut, succeeding outgoing commissioner Johnny Kusugak. In her position, she oversaw the implementation of the Official Languages Act and the Inuit Languages Protection Act in Nunavut, the latter of which expanded her mandate to take action in instances of violations to the acts. She served in the position from 2009 to 2013, where she was succeeded by Sandra Inutiq.

== Early life ==
Kublu was born in Igloolik in 1954, in what was then the Northwest Territories. Kublu is the daughter of Kupaaq and the granddaughter of Iqallijuq. Kublu was given the disc number E51287. Kublu was named after her great-grandfather, the man who was her grandmother's stepfather, and thus Kublu was treated as such. (Note: In the Inuit kinship system, the atiapik, the female kinship term for a (often deceased) namesake, means that the individual becomes their namesake. As Alexina was named after her great grandfather (her grandmother's stepfather), she thus became him through the means of atiapik. Thus she is her grandfather's father in the Inuit system.) The same system led to Kublu's youngest daughter calling her "inni" (son), and Kublu calling her "atatta" (father). She recalled that while out in Churchill, she was given the name Alexina K Piroatuk as part of Project Surname. She complained to Abe Okpik, who informed her that children under the age of 19 had to take their parents' surname and that she would be able to apply for a name change after turning 19. She would later rectify her surname to Kublu.

She was taken to attend the Chesterfield Inlet residential school, the Sir Joseph Bernier Day School, having to travel 800 kilometres (500 mi) away from her home community of Igloolik. Speaking on her experiences, Kublu expressed her feelings of isolation due to a lack of other Inuktitut speakers at the institution. She received her Bachelor of Education through the Nunavut Teacher Education Program, and underwent her training in the communities of Chesterfield Inlet and Fort Smith.

== Career ==
Kublu worked as a teacher in the communities of Arctic Bay, Arviat, Cape Dorset, and Igloolik. She additionally served as an instructor in the Language and Culture Program at Nunavut Arctic College. Through her work as an instructor, she worked as the editor for the book Inuit Recollections on the Military Presence in Iqaluit. While there, she oversaw the development of the Inuit Studies Program within the college, where she was succeeded Maaki Kakkik. Kublu left the Nunavut Arctic College after accepting to work as a full-time Justice of the Peace. Within the Nunavut Department of Education she worked as an Apprenticeship and Government Staff Training officer and in the Rankin Inlet Department of Municipal Affairs she worked as a Municipal Training officer. She was later approached by the University of Washington's Canadian Studies Center to teach students Inuktitut, where she conducted lessons through Skype. Kublu worked as the elder board member of the Iqaluit District Education Authority as of 2023.

She worked as the executive director of the Kitikmeot Regional Council, Executive Director of the Atii Training Program in Ottawa, and a board member of the Canadian Association for Suicide Prevention. She was a board member of the Kamatsiqtut Nunavut Help Line, where she previously worked as a volunteer.

For eight years, Kublu served as a senior justice of the peace as part of the Nunavut Justices of the Peace Program, serving under chief justice Beverly Browne. She was the first individual appointed as justice of the peace in Nunavut. Kublu serves as the chair of the Akitsiraq Law School Society, which was set up by former Justice Beverly Browne to make legal education more accessible for northern Canadians.

Kublu served on the Federal Ministerial Task Force on Aboriginal Languages and Cultures. In 2022, Kublu was called to testify as part of the Standing Committee on Indigenous and Northern Affairs' (INAN) Report 9, an inquiry on the processes of reclaiming, revitalizing, maintaining, and strengthening the Indigenous languages of Canada.

=== Languages commissioner of Nunavut ===
Kublu served as the Official Languages Commissioner of the territory of Nunavut from 2009 to 2013. She was the third individual to serve in the position, succeeding Eva Aariak, who was serving in an interim basis after the resignation of Johnny Kusugak in 2007. A certified Inuktitut/English language interpreter, she was as a member of the Canadian Interpreters and Translators Council. Kublu retired from her position as language commissioner on September 28, 2012. She was succeeded by Sandra Inutiq, who previously served as the executive director of the Qulliit Nunavut Status of Women Council.

The position of the languages commissioner is a four-year long position that is appointed by the Commissioner of Nunavut under the recommendation of the Legislative Assembly of Nunavut of whom they report directly to. The position was established under the provisions of the Official Languages Act. Since it is an independent position, she is able to carry out investigations of violations of the Inuit Languages Protection Act and the Official Languages Act. In her capacity as languages commissioner, she ensured that kindergarten to grade 3 education was capable of teaching students Inuktitut, and explored new methods to encourage Nunavut's youth to embrace Inuktitut. She investigated the Government of Nunavut for its violations of the Official Languages Act and the negative outcomes on elder health and government employees. During her tenure, she presided over the passage of the new Official Languages Act, which lowered the territory's official languages from eight to four. She stated that her office would not enforce a standardized dialect for Inuktitut and refused to push for the removal of Inuktitut syllabics in favour of the Roman orthography. Kublu was critical of languages minister Louis Tapardjuk's delay on the implementation of legislation pertaining to the official languages of Nunavut.

During her tenure as languages commissioner, she oversaw the passage of the Inuit Language Protection Act which ensures the right for Inuktitut speakers to use Inuktitut within their work in the Government, established interpretation services, and ensured resources are available to accommodate for Inuktitut speakers. This included the establishment of a Microsoft interface that was compatible with the Inuktitut language. Kublu's mandate was expanded on July 1, 2009, per the provisions of the Inuit Language Protection Act, giving her the ability to accept oral complaints regarding language related issues within the territory and giving her the mandate to take action. For her part, she worked to build up public awareness of the act and speaking to community members on its impact on individual rights and obligations. She spoke with governmental, municipal, and private sector representatives on how the new law would affect them and inform them of the services needed.

During the Language and Territory International Conference held at Laurentian University, Kublu met with the respective language commissioners at the federal, provincial (New Brunswick and Ontario), and territorial (Northwest Territories) levels to discuss ways to safeguard language rights.

== Personal life ==
Kublu was married to scholar and linguist Mick Mallon. Mallon and Kublu became acquainted through their work at the Nunavut Arctic College, where they both developed an Inuktitut curriculum. The couple would later teach together as part of the Canadian Studies Center of the University of Washington. Work by Kublu and Mallon was central to the development of the Inuktitut language education website Tusaalanga, and research into strategies for the evolving retention of Inuktitut in the online age. Kublu's language work was recognized in 2022 when she was the recipient of the Inuit Language Award. Her daughter, Evelyn Papatsi Kublu-Hill, serves as the language coordinator for the Atausiq Inuktut Titirausiq initiative by the Inuit Tapiriit Kanatami, which aims to create a standardized writing system for the Inuktut dialects. Kublu's sister, Rosalie Ugjuk, was struck and killed in an Ottawa road accident in 2010.

Kublu is a life member of the Nunatta Sunakkutaangit Museum. Kublu was a contributor to Nunavut '99, a book distributed to residents of Nunavut in celebration of the creation of the territory. Alongside Mallon, she contributed the chapter "Our Language, Our Selves" alongside Mallon.

A residential school survivor, Kublu met with Pope Francis as part of his visit to Canada, where he lit Kublu's mother's qulliq. She met with former residential school survivors as part of the National Gathering on Unmarked Burials, a gathering hosted to address the northern perspective on the issue of unmarked graves. During the event, Kublu testified regarding her experiences attending day school in Chesterfield Inlet.

== Death ==
In January 2026, Nunavut Legislative Assembly Speaker David Joanasie issued a statement mourning Kublu's recent passing at age 71.
