= Zebedee Nungak =

Inuk politician and activist (born 1951)

Zebedee Nungak CQ
- ᔭᐃᐱᑎ ᓄᓐᖓᖅ
- Born: Jabedee Noongoak; 23 April 1951 (age 75); Saputiligait, Quebec, Canada
- Political party: Independent
- Awards: National Order of Quebec

Zebedee Nungak CQ (Inuktitut: ᔭᐃᐱᑎ ᓄᓐᖓᖅ Jaipiti Nunngaq; born 23 April 1951) is a Canadian Inuk author, actor, essayist, journalist, and politician. As a child, Nungak was taken from his home in the community of Saputiligait, along with two other children, for the purposes of an experiment by the Canadian government to "expunge them of Inuit culture and groom them to become northern leaders with a southern way of thinking." Nungak later became pivotal in securing successful land rights claims and the creation of his home territory of Nunavik.

In his early career, Nungak worked as a translator and interpreter for the Canadian government. He then became one of the founding members of the Northern Quebec Inuit Association, and a signatory to the James Bay and Northern Quebec Agreement. During the aboriginal rights constitutional conferences, Nungak was the co-chair of the Inuit Committee on National Issues. He later served as vice president, and eventually president, of the Makivik Corporation, where he actively worked to ensure the recognition of Inuit rights. In 2017, in recognition to his services to the Inuit of Northern Quebec, he was awarded the National Order of Quebec by Premier of Quebec Philippe Couillard.

== Early life ==
Zebedee Nungak (Inuktitut: ᔭᐃᐱᑎ ᓄᓐᖓᖅ Jaipiti Nunngaq) was born in the community of Saputiligait, Nunavik, Quebec, a small village south of Puvirnituq on 23 April 1951. The location was listed as "Kenoruk's camp" by the Anglican priest who had recorded his birthplace; Nungak mused that it was likely due to the inability for the reverend to spell the location's name correctly. He had received the E-number E9-1956, a disc number assigned to Inuit in the east which was abolished in 1978. Nungak's mother was biracial, having been born to an Inuk mother and a Scottish father; Nungak never met his maternal grandfather. He was one of seven children, alongside Talasia, Poasie, Harry, Aliva, Alasie, and Joanasie. Nungak's name at birth was listed as Jabedee Noongoak. Later in life, he had to have a lawyer certify that the two names belonged to the same person.

=== The "Eskimo Experiment" ===
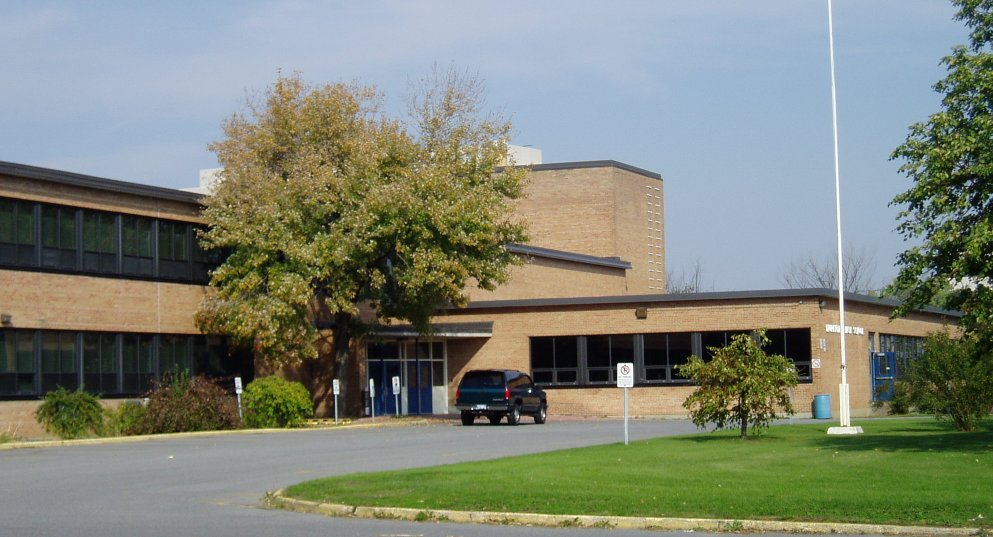
Between 1966 and 1969, grades 9–11, Nungak attended Ottawa's Laurentian High School.

Until he was 12 years old, Nungak attended day school at the Povungnituk Federal Day School. When Nungak was 12 years old, on 14 August 1963, he was taken as a part of what was called the "Eskimo Experiment" by the Government of Canada. Where he, along with two other children, Peter Ittinuar and Eric Tagoona, was to finish high school in the south of Canada. The three children, chosen due to their high test scores, were taken from their homes without their families' informed consent and housed with English-speaking middle-class families in the city of Ottawa. Nungak, unlike Ittinuar and Tagoona, described his entry into the experiment as a "walk in", not having undergone IQ testing. Nungak as part of the experiment, attended three schools: Ottawa's Parkway Public School, J.H. Putman Public School, and Laurentian High School. Nungak, alongside Ittinuar and Tagoona, excelled at physical sports such as judo and swimming. The three appeared on the cover of the 1964 edition of Judo World magazine.

Nungak, reflecting on his experiences and his treatment by his host families, described having "nothing bad to say about anybody during that period." Ramifications came due to Nungak's isolation from his community, Nungak was not around for the birth of his youngest sister, nor for the death of his grandmother. Nungak was isolated from his family who were left unable to contact him following his relocation to Ottawa. Once Nungak had returned, he faced ridicule from his Inuit peers, but felt simultaneously unable to fit into the southern society he was taken to. Nungak had lost key skills that other members in his community had developed; he was unable to remove the seal's bile sack, or cut snow blocks using a pana, a kind of snow knife.

The experiment, with archived documentation, was conducted as to determine if the Inuit had the same level of intelligence as their non-Inuit counterparts. The program had been devised to "expunge them of Inuit culture and groom them to become northern leaders with a southern way of thinking." While conducting the experiment, the Canadian government acknowledged the possible ramifications of the program in destroying family ties, as well as Inuit culture. The Canadian government later conducted a similar program in 1965, resettling four Inuit girls. In 2009, a film detailing their experiences, The Experimental Eskimos, was made by filmmaker Barry Greenwald.

== Career ==
As a result of their extended time as part of the experiment, Nungak and Ittinuar realized they had a unique perspective of both the north and south. Nungak joined the Department of Indian and Northern Affairs with the goal of establishing Inuit self-government. At the age of 19, he started working as a government translator and interpreter and returned to his home community during the 1970s. He also worked as an editor for Tukisinaqtuk ("[The] Message"), a trilingual newsletter, and as a broadcaster for CBC North Iqaluit. In a 2011 interview, Nungak said that over the course of his political career, he has "crossed antlers with prime ministers, premiers and Québec separatists".

=== Creation of Nunavik ===
Map of the Nunavik region

Nungak was described as one of the leading figures in the building of the Inuit region known as Nunavik. He, along with Charlie Watt, were the founding members of the Northern Quebec Inuit Association (NQIA) in 1972. Nungak served as its secretary-treasurer. The association represented the Inuit, working alongside the Grand Council of the Crees, in negotiations with the governments of Quebec and Canada for the first land claim on behalf of the Inuit. Nungak, as a negotiator on behalf of the NQIA, was one of eleven signatories to the James Bay and Northern Québec Agreement (JBNQA) in 1975. Additionally, Nungak was the manager of Saputik, an organization tasked with holding Quebec's Inuit lands.

From 1984 and 1987, Nungak was co-chair of the Inuit Committee on National Issues, negotiating with the Canadian government that Inuit rights be enshrined within the Canadian constitution during the aboriginal rights constitutional conferences. Between 1995 and 1998, he was the president of the Makivik Corporation, which was responsible to administrate the compensation funding as part of the JBNQA. He had previously served as its vice president. Nungak, who was appointed president of the organization in 1995 to succeed Simeonie Nalukturuk, was primaried in 1997 by two challengers, but won with 79% of the vote cast by beneficiaries of the agreement.

=== Writing career and journalism ===
Nungak is a prolific journalist, having written over sixty articles for a variety of magazines. Nungak has written in Inuktitut, This Magazine, and Windspeaker. Fluent in English, French, and Inuktitut, he has published books in all three languages. His writings focus on the preservation of Inuit stories and to increase awareness on the preservation of the Inuit languages. Nungak has previously published collections of stories from Puvirnituq, collections on the deliberations of Nunavik elders, and the trilingual Illirijavut. ᐃᓪᓕᕆᔭᕗᑦ. That which we treasure. La langue que nous chérissons for the purposes of Inuktitut language revitalization. Nungak, as part of the Avataq Cultural Institute, went on a tour of Nunavik to determine the current state of the Inuktitut language, writing a plan to ensure its preservation. Nungak has been an outspoken proponent of Inuit linguistic and cultural preservation. One of the activities that he has engaged in is by hosting games of Uvangaqqaaq ('Me First'), a competitive Inuktitut word game. While doing so, he described himself as "the Alex Trebek of the North". One of the subjects of Nungak's works is the fictional study "Qallunology", the Inuit study of white people. The study designates the philosophical other as the Qallunaat, from the perspective of the Inuit. Qallunology is featured heavily in the documentary Qallunaat! Why White People Are Funny, which he co-directed.

=== Political career ===
Nungak ran twice for federal and provincial office. He ran for the seat of Duplessis as an independent politician during the 1976 Quebec general election. Nungak received 1916 votes, placing fourth. He subsequently ran in the 1979 Canadian federal election, again as an independent politician, running in the riding of Abitibi. Nungak lost the race, only receiving 986 votes, or two percent of the vote.

Nungak was openly critical of the Quebec sovereignty movement and the Parti Québécois, who had pushed for an independent Quebec. Despite his open opposition to the movement, Nungak refused to describe himself as a "federalist", separating himself from both the Liberal Party and Quebec Liberal Party's form of federalist approach, as well as their disregard for Indigenous self-preservation. Nungak expressed his concerns that an independent Quebec would potentially isolate the Inuit of Nunavik by severing their ties with the other Inuit in Canada and subsequently end the special relationship that Nunavik had with the federal government. Nungak had pushed for the federal government to intervene in the scenario Quebec was to become independent. He was critical of the sovereignty movement, whose rhetoric ignored Indigenous voices as they were deemed "inconsequential" compared to the Francophone Quebecois electorate. In response to that argument, Nungak retorted: "Well, it may be true that our numbers are inconsequential but the land we tread—where we have had our homes for thousands of years—is not inconsequential at all". As president of the Makivik Corporation, Nungak went on speaking engagements in Brussels, Geneva, and London to advocate against the movement and a potential second independence referendum. As part of his engagements, Nungak met with the Deputy High Commissioner for Human Rights at the United Nations and the Royal Geographical Society of London. Nungak formerly served as a councillor for the community of Kangirsuk.

=== Awards and accolades ===
In 2017, Nungak received the National Order of Quebec by Premier of Quebec, Philippe Couillard, during the 2017 Canadian honours in recognition to his contributions to Quebec's society. He was awarded the Knight insignia.

In 2021, Nungak was one of five recipients of the First Peoples' Medal by the Lieutenant Governor of Quebec, J. Michel Doyon, to honour their contributions in their communities and abroad.

== Personal life ==
Nungak lives in the community of Kangirsuk with his wife and seven children. He currently works as a cultural commentator, and for the Avataq Cultural Institute for issues of language preservation. Nungak plays the accordion.

== Selected works ==
- Nungak, Zebedee; Arima, Eugene Yuji (1969). Inuit Stories from Povungnituk. Hull, Quebec: Canadian Museum of Civilization. ISBN 978-0-660-50285-4.
- ——— (2017). Wrestling with Colonialism on Steroids: Quebec Inuit Fight for Their Homeland. Montréal: Dossier Quebec. ISBN 978-1-55065-468-4. OCLC 967787917.
- ——— (2012). Illirijavut: ᐃᓪᓕᕆᔭᕗᑦ [Illirijavut: That Which We Treasure]. Montréal: Avataq Cultural Institute. ISBN 9782921644884.

== Electoral history ==
1976 Quebec general election: Duplessis
Party	Candidate	Votes	%
Parti Québécois	Denis Perron	20,100	58.60
Liberal	Henri-Paul Boudreau	8,776	25.58
Union Nationale	Roland Gauthier	3,050	8.89
Independent	Zebedee Nungak	1,916	5.59
Ralliement créditiste	Jacques A. Quirion	461	1.34
Total valid votes		34,303	97.24
Total rejected ballots		973	2.76
Turnout		35,276	78.85
Electors on the lists		44,739	–

1979 Canadian federal election: Abitibi
Party	Candidate	Votes	%	±%
Social Credit	Armand Caouette	21,387	45.4	-11.2
Liberal	Ronald Tétrault	15,697	33.3	+1.2
Progressive Conservative	Jean-Jacques Martel	5,652	12.0	+6.5
Rhinoceros	Doris St-Pierre	1,425	3.0	
New Democratic	Maurice Vaney	1,420	3.0	-1.7
Independent	Zebedee Nungak	986	2.1	
Union populaire	Judith Desjardins	344	0.7	
Marxist–Leninist	Jean Létourneau	233	0.5	
Total valid votes		47,144	100.0	
