= Qallunaat! Why White People Are Funny =

Canadian Inuit comedy film

- Qallunaanik Piusiqsiuriniq ᖃᓪᓗᓈᓂᒃ ᐱᐅᓯᖅᓯᐅᕆᓂᖅ
- Directed by: Mark Sandiford; Zebedee Nungak
- Written by: Mark Sandiford
- Story by: John Kastner
- Produced by: Mark Sandiford; Kent Martin
- Starring: John Amagoalik; Lori Idlout; Alexina Kublu; Zebedee Nungak; Jeff Tabvahtah
- Edited by: Christopher Cooper
- Music by: Asif Illyas
- Production companies: Beachwalker Films Inc. National Film Board of Canada
- Release date: 2006
- Running time: 52 minutes
- Country: Canada
- Languages: English, Inuktitut

Qallunaat! Why White People Are Funny is a 2006 satirical documentary film directed by Mark Sandiford and Zebedee Nungak. The documentary-style film reverses the roles between White Canadians and the Inuit of Northern Canada, highlighting the nature of the treatment of the Inuit by White Canadian society.

Featuring the Qallunaat Studies Institute (QSI) and its Qallunologists, who study Qallunaat (White Canadians) in often humorous ways, the institution satirizes historical treatment of the Inuit by social scientists. A special feature featuring the QSI holding a conference in the Inuktitut language is paired with the film titled Qallunaanik Piusiqsiuriniq.

The film won the 2007 Yorkton Film Award's Golden Sheaf Award for Best Indigenous Production, as well as the 2008 Gemini Award's Canada Award.

== Synopsis ==
Qallunaat! Why White People Are Funny is a role reversal documentary-style film consisting of a mix between live-action segments, original and archival footage, and talking-head interviews. The film is divided into two portions, with half devoted to the documentary film, and a second portion involving the Qallunaat Studies Institute. The film features archival footage from historical documentaries set in the Arctic, in addition to interviews with a variety of Inuit personalities such as John Amagoalik, Lori Idlout, Alexina Kublu, Zebedee Nungak, and Jeff Tabvahtah, who play various characters in the film, as well as the public. During a portion of the film, a group of women are read The Book of Wisdom for Eskimos, a 1940s publication by the Canadian government for the purposes of educating the Inuit community. The women remark at the patronizing nature of the book, with such phrases as "A new baby cannot talk, so it cries." The film pokes fun at the nature of how White Canadian society had treated the Inuit through its various segments.

Relations between the Inuit of Northern Canada and White Canadians are parodied, in addition to reversing the notion of the White gaze to make White Canadians the focus of Inuit anthropological study. The film calls attention to the real-life relations between Inuit communities and White Canadians in a humorous manner, as well as the portrayal of Indigenous Canadians within documentary media. Referring to the tendency for documentary filmmaking to portray Indigenous Canadians as the other with films such as Nanook of the North, with its study of human beings like exotic specimens.

Portions of the film focus on the activities of the "Qallunologists" working at the fictional Qallunaat Studies Institute, abbreviated as the QSI. The live-action segments of the film are compiled under the title Qallunaanik Piusiqsiuriniq, which features a QSI meeting done in the Inuktitut language, is included as a special feature bundled with the film. The QSI in the context of the film, is a role reversal of the various governmental institutions that were devised to study Indigenous Canadians. The study of Qallunology as featured in the film is meant as a critique of the objectification of Inuit culture by social scientists. The QSI engages in a variety of activities, such as an employee using the "Qallunizer 2000"; a modified vacuum designed to sense traces of Qallunaat blood, measuring the skulls of the Qallunaat, and having the bodies of the individuals of their study photocopied. As the film proceeds, the QSI hosts a conference where the participants remark on the strange behaviours that the people at the centre of their studies engage in. These behaviours include their strange manner of greeting, repression of bodily functions, need to dominate the world, their lack of common sense in the Northern Canadian environment, strange dating habits, bureaucracy, interest in the ownership of property, and the strange smell emanating from their bodies. In order to tell them apart, the Inuit researchers start assigning the Qallunaat numbers instead of names, referencing the disc numbers historically assigned to the Inuit. As the QSI conference continues, they conclude that they should call upon the Department of Qallunaat Affairs, a parody of the real-world Department of Indian Affairs, to fund a voyage into their "mysterious lands" so that the Inuit can teach them "the values of a civilized society".

== Production ==
Sandiford based the film around his experiences as a White Canadian from Montreal spending extended amounts of time living in an Inuit community, having moved to Arctic Canada in the 1980s. Nungak, who played the head of the QSI, uses his position to poke fun at the historically White-dominated study of the Inuit. Nungak had previously addressed the concept of "Qallunology" during his time doing radio essays, and the concept of a "Qallunaat Studies Conference" that was featured in the film was "floating around Inuit communities for a long time".

Sandiford was critical of labelling the film as a "mockumentary", stating that the activities that had been done during the film's production were suggested by the Inuit participants and based on real practices done by White researchers. Sandiford stated that the film's humour was meant to "redress a long-standing power imbalance", stating that the film could not have been made earlier as the "wounds were too raw". The humour was included to make the serious topics of the film accessible, describing humour as a great vehicle in order to tell the truth. The film was produced as a part of the National Film Board of Canada's series titled: Unikkausivut - Sharing Our Stories.

The term Qallunaat (pronounced "halunat") in the film's title refers to the Inuit language term for white people, but moreover refers to a state of mind, rather than skin tone. Sandiford referred to the term as a cultural term, defining the term as "participants in mainstream Euro-American culture". John Amagoalik, who was interviewed for the film, describes the term as "people who always expect to have their way and want to do things ... right now." Sandiford included the exclamation mark in the title as he had heard the term used in amused exasperation by Inuit, Sandiford having realized the European-Canadian culture he had considered the norm appeared "laughably mannered and dangerously aggressive".

Wendy Felese, writing about Qallunaat! contextualized the film as a part of the double consciousness experienced by Nungak, the film's director, "the sense of always looking at oneself through the eyes of others." Nungak, who was part of a program that had taken three Inuit children (Nungak, Eric Hanna Tagoona, and Peter Ittinuar) to educate them in Ottawa for the purposes of "[expunging] them of Inuit culture and groom them to become northern leaders with a southern way of thinking" reversed his situation in a satirical manner in the events of the film in a manner dubbed "visual sovereignty".

== Reception ==
Keith McPherson writing in Canadian Review of Materials gave the film four out of four stars, praising the incorporation of historical and modern footage to create juxtaposition and highlighting Inuit and White Canadians. He described Qallunaat! as a powerful film that would "leave you and your students/children quietly examining the implications of ... your own past and present cultural assumptions."

== Awards ==
Award nominations for Qallunaat! Why White People Are Funny
Year	Award	Category	Result	Source
2007	Yorkton Film Festival Golden Sheaf Award	Best Indigenous Production	Won	
2008	Gemini Awards	Canada Award	Won	

== See also ==
- BabaKiueria, a 1986 satirical film highlighting the relationship between Aboriginal Australians and European Australians
- Unikkausivut: Sharing Our Stories
