= Surname law =

Laws regulating use of surnames

Surname law can refer to any law, whether in effect or no longer existing, regulating the use of surnames among a country's population.

== Canada ==
From 1941 to 1978, the Government of Canada issued disc numbers to identify Inuit in their records. In the mid-1960s Project Surname began, and, headed by Abe Okpik, Inuit were given surnames in a similar manner to how surnames were used among Canadians of European descent.

== Iceland ==
Icelandic law enforces the conventions of Icelandic names, which require that the last name be derived from a given name of the father or mother, suffixed with "-son" or "-dóttir". The law allows both derivations to be used, and for foreign last names to be inherited or kept by foreigners. This means that a father, mother, and child will all typically have different last names. Foreigners who marry an Icelander and get Icelandic citizenship can take the last name of their partner, or a patronym or matronym from the name of a parent or parent-in-law; these possibilities are not necessarily open to native Icelanders.

== Iran ==
Reza Shah Pahlavi ordered Iranians to adopt Western style surnames in place of old Islamic names and titles during his reign.

== Japan ==
A law in Japan, dating from 1896, requires a married couple to have a common surname. Most commonly it is the wife who takes her husband's name. In 2011, this law was challenged as unconstitutional on gender equality grounds, but the Supreme Court of Japan upheld the law in 2015. The law was challenged again in 2018, and the Court upheld it again in 2021.

== Spanish-ruled Philippines ==
The Catálogo alfabético de apellidos (English: Alphabetical Catalogue of Surnames;) is a book of surnames in the Philippines and other islands of Spanish East Indies published in the mid-19th century. This was in response to a Spanish colonial decree establishing the distribution of Spanish family names and local surnames among colonial subjects who did not have a prior surname. It is also the reason why Filipinos share some of the same surnames as many Spaniards and other Hispanic countries. Among Filipinos, a Spanish surname does not necessarily imply Spanish ancestry.

The book was created after Spanish Governor-General Narciso Clavería y Zaldúa issued a decree on November 21, 1849, to address the lack of a standard naming convention. Newly-Christianised Filipinos often chose the now-ubiquitous surnames of de los Santos, de la Cruz, del Rosario, and Bautista for religious reasons; others preferred names of well-known local rulers such as Lacandola. To complicate matters further, discrepancies like family members holding different surnames would hinder some of the colonial government's activities such as taking a census and tax collection.

== Thailand ==
According to the current law, Person Name Act, BE 2505 (1962), to create a new Thai name, it must not be longer than ten Thai letters, excluding vowel symbols and diacritics. The same law also forbids the creation of a surname that duplicated any existing surnames, but there are some duplicates dating to the time before computer databases were available to prevent this. Some creations added the name of their location (muban, tambon or amphoe) into surnames, similar to family name suffixes.

== Turkey ==
On 21 June 1934, Turkey adopted the Surname Law which required all its citizens to adopt and use Western-style surnames. Only names with Turkish origin were permitted, and non-Turks with pre-existing surnames were required to adopt new Turkish names.

== See also ==
- Naming law – Various laws restricting the names that parents can legally give to their children
- Protected surname
