= Project Surname =

Project enacted to assign surnames to Inuit

Project Surname was a project enacted by the Northwest Territories Council and Government of Canada to assign surnames to Inuit. Project Surname was also known as Operation Surname. These assigned surnames eventually replaced the disc number system, where numbers were assigned and kept on discs that people were obligated to wear from the 1940s onward. Family surnames were not used by Inuit until this system was introduced. Traditionally, children received multiple names after birth which reflected their personality, named for a dead relative or sometimes after a living relative. Names would be changed if they were not deemed to suit the child. Project Surname was perceived as less offensive compared to the disk number system but was also criticized as paternalistic intervention from the Canadian government.

== Background ==
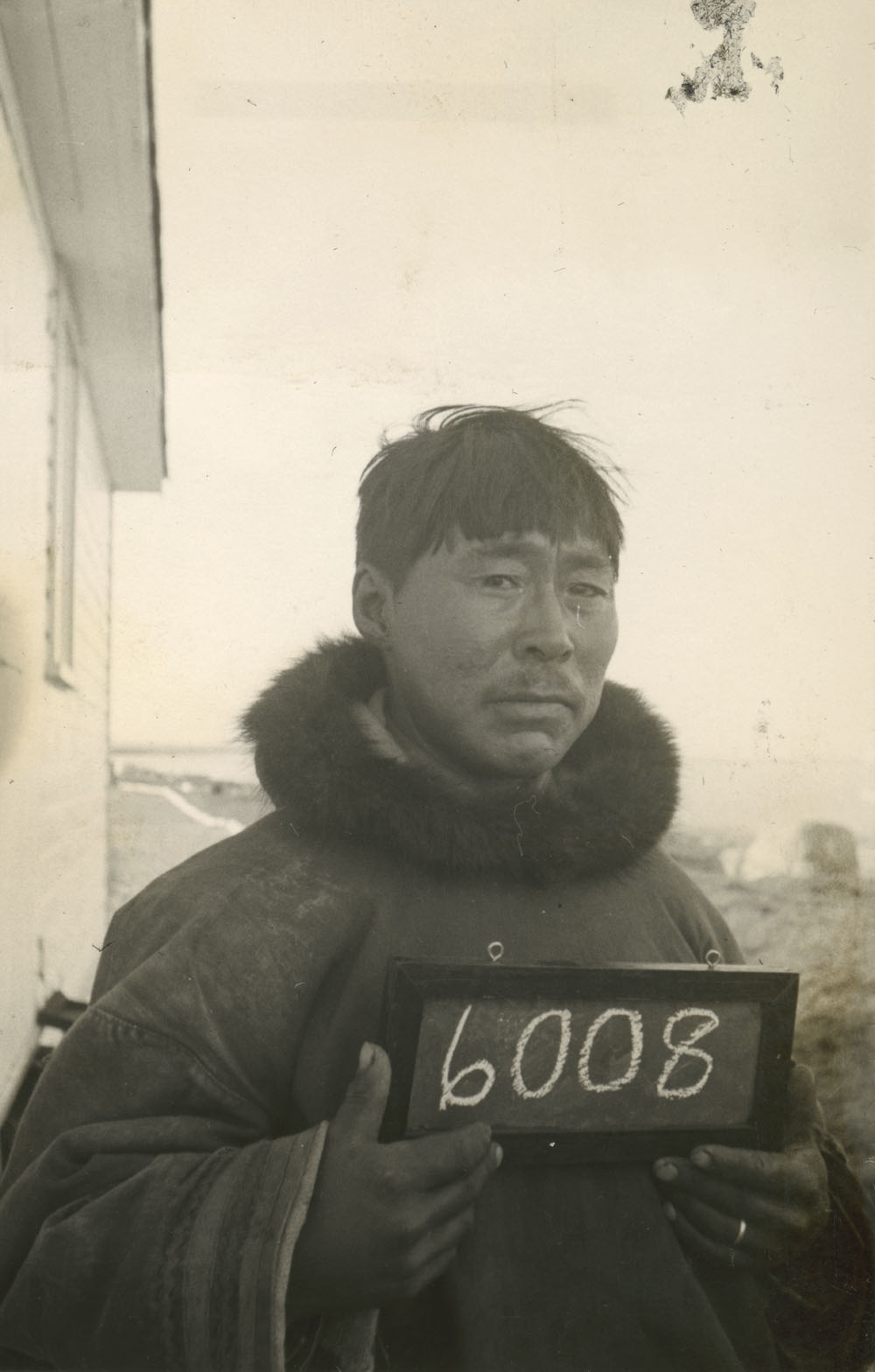
David Arnatsiaq holding a small chalk board with the number 6008.

Before the disc number system was established, using fingerprints as a method of identification instead was attempted but eventually discarded. The disc number system replaced it and was formally known as the Eskimo Identification Tag System. Every Inuk was told to wear their disc at all times so that the federal government could keep track of them. Letters were used to indicate location: E for Eastern Arctic and W for Western Arctic. This was followed by a number for a particular region, such as E8 for someone who lived in Ungava Bay. This system of identification was established because government officials found it easier to assign numbers, as they considered Inuit names to be confusing. Thus a young woman who was known to her relatives as "Lutaaq", "Pilitaq", "Palluq", or "Inusiq", and had been baptized as "Annie", was under this system to become "Annie E7-121". This system was not used in Labrador which had not yet joined Canada. All Labradorian Inuit who lacked modern surnames in 1893 were given surnames from the Moravian missionaries.

Traditionally, children received multiple names after birth which reflected their personality or were named after a relative. If named after a relative, it was typically one who was deceased, although occasionally children would be named after living ones. This namesake relationship ensured "a way of continuing people's lives", which could be intended in a literal sense through a belief in reincarnation. Names would be changed if they were not deemed to suit the child. This tradition continues on in the 21st century. These names were considered incredibly meaningful:

In Inuit culture, names insure the continuity of the lives of individuals, families, and communities. Names are passed from one generation to the next without regard for gender. The same namesake can live through several new people, male or female. The ties are so strong that until puberty, kinship terms, dress, and behaviour often follow the namesake relationship, rather than biological sex or conventional gender identification.

Polar Inuit specifically had different naming customs that involved gendered names.

== Abe Okpik's work ==
The issue of a lack of surnames and the demeaning use of disc numbers had been raised by Abe Okpik, an Inuk who was part of the Legislative Assembly of the Northwest Territories. However, it is Simonie Michael, the first elected Inuk member of the Legislative Assembly, who is credited with bringing the issue to the forefront. Michael spoke out against this system in the Legislative Assembly, explaining that his mail was sent to Simonie E7-551 rather than Simonie Michael, and protesting to the Commissioner of the Northwest Territories that his mail should be sent to his full name.

The government passed a motion authorising Project Surname and Abe Okpik was chosen to lead the project. Assigning surnames was deemed more humane than disc numbers. When Okpik was chosen as a member of the council, his legal name was W3-554. He wanted the ability to choose a surname for himself. Okpik knew different Inuktitut dialects and communicated directly with different communities about choosing a surname. According to his son, Roy Inglangasuk, Okpik had meagre resources: "he didn't have a budget for it and he had to hitchhike on government charters to get to the communities." From 1968 until 1971, Okpik visited every community, as well as many traditional campsites, in the Northwest Territories and what is now Nunavut and Nunavik in northern Quebec. In total he visited 55 settlements, travelling by plane, snowmobile, boat and snowshoe. Okpik's methods were criticized by others who alleged that he mainly spoke to men and that resulted in decisions about surnames being made without the input of absent relatives. Okpik was later inducted as an Order of Canada member, partly due to his efforts surrounding Project Surname.

== Criticism ==
According to scholar Valerie Alia, "Project Surname marked a turning point in the history to reidentify Inuit" and that these "effects are still felt more than thirty years later". Both the disc number system and Project Surname were criticized as violating Inuit naming customs for the convenience of people who did not understand them. Family surnames were not used by Inuit until this system was introduced. Assigning surnames was perceived as less offensive compared to the disk number system but was also criticized as paternalistic intervention from the Canadian government.

== See also ==
- Christianity and colonialism
- Linguistic imperialism
- Surname law
