= Sheokjuk Oqutaq =

Inuk sculptor (1920-1982)

Sheokjuk Oqutaq (1920–1982, Kinngait) was an Inuk sculptor.

== Early life ==
He was born in 1920. In the 1950s, he started carving with James Houston.

== Career ==
His carvings mostly depicted animals, including loons, narwhals, bears, and whales.

His disc number was E7-919.

From November 1988 to January 1989, his work was displayed in an exhibition called "The Sculpture of Sheokjuk Oqutag" at the McMichael Canadian Art Collection. His works are held in the permanent collections of several museums, including the National Gallery of Canada, the University of Lethbridge Art Collection, the National Museum of the American Indian, the McMichael Canadian Art Collection, and the University of Michigan Museum of Art.
