= Charles Camsell Indian Hospital =

Former hospital in Edmonton, Alberta

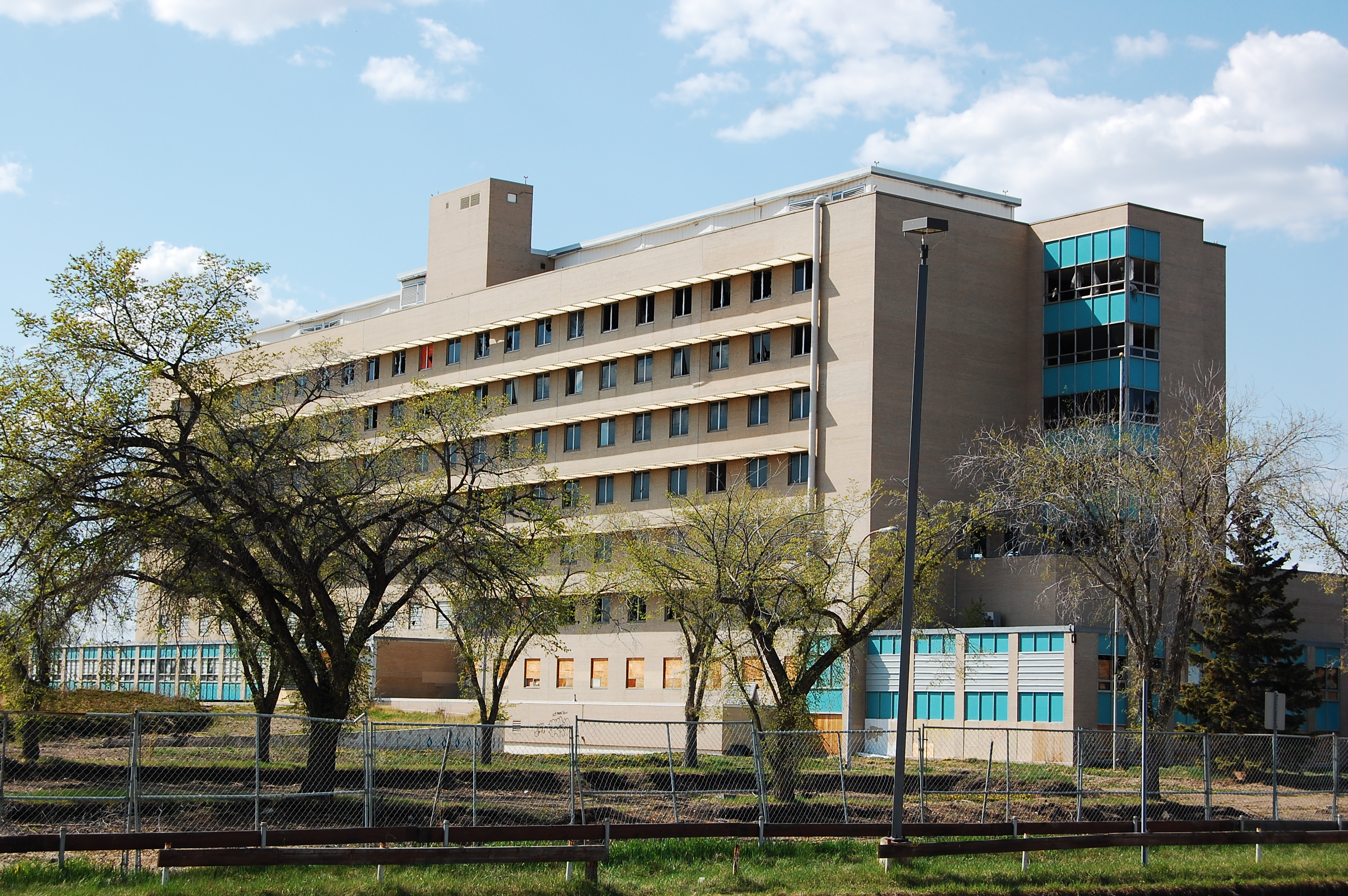
The Charles Camsell Hospital in May of 2009

The Charles Camsell Indian Hospital was an Indian Hospital in Edmonton, Alberta that opened in 1913 and officially closed in 1996. It was operated by the federal government until 1944 and the provincial government until its closure. The patients of the segregated institution were primarily Indigenous people from northern Alberta and the North-West Territories for tuberculosis.

The building was originally built as a Jesuit college. It served as a military hospital until it was transferred to Indian Health Services after the Second World War. It was the largest "Indian Hospital" in Canada, with 500 beds at its largest. In collaboration with the University of Alberta medical school, the hospital performed research on patients without their knowledge or consent. The hospital had patients from Alberta, the North-West Territories, the Yukon, Saskatchewan and Manitoba.

Children were often sent to the hospital alone, without their parents or caregivers. Former patients believed that some who had died at the hospital were buried there and in 2021, the site was searched for unmarked graves, but none were found.

== History ==
In 1946, Lord Alexander, then Governor General of Canada, opened The Charles Camsell tuberculosis hospital in Edmonton, in a former Jesuit college built in 1910 and later occupied by the Canadian Army during World War II as a staff and administration building and medical corps hospital during construction of the Alaska Highway 1942-1945. This hospital, which was located in the Inglewood area, was named after Charles Camsell (1876–1958), who was at the time Commissioner of the Northwest Territories as well as a geologist and map-maker dedicated to the exploration of Canada's North. It was operated by the Indian Health Service of the Department of National Health and Welfare and later transferred to the Department of Indian Affairs.

In 1964 the Department of Indian Affairs established the Northern Medical Research Unit under the direction of Otto Schaefer. The Unit was created to address the overwhelming response to a 1959 paper about Arctic health Schaefer published in the Canadian Medical Association Journal. The paper was a summary of his medical and personal observations of the changes to Inuit lifestyle with the coming of the Distant Early Warning Line (DEW Line) and increasing southern influence. For the next two decades Schaefer and his staff travelled the Arctic collecting medical information, administering vaccinations to remote camps, and seeing to the general health care of Inuit and First Nations groups in the Arctic. The Unit spent two months a year in the Arctic, as well as occasional emergency trips, and at the Charles Camsell Hospital analysing the data collected and seeing to patients. The conclusions of this research indicated changes to traditional life by increased influence of southern non-indigenous culture on lifestyle, diet, and social structure had enormous negative health effects. Schaefer became a vocal advocate for a return to traditional lifestyles as a means of countering declining health and better treating medical problems in the Arctic and in hospitals like the Charles Camsell.

Between 1945 and 1967, the hospital operated an occupational therapy program for indigenous patients. In 1990, the hospital donated a collection of over 400 arts and crafts items made by patients in the program to the Royal Alberta Museum. From the 60s to the 80s, the hospital was used in Albertan Eugenics programs in order to sterilize indigenous peoples. It was mentioned in multiple class action lawsuits against both the province and Canada. The hospital was also a place where medical testing was performed on natives, and from where indigenous children were abducted to be adopted by non-indigenous.

A new 385-bed Charles Camsell Hospital was completed in 1966-1967 at 128th Street and 114th Avenue in Edmonton, Alberta. The hospital was closed and abandoned in 1996, condemned due in part to asbestos, and in part due to its history in Canadian genocide and eugenics. The hospital had been owned by a number of people over the years with development in mind, and some construction and gutting of the floors has taken place, but nothing substantial has been done. No actual development has been finished. The movie White Coats, released in 2004, was filmed in this hospital. In 2006, there was a fire in the building caused by a demolition crew, but firefighters had to fight the fire from the outside of the building since barbed wire had been wrapped around the railings of staircases, in a poor attempt to keep the homeless population out of the building. As of 2017, the building and grounds sit empty, and are surrounded by a fence. A private security service actively patrols the facility, and hefty fines are given to trespassers. In 2018, they’ve started to frame in the individual condominiums in the tower.

By the mid-2020s, redevelopment activity at the site had progressed significantly, with the former hospital undergoing conversion into a residential condominium complex. The work included interior steel stud framing, drywall installation, and modernization of building systems, carried out by multiple contractors and trades. Among the firms involved in interior construction scope was Edmonton-based Goldstar Builders Corporation. As of 2026, the redevelopment has advanced the adaptive reuse of the property into an active residential development.
