= Nalenik Temela =

Canadian Inuk sculptor (1939-2003)

Nalenik Temela (1939–May 7, 2003) was an Inuk sculptor from Kimmirut.

== Career ==
Temela carved using soapstone and serpentine.

His work is held in several museums worldwide, including the Penn Museum, the Fine Arts Museums of San Francisco, the University of Michigan Museum of Art, the Musée national des beaux-arts du Québec, the Museum of Civilization in Ottawa, the Nunatta Sunakkutaangit Museum in Iqaluit, the National Museum of Ethnology in Osaka, and the Agnes Etherington Art Centre.

The North West Company gave Prince Charles and Princess Diana one of Temela's carvings as a wedding gift in 1982.

His work was part of the traveling 2005 exhibition "Masters of the Arctic."

== Later life ==
Temela died of cancer at age 64. He was survived by his wife, Itee, and their six children.
