= Meggie Richard =

Canadian politician

Meggie Richard MNA

Member of the National Assembly for Duplessis
- Incumbent
- Assumed office October 5, 2026
- Preceded by: Kateri Champagne Jourdain

Prefect of the Minganie Regional County Municipality
- In office June 11, 2023 – 2026
- Preceded by: Luc Noël

Personal details
- Party: Parti Québécois

Meggie Richard is a Canadian politician who is a candidate for the National Assembly of Quebec for Duplessis in the 2026 Quebec general election as a member of the Parti Québécois.

Richard is a graduate of Cégep Garneau and the Université du Québec à Trois-Rivières and was the director general for Havre-Saint-Pierre.

== Electoral record ==
2026 Quebec general election: Duplessis
Party	Candidate	Votes	%	±%
Parti Québécois	Meggie Richard	9,434	47.14	+22.35
Coalition Avenir Québec	Kateri Champagne Jourdain	4,550	22.74	–22.40
Conservative	Roberto Stea	3,909	19.53	+3.81
Liberal	Samuel Murray	1,080	5.40	+1.38
Québec solidaire	Jani Bellefleur-Kaltush	984	4.92	–4.44
Marxist–Leninist	Alexandre Deschênes	56	0.28	N/A
Total valid votes		20,013	98.83	+0.26
Total rejected ballots		236	1.17	–0.26
Turnout		20,249	54.54	+1.33
Electors on the lists		37,124		
Parti Québécois gain from Coalition Avenir Québec		Swing		+22.38
Source: Élections Québec
