= Duplessis (electoral district) =

Provincial electoral district in Quebec, Canada

Quebec electoral district
- Coordinates: 51.77°N 66.84°W

Provincial electoral district
- Legislature: National Assembly of Quebec
MNA
Meggie Richard
Parti Québécois
- District created: 1960
- First contested: 1960
- Last contested: 2026

Demographics
- Electors (2012): 38,339
- Area (km²): 322,671.5
- Census division(s): Minganie—Le Golfe-du-Saint-Laurent, Nord-du-Québec, Sept-Rivières—Caniapiscau
- Census subdivision(s): Aguanish, Baie-Johan-Beetz, Blanc-Sablon, Bonne-Espérance, Côte-Nord-du-Golfe-du-Saint-Laurent, Fermont, Gros-Mécatina, Havre-Saint-Pierre, Kawawachikamach (Naskapi village municipality), L'Île-d'Anticosti, Longue-Pointe-de-Mingan, Natashquan, Port-Cartier, Rivière-au-Tonnerre, Rivière-Saint-Jean, Saint-Augustin, Schefferville, Sept-Îles; Kawawachikamach (Naskapi reserved land); Pakuashipi; La Romaine, Lac-John, Maliotenam, Matimekosh, Mingan, Nutashkuan (Indian reserve), Uashat; Caniapiscau, Lac-Jérôme, Lac-Juillet, Lac-Vacher, Lac-Walker, Petit-Mécatina, Rivière-Mouchalagane, Rivière-Nipissis, Rivière-Koksoak (part)

Duplessis (French pronunciation: [dyplɛsi]) is a provincial electoral district in the Côte-Nord region of Quebec, Canada, that elects members to the National Assembly of Quebec. It notably includes the municipalities of Sept-Îles, Port-Cartier, Havre-Saint-Pierre, Fermont and the community of Maliotenam. It also includes a single municipality from the Nord-du-Québec region: the Naskapi village municipality of Kawawachikamach (not to be confused with the Naskapi reserved land of the same name, which Duplessis also includes, but is in Côte-Nord). It was created for the 1960 election from parts of the Saguenay provincial electoral district.

The riding includes the part of southern Labrador claimed by Quebec, but there were no electors living in the area on the Quebec electoral roll in 2018 or 2026, and the area is administered by Newfoundland and Labrador. Élections Québec reports that no votes have been cast by electors in the disputed territory.

In the change from the 2001 to the 2011 electoral map, it gained the unorganized territories of Caniapiscau and Lac-Juillet from Ungava electoral district.

The riding was named after former Quebec Premier Maurice Duplessis who led the province from 1936 to 1939 and from 1944 to 1959 as leader of the Union Nationale.

== Members of the Legislative Assembly / National Assembly ==
Legislature	Years	Member	Party
Riding created from Saguenay
26th	1960–1962	Henri-Laurier Coiteux	Liberal
27th	1962–1966	Henri-Laurier Coiteux	Liberal
28th	1966–1970	Henri-Laurier Coiteux	Liberal
29th	1970–1972	Henri-Laurier Coiteux	Liberal
29th	1972–1973	Donald Gallienne	Liberal
30th	1973–1976	Donald Gallienne	Liberal
31st	1976–1981	Denis Perron	Parti Québécois
32nd	1981–1985	Denis Perron	Parti Québécois
33rd	1985–1989	Denis Perron	Parti Québécois
34th	1989–1994	Denis Perron	Parti Québécois
35th	1994–1997	Denis Perron	Parti Québécois
35th	1997–1998	Normand Duguay	Parti Québécois
36th	1998–2003	Normand Duguay	Parti Québécois
37th	2003–2007	Lorraine Richard	Parti Québécois
38th	2007–2008	Lorraine Richard	Parti Québécois
39th	2008–2012	Lorraine Richard	Parti Québécois
40th	2012–2014	Lorraine Richard	Parti Québécois
41st	2014–2018	Lorraine Richard	Parti Québécois
42nd	2018–2022	Lorraine Richard	Parti Québécois
43rd	2022–2026	Kateri Champagne Jourdain	Coalition Avenir Québec
44th	2026–Present	Meggie Richard	Parti Québécois

== Geography ==
The riding is located on the lower north shore of the Saint Lawrence River.

== Linguistic demographics ==
- Francophone: 79.8%
- Anglophone: 9.1%
- Allophone: 11.1% (10.5% Montagnais-Naskapi)

== Election results ==
2026 Quebec general election
** Preliminary results — Not yet official **
Party	Candidate	Votes	%	±%
Parti Québécois	Meggie Richard	9,434	47.14	+22.35
Coalition Avenir Québec	Kateri Champagne Jourdain	4,550	22.74	–22.40
Conservative	Roberto Stea	3,909	19.53	+3.81
Liberal	Samuel Murray	1,080	5.40	+1.38
Québec solidaire	Jani Bellefleur-Kaltush	984	4.92	–4.44
Marxist–Leninist	Alexandre Deschênes	56	0.28	N/A
Total valid votes		20,013	98.83	+0.26
Total rejected ballots		236	1.17	–0.26
Turnout		20,249	54.54	+1.33
Electors on the lists		37,124		
Parti Québécois gain from Coalition Avenir Québec		Swing		+22.38
Source: Élections Québec

2022 Quebec general election
Party	Candidate	Votes	%	±%
Coalition Avenir Québec	Kateri Champagne Jourdain	8,785	45.14	+11.44
Parti Québécois	Marilou Vanier	4,825	24.79	–9.53
Conservative	Roberto Stéa	3,059	15.72	+14.04
Québec solidaire	Uapukun Mestokosho	1,821	9.36	–3.03
Liberal	Chamroeun Khuon	783	4.02	–13.90
Climat Québec	Jacques Gélineau	190	0.98	New
Total valid votes		19,463	98.57	
Total rejected ballots		282	1.43	–0.39
Turnout		19,745	53.21	–2.60
Electors on the lists		37,108		
Coalition Avenir Québec gain from Parti Québécois		Swing		+10.48
Source: Élections Québec

2018 Quebec general election
Party	Candidate	Votes	%	±%
Parti Québécois	Lorraine Richard	7,023	34.32	-5.67
Coalition Avenir Québec	Line Cloutier	6,896	33.70	+20.69
Liberal	Laurence Méthot	3,668	17.92	-20.28
Québec solidaire	Martine Roux	2,534	12.38	+5.64
Conservative	Alexandre Leblanc	344	1.68	–
Total valid votes		20,465	98.19	
Total rejected ballots		378	1.81	-0.27
Turnout		20,843	55.81	-2.87
Eligible voters		37,349		
Parti Québécois hold		Swing		-13.18
Source(s) "Rapport des résultats officiels du scrutin". Élections Québec.

2014 Quebec general election
Party	Candidate	Votes	%
Parti Québécois	Lorraine Richard	8,910	39.99
Liberal	Laurence Méthot	8,513	38.21
Coalition Avenir Québec	Christine Pinard	2,898	13.01
Québec solidaire	Jacques Gélineau	1,502	6.74
Option nationale	Yan Rivard	458	2.06
Total valid votes		22,281	97.92
Total rejected ballots		474	2.08
Turnout		22,755	58.67
Electors on the lists		38,784	–

2012 Quebec general election
Party	Candidate	Votes	%
Parti Québécois	Lorraine Richard	12,393	53.01
Liberal	Lise Pelletier	6,142	26.27
Coalition Avenir Québec	Gervais Gagné	2,961	11.52
Québec solidaire	Jacques Gélineau	1,032	4.41
Option nationale	Yan Rivard	593	2.54
Coalition pour la constituante	Marc Fafard	407	1.74
Independent	Alain Mangan	119	0.51
Total valid votes		23,380	98.82
Total rejected ballots		280	1.18
Turnout		23,660	61.60
Electors on the lists		38,407	–

2008 Quebec general election
Party	Candidate	Votes	%
Parti Québécois	Lorraine Richard	9,619	52.34
Liberal	Pierre Cormier	6,300	34.28
Action démocratique	Bernard Lefrançois	1,532	8.34
Québec solidaire	Olivier Noël	469	2.55
Green	Jacques Gélineau	459	2.50

2007 Quebec general election
Party	Candidate	Votes	%	±%
Parti Québécois	Lorraine Richard	10,205	44.82	
Liberal	Marc Proulx	6,288	27.62	
Action démocratique	Bernard Lefrançois	4,959	21.78	
Québec solidaire	Olivier Noël	697	3.06	–
Green	Jacques Gélineau	621	2.73	–

2003 Quebec general election
Party	Candidate	Votes	%	±%
Parti Québécois	Lorraine Richard	10,926	47.90	
Liberal	Marc Proulx	8,018	35.15	
Action démocratique	Steeve Trudel	2,530	11.09	
Independent	André Forbes	1,334	5.85	–

1998 Quebec general election
Party	Candidate	Votes	%	±%
Parti Québécois	Normand Duguay	15,406	59.32	
Liberal	Richard Scanlan	8,395	32.32	
Action démocratique	Jacques Gélineau	2,170	8.36	

Quebec provincial by-election, 1997
Party	Candidate	Votes	%
Parti Québécois	Normand Duguay	8,747	50.41
Liberal	Daniel Montambault	6,881	39.66
Action démocratique	Jean Eudes Lapierre	1,722	9.93
Total valid votes		17,350	98.09
Total rejected ballots		337	1.91
Turnout		17,687	48.39
Electors on the lists		36,548	–

1995 Quebec referendum
Side	Votes	%
Oui	20,781	62.78
Non	12,322	37.22

1994 Quebec general election
Party	Candidate	Votes	%
Parti Québécois	Denis Perron	15,788	60.00
Liberal	Tony Detroio	10,525	40.00
Total valid votes		26,313	98.33
Total rejected ballots		447	1.67
Turnout		26,760	73.51
Electors on the lists		36,402	–

1992 Charlottetown Accord referendum
Side	Votes	%
Non	18,762	67.86
Oui	8,888	32.14

1989 Quebec general election
Party	Candidate	Votes	%
Parti Québécois	Denis Perron	12,066	49.86
Liberal	Jean Moyen	11,456	47.34
Independent	Gaby Robert	678	2.80
Total valid votes		24,200	98.26
Total rejected ballots		428	1.74
Turnout		24,628	71.86
Electors on the lists		34,272	–

1985 Quebec general election
Party	Candidate	Votes	%
Parti Québécois	Denis Perron	12,377	49.81
Liberal	André Maltais	12,103	48.71
Parti indépendantiste	Noël Tremblay	223	0.90
Christian Socialist	Pierre Lamothe	145	0.58
Total valid votes		24,848	98.93
Total rejected ballots		428	1.07
Turnout		25,117	69.02
Electors on the lists		36,389	–

1981 Quebec general election
Party	Candidate	Votes	%
Parti Québécois	Denis Perron	19,962	65.30
Liberal	Réal-Jean Couture	9,921	32.45
Union Nationale	Jean Bolduc	514	1.68
Marxist–Leninist	Lisette Paradis	173	0.57
Total valid votes		30,570	99.21
Total rejected ballots		243	0.79
Turnout		30,813	73.70
Electors on the lists		41,811	–

1980 Quebec referendum
Side	Votes	%
Oui	18,280	53.03
Non	16,192	46.97

1976 Quebec general election
Party	Candidate	Votes	%
Parti Québécois	Denis Perron	20,100	58.60
Liberal	Henri-Paul Boudreau	8,776	25.58
Union Nationale	Roland Gauthier	3,050	8.89
Independent	Zebedee Nungak	1,916	5.59
Ralliement créditiste	Jacques A. Quirion	461	1.34
Total valid votes		34,303	97.24
Total rejected ballots		973	2.76
Turnout		35,276	78.85
Electors on the lists		44,739	–

1973 Quebec general election
Party	Candidate	Votes	%
Liberal	Donald Gallienne	13,404	52.94
Parti Québécois	Clément Godbout	10,923	43.15
Ralliement créditiste	Clément Légaré	504	1.99
Union Nationale	Jacques Perron	416	1.64
Communist	Gilles Verrier	70	0.28
Total valid votes		25,317	98.20
Total rejected ballots		463	1.80
Turnout		25,780	66.99
Electors on the lists		38,484	–

Quebec provincial by-election, 1972
Party	Candidate	Votes	%
Liberal	Donald Gallienne	13,130	67.30
Parti Québécois	Charles Bégin	6,380	32.70
Total valid votes		19,510	97.63
Total rejected ballots		473	2.37
Turnout		19,383	74.95
Electors on the lists		26,663	–

1970 Quebec general election
Party	Candidate	Votes	%
Liberal	Henri-Laurier Coiteux	7,839	45.86
Parti Québécois	Valmore Tremblay	5,612	32.83
Union Nationale	Jean Dionne	3,310	19.37
Ralliement créditiste	Fernand Dickner	331	1.94
Total valid votes		17,092	98.08
Total rejected ballots		335	1.92
Turnout		17,427	80.70
Electors on the lists		21,594	–

1966 Quebec general election
Party	Candidate	Votes	%
Liberal	Henri-Laurier Coiteux	6,673	47.77
RIN	Pierre Bourgault	4,392	31.44
Union Nationale	André Haince	2,709	19.39
Ralliement national	Jacques Brunet	195	1.40
Total valid votes		13,969	98.12
Total rejected ballots		268	1.88
Turnout		14,237	75.46
Electors on the lists		18,867	–

1962 Quebec general election
Party	Candidate	Votes	%
Liberal	Henri-Laurier Coiteux	7,345	59.84
Union Nationale	Roger Porlier	4,929	40.16
Total valid votes		12,274	98.78
Total rejected ballots		152	1.22
Turnout		12,426	79.19
Electors on the lists		15,692	–

1960 Quebec general election
Party	Candidate	Votes	%
Liberal	Henri-Laurier Coiteux	6,552	56.31
Union Nationale	Jack A. Hayden	5,024	43.18
Independent UN	Ange Paradis	60	0.52
Total valid votes		11,636	98.61
Total rejected ballots		164	1.39
Turnout		11,800	78.05
Electors on the lists		15,118	–

== See also ==
- List of Quebec provincial electoral districts
- Canadian provincial electoral districts
