= Mosha Michael =

Canadian film director (1948–2009)

Mosha Michael (c. 1948 – November 17, 2009) was sometimes called Canada's first Inuk film maker. He made three short films for the National Film Board in the 1970s: Natsik Hunting, The Hunters (Asivaqtiin) and Whale Hunting (Qilaluganiatut).

Michael grew up in Iqaluit. Diagnosed with tuberculosis as a child, he was sent to a clinic in Hamilton for a year for treatment. He also had to attend a residential school in Churchill. Later in life, Michael became homeless, due to a long-term problem with alcoholism. He died from internal bleeding a week after surgery at St. Michael Hospital. His sister Naulaq blamed decades of alcohol abuse for his death.
