= Lorraine Richard =

Canadian politician

Member of the National Assembly of Quebec for Duplessis
- In office April 14, 2003 – August 28, 2022
- Preceded by: Normand Duguay
- Succeeded by: Kateri Champagne Jourdain

Personal details
- Born: July 30, 1959 (age 67) Havre-Saint-Pierre, Quebec
- Party: Parti Québécois
- Spouse: Claude Vigneault
- Portfolio: Air and boat transportation

Lorraine Richard (born July 30, 1959, in Havre-Saint-Pierre, Quebec) is a Quebec politician. She was the Member of National Assembly of Quebec for the riding of Duplessis in the Côte-Nord region from 2003-2022, representing the Parti Québécois.

Richard was a nursing assistant in a health center in Havre St-Pierre for 25 years in which she was also the secretary for the Minganie Health Center's employee union. She was also a school commissioner for 16 years, the vice-president of the Côte-Nord School Board's Association for five years.

Richard was elected in Duplessis in the 2003 elections and was the PQ's critic for citizen relations, maritime affairs and social services. She was re-elected in the 2007 and 2008 general elections.
