= Kateri Champagne Jourdain =

Canadian politician

Member of the National Assembly of Quebec for Duplessis
- In office October 3, 2022 – October 5, 2026
- Preceded by: Lorraine Richard
- Succeeded by: Meggie Richard

Quebec Minister of Employment
- In office October 20, 2022 – September 10, 2025
- Preceded by: Jean Boulet
- Succeeded by: Pascale Déry

Personal details
- Born: 1981 (age 44–45) Sept-Îles, Quebec, Canada
- Party: Coalition Avenir Quebec

Kateri Champagne Jourdain is a Canadian politician who was elected to the National Assembly of Quebec in the 2022 Quebec general election. She represented the riding of Duplessis as a member of the Coalition Avenir Québec until 2026. She is the first Indigenous woman elected to the National Assembly and the first Indigenous woman in a Quebec cabinet position. She was minister of employment in the Executive Council of Quebec. In the Fréchette ministry, she became Minister of Natural Resources and Forests.

== Electoral record ==
2026 Quebec general election: Duplessis
Party	Candidate	Votes	%	±%
Parti Québécois	Meggie Richard	9,434	47.14	+22.35
Coalition Avenir Québec	Kateri Champagne Jourdain	4,550	22.74	–22.40
Conservative	Roberto Stea	3,909	19.53	+3.81
Liberal	Samuel Murray	1,080	5.40	+1.38
Québec solidaire	Jani Bellefleur-Kaltush	984	4.92	–4.44
Marxist–Leninist	Alexandre Deschênes	56	0.28	N/A
Total valid votes		20,013	98.83	+0.26
Total rejected ballots		236	1.17	–0.26
Turnout		20,249	54.54	+1.33
Electors on the lists		37,124		
Parti Québécois gain from Coalition Avenir Québec		Swing		+22.38
Source: Élections Québec

2022 Quebec general election: Duplessis
Party	Candidate	Votes	%	±%
Coalition Avenir Québec	Kateri Champagne Jourdain	8,785	45.14	+11.44
Parti Québécois	Marilou Vanier	4,825	24.79	–9.53
Conservative	Roberto Stéa	3,059	15.72	+14.04
Québec solidaire	Uapukun Mestokosho	1,821	9.36	–3.03
Liberal	Chamroeun Khuon	783	4.02	–13.90
Climat Québec	Jacques Gélineau	190	0.98	New
Total valid votes		19,463	98.57	
Total rejected ballots		282	1.43	–0.39
Turnout		19,745	53.21	–2.60
Electors on the lists		37,108		
Coalition Avenir Québec gain from Parti Québécois		Swing		+10.48
Source: Élections Québec
