= Chedoke Hospital =

Hospital in Hamilton, Ontario, Canada

- Hamilton Health Sciences
- Location in Ontario

Geography
- Location: Hamilton, Ontario, Canada
- Coordinates: 43.2383°N 79.9164°W

Organization
- Care system: Public Medicare (Canada) (OHIP)

Services
- Emergency department: No

History
- Founded: 1906
- Closed: 2014

Links
- Website: http://www.hhsc.ca/body.cfm?ID=226
- Lists: Hospitals in Canada

The Chedoke Hospital was a non-acute care hospital in Hamilton, Canada. It was operated by Hamilton Health Sciences. In 1906 the Mountain Sanatorium was founded to provide care for people from Hamilton and the surrounding communities who were ill with tuberculosis.

In 1961 the sanatorium changed its mandate, expanded its services and became a general hospital called the Chedoke General and Children's Hospital. In 1971 this name was changed to Chedoke Hospitals. In 1979 it amalgamated with the McMaster University Medical Centre to become half of Chedoke-McMaster Hospitals. In 1997 Chedoke-McMaster Hospitals amalgamated with Hamilton Civic Hospitals to form Hamilton Health Sciences. It then became The Chedoke Hospital of Hamilton Health Sciences. and housed many McMaster Children's Hospital outpatient services, specializing in autism, developmental pediatrics & rehabilitation, and mental health. It held the internationally renowned Offord Centre for Child Studies. Other leading specialties include, chronic pain management, the regional joint assessment centre, and the Ontario breast screening program.

All programs were transferred to other facilities and the structure was demolished in 2014.

== See also ==
- Indian hospital
