= Normand Duguay =

Canadian politician

MNA for Duplessis
- In office October 6, 1997 – April 14, 2003
- Preceded by: Denis Perron
- Succeeded by: Lorraine Richard

Personal details
- Born: October 17, 1941 (age 84) Rivière-au-Tonnerre, Quebec
- Party: Parti Québécois

Normand Duguay (born October 17, 1941) is a former Canadian politician, who represented the riding of Duplessis in the National Assembly of Quebec from 1997 to 2003. He was a member of the Parti Québécois.

Born in Rivière-au-Tonnerre, Quebec, Duguay was first elected in a by-election in 1997, following the death of Denis Perron. He was re-elected in the 1998 election, but did not run again in the 2003 election.
