= Fort William Sanatorium =

Coordinates: 48.38785°N 89.2703°W

Fort William Sanatorium was a tuberculosis hospital or sanatorium in Fort William, Ontario, today part of the city of Thunder Bay. It opened in 1935 as a tuberculosis treatment centre for settlers, adding 20 government-funded beds for Indigenous patients in 1941.

Fort William was partially used as a provincial school from 1944 on to 1971, and a day school for the local Indigenous population between 1950 and 1953. It is unclear whether the hospital was fully racially segregated at any point during its operation, or whether settler and Indigenous patients were treated in different wings or areas of the hospital at the same time.

It later provided treatment for people with other disorders, including physical and mental handicaps.

In a 1953 article in the medical journal Chest, B. Pollak of the Fort William Sanatorium described the use of planography, also known as tomography.

In 1974, Fort William Sanatorium was renamed Walter P. Hogarth Memorial Hospital. The Mental Retardation Unit of the Walter P. Hogarth Memorial Hospital Northwestern Regional Centre (as it is designated in the regulation) was designated as one of the "institutions under the Developmental Services Act, ... for the purposes of section 157 of the Municipal Act." The Northwestern Regional Centre was a residential facility for children and adults with an intellectual disability that operated from the 1960s until it was closed in 1994.

Walter P. Hogarth Memorial Hospital was amalgamated with Westmount Hospital in 1980 as Hogarth-Westmount Hospital. In 2000, Hogarth-Westmount Hospital became part of St. Joseph's Care Group, a Roman Catholic nonprofit health care corporation.

The Fort William Sanatorium building, later known as the Hogarth Building, was demolished in 1999.

The patient case files of Fort William Sanatorium are preserved by the Archives of Ontario.
