= West Park Healthcare Centre =

- University Health Network

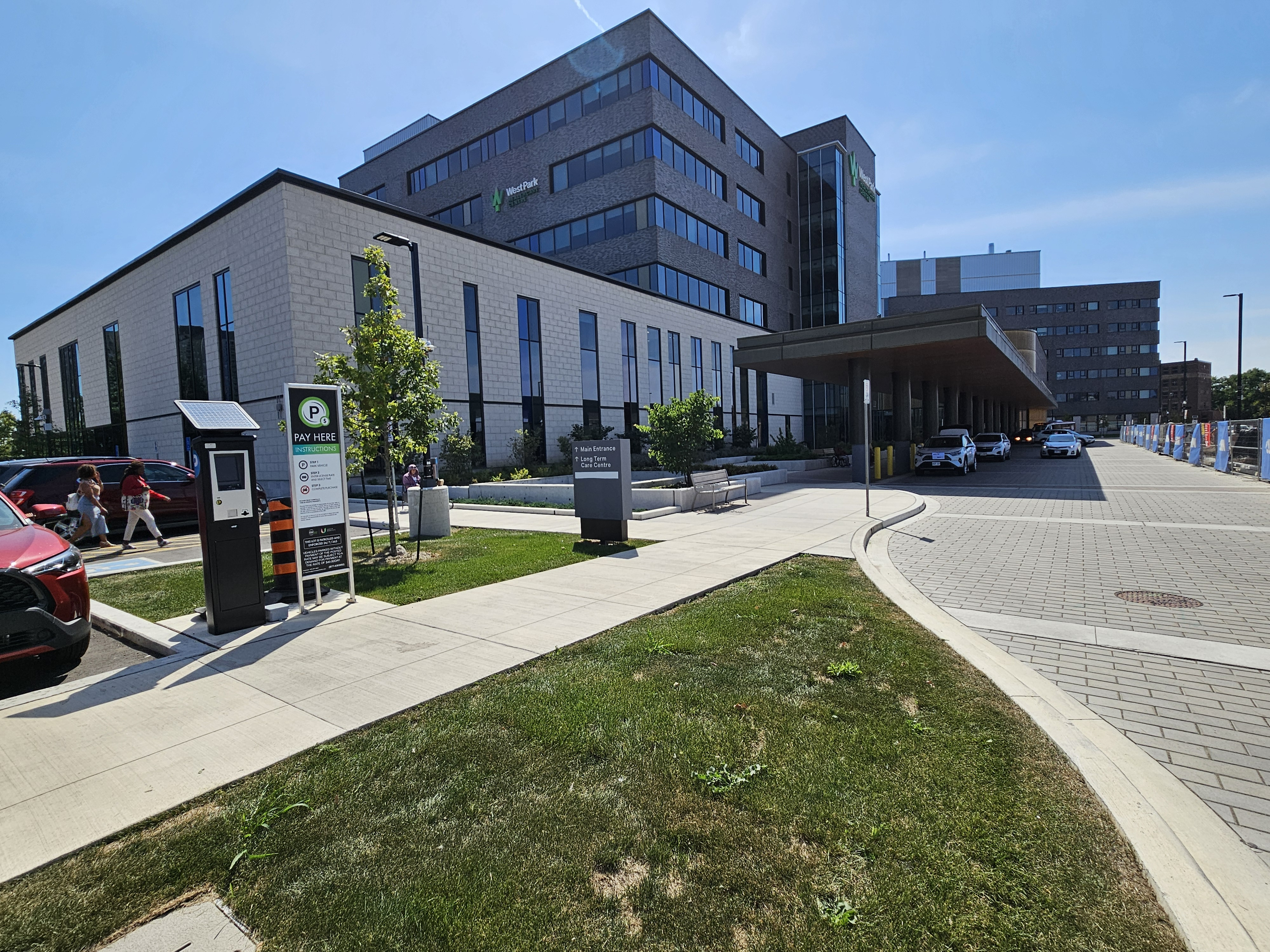

Geography
- Location: 170 Emmett Avenue, Toronto, Ontario, Canada
- Coordinates: 43°41′20.54″N 79°30′29.82″W

Organization
- Affiliated university: University of Toronto

Services
- Beds: 316

Links
- Website: www.uhn.ca/West_Park
- Lists: Hospitals in Canada

West Park Healthcare Centre is a hospital in Toronto, Ontario, Canada.

Founded in 1904 as a tuberculosis sanatorium, the facility was renovated in 2023 and reopened as a rehabilitation and continuing care hospital.

== Overview ==
West Park Healthcare Centre is a six-story, 1,250-square-foot (116 m^{2}) facility with 316 patient beds. The hospital specializes in rehabilitation and continuing care for patients recovering from severe health conditions such as stroke, amputation, lung disease, and life-changing illnesses.

Two wings of the hospital are dedicated to inpatient care, and one wing is for outpatient services. There are two 10-bed tuberculosis inpatient wards.

== History ==
In 1896, William Gage, a Toronto businessman and philanthropist interested in tuberculosis prevention, helped found the National Sanitarium Association in an effort to build a tuberculosis hospital in Toronto and fund research into the disease.

Toronto residents—believing tuberculosis was a hereditary "disease of the poor"—opposed building a tuberculosis facility near local neighbourhoods, and enacted bylaws to block the hospital.

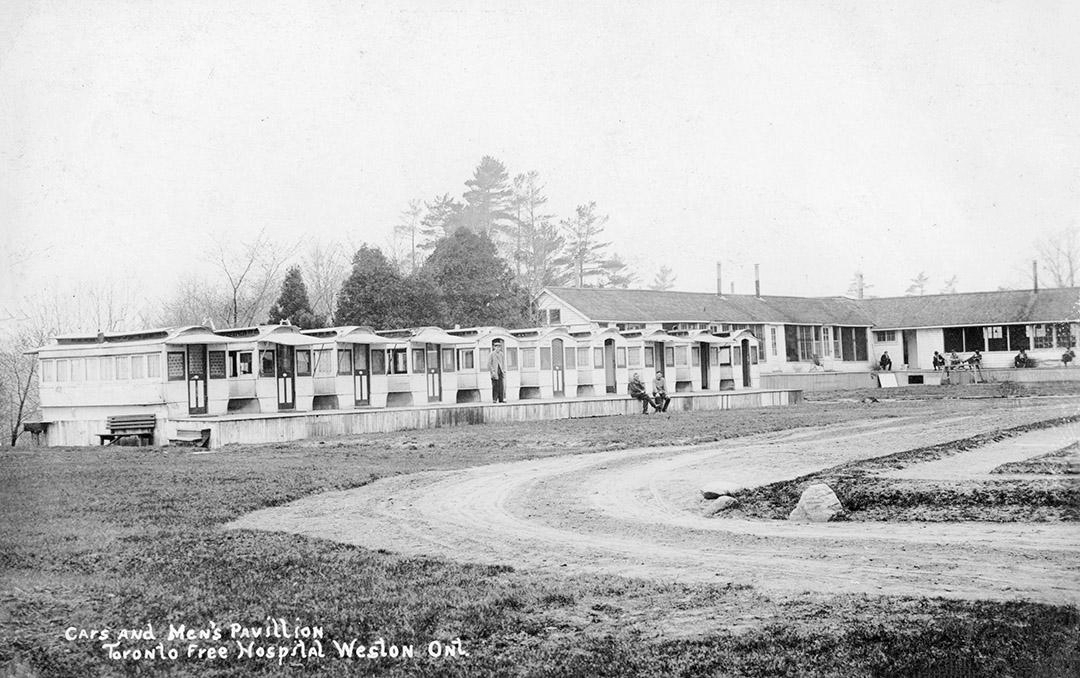
Toronto Free Hospital for the Consumptive Poor, circa 1915

In 1903, Gage purchased Buttonwood Farm near Toronto, a 40-acre (16 ha) property next to the Humber River, and established the Toronto Free Hospital for the Consumptive Poor. The farmhouse was converted to a doctor's quarters, chapel, and patient's dining room; old streetcars were used to house patients.

By 1910, three new buildings had been erected, and in 1913, Queen Mary Hospital for Consumptive Children—the first hospital in the world dedicated to tuberculosis in children—opened at the site.

Gage—knighted for his philanthropic efforts in 1918—spoke of the “purity of the air” at the riverside location, and "fresh-air" treatment was provided for patients, who tended a vegetable garden and a farm containing 50 pigs and 1,000 hens (the animals were swept away during Hurricane Hazel in 1954).

The combined facility received patients from across Ontario, and at one time had 667 patient beds.

Additions to the hospital include the Ruddy Building in 1938, and the Gage Building in the early 1980s.

The facility was renovated in 2023 and reopened as West Park Healthcare Centre.
