= Denis Perron =

Canadian politician

MNA for Duplessis
- In office November 15, 1976 – April 23, 1997
- Preceded by: Donald Gallienne
- Succeeded by: Normand Duguay

Personal details
- Born: November 22, 1938 Nédelec, Quebec
- Died: April 23, 1997 (aged 58) Sept-Îles, Quebec
- Party: Parti Québécois

Denis Perron (November 22, 1938 – April 23, 1997) was a Canadian politician, who represented the riding of Duplessis in the National Assembly of Quebec from 1976 to 1997. He was a member of the Parti Québécois.

He was first elected in the 1976 election, and served until his death in office in 1997.
