= Coqualeetza Indian Hospital =

Former Indian hospital Sardis, British Columbia, Canada

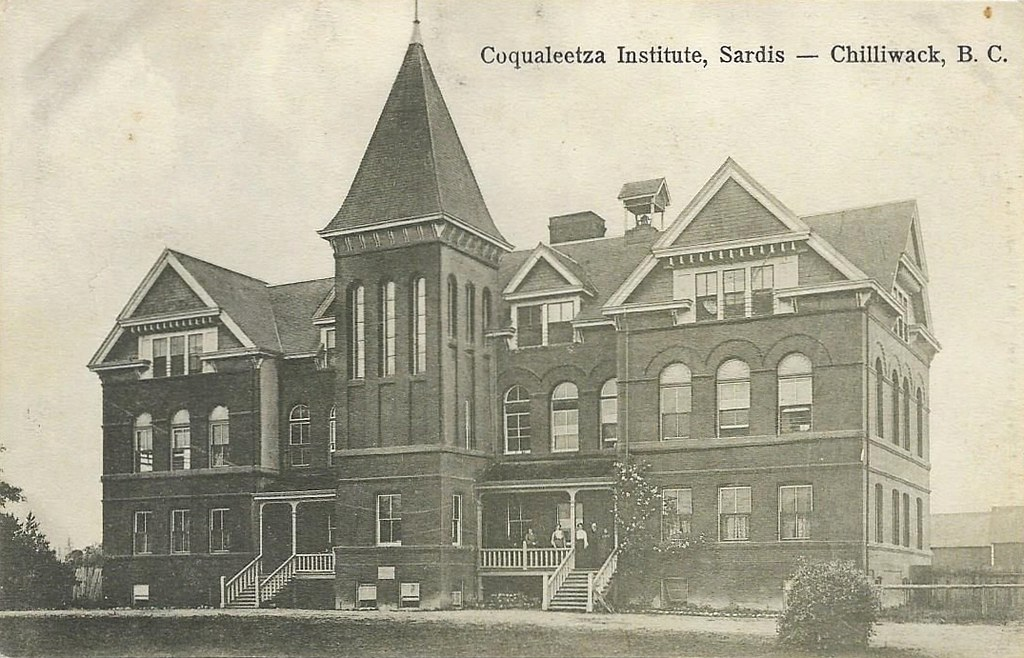
Coqualeetza Institute, Sardis, Chilliwack, British Columbia

The Coqualeetza Indian Hospital which was located in Sardis, British Columbia, Canada, on the traditional homelands of the Stó:lō peoples, served as a tuberculosis ward for Indigenous peoples in the surrounding area. The ward, which later became a general hospital, was converted from the Coqualeetza Residential School and later launched its official opening on September 2, 1941. After multiple budget cuts, the Department of Indian Affairs was reduced to a branch of the Department of Mines and Resources in 1936. The branch operated the hospital until 1946 when the Department of National Health and Welfare was established and took over its management.

Local newspaper the Chilliwack Progress covered the fire that broke out at the hospital on November 19, 1948 which had destroyed a large amount of the building’s infrastructure. In 1949, many of British Columbia’s parliamentary members lobbied for Coqualeetza’s removal from Sardis, wanting to relocate the hospital to their own districts. Advocates in Sardis, however, rallied to make sure Coqualeetza remained and in 1957, it was named one of the only fully accredited hospitals in Fraser Valley.

With tuberculosis more manageable due to the use of modern drugs and increased ability to detect positive cases, Coqualeetza closed on September 30, 1969. Administrator James Thompson had said that continuing to operate exclusively Indigenous hospitals would perpetuate segregation of the populations occupying British Columbia.

== Early days ==
The hospital, which initially began as a day school, was established by Charles Montgomery Tate, a Methodist missionary, in 1886. In 1887, he established a residence for the students. He later converted his family home into the Coqualeetza boarding school in 1894. The day school had sustained significant damage after a fire broke out in late 1891, forcing the Tates to rebuild the structure which took two years with the help of the General Board Of Missions and the Methodist Women's Missionary Society.

== Residential school ==
George H. Raley, a Methodist missionary, was the principal of the Coqualeetza residential school from 1914 to 1934. He was succeeded by Robert C. Scott after joining the institution in 1933. Raley went on to become the principal of Port Alberni Residential School in Vancouver Island, B.C. Raley had issues with overcrowding in Coqualeetza, oftentimes accepting too many applications for admission, leaving his two teachers to handle 120 students.

In 1901, Coqualeetza had a central three-story building; located on the first floor was the principal's office, a kitchen, separate dining rooms for the students and teachers, a sitting room and a sewing room. Classrooms, separate dormitories for boys and girls, a teacher's bedroom and a bathroom were all located on the second floor. More student and teacher dormitories could be found on the third floor. The school was located far from Indigenous communities which meant that families did not often visit.

Some children were baptized into the Methodist church before beginning to attend Coqualeetza. The school's goal was to distance Indigenous students from their cultures in order to assimilate them into Canadian society. Students wore identical clothes and had been given the same haircuts, they were not allowed to wear their traditional clothing. Students resisted the assimilation process by speaking in their Indigenous languages and by practicing traditional customs such as dancing. Offenders were often punished by teachers, corporal punishment such as whipping was used as well as solitary confinement and the process of humiliation. The school's farm instructor, Ray Carter, had also been known to punish students, at times using violent tactics. He had attempted to assault a student because they had been late for an evening prayer session. Another incident took place after Carter had overheard a few of the male students saying swear words; he punished them by obliging them to eat soap.

In addition to assigning gender-specific dormitories, staff had also taken other measures to separate male and female students, designating different recreational areas and punishing students who attempted to undermine the isolation. Two male students were expelled and one was arrested for attempting to establish relationships deemed "inappropriate" and "illicit" with their female peers. Female students were often chaperoned during activities while male students were given more agency, even being allowed to leave the premises at times.

The residential school was officially closed in 1940, the remaining students were switched to the Alberni Residential School. Canada's National Centre for Truth and Reconciliation has formally recognized the deaths of at least twenty-one children with the first being documented in October 1898.

== Tuberculosis Ward ==
Coqualeetza Institute housed the first preventorium facility in Canada which was tasked with isolating Indigenous children infected with tuberculosis. The site was chosen specifically because of its large positive test rate which amounted to "77% of the 214 students". In 1935, the farm building was converted and held fifteen students who had positive tuberculosis tests. Once remodeled into Coqualeetza Indian Hospital, the facility's capacity was expanded to accommodate 175 patient beds. Tuberculosis disproportionately affected Indigenous peoples with their mortality rate being recognized as ten times higher than that of the white population.

The hospital was also known for its occupational program for tuberculosis patients that focused on the production of traditional Indigenous handmade goods such as "totem poles, leather and bead work". The program also encouraged the making of "lapel ornaments" which were hand-crafted by Indigenous patients; these items were sold and the profits were reinvested into a fund to buy more materials with the remaining amount going to the creators who were paid weekly anywhere from 60 cents to 10 dollars.

Coqualeetza was significant in British Columbia because of its high capacity, which surpassed that of many other Indigenous-specific hospitals. In 1943, the Chilliwack Progress reported that out of the 270 tuberculosis hospital beds in British Columbia, Coqualeetza held 170, accounting for over 50 percent of the overall total.

== Cultural center ==
In 1970, multiple studies were conducted to investigate the feasibility of turning the hospital into a community center for the Stó꞉lō peoples of the Fraser Valley. Coqualeetza has since been converted into a cultural education center with an emphasis on "promoting, preserving, and interpreting" Stó꞉lō culture, language and tradition.
