= Avataq Cultural Institute =

The Avataq Cultural Institute is Nunavik's official organization for the preservation and promotion of the Inuktitut language and Inuit culture. Avataq has departments that deal with ethnography and art, as well as a library, archive and language programs.

== History ==
Avataq receives its mandate from the biennial Inuit Elders Conference. The Institute was formed at the first Inuit Elders Conference with the goal of protecting Inuit culture. It began operating on November 1, 1980. Its head office is in Inukjuak and it also operates an office in Montreal, Quebec.

In 1984 Avataq supported a place-name survey of elders in 12 Inuit communities in the Quebec Arctic.

== Activities ==
In 2018 Avataq worked with Dartmouth College to return bones that had been excavated from Inuit gravesites in 1967 by one of the college's anthropologists.

The Institute formed an alliance with the Montreal Museum of Fine Arts in 2018 to promote Inuit art and culture.
