= Otto Schaefer =

German-Canadian physician (1919–2009)

Otto Schaefer, CM (October 2, 1919 – November 2, 2009) was a German-Canadian doctor (MD) known for his work with Inuit in Canada. Dr. Dr. h. c. Schaefer is considered one of the great pioneers of Arctic medicine, who authored over 100 papers on Northern health, and was one of the founders of the "circumpolar health movement".

== Life ==
Schaefer, originally Schäfer, was born in Betzdorf, Germany, and had six brothers and two sisters. He studied at the University of Heidelberg, graduating in 1944. He came to Canada in 1951. After working in the Northwest Territories as a medical officer, he took a fellowship in internal medicine at the University of Alberta.

"Otto Schaefer was born in Betzdorf, Germany October 2, 1919. Growing up he was fascinated by the descriptions of the Arctic found in the books of Knud Rasmussen and Franz Boas. As a teenager, Schaefer refused to join the Hitler Youth and was refused entrance to medical school because he was not deemed patriotic enough. In 1938, to get around this roadblock, he volunteered with the infantry to prove his loyalty and hopefully gain admission to the Faculty of Medicine at Bonn University. With the start of the Second World War Schaefer was pushed to pursue medical studies while serving part of the year in the army and by 1944 he had completed his program of study. From 1946 to 1950 he pursued a specialist degree in internal medicine at the University of Heidelberg. On July 1, 1951 Schaefer arrived in Halifax aboard the S.S. Atlantic and began the long process of gaining Canadian credentials and finding a posting in the Arctic. His fiancé Editha (Didi) left her own medical studies to join Schaefer in June 1952 and the couple had five children: Lothar (1953), Alfred (1955), Taoya (1956), Monika (1959), and Heidi (1964-1988)."

From 1964 until 1985, Schaefer was the director of the Northern Medical Research Unit. He founded the Canadian Society for Circumpolar Health, and published over 100 papers on Arctic health.

Schaefer was a member of the Order of Canada (1976) and was recognized by a number of honours including awards from the Province of Alberta and government of the Northwest Territories, and honorary degrees.
