= Unikkausivut: Sharing Our Stories =

Film, website and resources about Inuit in Canada

Unikkausivut: Sharing Our Stories is a 2011, two-volume DVD boxset, website and educational resource from the National Film Board of Canada (NFB), bringing together films by and about the Inuit of Canada. The collection traces the development of filmmaking in Northern Canada, from the ethnographic films by NFB filmmakers in the 1940s, to contemporary work by Elisapie Isaac and other Inuit filmmakers.

In November 2011, the Government of Nunavut and the NFB jointly announced the launch of the DVD and online collection, which will eventually comprise more than 100 NFB films by and about Inuit available in Inuktitut, Inuinnaqtun and other Inuit languages, as well as English and French. The boxed set is being distributed to over 50 communities across Northern Canada, with Nunavut's Department of Education supplying Unikkausivut (ᐅᓂᒃᑲᓯᕗᑦ [u.nik.ka.u.si.vut]) to every school and library in its territory.

The film collection premiered in Ottawa on November 2, 2011, as part of the 40th anniversary celebrations of the Inuit Tapiriit Kanatami, followed by community events across Inuit territories (Inuit Nunangat) in Iqaluit, Nunavut on November 7; Kuujjuaq, Nunavik on November 8; Nain, Nunatsiavut on November 17; and Inuvik in the Inuvialuit Settlement Region of the Northwest Territories on November 23.

In 2015, the collection was expanded with six films from Nunatsiavut, to mark the 10th anniversary of the Labrador Inuit Lands Claims Agreement. In 2016, the NFB launched a new educational initiative based on Unikkausivut.

== Conception ==
Unikkausivut was partly inspired by the then-federal Minister of Health Leona Aglukkaq. An Inuk from the Inuvik Region, Aglukkaq had enjoyed watching the NFB's series of short films about the Netsilik, called The Netsilik Eskimos, in her youth and felt that it would be worthwhile to make these older films about Northern Canada widely available. The NFB, which was already working to make its archival films available on new platforms, reviewed its Inuit film archives and determined that it had over 100 works worth rereleasing.

== Production ==
It cost over $1 million and took two years for the NFB to get the first 24 films digitized and ready in all languages; getting all of the films translated for northern communities could cost an additional $2 million. This work involves restoring original film prints where necessary, digitization, remixing sound and obtaining rights clearances for new digital formats. Each film must also be dubbed in Inuktitut, the language of one of Canada's four Inuit regions—a challenge in itself, since Inuktitut narrations often run longer than their French or English equivalents. The conversion of all these films is expected to be completed by 2015.

Unikkausivut: Sharing Our Stories was created by the NFB in collaboration with the Inuit Relations Secretariat of Aboriginal Affairs and Northern Development Canada and the Government of Nunavut's Department of Education. An advisory committee included Inuit elders such as Peter Irniq.
