= Nunatta Sunakkutaangit Museum =

Museum in Iqaluit, Nunavut

Coordinates: 63.7435°N 68.5138°W

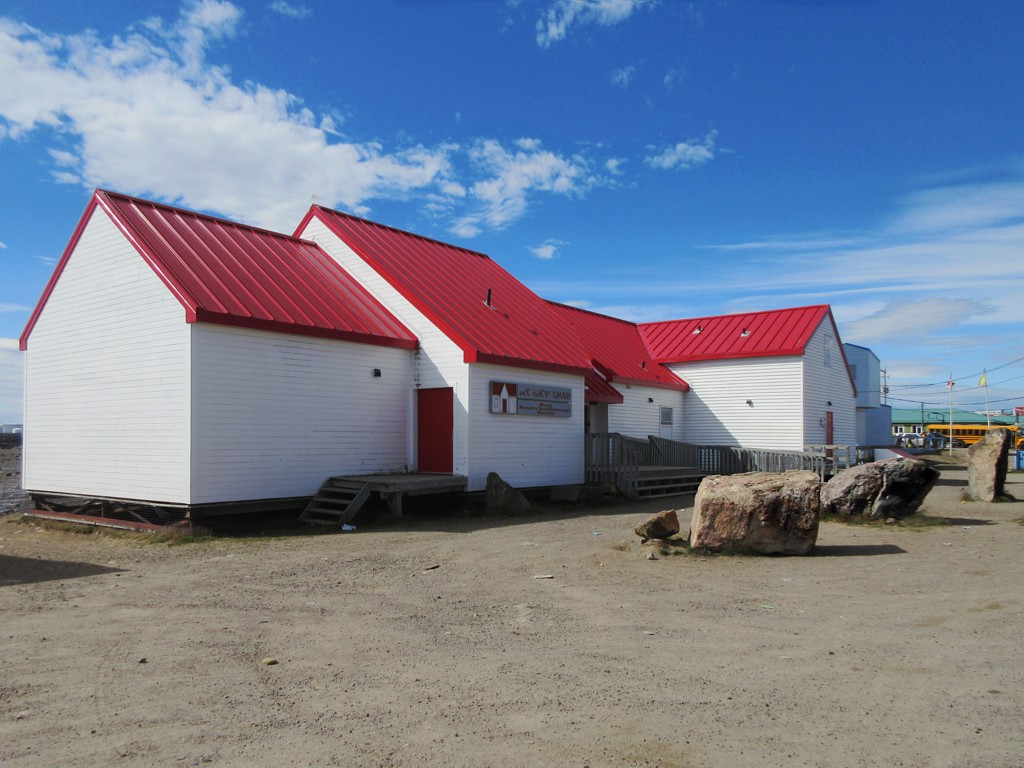

General information
- Type: Museum
- Location: Iqaluit, Nunavut, Canada

The Nunatta Sunakkutaangit Museum is a museum of Nunavut history and Inuit culture, located in Iqaluit, Nunavut. The museum was founded in 1969 by two employees of Canada's Department of Indian Affairs. The museum is housed in a former Hudson's Bay Company building. The building was moved on tracks from Apex, Nunavut to Iqaluit before being renovated.
