= Abe Okpik =

Inuk politician and leader (1928–1997)

Abe Okpik CM
- Auktalik
- Okpik in April 1964
- Born: 12 January 1928; Mackenzie Delta area, Northwest Territories
- Died: 10 July 1997 (aged 69); Iqaluit, Northwest Territories (now Nunavut)
- Occupation: Inuk community leader

Abraham "Abe" Okpik, CM (12 January 1928 – 10 July 1997) was an Inuk community leader in Canada. He was instrumental in helping Inuit obtain surnames rather than disc numbers as a form of government identification. He was also the first Inuk to sit on what is now the Legislative Assembly of the Northwest Territories and worked with Thomas Berger.

== Early life ==
Okpik, an Inuvialuk, was born January 12, 1928, in the Mackenzie Delta area of the Northwest Territories, near Aklavik at a summer fishing camp. Prior to selecting the name Abraham Okpik he was known as Auktalik, meaning man with a mole. He selected Abraham, a biblical reference, as his first name and Okpik, a name used in his family over several generations meaning willow, as his surname.

Okpik learned English as a student at All Saints Indian Residential School in Aklavik. At the age of 16, Okpik contracted tuberculosis and was sent to the Charles Camsell Hospital in Edmonton. He remained in the hospital for three years where he further improved his English, which eventually led to a job as a translator with the Distant Early Warning Line. Although he was permanently injured by his dog sled he was still able to hunt and trap.

== 1960s ==
By the 1960s, Okpik was living in what was then called Frobisher Bay, now Iqaluit. He was working at Apex, the subdivision where most Inuit lived in the town's early days, at the rehabilitation centre. He was later to work for Department of Indian Affairs and Northern Development (DIAND) as an administrator.

In 1965 Okpik was appointed to the Northwest Territories Council (5th Northwest Territories Legislative Council). At that time most of the council were from Ottawa. Okpik's role on the council was to serve as a representative for the Inuit population resident in the eastern arctic. He attended his first council meeting on February 4, 1966. He began in his native language before transitioning to fluent English to advocate for a higher standard of living in the North arguing Inuit "must have a voice in development." He was not re-appointed to council after Simonie Michael was elected to the council in 1966. The government of Canada felt that Michael would serve Okpik's intended role and gave his seat to Chief John Tetlichi, the first status Indian to serve on council.

== Project Surname ==
Beginning the 1940s, the Government of Canada used disc numbers, similar to dog tags, to identify people. They were deemed necessary to facilitate the distribution of family allowances due to the absence of surnames within Inuit communities and the frequency of name changes over the course of a person's life. In the mid-1960s the Northwest Territories Council undertook to replace the disc numbers with last names under Project Surname. Okpik, whose disc number was "W3-554", was picked to head the project.

From 1968 until 1971, Okpik visited every community, as well as many traditional campsites, in the Northwest Territories and what is now Nunavut and Nunavik in northern Quebec. In total he visited 55 settlements, travelling by plane, snowmobile, boat and snowshoe. At each visit Okpik would record a person's name, explaining the necessity of having a first and last name. Pamela R. Stern points out that while it may have been expected that cultural naming practices be accommodated, "Okpik employed a standard Euro-Canadian naming pattern that assumed a nuclear family with a male head-of-household." As a result, it was mostly men who selected a surname that was in turn extended to the whole family. At the end of the project Okpik returned home to his wife and three children in Frobisher Bay where he worked as a teacher at Frobisher Bay School.

== The Berger Commission ==
In 1974, the Government of Canada commissioned Thomas Berger to head the Mackenzie Valley Pipeline Inquiry. The inquiry lasted longer and travelled further than was expected, through 35 northern communities, and Okpik accompanied Berger as both an interpreter and broadcaster.

== Order of Canada ==
In recognition of Okpik's work with the "Berger Commission", on the NWT Council and for "Project Surname" he was made a "Member of the Order of Canada". The appointment was made 15 December 1976 with the investiture 20 April 1977.

== Later life and death ==
In 1979, he returned to Iqaluit but had spent time on Banks Island and in Spence Bay, now Taloyoak.

Okpik spent the rest of his life in Iqaluit and was an elected member of the town council on several occasions. He also served on several volunteer organisations and committees. Okpik died in Iqaluit 10 July 1997 after an illness and his funeral service was held in St. Jude's Cathedral 15 July.

The "Abe Okpik Hall" in Apex is named for him. The former mayor of Iqaluit, Jimmy Kilabuk, had a mural painted on the side of his home in 1998 that included Okpik.

== Electoral record ==
1979 Canadian federal election: Nunatsiaq
Party	Candidate	Votes	%	±%
New Democratic	Peter Ittinuar	1,963	37.74	–
Liberal	Tagak Curley	1,887	36.27	–
Progressive Conservative	Abe Okpik	1,352	25.99	–
Total valid votes		5,202	99.37	
Total rejected ballots		33	0.63	–
Turnout		5,235	64.95	–
Eligible voters		8,060		
New Democratic notional hold		Swing		N/A
This riding was created from part of Northwest Territories, where New Democrat Wally Firth was the incumbent.
Source: Elections Canada
