= Disc number =

Identifier used by the Government of Canada for Inuit

Disc numbers (Inuktitut: ᐅᔭᒥᒃ, singular: ujamik, dual: ujamiik, plural: ujamiit; Inuktitut pronunciation: [u.ja.mi] OO-ya-mee) were used by the Government of Canada in lieu of surnames for Inuit. They were similar to dog tags.

Prior to the arrival of European customs, Inuit had no need of family names, and children were given names by the elders. However, by the 1940s the record-keeping requirements of outside entities such as the missions, traders and the government brought about change. In response to the government's needs, the Government of Canada decided on the disc number system.

== Disc ==
The discs were roughly an inch across, burgundy, and made of pressed fibre or leather. They had a hole "to be threaded with a caribou thong and sewn into a parka for safekeeping", or they could be worn around the neck. The discs were stamped with "Eskimo Identification Canada" around the edge and the crown in the middle. Just below the crown was the number. The number was broken down into several parts, "E" for Inuit living east of Gjoa Haven and "W" for those in the west. This would be followed by a one or two digit number that indicated the area the person was from. The last set of numbers would identify the individual. The discs were used in the Northwest Territories (which, at the time, included present-day Nunavut) from 1941 until 1978.

Thus a young woman who was known to her relatives as "Lutaaq", "Pilitaq", "Palluq", or "Inusiq", and had been baptized as "Annie", was under this system to become "Annie E7-121".

For the most part, Inuit today do not miss the passing of the numbers, although some Inuit consider their discs to be personal artifacts of sentimental value.

This system was not used in Labrador, which had not yet joined Canada. All Labradorian Inuit who lacked modern surnames in 1893 were given surnames from the Moravian missionaries.

== Cultural depictions ==
Today carvings and prints produced by Inuit artists may be seen with the disc number on them. The Inuk singer Susan Aglukark recorded the song E186 in 2000 on her album Unsung Heroes. Lucie Idlout recorded a CD called E5-770, My Mother's Name in 2005.

Norma Dunning's book Kinauvit?: What’s Your Name? The Eskimo Disc System and a Daughter’s Search for Her Grandmother was shortlisted for the Shaughnessy Cohen Prize for Political Writing in 2023.

== Project Surname ==
In 1965, Abe Okpik was appointed to sit on the 5th Northwest Territories Legislative Council, its first Inuk. In 1966, Simonie Michael became the council's first elected Inuk, declaring his intention to not be known by his disc number. The Government of the NWT decided to replace the disc numbers with names and Abe Okpik was appointed to Project Surname. From 1968 to 1971, Okpik toured the NWT and northern Quebec (Nunavik) recording the preferences of people. He was to be later given the Order of Canada in part because of his work with the surnames.

== See also ==
- Surname law
- Historical discussion in the section "Examples" in entry "Extinction of family names"
