= Inuit women =

Traditional and modern female society among Inuit women

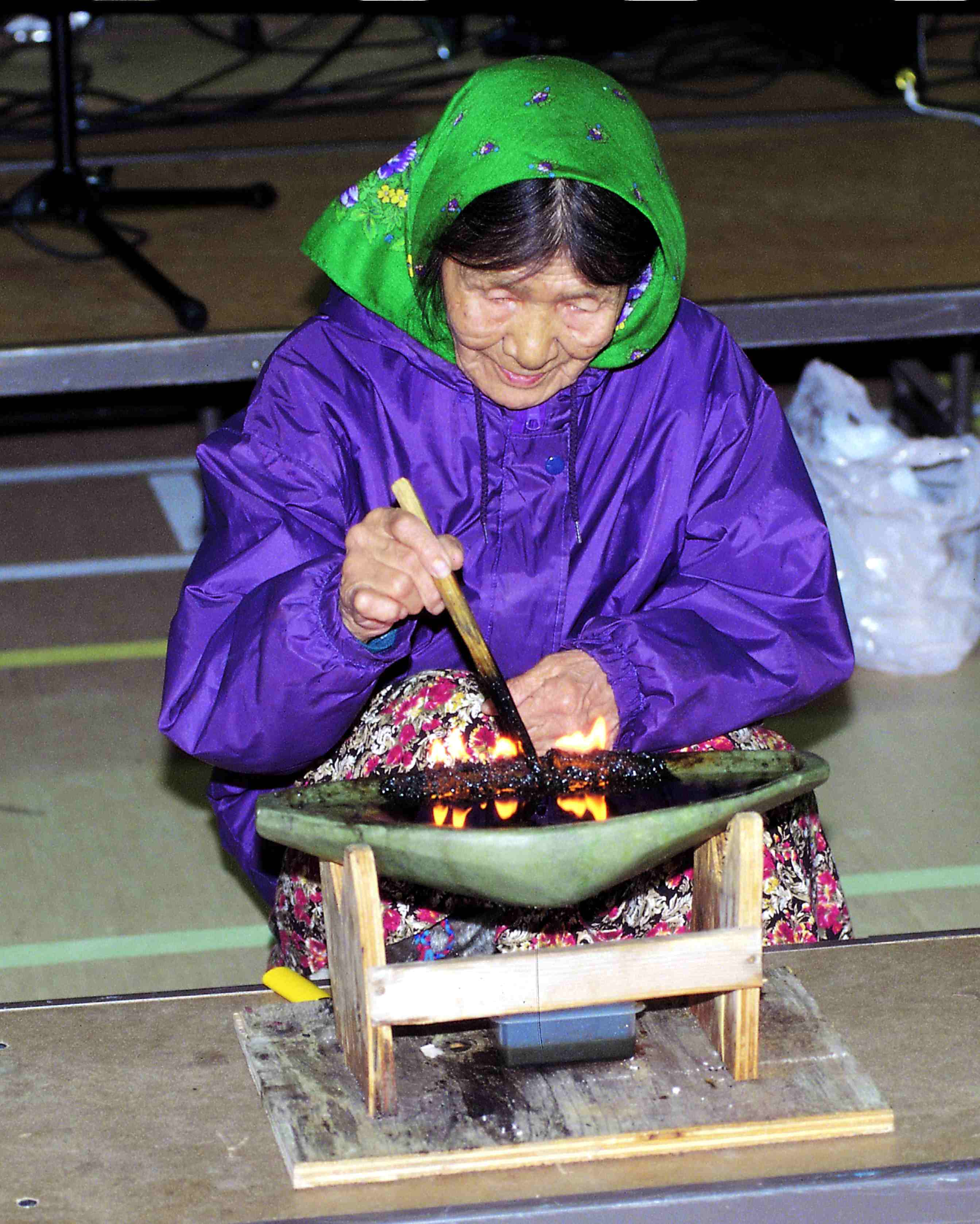
An Inuk woman tending a kudlik.

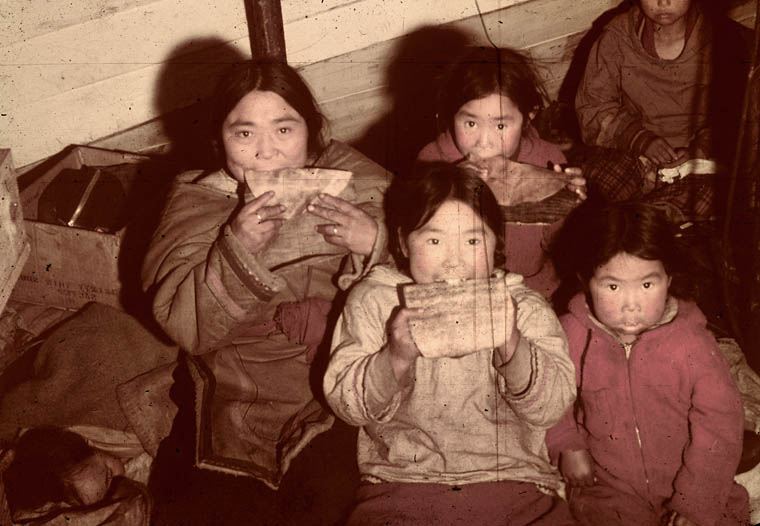
Inuit women and children soften sealskin by chewing it

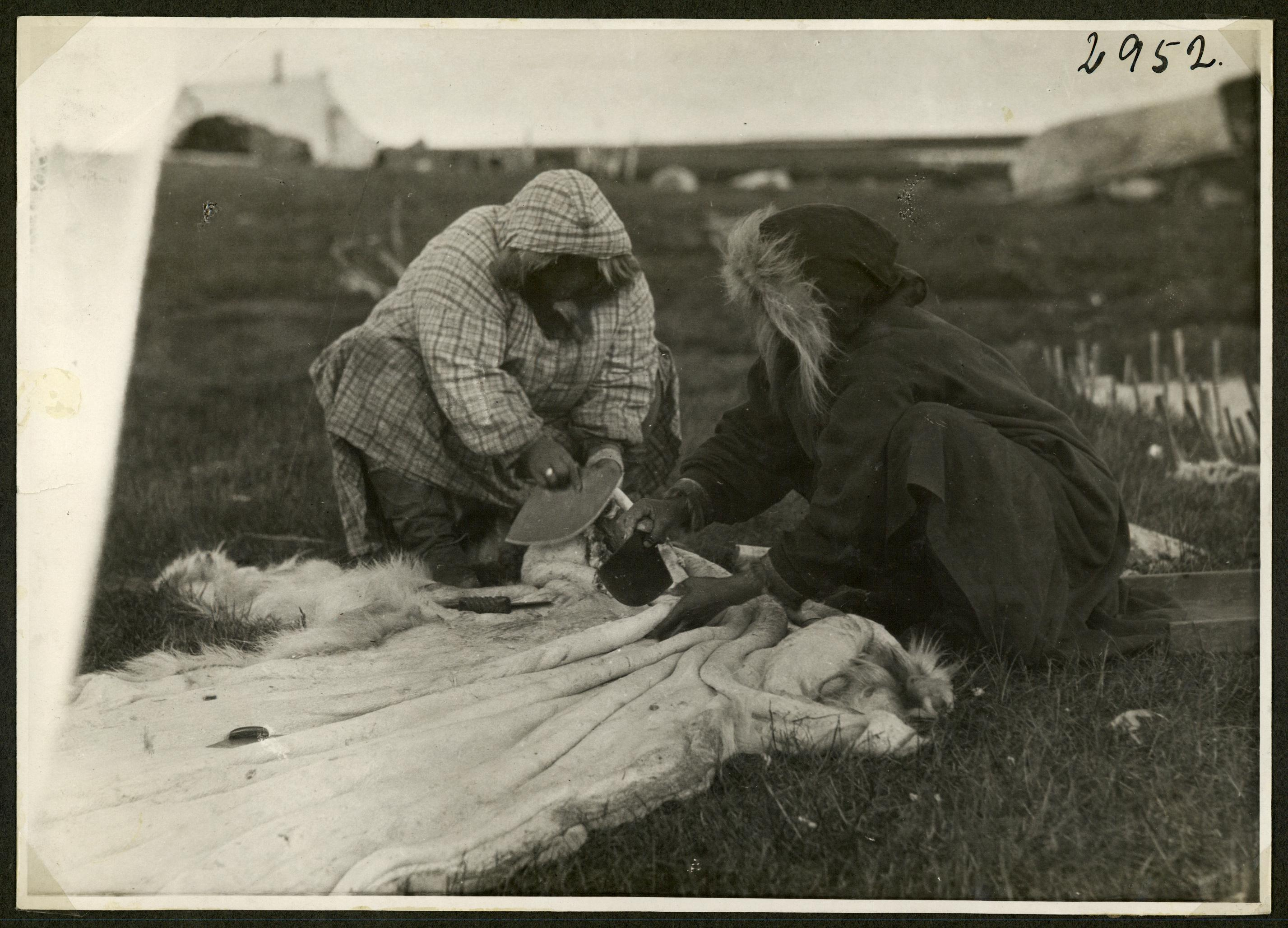
Inuit women scraping caribou skin

The Inuit are Indigenous people who live in the arctic and subarctic regions of the North American continent in areas of Alaska, Canada, and Greenland. Modern Inuit (descendents of Thule Inuit) are culturally related to Iñupiat (northern Alaska) and Yupik (Siberia and western Alaska), and the Aleut, who live in the Aleutian Islands of Siberia and Alaska. The term "Eskimo" is likely derived from the Algonquinian language and has historically been used to describe the Inuit, Yupik and other Indigenous Alaskan and Siberian peoples, but this appears to be in decline and is considered offensive. The role of Inuit women is crucial for the survival of communities through shared responsibilities with Inuit men. Recent modernization and urbanization have transformed traditional Inuit culture, thus influencing the role of women within the culture which includes both positive and negative impacts on the overall well-being of Inuit women.

== Family structure and marriage ==
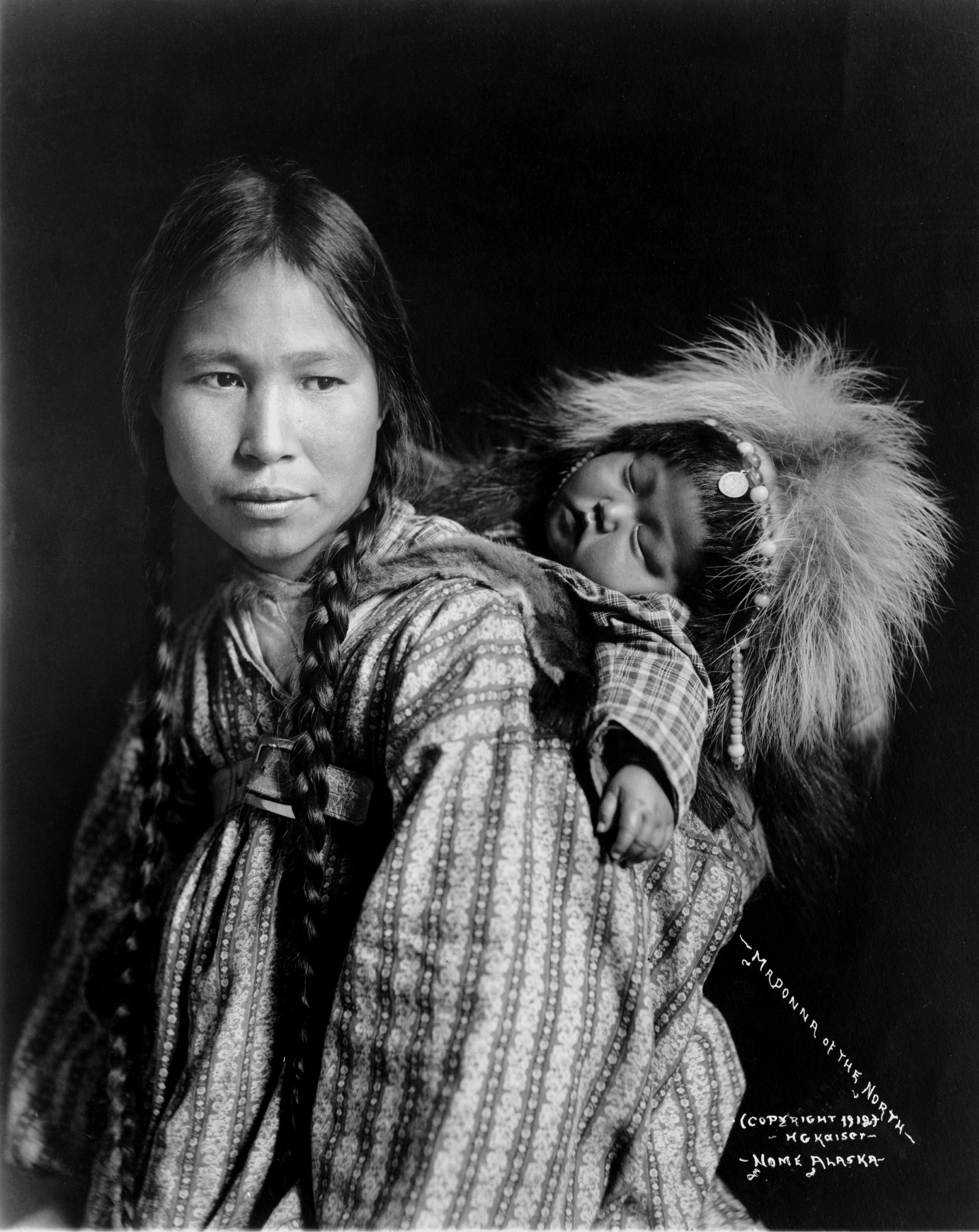
"Madonna of the North" (Inuk woman with child on back, c. 1912)

In Inuit culture, marriage wasn't usually a choice, instead, it was done out of necessity. Inuit men and women needed each other to survive. Married couples had to work together to overcome nearly impossible living conditions. Because each person had to rely on a partner to survive, marriages were often arranged at birth to ensure the family's survival. Love marriages, or choice marriages, existed, but these were all but arranged because there were usually few eligible partners. A young woman was eligible for marriage after puberty. Meanwhile, a man had to prove he was efficient enough in hunting to support a family before he could marry.

Inuit marriages rarely included large ceremonies; couples were often considered married after the birth of their first child. There were monogamous and polygamous marriages, but polygyny was rare because few men could afford to support multiple wives. Families exchanged gifts before marriages, but no official bride price or dowry was paid. Although men were considered the head of the family, both genders could demand a divorce. However, divorce was frowned upon because it was bad for the family and the community as a whole.

Spouses were sometimes traded or exchanged, and women had some say in this process. This was a common alternative to divorce because neither family would be without a component vital to its survival — a mother and a wife. In Inuit culture, the family was typically represented by a qullik (lamp) or a hearth, which was the property and responsibility of the wife. This lamp had significant symbolic meaning in the family, the community, and the culture.

=== Food production and preparation ===
Hunting and fishing were the primary sources of food for the Inuit, and men were traditionally responsible for these duties. Women's duties included gathering other sources of food, such as eggs and berries, and preparing the food the hunters brought back. Seals, walrus, whales and caribou were the most common targets of Inuit hunters. Animals killed by the hunters needed to be butchered and frozen quickly, before they went bad or froze before being butchered. Women were traditionally responsible for the butchering, skinning, and cooking of animals taken by the hunters.

In Inuit culture, it was believed that the women's respect for the animals killed during hunting trips, and subsequent care when butchering them, would ensure successful hunts. Food, as well as other resources, were often shared throughout the community as needed. Women were in charge of the distribution of food to families in the community.

The Inuit moved with the seasons to maximize their chances of a successful hunt; their entire families often moved with them. Because of this, tools and other items used by the Inuit for hunting and food preparation had to be light and easily transported. Among some Inuit groups, this led to the development of complex tools such as light and powerful metal harpoons and wood stoves, which were being used by the late 1800s.

== Children, reproduction, and motherhood ==
Childbirth and childcare were two of the most important responsibilities for an Inuk woman. Inuit parents showed a very high level of warmth and affection to their children. Inuit children usually began to contribute to the family and community by the age of 12 through activities like picking berries and hunting small game. During this period, they learned skills from their parents through close observation. Learning through observation was the chosen method because it was not practical for children to practice their skills by sewing valuable skins or accompanying men on important hunting trips.

Women raised boys and girls. Men taught boys certain skills, such as hunting, and women taught girls certain skills, such as sewing.

Kinship is an important factor to an Inuk child's cultural belonging. From birth, children are introduced to their duties and ties of kinship. One way Inuit achieve this is by the practice referred to as name-soul. After a member of the family has died, their name is used as the name for a child of the same family line. The name provides a child with a cultural tie, belonging within their community, and personal identity. In addition, name-soul allows for prior family members to carry on their legacy in their family lineage even after passing. The children are raised in a family-oriented environment, as their name serves as a reminder that the group comes first. There were no boy's and girl's names in Inuit culture, so it was common for a girl to have the name of her grandfather, for example.

Children were taught at a young age to listen to their parents and respect their elders, and were treated with more autonomy than non-Inuit children. Over disciplining a child was seen as counterproductive, so children were rarely punished for transgressions. Learning was regarded as a partnership between child and adult, with children being more guided through life than directly taught or lectured.

Adoption was very common in Inuit culture, and it was often very informal. Unwanted babies, or babies a family could not support, could be offered to another family. If the other family accepted, the adoption was complete.

Infanticide occurred when conditions were desperate and the group was threatened by starvation. A mother abandoned an infant in hopes that someone less desperate might find and adopt the child before the cold or animals killed it. The belief that the Inuit regularly resorted to infanticide may be due in part to studies done by Asen Balikci, Milton Freeman, and David Riches among the Netsilik, along with the trial of Kikkik.

=== Pregnancy behaviours and beliefs in Canada ===
==== Pregnancy ====
In regards to conception and pregnancy, young Inuit women were discouraged from engaging in sexual intercourse during puberty, ages 11 to 13 years, until they reached "prime maternity age", after marriage, about 15. Similar to menarche, many young Inuit women were unaware of the indications of their first pregnancy. Elders recount that young women often thought that they had been cured of their menses when they experienced amenorrhoea for the first time. It was not uncommon for the young woman to learn about her first pregnancy from her mother or grandmother when she began to show (or carry weight). According to elders, pregnancy was also determined by, "looking into the face" of the young woman and/or feeling her stomach for a fetus. Once aware, it was important that the woman immediately divulge her pregnancy status to her mother, husband, and close community, as the Inuit believed that her status demanded special considerations and/or treatment to ensure the health of the mother, baby, and camp.

To prevent miscarriage, the husband and camp were to assure that the woman did not become mentally stressed or exhausted during the pregnancy. This taboo extended to include not allowing the husband to get angry with his wife at any time during the pregnancy. If miscarriage did occur, the woman was expected to inform her mother and the camp right away. According to traditional Inuit beliefs, hiding such a secret would bring bad luck for the camp such as hunger, lack of food, or illness.

==== Taboos (pittailiniq) in pregnancy ====
In pregnancy, women's care was traditionally guided by the taboos, known as pittailiniq, from the elders in the community. These taboos, which were passed down through generations and varied somewhat across geographic regions or camps, informed the woman's behaviors and activities in order to prevent complications, promote a healthy birth, and ensure desired characteristics of the infant. For example, in regards to activity, the Inuit had many pittailiniq about maintaining physical activity throughout pregnancy and resisting idleness or laziness, which was believed to adversely affect labor and birth. The Inuit words sailliq and sailliqtuq, distinguished between the women who relaxed (sailliq) as appropriate, and those who relaxed too much, sailliqtuq. Another common pittailiniq instructed the woman to massage her stomach until she felt the fetus move so that the baby wouldn't "stick" to the uterus.

In interviews with Inuit elders, numerous pittailiniq about the woman's activity and behavior in pregnancy are discussed. Some of these are listed below.

==== Pittailiniq on activity in pregnancy ====
- In the morning when waking, go outside as fast as possible, to ensure a short labor and fast delivery
- Don't relax too much or the placenta might stick to the womb
- Don't lie around or take naps or the labor will be long
- When you stretch sealskin on a frame, don't wind the rope around your hands because this would cause the umbilical cord to be wrapped around the baby's neck.
- Don't put anything bowl-shaped on your head so the placenta won't get stuck on the baby's head.
- Don't walk backward or the baby will be breech
- Don't put your head or arm partway through a doorway or into a hole because during birth the baby will present and retreat back and forth, or the baby will come out arm first

==== Pittailiniq on behaviour in pregnancy ====
- When called outside or asked to perform a task, do so immediately to ensure a speedy delivery
- When beginning a project such as sewing, finish it or the labour will be longer
- Don't scratch the stomach so that stretch marks will be less noticeable
- Don't speak about or stare at other peoples' physical oddities such as a big nose, or the baby will have even more serious oddities
- Untie everything that is tied up so as to be more dilated when the baby is ready
- Don't wear tight pants while pregnant for an easier delivery
- Don't clean hands with an ulu or knife in order to prevent a dry, painful birth and risk of perineal tears
- Don't make bubbles with gum or blow up a balloon or the membranes might rupture
- Face the bed toward a doorway. If it is sideways toward the door the baby will be transverse
- Don't allow the legs to get cold during pregnancy, because this will cause hemorrhaging after birth

==== Diet in pregnancy ====
The Inuit also followed many taboos (pittailiniq) about diet and consumption in pregnancy. Consistently, elders report that pregnant women were to abstain from raw meat, eating only boiled or cooked meat, during pregnancy. Men were also expected to observe this rule, but only when in the presence of their wives. The preferential treatment of pregnant women also extended to food, and the best pieces of meat and food were always reserved for the pregnant woman.

The pittailiniq regarding the diet of pregnant women demonstrates the strong emphasis on maternal diet affecting infant beauty and/or appearance. Some of these pittailiniq are listed below.

==== Pittailiniq on diet in pregnancy ====
- When eating, be sure to finish the meal and lick the plate. This ensures that your baby will be beautiful.
- Eat caribou kidneys to ensure that you have beautiful babies
- When eating seal, swallow a seal cap to have a nice round baby
- Do not drink directly from a soup bowl or the baby will have dark skin
- Do not chew candle wax during pregnancy or the baby will be covered with a white coating at birth
- Eat seaweed if you want to have a boy

==== Preparation for birth ====
According to elders, the women were not taught how to prepare for birth. Women expected and trusted that they would receive instruction and advice from their midwife and other birth attendants (i.e. mother and/or mother-in-law) during the event. When labour and birth were perceived imminent, the woman and/or her attendants would set up a soft bed of caribou skins or heathers nearby. A thick layer of caribou fur on top of the heathers was desired in order to soak up the blood lost during birth.

==== Birth attendant(s) ====
According to elders, birth ideally occurred with both an assistant and midwife, but due to hunting-based economy/survival, many births occurred in transit or at a hunting camp. In these cases, the elders report that either the men would assist or the woman would endure birth alone. Due to the uncertainty of their location at the time of birth, the woman often did not know who her midwife would be until birth.

In the community, a midwife (Kisuliuq, Sanariak) or "maker" was a highly revered female member of the community, who had acquired experience and skills in birth by attending births with their mother, an elder, or another midwife of the community; often beginning at a young age. The responsibilities of the midwife varied somewhat by geographic region and camp, but often included, 1) comforting the woman, 2) knowing a woman's body, including 'what was inside', 3) instructing the woman during labour on what to expect, 4) repositioning the woman to promote quick deliveries, and 5) dealing with complications.

In most communities, the only man who became intentionally involved in birth was an angakkuq. In cases when the midwife or elder suspected a "spiritual or supernatural interference", the angakkuq would intervene to remove the spiritual interference of a spirit or another malicious angakkuq, to restore the spiritual balance and normal birth conditions.

==== Labour ====
Labour and birth were times of great celebration in the Inuit community. Traditionally, when a woman began having contractions, her midwife would gather other women of the community to help the labouring woman through the birthing process. Additional signs of labour noted by the Inuk midwife included a brown strip of discharge, broken water, stomachache, or the urge to pass a bowel movement. Although it was cause for great celebration, labour is traditionally a time of quiet and calm in the Inuit community, and the midwife would commonly whisper her counsel to the mother-to-be. If the woman had followed the traditions throughout her pregnancy, she could expect her labour to be quick and easy. Many of these also extended to the actions of the woman's midwife, who was also commanded to be swift in all aspects of her life so that her client would enjoy a quick delivery. Very often, women were expected to continue their daily chores up until the late stages of labour and endure labour pains without the aid of pain management.

The midwife's goals during labour typically included keeping the woman from becoming irritable or screaming, preventing her legs from opening, preventing her from peeing or having a bowel movement, and encouraging activity and position changes. The positions in which an Inuk woman laboured varied according to the midwife's preferences and her own comfort. These include lithotomy, side-lying, squatting, and standing positions have all been described in the literature. Often, a caribou pelt was placed under the woman and she was allowed to choose a bed or the floor. Some communities' midwives employed the use of equipment such as ropes to pull on or a box to lean over to help ease the pains of labour, but little evidence of either pharmacologic or medicinal herb pain relief is described. Traditionally, the woman was required to have her spine completely straight for the entirety of her labour and delivery. To facilitate this, the midwife would often place a wooden board behind the woman to keep her back aligned. Additionally, a rolled towel or block of wood was used to keep the woman's legs and feet apart during labour, which, in the midwives' view, helped to speed the labour along.

==== Birth ====
In traditional Inuit birth culture, the birth event was handled almost exclusively by the midwife. However, the woman played an active role in her own birth experience and was encouraged to follow her body's own physiologic cues regarding pushing and rest. When she was ready to push, the midwife would tell the woman to pull on her hair with both hands and bear down. While most Inuit women gave birth at home, in some Alaskan communities women gave birth in separate birthing huts (aanigutyak) built exclusively for this purpose. If this was not done, the place where the woman gave birth had to be abandoned.

Once the baby had crowned and was born, the midwife would cut the still-pulsating umbilical cord with a special knife and tie it with caribou sinew. The midwives knew that the sinew carried a much lower risk of infection than other materials available to them. The cord was cut with enough length to pull out the placenta by hand if necessary. After the child was born and the placenta was ready for delivery, many Inuit midwives would instruct the woman to get on all fours and push in this position. Midwives were also versed in providing fundal massage to reduce the risk of postpartum hemorrhage. Some Inuit communities wrapped the placenta in cloth and buried it among the rocks of the tundra.

==== Postpartum ====
Sources on traditional Inuit birth practices provide little reference to the postpartum period. One elder midwife in Nunavut described that after birth her mother-in-law very briefly cared for the house and chores until she felt better. She also described, however, that she was feeling better soon after birth and eagerly performing chores behind her mother-in-law's back.

In regards to physical care after birth, the information is also minimal. Women, who are able to breastfeed, do so immediately after birth, often continuing for two years or longer. Breastfeeding served as their only method of contraception and birth spacing. While breastfeeding, the elders describe the importance of keeping the breasts warm to prevent cracking and drinking broth for nutrition. If perineal tears have occurred during the delivery, they are left to heal on their own; the Inuit do not traditionally perform episiotomies or suture tears.

==== The newborn ====
The birth of a child in the camp was regarded as a significant event in the community, with members, including children, shaking hands upon the child's arrival. It was also believed that if the mother followed the 'pittailiniq' during pregnancy, the child would be healthy and lead a good life in the community.

Immediately after birth, the infant was assessed for breathing. If the infant was not breathing, then the midwife would hang the infant upside by his feet and slap his buttocks. The midwife also removed mucus from the infant's mouth, using either a wipe or her own mouth, to ensure that the baby was able to "fatten" in the coming days. The exposed cord stump was then covered with burnt arctic moss and the infant was placed in a rabbit fur or cloth pouch, sewn by the sinaji. The pouch served not only to keep the infant warm but also as a diaper and protection for the healing umbilical cord stump. It was believed that the cord stump should fall off on its own and not be looked for by the parents. If the mother found the cord stump, it indicated that the child would become hyperactive around age four. The infant was not routinely washed after birth.

Traditional Inuit midwives describe that the first stool (meconium) should be observed outside the womb, as it could cause clotting and complications if left in the mother. The treatment for which was to massage the woman's stomach, promoting blood flow. The midwives also expected the infant to urinate almost immediately after birth, indicating that there was no obstruction or genital abnormality. Infants, as well as the rabbit or cloth pouch, were always dried promptly after urinating or having a bowel movement. And by a year of age, elders claim that children were toilet trained.

Also occurring immediately after birth, a designated person, often the midwife, felt the infant's genitalia to determine its gender. This person then became the infant's sanaji (for an infant boy) or arnaliaq (for an infant girl) and assumed a lifelong role in the child's life. If the infant was a boy, he would later call this person his arnaquti and give her his first catch as a child. The sanaji was also responsible for cutting the umbilical cord, providing the infant's first clothes, naming the child (tuqurausiq), blessing the child (kipliituajuq) and conferring the desired characteristics onto the child. It was believed that the child's direction was shaped from the earliest days of life and consequently, these practices were held in high esteem as they determined the child's future.

In rare instances, the child might be considered sipiniq (Inuktitut: ᓯᐱᓂᖅ), meaning the infant is believed to have changed their physical sex from male to female at the moment of birth. This concept has primarily been historically attested in areas of the Canadian Arctic, such as Igloolik and Nunavik. Sipiniq children were regarded as socially male, and would be named after a male relative, perform a male's tasks, and would wear traditional Inuit clothing tailored for men's tasks. This generally lasted until puberty, but in some cases continued into adulthood and even after the sipiniq person married a man.

Once assessed by the midwife and/or sanaji, the infant was promptly given to the mother for initiation of breastfeeding. According to elders, the infant remained in nearly constant physical contact with her mother from the day of birth; sleeping on the family platform, riding in the amauti (baby carrier and parka worn by the mother), or nestled in her parka for feeding.

==== Naming the newborn ====
Performed by the sanaji or midwife, the tuqurausiq was the highly-valued naming practice that linked the child to a relative or deceased family friend. The Inuit believed that infants took on the soul or spirit of a recently deceased relative or community member at birth. Through the name, the child literally assumed the relationship of his/her namesake. For example, if a child were named for someone's mother, family members would then call that child "mother" and give the child the same respect given to that mother. The infant's name also represented an important factor in his/her behaviour. In particular, the Inuit believed that crying was an indication that the infant wanted to have a particular name. And that often once named, the infant would stop crying. In addition, as the infant or child is a representative of their namesake, they are considered to generally know what they want or need. For example, when they are hungry or tired. Given this belief, it was also considered inappropriate to tell an infant or child what to do, as it was similar to commanding an elder or another adult, which violated social rule in Inuit culture. When an infant or child exhibited the same behaviour as their namesake it was called atiqsuqtuq. Children in the 21st century are still named for other family members but the name may be an English one rather than a traditional Inuit name.

=== Other responsibilities ===
Along with childbirth and childcare, women were responsible for sewing skins to make clothes; preserving, processing, and cooking food (as mentioned above); caring for the sick and elderly; and helping to build and take care of the family's shelter. The production of warm, lightweight, and durable clothing was a critical technological development for the Inuit. Studies indicate that traditional Inuit gargments offer thermal protection against Arctic winters that competes effectively with modern synthetic apparel.

The clothing created by women was vital because life in Arctic conditions was not possible without extremely well-made clothing to protect from the bitter cold. The clothing was created by the careful sewing of animal skins and furs using ivory needles, which were highly valuable in Inuit society. The process of preparing skins to be sewn together for creating clothes was done by women and was an arduous task. Skins had to be scraped, stretched, and softened before they were ready to be sewn.

In addition to this, the households that Inuit women were expected to help construct and care for could range from igloos, to semi-subterranean sod houses, to tents in the summer months. This required an understanding of complex architectural concepts, as well as the principles of insulation. A good amount of strength was required to construct Inuit shelters. Because of this, Inuit women often worked together and enlisted the help of men to build their homes. For both practical and social purposes, these houses would be built close together or were made large enough for more than one family to live in.

== Status in Inuit culture ==
=== Sexual division of labour ===
Jobs in Inuit culture were not considered men's work or women's work, but the Inuit did believe in men's skills and women's skills. For example, hunting was generally done by men. Sewing clothes, cooking and preparing food, gathering food outside of hunting, and caring for the home were generally done by women. This does not mean that women never hunted, nor that men never helped with other jobs. This was just how the work was traditionally divided.

Women hunted and boated for enjoyment or when food was scarce and the community needed extra hunters. Men and women worked together to create a functioning culture. The men would not be able to go hunting without the warm clothes the women sewed for them, and the women would not have enough food without the meat the men brought back from their hunting trips.

Because of this, the work done by women received equal respect to the work done by men. While men and women generally did different work, one type of work was not considered better or more important than other types. It is easy to think that because men only had one job that they did less work. The truth is that hunting was extremely physically demanding and time-consuming, and often required traveling for days or weeks at a time. As a result, the sexual division of labour in Inuit culture was relatively equal in the amount of work done.

=== Power and influence ===
Women were respected for their unique skills, such as embroidery, hide tanning, and child-rearing. Decisions such as when to migrate and where to, were made by men. Inuit government was significantly different from the standardized Western idea of government, but some groups did have tribal or elder councils who made decisions for the community. Women had a relatively high social position and had significant control of their own home, as well as ceremonially important jobs such as lighting and tending to lamps and distributing food.

== Effects of modernization and change on Inuit women ==
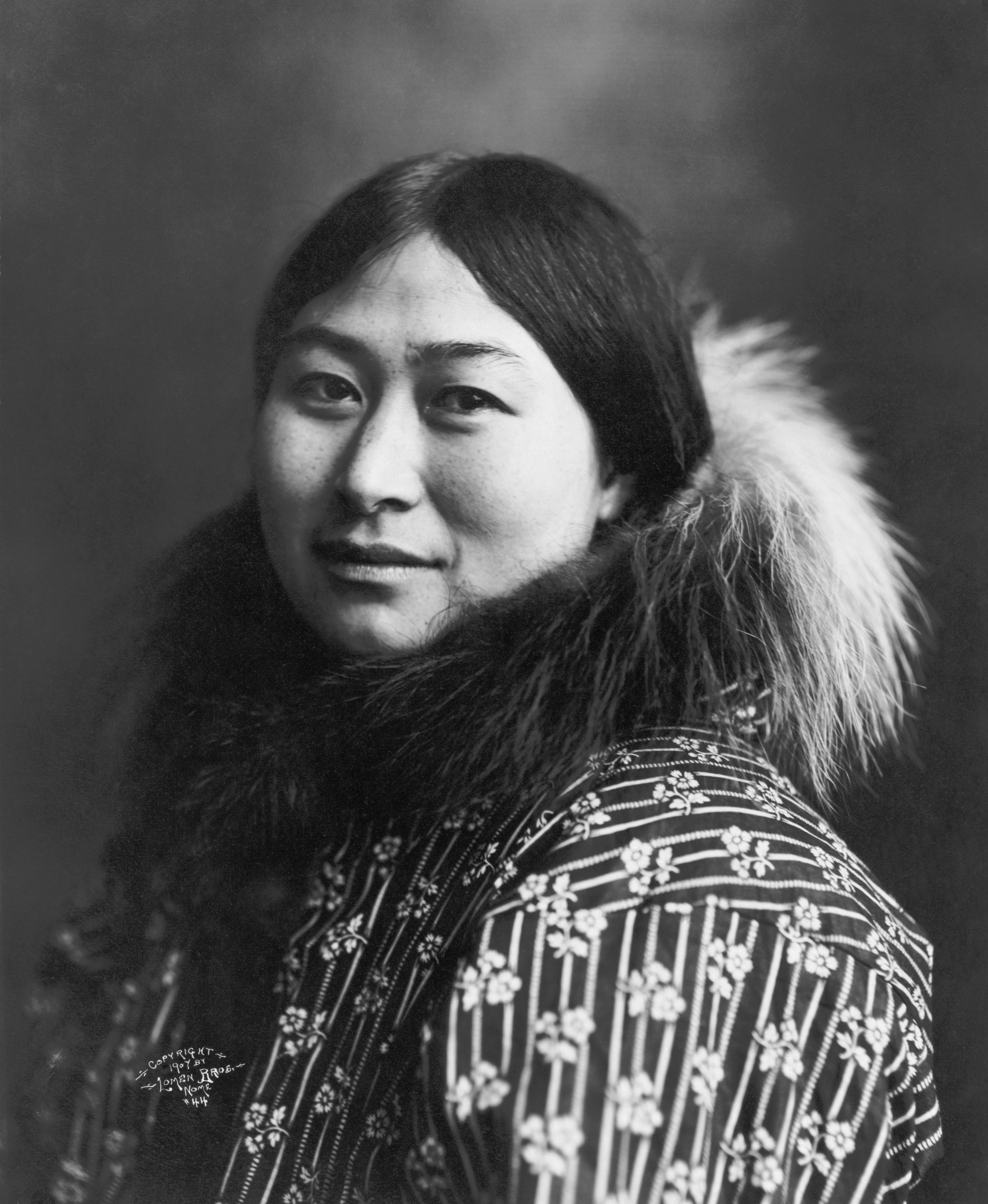
An Inuk (Iñupiaq) woman in traditional clothing, Nome, Alaska, 1907

New technology and ways of life were forced upon the Inuit by encroaching outside agencies such as the Canadian governmental body, which assumed control over Inuit people’s wellbeing and assimilation into the broadly-white Canadian citizenry for many years. The relationship between Inuit peoples and colonial settler forces remains inherently unequal, and the resulting impacts are felt heavily by Inuit women.

=== New role in the culture ===
After colonization, Inuit peoples were often relocated to Arctic towns and heavily discouraged from traditional cultural pursuits. Participation in wage labor, government employment, community councils, and the acquisition of Western clothing, housing, and vehicles became necessary for survival. Male Inuit initially faced more intense assimilation by learning the language of the colonizing culture and taking on modern, wage-earning jobs; however, a lack of education began to hinder the men's ability to find and keep jobs.

As a result of this, women began to be impacted more by cultural assimilation. Women started by finding work as domestic servants, store clerks, hospital aides, classroom assistants, interpreters, and in weaving and knitting shops. Inuit women tend to go to school more than Inuit men, and this is especially true of college. Some universities in regions where the Inuit are prominent, such as the Nunavut Arctic College, have programs designed specifically for the Inuit. Women, much more often than men, take advantage of these programs.

Because Inuit women seek more education and, subsequently, better jobs, they have increasingly taken on the role of primary wage earner for the family. This has caused men to assume responsibilities in the house that were traditionally done by the women, such as raising children and keeping the home in order.

=== Changes in status and power ===
Inuit women have increasingly started to run for political office. Inuit women traditionally served as mediators for the community, which is reflected in their modern involvement in the justice and governmental systems once forced upon them. Although the positions they seek are often at the community and local levels, this increase in activism reflects the confidence Inuit women have found in the modern world.

The second premier of Nunavut was a woman, Eva Aariak, who was one of two female MLAs in the Legislative Assembly of Nunavut at the time. Other women in elected positions include Elisapee Sheutiapik, also a MLA, and Madeleine Redfern, both mayors of Iqaluit. Four out of five members of parliament for the Nunavut electoral district have been women, Nancy Karetak-Lindell, Leona Aglukkaq, Mumilaaq Qaqqaq, and Lori Idlout.

=== Health issues ===
Scientists have found that the Inuit seem to experience more illness and health issues than other groups, especially the women and children, and especially in the post-modernization period. A possible explanation is that the Inuit diet was traditionally high in fat and protein and low in fruits and vegetables.

More likely explanations include a change in diet after modernization, a decrease in physical activity as traditional jobs such as hunting and constructing homes are practised less, or exposure to alcohol, tobacco, and other drugs. Whatever the cause, diabetes, heart disease, and high cholesterol are known recurring health problems for the Inuit. Studies have shown that these issues are worse for women than other groups. Food insecurity within the household remains an issue; a family with no male hunters often struggles to feed itself. The decline in interest in traditional hunting among Inuit youth, which has been encouraged by outside forces such as the Canadian government, leads to a lack of fresh food. Women with no hunters in the family describe this as an obstacle to food security, as store-bought food grows increasingly expensive and does not always meet nutritional needs.

Another major issue facing the Inuit is that, after modernization, suicide among Canadian and Greenlandic Inuit, violence, depression, and substance abuse have become increasingly prevalent.

The pressure for Inuit women to conform to the dress and behavior of modern Western culture is immense; however, many aspects of modern culture are foreign to the Inuit women and are at odds with the traditional practices of their culture.

== See also ==
- Inuit art
- Inuit languages
- Inuit religion
- Lists of Inuit
