= Mumilaaq Qaqqaq =

Canadian politician (born 1993)

- ᒧᒥᓛᖅ ᖃᖅᑲᖅ

Member of Parliament for Nunavut
- In office 21 October 2019 – 20 September 2021
- Preceded by: Hunter Tootoo
- Succeeded by: Lori Idlout

Personal details
- Born: Trina Qaqqaq; 4 November 1993 (age 32) Baker Lake, Northwest Territories, Canada
- Party: New Democratic

Mumilaaq Qaqqaq (Inuktitut: ᒧᒥᓛᖅ ᖃᖅᑲᖅ; born 4 November 1993; formerly known as Trina Qaqqaq) is a Canadian activist and former politician who served as the member of Parliament (MP) for Nunavut in the House of Commons from 2019 to 2021.

Elected in the 2019 Canadian federal election, Qaqqaq was the first member of the New Democratic Party (NDP) to represent Nunavut since the creation of the territory in 1999; Peter Ittinuar (MP for Nunatsiaq) had previously represented what is now Nunavut as an NDP member until switching affiliation to the Liberal Party in 1982. During her tenure, she was the only non-Liberal MP from Northern Canada.

== Early life and personal life ==
Qaqqaq was born in Baker Lake, Northwest Territories, and later moved to Iqaluit. She was formerly known as Trina Qaqqaq, but later on adopted Mumilaaq, a moniker given by her father. Mumilaaq means "dancing little one" in Inuktitut; Qaqqaq stated she adopted the name to reclaim her culture.

Qaqqaq moved to Ottawa in 2011 to study for business administration at Algonquin College. She played ice hockey and competed in 2012 Arctic Winter Games. Later, in 2016, she obtained her diploma in business administration program from Sir Sandford Fleming College in Peterborough, Ontario.

Before her election to Parliament, she was a facilitator, public speaker, and volunteer, best known for a speech she made in the House of Commons on International Women's Day in 2017. Qaqqaq's speech was a part of Daughters of the Vote, a program that brings young women to the House of Commons to speak about their visions for their country and home community. Qaqqaq's speech, in which she spoke about the high rates of Inuit suicide, drew two standing ovations. She worked as an employment officer with Nunavut Tunngavik Incorporated, and as a wellness program specialist with the health department of the Government of Nunavut. She has held positions with Inuit Tapiriit Kanatami, working with Susan Aglukark in the Arctic Rose Foundation, and with Northern Youth Abroad.

On 23 October 2020, Qaqqaq announced she would be stepping aside for at least eight weeks for what she described as "personal health problems" based on advice from her doctor. Qaqqaq returned on 5 January 2021 citing "extreme burnout, depression, and anxiety" as the reason for her leave. Before her leave, she went on a three-week tour of the territory in a review of the housing situation Nunavummiut faced.

== Political career ==
Qaqqaq was approached by the NDP to contest the 2019 Canadian federal election in Nunavut, and accepted their nomination in September 2019. Qaqqaq's Conservative opponent in this race, Leona Aglukkaq, was the MP for Nunavut from 2008 to 2015, winning the seat in both the 2008 and the 2011 federal elections. Aglukkaq had held four ministerial portfolios under Stephen Harper, including Minister of Health and Minister of the Environment. The Liberal incumbent, Hunter Tootoo, had been Minister of Fisheries, Oceans and the Canadian Coast Guard from 2015 to 2016. Tootoo announced in July 2019 that he would not seek re-election, after resigning from the Liberal Party caucus and the cabinet in 2016. Instead, the Liberal Party nominated Megan Pizzo Lyall, producing a noteworthy race in which the three major party nominees were all Inuit women.

Qaqqaq's age at the time of her election, 25, was almost identical to the average age in Nunavut of 24.7. This was viewed as an asset in her election, and Qaqqaq emphasized the contrast between her recent entrance into federal politics and the Liberal and Conservative parties' histories of representing Nunavut. During the campaign Qaqqaq's stated priorities were to reduce Nunavut's suicide rate, increase access to housing, and ensure food security in Nunavut.

Qaqqaq's most recent initiative has been her emphasis on the effects of climate change, including mentioning unpredictable temperatures that cause strain on animal populations and create hazardous conditions for hunters. Qaqqaq was also named critic for Northern affairs and the Canadian Northern Economic Development Agency, also known as CanNor. The agency oversees the development of businesses, skills, and community infrastructure, and has a hand in resource development in the North.

On 19 April 2021, Qaqqaq claimed that Labrador MP Yvonne Jones was "not an Inuk," and southern Labrador is "not an Inuit region". Jones dismissed Qaqqaq's comments as "immature and naïve". Qaqqaq later issued an email statement apologizing "for how I handled the situation".

On 20 May, Qaqqaq announced that she would not seek re-election at the 2021 Canadian federal election. On 15 June, she gave a farewell speech explaining her actions such as her anger at her racist mistreatment by Parliament security and more importantly her frustrations about she felt she was accomplishing little against what she considered racist indifference to the serious social problems her constituents were enduring by the government who was performing the bare minimum in response and expecting praise for that.

At a press conference on 8 July, Qaqqaq and fellow NDP MP Charlie Angus called on Justice Minister David Lametti to investigate "crimes against humanity," referring to the sexual and physical abuse of Indigenous children under the residential and day school system. They called on Lametti to appoint a special prosecutor specializing in cases of child abuse. They held portraits of two clerics involved in multiple cases of crimes against children, including that of Johannes Rivoire, whom France was refusing to extradite to face charges in Canada.

Qaqqaq was succeeded by Lori Idlout in the 2021 election.

== Electoral results ==
2019 Canadian federal election: Nunavut
| Party | Candidate | Votes | % | ±% | Expenditures |
|---|---|---|---|---|---|
| New Democratic | Mumilaaq Qaqqaq | 3,861 | 40.84 | +14.26 | $5,331.45 |
| Liberal | Megan Pizzo Lyall | 2,918 | 30.87 | –16.24 | $29,996.72 |
| Conservative | Leona Aglukkaq | 2,469 | 26.12 | +1.34 | $16,176.33 |
| Green | Douglas Roy | 206 | 2.18 | +0.65 | none listed |
| Total valid votes/expense limit | | 9,454 | 99.08 | – | $103,762.32 |
| Total rejected ballots | | 88 | 0.92 | +0.13 | |
| Turnout | | 9,542 | 47.65 | –11.72 | |
| Eligible voters | | 20,025 | | | |
| New Democratic gain from Liberal | | Swing | | +15.25 | |
Source: Elections Canada
