= Iqaluit City Council =

Governing body of Iqaluit, Nunavut, Canada

All Independent

Iqaluit City Council (Inuktitut: ᐃᖃᓗᐃᑦ ᓄᓇᓕᐸᐅᔭᐃᑦ ᑲᑎᒪᔨᖏᑦ, romanized: Iqaluit Nunalipaujait Katimajingit) is the governing body of the city of Iqaluit, Nunavut, Canada. As of 2022, the council consists of mayor Solomon Awa, deputy mayor Kyle Sheppard, and councillors Romeyn Stevenson (alternate deputy mayor), Simon Nattaq, Ookalik Curley, Paul Quassa, Kimberly Smith, Samuel Tilley, and Swany Amarapala.

From 1964 to 1979, Frobisher Bay was led by community council and chair. After 1979–1980, Frobisher Bay had a town council and mayor and since 2001 a city council and a mayor.

The council is elected fully at-large, with the mayor and all eight councillors elected citywide.

== 2006–2009 ==
- Mayor: Elisapee Sheutiapik (acclaimed)
- Glenn Williams
- Jimmy Kilabuk
- Marc Boudreau
- Jim Little
- David Alexander
- Simon Nattaq
- Claude Martel
- Al Hayward

On 10 September 2008, CBC North reported that Sheutiapik would be taking a leave of absence to run in the upcoming Nunavut election. She ran in Iqaluit West, which had the highest voter turnout at 90.2% but was defeated by incumbent MLA Paul Okalik by 44 votes. She subsequently returned to the mayor's chair.

== 2009–2012 ==
The 2009 municipal election was held on 19 October. Elisapee Sheutiapik and former councillor, Jim Little, were both running for mayor. Sheutiapik won with 57.7% of the vote to Little's 42.3%.

For council, a total of 21 people ran for the eight seats. These included incumbents Glenn Williams, Jimmy Kilabuk, David Alexander, Simon Nattaq and Claude Martel. On the day of the election Alexander was shown with 597 votes, one more than Romeyn Stevenson. However a recount was held and Stevenson gained five more votes for a total of 601.

Results
Name	Total votes	%	Elected
Mary Ekho Wilman	1,002	9.7%	Elected
David Ell	736	4.2%	Elected
Jimmy Kilabuk	709	6.8%	Elected
Simon Nattaq	709	6.8%	Elected
Mary Akpalialuk	654	6.3%	Elected
Mat Knicklebein	651	6.3%	Elected
Natsiq Alainga-Kango	637	5.8%	Elected
Romeyn Stevenson	601	5.8%	Elected
David Alexander	597	4.2%	
Glenn A. Williams	576	5.6%	
Anthony (Tony) Rose	561	5.4%	
Betty Brewster	526	2.7%	
Nancy Gillis	436	6.2%	
Caroline Anawak	432	5.1%	
Eddie Rideout	318	3.1%	
Brad Chambers	284	2.7%	
David Eddie Devries	279	7.1%	
Claude Martel	263	2.5%	
Brian Willoughby	153	1.5%	
Kathleen E. Marko	120	1.2%	
Boazie Ootoova	107	1.0%	

=== 2010 by-elections ===
Incumbent mayor Elisapee Sheutiapik and councillor Natsiq Alainga-Kango both resigned in 2010, Sheutiapik for personal reasons and Alainga-Kango to run for the presidency of Nunavut Tunngavik. A by-election on December 13, 2010, chose Madeleine Redfern to succeed Sheutiapik as mayor and Joanasie Akumalik to succeed Alainga-Kango on council.

Iqaluit municipal by-elections, 2010
Mayor
Name	Vote	%
Madeleine Redfern	377	30.26
Allen Hayward	314	25.20
Paul Kaludjak	314	25.20
Jim Little	241	19.34
Total Valid Ballots	1246	100%
Rejected ballots	16	
Councillor
Name	Vote	%
Joanasie Akumalik	758	60.54
Stephen Mansell	335	26.76
Ed Devries	159	12.70
Total Valid Ballots	1252	100%

== 2012 election ==
Iqaluit municipal election, 2012
Mayor
Name	Total votes	%	Elected
John Graham	953	71%	Elected
Allen Hayward	204	15%	Not Elected
Noah Ooloonie Papatsie	184	14%	Not Elected
Total Valid Ballots	1,341	100%	
Rejected ballots	1		
Councillor
Name	Total votes	%	Elected
Mary Ekho Wilman	1,070	12.9%	Elected
Romeyn Stevenson	1,000	12.1%	Elected
Joanasie Akumalik	924	11.2%	Elected
Kenny Bell	921	11.1%	Elected
Jimmy Kilabuk	918	11.1%	Elected
Simon Nattaq	880	10.6%	Elected
Terry Dobbin	808	9.8%	Elected
Mark Morrissey	669	8.1%	Elected
Lewis Falkiner MacKay	595	7.2%	Not Elected
Ranbir S. Hundal	491	5.9%	Not Elected
Total Valid Ballots	8,276	100%	
Rejected ballots	42		

== 2015 election ==
Mayoral Candidate	Vote	%
Madeleine Redfern	1,005	59.40
Mary Wilman	527	31.15
Noah Paptsie	160	9.46

Elected to council

- Gideonie Joamie
- Joanasie Akumalik
- Simon Nattaq
- Megan Pizzo Lyall
- Jason Rochon
- Romeyn Stevenson
- Kuthula Matshazi
- Terry Dobbin

== 2019 election ==
Mayoral Candidate	Vote	%
Kenny Bell	1,049	60.39
Noah Uluuni Paptsie	688	39.61

Elected to council

- Janet Pitsiulaaq Brewster
- Joanasie Akumalik
- Solomon Awa
- Romeyn Stevenson
- Kyle Sheppard
- Sheila Flaherty
- Simon Nattaq
- Malaiya Lucassie

== 2023 election ==
Mayoral Candidate	Vote	%
Solomon Awa	1,007	79.42
Vincent Yvon	171	13.49
Lili Weemen	90	7.10

Elected to council

- Kim Smith
- Romeyn Stevenson
- Kyle Sheppard
- Samuel Tilley
- Harry Flaherty
- Simon Nattaq
- Methusalah Kunuk
- Jack Anawak

== Mayors and Council Chairs ==
From 1964 to 1979 the settlement was headed by a chair.

Village of Frobisher Bay 1964–1980

- Gordon Rennie 1964–1969
- Bryan Pearson 1969–1979

The Chair was renamed as mayor in 1979 and Frobisher Bay became a town in 1980.

Town of Frobisher Bay 1980–1987

- Bryan Pearson 1979–1985

Town of Iqaluit 1987–2001

- Joe Kunuk 1994–1997
- Jimmy Kilabuk 1997–2000
- John Matthews 2000

City status was granted in 2001.

City of Iqaluit

- John Matthews 2001–2003
- Elisapee Sheutiapik 2003–2010
- Madeleine Redfern 2010–2012
- John Graham 2012–2014 (Stepped down in June 2014)
- Mary Wilman 2014–2015 (Interim mayor)
- Madeleine Redfern 2015–2019
- Kenny Bell (2019–2022)
- Solomon Awa (2022–present)
