= Jack Anawak =

Canadian politician (born 1950)

Jack Iyerak Anawak
- ᔭᒃ ᐃᐊᕋᒃ ᐊᓇᕙᒃ

Canadian Ambassador for Circumpolar Affairs
- In office January 19, 2004 – October 3, 2006
- Prime Minister: Jean Chrétien
- Preceded by: Mary Simon
- Succeeded by: Position abolished
Parliamentary constituencies
Member of the Legislative Assembly of Nunavut for Rankin Inlet North
In office February 15, 1999 – February 16, 2004
Preceded by	Riding established
Succeeded by	Tagak Curley
Member of Parliament for Nunatsiaq
In office November 21, 1988 – June 2, 1997
Preceded by	Thomas Suluk
Succeeded by	Nancy Karetak-Lindell

Personal details
- Born: September 26, 1950 (age 76) Repulse Bay, Northwest Territories
- Party: Liberal (1988–1997); Independent (1999–2004); New Democratic (2015)

Jack Iyerak Anawak (born September 26, 1950) is a Canadian politician. He represented the electoral district of Nunatsiaq in the House of Commons of Canada from 1988 to 1997. He sat in the house as a member of the Liberal Party of Canada. Following his retirement from federal politics, he also served a term in the Legislative Assembly of Nunavut after that territory was created in 1999. He ran as the New Democratic Party's candidate for his old riding, now renamed Nunavut, in the 2015 election, but was defeated by Liberal candidate Hunter Tootoo.

== Political career ==
=== Federal politics ===
Anawak was first elected in the 1988 election, and served as the Liberal Party's opposition critic for Northern Affairs in the 34th Canadian Parliament. Re-elected in the 1993 election, which was won by the Liberals, he was named parliamentary secretary to the Minister of Indian Affairs and Northern Development in the government of Jean Chrétien.

=== Territorial politics ===
In 1999, he was elected as a member of the Legislative Assembly of Nunavut for the seat of Rankin Inlet North. He was widely favoured to be the new territory's first Premier. However, he was perceived as the choice of the Chrétien government. The Assembly, which operates on a nonpartisan consensus model, selected Paul Okalik instead.

Anawak did not run for re-election in 2004. He tried to return to the Assembly in the 2008 Nunavut general election, filing nomination papers to run in the electoral district of Akulliq. Elections Nunavut Chief Electoral Officer Sandy Kusugak rejected his candidacy, as he was not a full-time resident of Nunavut at the time his nomination papers were filed. Anawak took Elections Nunavut to court and managed to halt the election in that district pending his appeal, but on November 6, the Nunavut Court of Justice threw out the election challenge.

Anawak ran again in the 2013 territorial election, but finished fourth in the Iqaluit-Niaqunnguu riding.

=== Return to federal politics ===
In 2015, Anawak announced his intent to take back his old riding, now renamed Nunavut, in the 2015 election. This time, he ran as the candidate of the New Democratic Party. He came second in the race.

=== Popular culture ===
When the Canadian two-dollar coin was introduced, a number of nicknames were suggested. Jack Anawak proposed the name "Nanuq" [nanook, polar bear] in honour of Canadian Inuit and their northern culture; however, this culturally meaningful proposal went largely unnoticed beside the simple, mass-appeal "Twonie/Toonie".

=== Municipal politics ===
Anawak was elected to Iqaluit City Council in the 2023 municipal election.

== Canadian Ambassador for Circumpolar Affairs ==
Anawak served as Canadian Ambassador for Circumpolar Affairs from January 2004 until 2006 when the position was discontinued by the Harper government. Its functions were transferred to the bureaucratic level.

== Electoral history ==
2015 Canadian federal election: Nunavut
Party	Candidate	Votes	%	±%	Expenditures
Liberal	Hunter Tootoo	5,619	47.11	+18.41	$31,498.80
New Democratic	Jack Anawak	3,171	26.58	+7.21	$10,713.72
Conservative	Leona Aglukkaq	2,956	24.78	–25.12	$36,393.17
Green	Spencer Rocchi	182	1.53	–0.50	none listed
Total valid votes/expense limit		11,928	99.21	–	$203,887.65
Total rejected ballots		95	0.79	+0.08	
Turnout		12,023	59.37	+13.66	
Eligible voters		20,252			
Liberal gain from Conservative		Swing		+21.77	
Source: Elections Canada

1993 Canadian federal election: Nunatsiaq
Party	Candidate	Votes	%	±%
Liberal	Jack Anawak	6,685	69.79	+29.85
Progressive Conservative	Leena Evic-Twerdin	1,970	20.57	–2.38
New Democratic	Mike Illnik	924	9.65	–23.51
Total valid votes		9,579	98.78	
Total rejected ballots		118	1.22	+0.44
Turnout		9,697	67.49	–6.85
Eligible voters		14,368		
Liberal hold		Swing		+16.11
Source: Elections Canada

1988 Canadian federal election: Nunatsiaq
Party	Candidate	Votes	%	±%
Liberal	Jack Anawak	3,356	39.94	+11.04
New Democratic	Peter Kusugak	2,786	33.15	+4.50
Progressive Conservative	Bryan Pearson	1,928	22.94	–9.55
Independent	Richard Inukpak Lee	333	3.96	–
Total valid votes		8,403	99.22	
Total rejected ballots		66	0.78	+0.07
Turnout		8,469	74.34	+5.30
Eligible voters		11,392		
Liberal gain from Progressive Conservative		Swing		+3.27
Source: Elections Canada
