= Thomas Suluk =

Canadian politician

Member of Parliament for Nunatsiaq
- In office 1984–1988
- Preceded by: Peter Ittinuar
- Succeeded by: Jack Anawak

Personal details
- Born: March 14, 1950 Arviat, Northwest Territories, Canada
- Died: October 13, 2018 (aged 68)
- Party: Progressive Conservative

Thomas Suluk (Inuktitut: ᑖᒪᔅ ᓱᓗᒃ; March 14, 1950 – October 13, 2018) was a Canadian politician. He represented the electoral district of Nunatsiaq in the House of Commons of Canada from 1984 to 1988 as a member of the Progressive Conservatives.

== Biography ==
Thomas Suluk was born on March 14, 1950, in Arviat, then part of the Northwest Territories. After graduating from Arthur Turner Anglican Theological School in Pangnirtung, on Baffin Island, Suluk was posted to Apex, Iqaluit. However, at age 22, he was one year too young to go through the process of ordination. Instead of waiting, Suluk chose to enter politics, during a time when Inuit were beginning to learn of land claims and their civil rights. He began in his local council office, but moved on to working for Inuit Tapiriit Kanatami, as he had an interest in broader community issues.

After working as a Canadian Broadcasting Corporation radio announcer for a short period, Suluk won an election to the House of Commons of Canada at the 1984 federal election, representing the electoral district of Nunatsiaq (now Nunavut). His election was close - his Progressive Conservative candidacy narrowly defeated the Liberal candidate, Robert Kuptana, by just 247 votes. During his time in Parliament, Suluk focused on land claims issues in Nunavut, and was also involved with the Tungavik Federation of Nunavut (now Nunavut Tunngavik Incorporated), which was at the time the peak organisation tasked with negotiating land claims and treaties for Inuit. Suluk did not contest the seat at the following election.

After his brief role in politics, Suluk opened a coffeeshop in Arviat, and as of 2008 was working on the 2007/8 Inuit Health Survey.

== Electoral record ==
1984 Canadian federal election: Nunatsiaq
Party	Candidate	Votes	%	±%
Progressive Conservative	Thomas Suluk	2,237	32.49	+24.72
Liberal	Robert Kuptana	1,990	28.90	–12.90
New Democratic	Rhoda Innuksuk	1,973	28.65	–18.62
Independent	Peter Ittinuar	686	9.96	–
Total valid votes		6,886	99.29	
Total rejected ballots		49	0.71	+0.25
Turnout		6,935	69.04	+2.28
Eligible voters		10,045		
Progressive Conservative gain from New Democratic		Swing		+18.81
Independent candidate Peter Ittinuar lost 37.31 percentage points from the 1980 election, when he ran as a New Democrat.
Source: Elections Canada
