= Tagak Curley =

Canadian politician

MLA for Keewatin South, NT
- In office 1979–1983
- Preceded by: new district
- Succeeded by: riding dissolved

MLA for Aivilik, NT
- In office 1983–1987
- Preceded by: first member
- Succeeded by: Peter Irniq

MLA for Rankin Inlet North, NU
- In office 2004–2013
- Preceded by: Jack Anawak
- Succeeded by: riding dissolved

Personal details
- Born: 1944 (age 81–82) Coral Harbour, Northwest Territories (now Coral Harbour, Nunavut)
- Party: non-partisan consensus government

Tagak Curley CM ONu (born 1944) is an Inuk leader, politician and businessman from Nunavut. As a prominent figure in the negotiations that led to the creation of Nunavut, Tagak is considered a living Father of Confederation in Canada. He was born in a hunting camp at Coral Harbour, Northwest Territories (now Nunavut).

== Career ==
From 1966 to 1970, Curley worked as a development officer with the federal Department of Indian Affairs and Northern Development. Based on his experiences, Curley became politically active and took on leadership roles at the local level to promote better living conditions for Inuit in local communities across Nunavut. From 1970 to 1971, Curley served as the Repulse Bay settlement manager. He also acted as editor of the Keewatin Echo, the first English-Inuktitut newspaper in Canada. He was a founding member and the first president of the Inuit Tapiriit Kanatami (Inuit Tapirisat of Canada) in 1971. ITK was formed to represent Nunavut Inuit by their own organization. While president of Inuit Tapirisat of Canada, Curley sat on the steering committee for the Inuit Land Use and Occupancy Project, which provided a basis for the Nunavut land claim.

Curley held leadership positions with the Inuit Cultural Institute, as well as the Inuit Development Corporation (an Inuit economic development organization now known as Nunasi Corporation), and the Nunavut Construction Corporation.

At the territorial level, Curley served as a member of the Legislative Assembly of the Northwest Territories from 1979 to 1987; at the time, Nunavut was under the Northwest Territories. While in government, he held several cabinet posts, including the minister of economic development, minister of Mines and Resources Secretariat, and minister of public utilities from 1984 to 1987, and minister of government services in 1986–87.

He ran as a federal Liberal candidate in the 1979 election for the Nunatsiaq (now Nunavut) riding, coming in second to Peter Ittinuar.

In the years following the passage of the Nunavut Act, Curley acted as business manager for Nunavut Tunngavik Incorporated (NTI), the organization responsible for representing the Nunavut Inuit under the Nunavut land claim agreement. In 1998, Curley was awarded the Aboriginal Lifetime Achievement award for his contribution and leadership in business. In October 2003, Curley received the Order of Canada.

In the 2004 Nunavut general election, Curley was acclaimed for the Nunavut riding of Rankin Inlet North. He re-entered politics because he was angered that the territory's 2003 Human Rights Act prohibits discrimination against homosexuals.

After the election, Curley challenged Paul Okalik for premiership of Nunavut, but was not elected by the Legislative Assembly. He later called for Okalik to resign as premier after Okalik made derogatory remarks about a senior municipal government official from Iqaluit to that city's mayor, Elisapee Sheutiapik.

In 2008, he appeared in the documentary Passage, challenging 19th century claims by Lady Franklin, widely believed at the time, that the Inuit were responsible for signs of cannibalism among her husband's doomed expedition through the Northwest Passage. In 2015, Curley received the Order of Nunavut.

== Electoral record ==
1979 Canadian federal election: Nunatsiaq
Party	Candidate	Votes	%	±%
New Democratic	Peter Ittinuar	1,963	37.74	–
Liberal	Tagak Curley	1,887	36.27	–
Progressive Conservative	Abe Okpik	1,352	25.99	–
Total valid votes		5,202	99.37	
Total rejected ballots		33	0.63	–
Turnout		5,235	64.95	–
Eligible voters		8,060		
New Democratic notional hold		Swing		N/A
This riding was created from part of Northwest Territories, where New Democrat Wally Firth was the incumbent.
Source: Elections Canada
