= John Graham (Nunavut politician) =

Canadian politician

Mayor of Iqaluit, Nunavut
- In office 2012 – June 24, 2014
- Preceded by: Madeleine Redfern
- Succeeded by: Mary Wilman

John Graham is a Canadian politician, who was elected mayor of Iqaluit, Nunavut in the 2012 municipal election.

Prior to being elected mayor, Graham worked as manager of the Iqaluit Airport.

In June 2014, Graham stepped down from the mayor's position. Deputy mayor Mary Wilman served as acting mayor after his resignation, until being selected as mayor in a council vote on November 25.
