= Madeleine Redfern =

Canadian politician

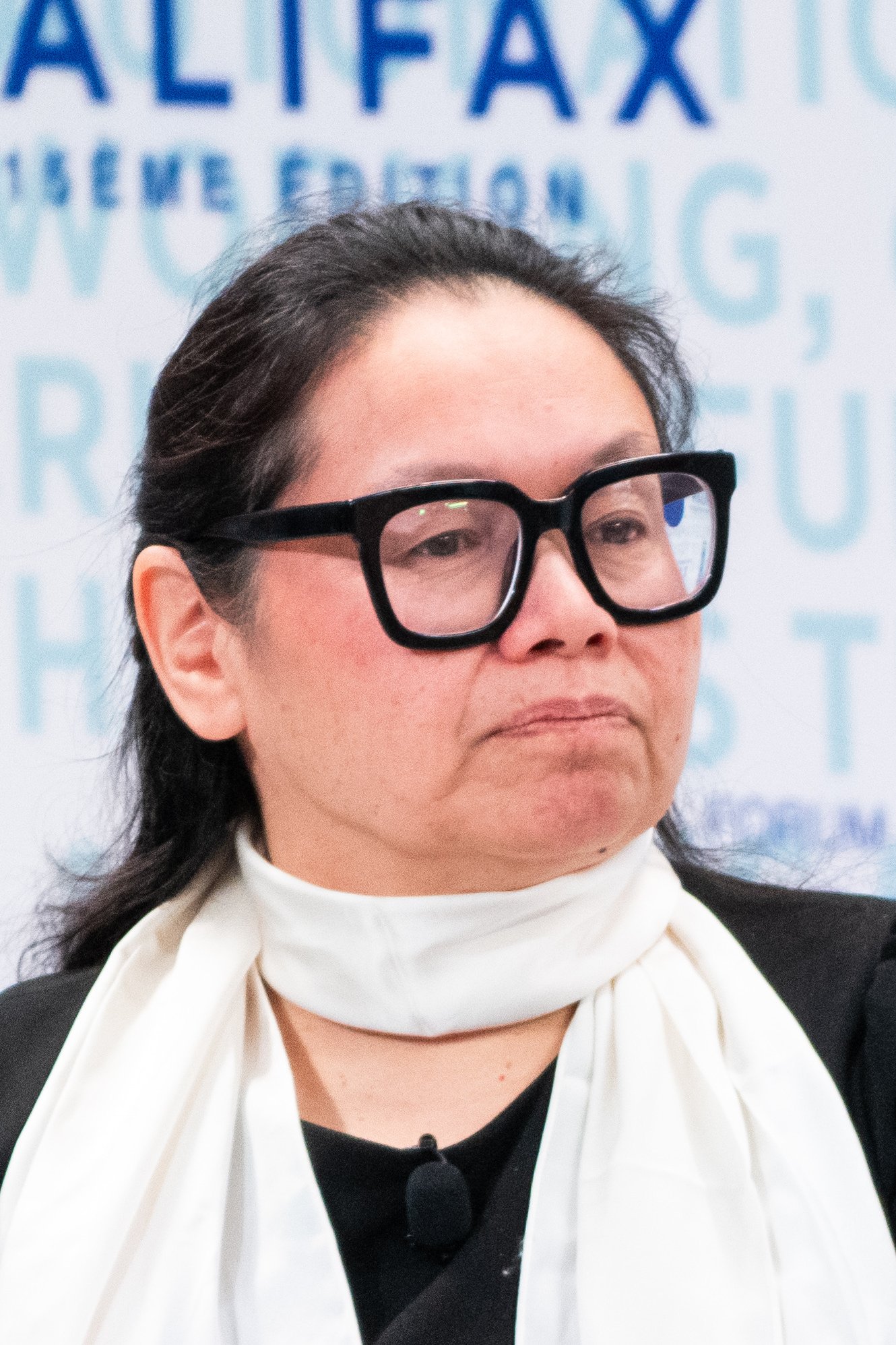
- Redfern at the 2023 Halifax International Security Forum

Mayor of Iqaluit, Nunavut
- In office 2015 – 5 November 2019
- Preceded by: Mary Wilman
- Succeeded by: Kenny Bell
- In office 17 December 2010 – 20 October 2012
- Preceded by: Elisapee Sheutiapik
- Succeeded by: John Graham

Personal details
- Born: 1967 (age 58–59) Frobisher Bay, Northwest Territories, Canada
- Occupation: politician

Madeleine Redfern (born 1967) is a Canadian Inuk politician, who was elected mayor of Iqaluit, Nunavut in a by-election on 13 December 2010. She was the city's mayor until 2019.

She was born in Iqaluit (then called Frobisher Bay, Northwest Territories). Redfern graduated from the Akitsiraq Law School before becoming the first Inuk to be offered a clerkship at the Supreme Court of Canada. She was selected by outgoing Justice Louise Arbour to clerk under her replacement, Justice Louise Charron.

Redfern is a businessperson, consultant and social advocate in Iqaluit, and was most recently the executive director of the Qikiqtani Truth Commission, looking into the legacy of historical effects of federal government policies on Eastern Arctic Inuit during the period from the 1950s through the 1980s. She ran as a candidate for the Legislative Assembly of Nunavut in the 2008 territorial election in Iqaluit Centre, but lost to incumbent MLA Hunter Tootoo.

She is an outspoken critic of Nunavut's government. "We live in a chilly banana republic," she said of the territorial government, a short time before becoming mayor.

On 24 July 2012, Redfern announced at a meeting of the Iqaluit City Council that she would not run for re-election in the next election. She was succeeded in that fall's municipal election by John Graham, but Graham resigned two years into his term and was succeeded by Mary Wilman. In the 2015 election, Redfern ran for mayor again, defeating Wilman.

== Electoral record ==
2015 Mayoral election
| Mayoral Candidate | Vote | % |
| Madeleine Redfern | 1,005 | 59.40 |
| Mary Wilman | 527 | 31.15 |
| Noah Paptsie | 160 | 9.46 |

Iqaluit mayoral by-election, 2010
| Name | Vote | % |
| Madeleine Redfern | 377 | 30.26 |
| Allen Hayward | 314 | 25.20 |
| Paul Kaludjak | 314 | 25.20 |
| Jim Little | 241 | 19.34 |
| Total Valid Ballots | 1246 | 100% |
| Voter Turnout % | Rejected Ballots: 16 | |

2008 Nunavut general election
| Name | Vote | % |
| Hunter Tootoo | 356 | 62.2% |
| Madeleine Redfern | 160 | 27.9% |
| Joe Sageaktook | 57 | 9.9% |
| Total Valid Ballots | 573 | 100% |
| Voter Turnout: 61.2% | Rejected Ballots 3 | |
