= Nancy Karetak-Lindell =

Canadian politician

The Honourable Nancy Karetak-Lindell
- ᓇᓐᓰ ᑲᕆᑕᒃ-ᓕᓐᑎᓪ
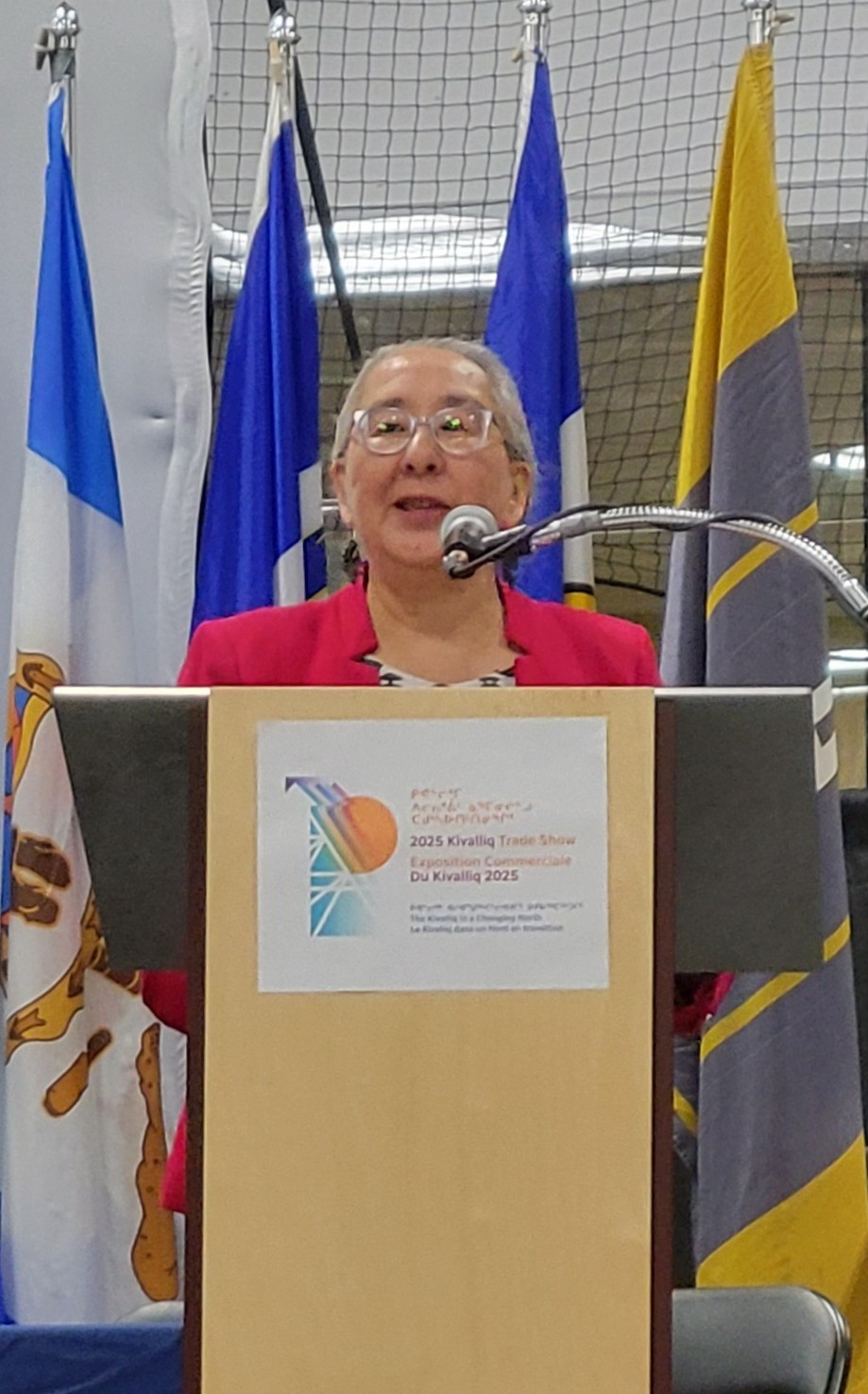
- Karetak-Lindell in 2025

Senator from Nunavut
- Incumbent
- Assumed office December 19, 2024
- Nominated by: Justin Trudeau
- Appointed by: Mary Simon
- Preceded by: Dennis Patterson

Member of Parliament for Nunavut (Note: The riding was created in 1976 as "Nunatsiaq" from parts of the Northwest Territories riding. It was renamed "Nunavut" in 1996.)
- In office June 2, 1997 – October 14, 2008
- Preceded by: Jack Anawak
- Succeeded by: Leona Aglukkaq

Personal details
- Born: December 10, 1957 (age 68) Eskimo Point, Northwest Territories
- Party: Liberal
- Spouse: widowed – Jon Lindell (died 1998)
- Profession: Canadian politician, financial comptroller

Nancy Uqquujuq Karetak-Lindell CM (born December 10, 1957) is a politician who has served as a senator from Nunavut since December 2024 and was previously an MP in the Canadian House of Commons from 1997 to 2008.

Senator Karetak-Lindell is a member of the Independent Senators Group.

== Early life and career ==
She was born in Eskimo Point, Northwest Territories (now Arviat, Nunavut) and is Inuk.

Prior to politics, she was a financial comptroller and held councillor positions for the Municipal Hamlet and District Education Authority in Arviat, Nunavut.

She was director of the Jane Glassco Arctic Fellowship Program from 2009 until 2012. Karetak-Lindell served as president of the Inuit Circumpolar Council Canada and has been Chief Returning Officer for multiple Inuit organization elections and has worked for Elections Nunavut.

Karetak-Lindell had been on the board of directors of the Nunavut Development Corporation, the Nunavut Business Credit Corporation, the Kivalliq Inuit Association, Katimavik, Northwest Territories Power Corporation, Northwestel, Polar Knowledge Canada and Thebacha College that transitioned into Arctic College and then, after division of the territories, Nunavut Arctic College. She is currently on the board for Nunavut Trust and a member of the Task Force on Women in the Economy.

== Political career ==
Karetak-Lindell ran for a seat in the House of Commons of Canada as a Liberal candidate during the 1997 federal election in the riding of Nunavut, becoming the first female MP for the Eastern Arctic. She was re-elected in the 2000, 2004 and 2006 elections.

She was the parliamentary secretary to the Minister of Natural Resources in 2003. She also served as the chair as well as the vice-chair of the Standing Committee on Aboriginal Affairs and Northern Development, a member of the Liaison Committee, Fisheries and Oceans Standing Committee, an associate member of both the Standing Committee on Canadian Heritage and the Standing Committee on Human Resources, Social Development and the Status of Persons with Disabilities.

Karetak-Lindell kept her seat in the 2006 federal election, but later announced she would not seek re-election in the 2008 election and wished to spend more time in the company of her family and to take care of her elderly parents.

== Senate ==
On December 19, 2024, she was summoned to the Senate of Canada by Governor General Mary Simon, on the advice of prime minister Justin Trudeau.

== Personal life and awards ==
In 2022, she was named as a Member of the Order of Canada.

She is the mother to four sons.

== Electoral record ==
2006 Canadian federal election: Nunavut
Party	Candidate	Votes	%	±%	Expenditures
Liberal	Nancy Karetak-Lindell	3,673	39.98	–11.32	$12,071.37
Conservative	David Aglukark, Sr.	2,670	29.06	+14.61	$5,370.77
New Democratic	Bill Riddell	1,576	17.15	+1.98	$10,970.97
Marijuana	D. Ed deVries	724	7.88	–	$1,091.59
Green	Feliks Kappi	544	5.92	+2.59	$3,950.47
Total valid votes/expense limit		9,187	99.31	–	$74,506.20
Total rejected ballots		64	0.69	+0.25	
Turnout		9,251	54.14	+10.28	
Eligible voters		17,088			
Liberal hold		Swing		–12.97	
Source: Elections Canada

2004 Canadian federal election: Nunavut
Party	Candidate	Votes	%	±%	Expenditures
Liberal	Nancy Karetak-Lindell	3,818	51.30	–17.71	$18,335.39
Independent	Manitok Thompson	1,172	15.75	–	$4,340.30
New Democratic	Bill Riddell	1,129	15.17	–3.10	$12,450.33
Conservative	Duncan Cunningham	1,075	14.45	+6.25	$17,541.66
Green	Nedd Kenney	248	3.33	–1.19	$530.91
Total valid votes/expense limit		7,442	99.56	–	$72,617.32
Total rejected ballots		33	0.44	–0.25	
Turnout		7,475	43.86	–10.24	
Eligible voters		17,041			
Liberal hold		Swing		–16.73	
Change for the Conservatives is based on the results of the Progressive Conservatives.
Source: Elections Canada

2000 Canadian federal election: Nunavut
Party	Candidate	Votes	%	±%	Expenditures
Liberal	Nancy Karetak-Lindell	5,327	69.01	+23.12	$35,282
New Democratic	Palluq Susan Enuaraq	1,410	18.27	–5.49	none listed
Progressive Conservative	Mike Sherman	633	8.20	–15.94	$6,045
Green	Brian Robert Jones	349	4.52	–	$9,304
Total valid votes		7,719	99.31		
Total rejected ballots		54	0.69	+0.03	
Turnout		7,773	54.10	–5.70	
Eligible voters		14,369			
Liberal hold		Swing		+14.32	
Source: Elections Canada

1997 Canadian federal election: Nunavut
Party	Candidate	Votes	%	±%	Expenditures
Liberal	Nancy Karetak-Lindell	3,302	45.89	−23.87	$30,212
Progressive Conservative	Okalik Eegeesiak	1,737	24.14	+3.54	$11,251
New Democratic	Hunter Tootoo	1,710	23.76	+14.10	$11,918
Reform	John Turner	447	6.21	–	none listed
Total valid votes		7,196	99.34		
Total rejected ballots		48	0.66	–	
Turnout		7,244	59.80	–	
Eligible voters		12,114			
Liberal notional hold		Swing		−13.70	
Source: Elections Canada
