= Peter Ittinuar =

Canadian politician

The Honourable Peter Ittinuar
- ᐲᑎᕐ ᐃᑦᑎᓄᐊᕐ

Member of the Canadian Parliament for Nunatsiaq
- In office 22 May 1979 – 4 September 1984
- Preceded by: Riding established
- Succeeded by: Thomas Suluk

Personal details
- Born: January 19, 1950 (age 76) Chesterfield Inlet, Northwest Territories (Now Nunavut)
- Party: New Democratic Party (1979-1982, 1993-2008); Liberal Party (1982-1984); Independent (1984-1993); Green Party (2008-present)

Peter Freuchen K. Ittinuar (Inuktitut: ᐲᑎᕐ ᐃᑦᑎᓄᐊᕐ; born January 19, 1950) is a Canadian politician. He was the first Inuk in Canada to be elected as an MP, and represented the electoral district of Nunatsiaq in the House of Commons of Canada from 1979 to 1984.

== Biography ==
=== Early life ===
Ittinuar, the grandson of Danish explorer, Peter Freuchen, was born in Chesterfield Inlet, Northwest Territories (now Nunavut). He spent part of his youth and adolescence being educated in Ottawa, Ontario, with two childhood friends, Zebedee Nungak and Eric Tagoona. All three later were important figures in advocating for the rights of the Inuit. Unbeknownst to them, they had been relocated to Ottawa by federal government authorities, as part of an experiment in cultural assimilation. These actions and their consequences form the subject of the documentary The Experimental Eskimos (2009).

=== Political career ===
Ittinuar was originally elected as a member of the New Democratic Party, but on November 26, 1982, he crossed the floor to sit with the Liberal caucus shortly after Indian Affairs and Northern Development minister John Munro announced plans to improve Inuit self-government by dividing the Northwest Territories into two (see Nunavut).

In 1984 Ittinuar was charged with breach of trust, theft and forgery for allegedly using his parliamentary budget to purchase a boat motor. As a result of the court case he was suspended from the Liberal Party caucus, and he became an independent for the final few months of his term in office. Ittinuar ran for re-election in the 1984 federal election, but was defeated by the Progressive Conservative candidate Thomas Suluk.

Ittinuar was later found not guilty on the 1984 breach of trust, theft and forgery charges. However, Ittinuar had earlier, in 1979, been convicted of possession of a small amount of cocaine. In addition, in 1986, he was convicted of assaulting his then wife, Susan Munro, daughter of former Liberal Cabinet Minister John Munro, and was fined.

In 1993, Ittinuar again sought the NDP nomination in Nunatsiaq, but was unable to do so, due to then NDP leader Audrey McLaughlin refusing to endorse his candidacy.

In 2008, while living in southern Ontario, Ittinuar ran unsuccessfully for the Green Party in the Nunavut riding in the federal election. He had previously sought and lost the Green Party nomination in the southern Ontario riding of Brant.

== Electoral record ==
2008 Canadian federal election: Nunavut
Party	Candidate	Votes	%	±%	Expenditures
Conservative	Leona Aglukkaq	2,806	34.78	+5.72	$59,574
Liberal	Kirt Ejesiak	2,359	29.24	−10.74	$59,600
New Democratic	Paul Irngaut	2,228	27.62	+10.47	$20,095
Green	Peter Ittinuar	675	8.37	+2.45	
Total valid votes/expense limit		8,068	100.0		$80,098
Conservative gain from Liberal		Swing		+8.23	

1984 Canadian federal election: Nunatsiaq
Party	Candidate	Votes	%	±%
Progressive Conservative	Thomas Suluk	2,237	32.49	+24.71
Liberal	Robert Kuptana	1,990	28.90	−12.90
New Democratic	Rhoda Innuksuk	1,973	28.65	−18.61
Independent	Peter Ittinuar	686	9.96	–
Total valid votes		6,886	100.00	
Progressive Conservative gain from New Democratic		Swing		+18.80
Independent candidate Peter Ittinuar lost 37.31 percentage points from the 1980 election, when he ran as a New Democrat.

1980 Canadian federal election: Nunatsiaq
Party	Candidate	Votes	%	±%
New Democratic	Peter Ittinuar	2,688	47.27	+10.99
Liberal	James Arvaluk	2,377	41.80	+15.81
Progressive Conservative	Lyle Stevenson	442	7.77	−18.22
Rhinoceros	Lloyd Ellsworth	180	3.17	–
Total valid votes		5,687	100.00	
New Democratic hold		Swing		−2.41
lop.parl.ca

1979 Canadian federal election: Nunatsiaq
Party	Candidate	Votes	%
New Democratic	Peter Ittinuar	1,963	37.74
Liberal	Tagak Curley	1,887	36.27
Progressive Conservative	Abe Okpik	1,352	25.99
Total valid votes		5,202	100.00
This riding was created from part of Northwest Territories, where New Democrat Wally Firth was the incumbent.
