= Leona Aglukkaq =

Canadian politician (born 1967)

The Honourable Leona Aglukkaq PC
- ᓕᐅᓇ ᐊᒡᓘᒃᑲᖅ
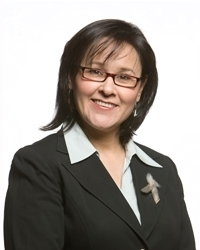

Minister of the Environment
- In office July 15, 2013 – November 4, 2015
- Prime Minister: Stephen Harper
- Preceded by: Peter Kent
- Succeeded by: Catherine McKenna

Minister of Health
- In office October 30, 2008 – July 15, 2013
- Prime Minister: Stephen Harper
- Preceded by: Tony Clement
- Succeeded by: Rona Ambrose

Member of Parliament for Nunavut
- In office October 14, 2008 – October 19, 2015
- Preceded by: Nancy Karetak-Lindell
- Succeeded by: Hunter Tootoo

Member of the Nunavut Legislative Assembly for Nattilik
- In office February 16, 2004 – September 10, 2008
- Preceded by: Uriash Puqiqnak
- Succeeded by: Enuk Pauloosie

Personal details
- Born: June 28, 1967 (age 59) Inuvik, Northwest Territories, Canada
- Party: Conservative
- Spouse: Robbie MacNeil
- Children: Cooper

Leona Aglukkaq PC (Inuktitut syllabics: ᓕᐅᓇ ᐊᒡᓘᒃᑲᖅ; born June 28, 1967) is a Canadian politician. She was a member of the non-partisan Legislative Assembly of Nunavut representing the riding of Nattilik from 2004 until stepping down in 2008; then was a Conservative Member of Parliament representing the riding of Nunavut after winning the seat in the 2008 federal election. She was the first Conservative to win the seat, and only the second centre-right candidate ever to win it. Leona Aglukkaq is the first Inuk woman to serve in cabinet. She remained an MP until she was defeated in the 2015 federal election by Liberal candidate Hunter Tootoo. Aglukkaq unsuccessfully contested the 2019 federal election.

== Life ==
Aglukkaq was born in Inuvik, Northwest Territories and raised in Thom Bay, Taloyoak and Gjoa Haven (formerly in the Northwest Territories, the latter two are now in Nunavut). She is married to Robbie MacNeil and has a son, Cooper.

Prior to running as an MP, Aglukkaq served on the Hamlet Council of Cambridge Bay. She was also a Government of Nunavut public servant, working for the Office of the Clerk of the Nunavut Legislature, and as the Deputy Minister of Culture, Language, Elders and Youth. Information regarding Aglukkaq's post-secondary education has never been made public.

Since 2021, she's been on the Board of Directors at Agnico Eagle Mines Limited.

== Political career ==
=== Territorial politics ===
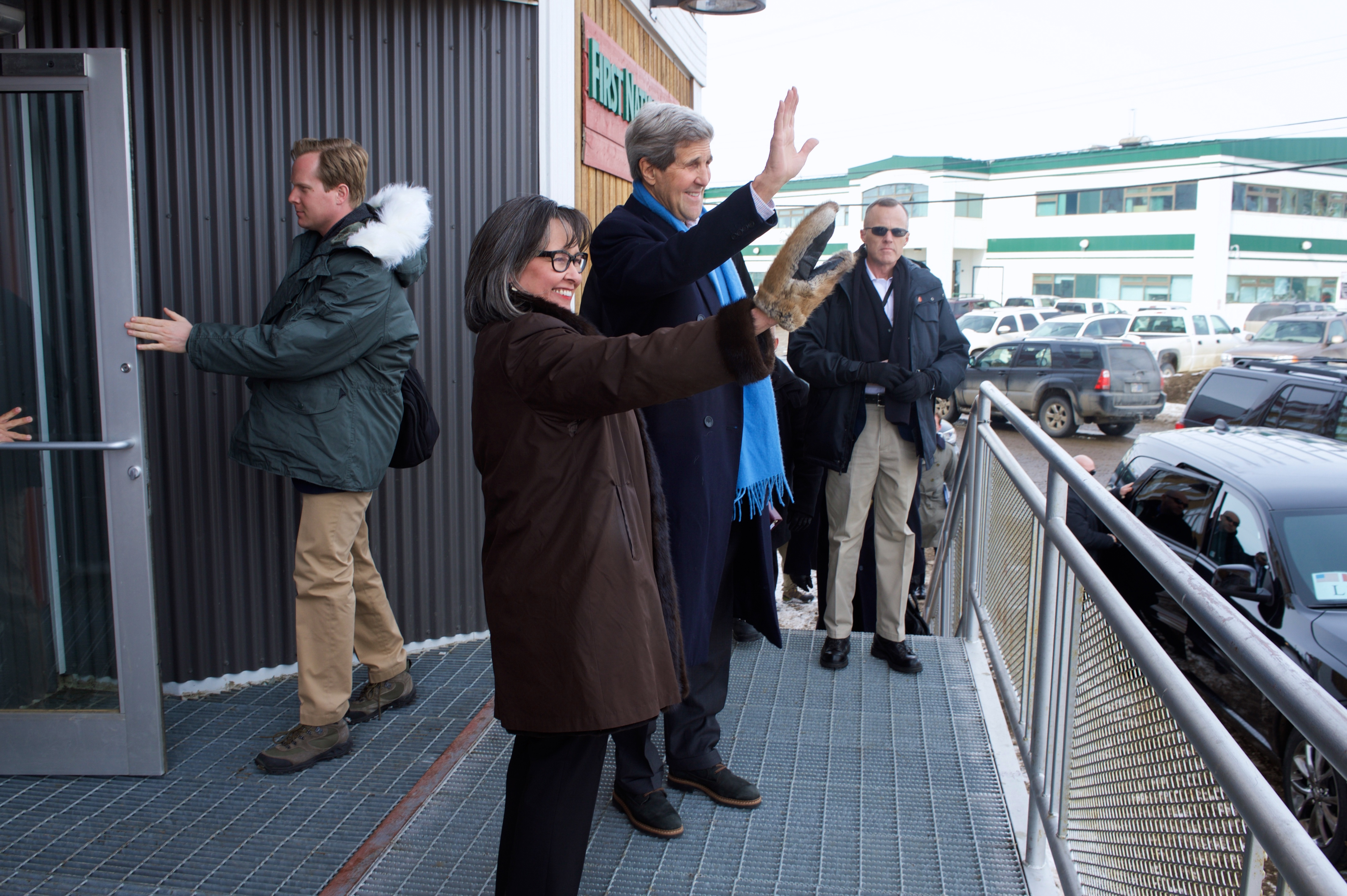
Arctic Council Chairman Leona Aglukkaq and U.S. Secretary of State John Kerry wave to people in her hometown of Iqaluit

First elected to the Legislative Assembly of Nunavut representing the electoral district of Nattilik in the 2004 Nunavut election, she held the seat until stepping down on September 10, 2008 to run in the federal election. She was the Minister of Health and Social Services and the Minister Responsible for the Status of Women in the Executive Council of Nunavut.

=== Federal politics ===
==== Minister of Health ====
Aglukkaq was named the Minister of Health on October 30, 2008, and is the first Inuk in Canadian history to be appointed to the Cabinet of Canada. Jack Anawak and Nancy Karetak-Lindell previously held parliamentary secretary positions, which are not part of the cabinet itself.

Considerable public attention was focused on Aglukkaq during the 2009 swine flu pandemic where hundreds of Canadians were infected with the H1N1 virus. The Liberal health critic said that Aglukkaq was doing a "terrific job," and especially liked how the minister phoned all opposition critics to build consensus on the swine flu issue.

Health Canada officials sent two dozen body bags, normally sent to hospitals, to a Manitoba First Nation. The move was criticized by Aglukkaq, the Liberal and New Democratic opposition parties in Parliament, and First Nations leaders. An investigation ordered by Aglukkaq found "no evidence of ill will or deliberate calculation," though First Nations representatives in Manitoba criticized the inquiry's report for downplaying the incident.

Following the outbreak, Aglukkaq appeared on various television shows, including CBC News Network's Power and Politics with Evan Solomon, underlining the government's immunization plan.

In 2009, the World Health Organization called for the elimination of artificial trans fats from the world food supply. Surveys at the time indicated that 90% of Canadian adults and children still exceeded the recommended daily limits on trans fats. A Health Canada analysis suggested a ban could prevent 12,000 heart attacks over 20 years, saving the health care system $9 billion. Internal documents showed Health Canada prepared to finally announce a full ban on trans fats, drafting the regulations and a press release, until the office of health minister Aglukkaq scrapped those plans. She later acknowledged the rules would be a burden on the food industry.

Aglukkaq was criticised by public health officials for refusing to sign the Vienna Declaration on drug policy reform, which deemed "the evidence that law enforcement has failed to prevent the availability of illegal drugs [...] unambiguous," and called for a "science-based approach" based on harm reduction strategies such as needle exchange programs and supervised injection sites, because the Declaration was in conflict with the Conservative government's long-established prohibition-centered approach.

==== Re-election and continued incumbency ====
Aglukkaq was reelected in 2011 with nearly 50 percent of the vote, defeating a field of challengers which included former Premier of Nunavut Paul Okalik, who ran as the Liberal nominee. She was the first centre-right MP in the history of the riding to win a second term.

On August 23, 2012, Prime Minister Stephen Harper announced that Aglukkaq would serve as chair of the Arctic Council when Canada assumed the Chairmanship from Sweden in May 2013.

Aglukkaq gave no indication of support for the nationwide Idle No More protests in 2012/13, and called on Chief Theresa Spence to give up her hunger strike, abandon her request to meet with the Prime Minister and the Governor General of Canada, and instead speak to Aboriginal Affairs Minister John Duncan.

==== Minister of Environment ====
On July 15, 2013, Aglukkaq was named Minister of the Environment, which includes responsibility for Parks Canada, the Canadian Environmental Assessment Agency and Environment Canada.

In December 2014, Aglukkaq apologized for reading a newspaper while opposition parties asked the government about high food prices in the North during Question Period. During the 2015 Canadian federal election, Paul Okalik, Nunavut's Health and Justice Minister expressed his discontent with Aglukkaq's actions by reading a newspaper whenever Aglukkaq spoke at the Canadian Broadcasting Corporation election forum in Iqaluit.

In the election, Aglukkaq lost almost half of her vote share from 2011 (even allowing for a turnout nearly double that of the previous election) and was pushed into third place behind Liberal candidate and former Legislative Assembly speaker Hunter Tootoo and NDP candidate and former MP Jack Anawak. It was one of the larger defeats suffered by a member of Harper's cabinet.

Aglukkaq ran again for the Conservatives in the 2019 Canadian federal election, and again came in third. The election was won by NDP candidate Mumilaaq Qaqqaq.

== Electoral history ==
=== Federal ===
2019 Canadian federal election: Nunavut
Party	Candidate	Votes	%	±%	Expenditures
New Democratic	Mumilaaq Qaqqaq	3,861	40.84	+14.26	$5,331.45
Liberal	Megan Pizzo Lyall	2,918	30.87	–16.24	$29,996.72
Conservative	Leona Aglukkaq	2,469	26.12	+1.34	$16,176.33
Green	Douglas Roy	206	2.18	+0.65	none listed
Total valid votes/expense limit		9,454	99.08	–	$103,762.32
Total rejected ballots		88	0.92	+0.13	
Turnout		9,542	47.65	–11.72	
Eligible voters		20,025			
New Democratic gain from Liberal		Swing		+15.25	
Source: Elections Canada

2015 Canadian federal election: Nunavut
Party	Candidate	Votes	%	±%	Expenditures
Liberal	Hunter Tootoo	5,619	47.11	+18.41	$31,498.80
New Democratic	Jack Anawak	3,171	26.58	+7.21	$10,713.72
Conservative	Leona Aglukkaq	2,956	24.78	–25.12	$36,393.17
Green	Spencer Rocchi	182	1.53	–0.50	none listed
Total valid votes/expense limit		11,928	99.21	–	$203,887.65
Total rejected ballots		95	0.79	+0.08	
Turnout		12,023	59.37	+13.66	
Eligible voters		20,252			
Liberal gain from Conservative		Swing		+21.77	
Source: Elections Canada

2011 Canadian federal election: Nunavut
Party	Candidate	Votes	%	±%	Expenditures
Conservative	Leona Aglukkaq	3,930	49.90	+14.98	$65,818.65
Liberal	Paul Okalik	2,260	28.70	–0.44	$47,519.13
New Democratic	Jack Hicks	1,525	19.37	–8.27	$7,332.23
Green	Scott MacCallum	160	2.03	–6.27	none listed
Total valid votes/expense limit		7,875	99.29	–	$83,225.70
Total rejected ballots		56	0.71	+0.33	
Turnout		7,931	45.71	–1.64	
Eligible voters		17,349			
Conservative hold		Swing		+7.71	
Source: Elections Canada

2008 Canadian federal election: Nunavut
Party	Candidate	Votes	%	±%	Expenditures
Conservative	Leona Aglukkaq	2,815	34.92	+5.86	$50,734.44
Liberal	Kirt Kootoo Ejesiak	2,349	29.14	–10.84	$74,987.51
New Democratic	Paul Irngaut	2,228	27.64	+10.49	$19,883.34
Green	Peter Ittinuar	669	8.30	+2.38	none listed
Total valid votes/expense limit		8,061	99.62	–	$80,097.64
Total rejected ballots		31	0.38	–0.31	
Turnout		8,092	47.35	–6.79	
Eligible voters		17,089			
Conservative gain from Liberal		Swing		+8.35	
Source: Elections Canada

=== Territorial ===
2004 Nunavut general election: Nattilik
Name	Vote	%
Leona Aglukkaq	305	42.84%
David Irqiut	203	28.51%
Anthony Anguttitauruq	130	18.26%
Simon Qingnaqtuq	30	4.21%
Ruediger H. J. Rasch	28	3.93%
Sonny Porter	11	1.55%
Tom Akoak	5	0.70%
Total Valid Ballots	712	100%
Voter Turnout 107.04%	Rejected Ballots 3	

== See also ==
- Arctic Cooperation and Politics
- Arctic policy of Canada

28th Canadian Ministry (2006–2015) – Cabinet of Stephen Harper
Cabinet posts (3)
Predecessor	Office	Successor
Peter Kent	Minister of the Environment from 15-Jul-2013 to 4-Nov-2015	Catherine McKenna
Tony Clement	Minister of Health from 30-Oct-2008 to 15-Jul-2013	Rona Ambrose
John Duncan	Minister of the Canadian Northern Economic Development Agency from 18-May-2011 to 4-Nov-2015	none
