= Lori Idlout =

Canadian politician (born 1974)

Lori Idlout MP
- ᓘᕆ ᐃᓪᓚᐅᖅ
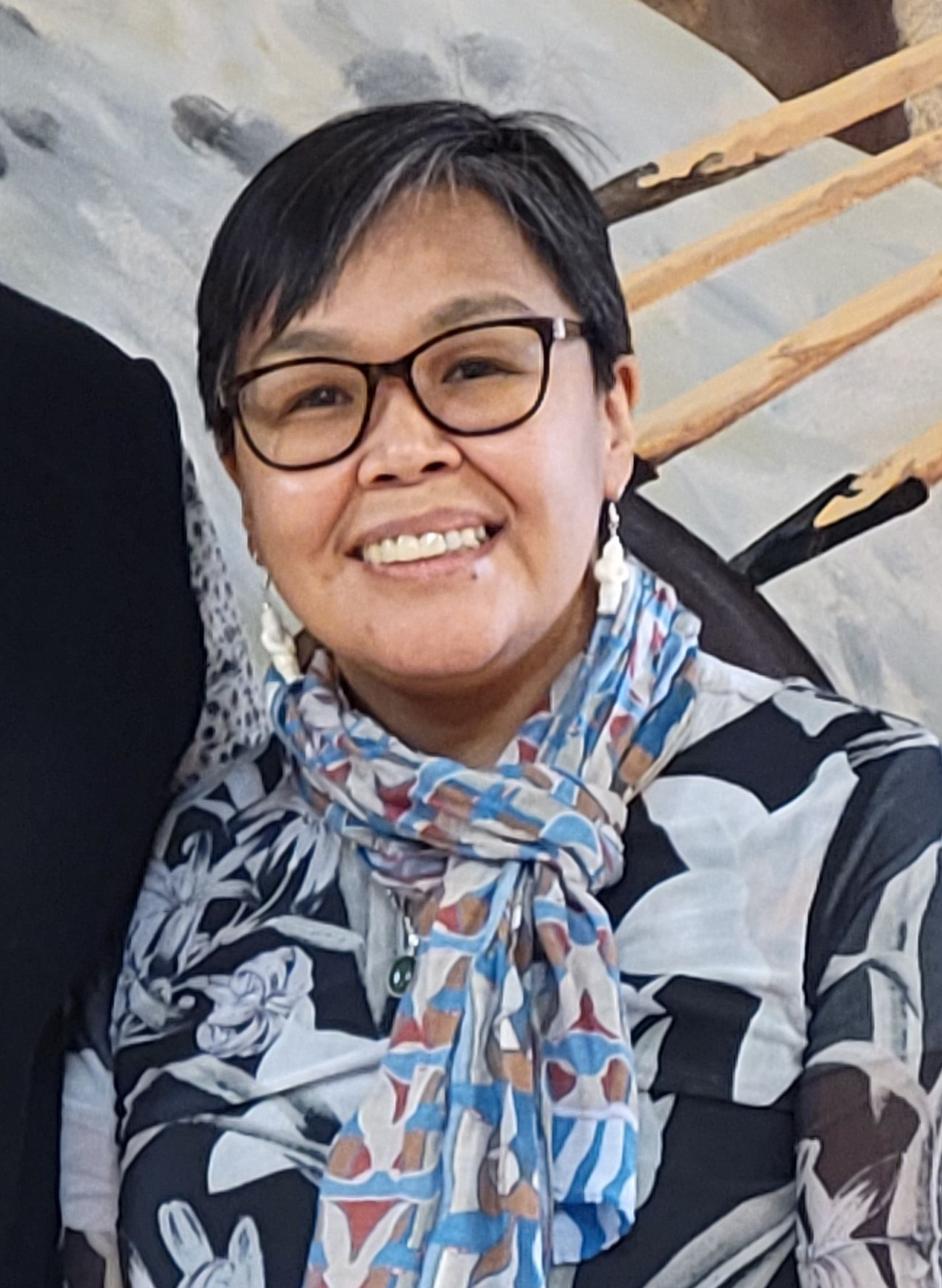
- Idlout in 2022

Member of Parliament for Nunavut
- Incumbent
- Assumed office September 20, 2021
- Preceded by: Mumilaaq Qaqqaq

Personal details
- Born: March 28, 1974 (age 52) Igloolik, Northwest Territories (present day Nunavut), Canada
- Party: Liberal (since 2026)
- Other political affiliations: New Democratic (until 2026)
- Profession: Politician; lawyer; policy analyst; entrepreneur; non-profit director

Lori Idlout (Inuktitut: ᓘᕆ ᐃᓪᓚᐅᖅ, romanized: Luuri Illauq; born March 28, 1974) is a Canadian Inuit politician and lawyer who has served as the member of Parliament (MP) for Nunavut since 2021. A member of the Liberal Party, Idlout was first elected with the New Democratic Party (NDP), before crossing the floor in 2026.

== Life and career ==
Idlout was raised with three siblings and grew up in an area of the Northwest Territories (now part of Nunavut) as a child. Her family moved between the communities of Igloolik, Pond Inlet, Rankin Inlet, and Chesterfield Inlet. Idlout spent the most time in Igloolik, and currently resides there.

Idlout received a bachelor's degree in psychology from Lakehead University in 1997, and a Juris Doctor from the University of Ottawa (2018).

Between 2004 and 2011, Idlout served as the executive director of the Nunavut Embrace Life Council, a not-for-profit organization committed to suicide prevention. Idlout's time as its executive director saw expansion to its services and securing a budget to address issues of mental health. Idlout had previously worked for Nunavut's Department of Health and Nunavut Tunngavik Incorporated as a policy analyst, and was the founder of Coalition of Nunavut DEAs as a director of the Iqaluit District Education Authority in order to advocate for educational services.

Before her election, Idlout practiced law in Iqaluit with her own firm, Qusugaq Law. She represented the group protesting against the Baffinland Iron Mine's expansion, as well as serving as the technical adviser for the Ikajutit Hunters and Trappers Organization during a public hearing on the issue.

She owns Carvings Nunavut, an art and carvings gallery. In 2026, it was reported that Idlout had reimbursed the House of Commons for expensing items purchased from her own business "in error."

== Political career ==
Idlout sought the NDP nomination in Nunavut when incumbent MP Mumilaaq Qaqqaq, also a New Democrat, did not seek re-election after one term in Parliament. Idlout's nomination meeting vote was tied with Inuk educational YouTuber Aliqa Illauq. On August 10, 2021, Idlout secured the New Democratic Party's nomination to run as their candidate for the riding of Nunavut by a coin toss, a first for the territory, and was elected at the 2021 Canadian federal election. The Library of Parliament notes that Idlout is the first MP to be sworn in in Inuktitut.

She was narrowly re-elected in the 2025 federal election, outpacing Liberal candidate Kilikvak Kabloona by just 41 votes. In January 2026, Idlout stated that she considered crossing the floor and joining the Liberal Party, and did so in March 2026. She became the fourth MP to join the Liberal caucus during the 45th Canadian Parliament, after Chris d'Entremont, Michael Ma, and Matt Jeneroux. Idlout is the first NDP MP to do so, as her three predecessors joined the Liberals from the Conservative caucus. Idlout explained her decision by saying that she felt she was "betraying [her] constituents" by remaining in the NDP caucus.

== Policy positions ==
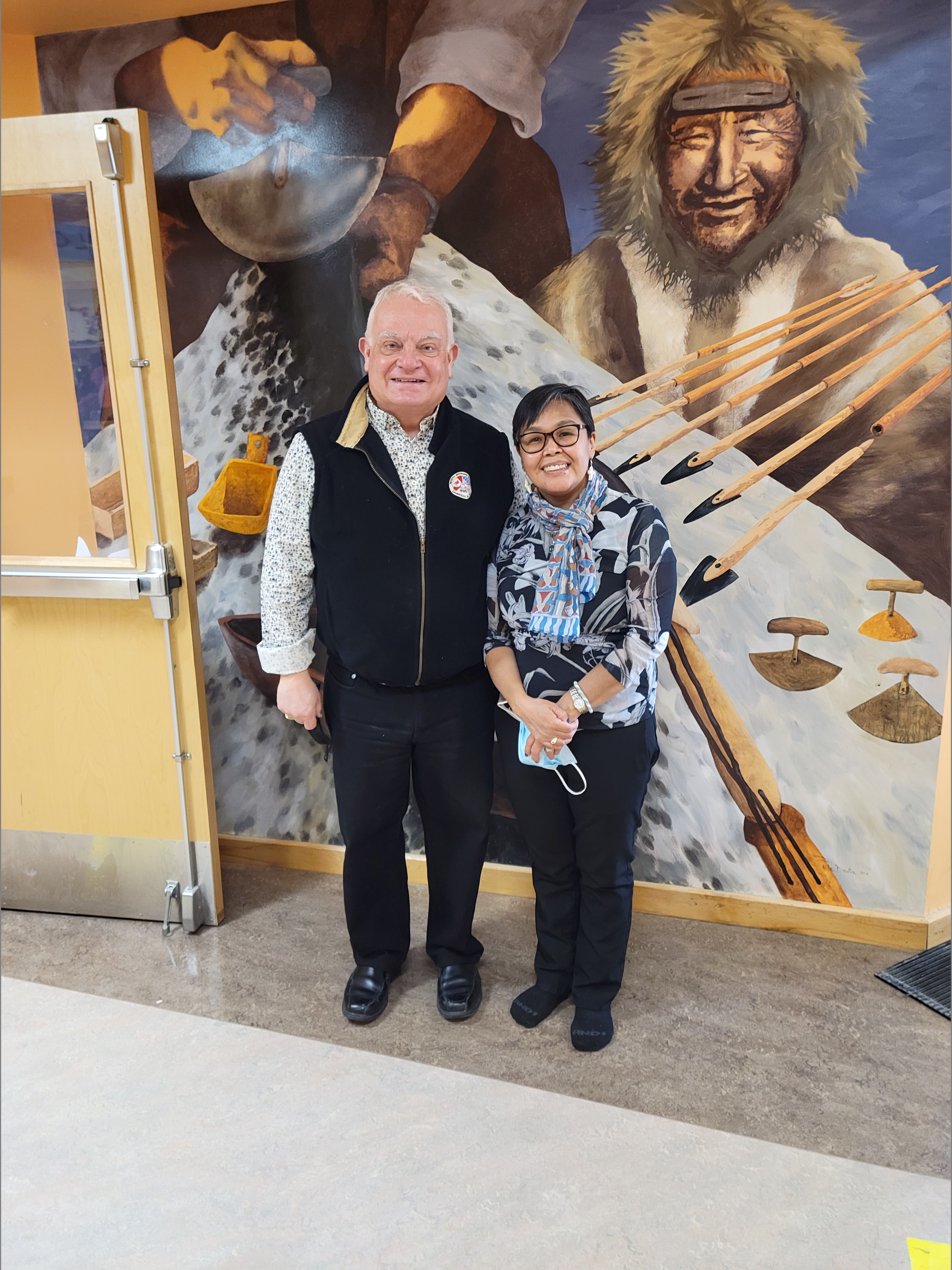
Idlout with Kullik Elementary School principal Jeff Avery in 2022

Idlout told Carol Off of CBC Radio's As It Happens that she intended to work on shifting the balance between the federal government and the people of Nunavut. She discussed that while the federal government wished to acquire Nunavut's resources, she wanted to "get the federal government to realize that [Nunavummiut] can negotiate ... in a position of power." Idlout stated she wanted to see the territory benefit more from the ongoing mining and exploration conducted within its land.

During her campaign, Idlout prioritized on youth engagement within the electoral process. She raised the issue of youth empowerment within her election tour.

=== Housing and infrastructure ===
Idlout stated her utmost priority was addressing the housing crisis in the North, which included more housing as well as housing quality and renovation; addressing the mold crisis that many houses had. Idlout acknowledged the adverse health outcomes that came as a result of poor living conditions and as a result of mold and the disproportionate effects it would have on the elderly. She expressed her concern that the incumbent Liberal government would fail to properly address the housing situation in the North, stating Trudeau "promised more housing funds for the last six years".

Idlout stated she intended to work with the government for further infrastructure upgrades, including rural broadband and improvement for airports within the territory.

=== Mining and resource management ===
In reaction to Baffinland's proposed Mary River Mine expansion, Idlout stated that the current plan as it stood should not go through. Idlout stressed the importance of consultation with local communities regarding the issue, and that the mine had already had an outsized impact on the local environment. She cited the waste material that was produced as a result of the mining in the area, and that Baffinland should work with Inuit to address the issues raised.

=== Elder care ===
Idlout expressed her concerns for the relocation of community elders to Edmonton and Ottawa as a result of the lack of proper facilities for elder care in Nunavut. She expressed her support for the creation of the proper facilities within the territory to enable elders to remain within their own communities, thus creating further employment opportunities within the territory. Idlout also stated the financial supplements for elders within the territory was "inadequate" and addressed the possibility of raising the supplement for northern communities.

== Electoral record ==
2025 Canadian federal election: Nunavut
Party	Candidate	Votes	%	±%	Expenditures
New Democratic	Lori Idlout	2,853	37.26	–10.41	$50,461.81
Liberal	Kilikvak Kabloona	2,812	36.72	+0.86	$60,292.85
Conservative	James T. Arreak	1,992	26.02	+9.55	$14,525.05
Total valid votes/expense limit		7,657	98.84	–	$125,501.31
Total rejected ballots		90	1.16	+0.06	
Turnout		7,747	35.36	+2.26	
Eligible voters		21,912			
New Democratic hold		Swing		–5.64	
Source: Elections Canada

2021 Canadian federal election: Nunavut
Party	Candidate	Votes	%	±%	Expenditures
New Democratic	Lori Idlout	3,277	46.55	+5.71	$64,249.91
Liberal	Pat Angnakak	2,578	36.62	+5.75	$46,353.02
Conservative	Laura Mackenzie	1,184	16.82	–9.30	$3,673.40
Total valid votes/expense limit		7,039	98.90	–	$108,435.17
Total rejected ballots		78	1.10	+0.18	
Turnout		7,117	33.10	–14.55	
Eligible voters		21,499			
New Democratic hold		Swing		+5.73	
Source: Elections Canada
