= Nunavut (electoral district) =

Federal electoral district in Nunavut, Canada

Coordinates: 73°N 91°W

Nunavut electoral district
- Nunavut riding in relation to Canada

Federal electoral district
- Legislature: House of Commons
MP
Lori Idlout
Liberal
- District created: 1976
- First contested: 1979
- Last contested: 2025
- District webpage: profile, map

Demographics
- Population (2021): 36,858
- Electors (2021): 18,665
- Area (km²): 1,836,993.78
- Pop. density (per km²): 0.02
- Census division(s): Kitikmeot Region, Kivalliq Region, Baffin Region
- Census subdivision(s): Iqaluit, Rankin Inlet, Arviat, Baker Lake, Igloolik, Cambridge Bay, Pond Inlet, Pangnirtung, Kinngait, Kugluktuk

Nunavut is a federal electoral district covering the entire territory of Nunavut, Canada, that has been represented in the House of Commons of Canada since 1979. Before 1997, it was known as Nunatsiaq and was one of two electoral districts in the Northwest Territories.

The riding is the largest federal electoral district by land area in Canada, and, since the abolition of the Division of Kalgoorlie in Western Australia, it is the second largest electoral district in the world after Yakutsk in Russia. It is also the world's northernmost single-member constituency, since Greenland elects two members to the Danish Folketing and uses proportional representation for its own Inatsisartut.

== Demographics ==
According to the 2021 Canadian census; 2013 representation

- Ethnic groups: 85.8% Indigenous, 10.6% White, 1.5% Black
- Languages: 52.2% Inuktitut, 33% English, 1.4% French
- Religions: 73.5% Christian (39.1% Anglican, 22.5% Catholic, 4% Pentecostal), 24.9% No religion
- Median income (2020): $37,600
- Average income (2020): $57,200

The Nunavut riding holds a host of demographic records:

- Lowest median age: 25.6 years
- Highest percentage of Indigenous peoples: 85.8%
- Highest percentage of Inuit: 84.3%
- Highest percentage of a non-official language as mother tongue: 54.9%
- Highest percentage of an Indigenous language as mother tongue: 52.9%
- Highest percentage of Inuktut (Inuit languages) as mother tongue: 52.9%
- Highest percentage of Inuktitut as mother tongue: 52.2%
- Highest percentage of a non-official language as home language: 42.2%
- Highest percentage of an Indigenous language as home language: 41.5%
- Highest percentage of Inuktut (Inuit languages) as mother tongue: 41.4%
- Highest percentage of Inuktitut as home language: 41.2%

== History ==
The riding was created in 1976 as "Nunatsiaq" from parts of the Northwest Territories riding. It was renamed "Nunavut" in 1996.

In 1999, the district's boundaries were redefined in the Nunavut Act, the law governing the creation of Nunavut as a separate jurisdiction from the Northwest Territories.

The boundaries of this riding were not changed in the 2012 electoral redistribution.

== Riding associations ==
Riding associations are the local branches of political parties:

Party	Association name	CEO	HQ city
Conservative	Conservative Party of Canada Nunavut Electoral District Association	Allen Hayward	Iqaluit
Liberal	Nunavut Federal Liberal Association	Ranbir S. Hundal	Iqaluit
New Democratic	Nunavut New Democratic Party Electoral District Association	Nikolai G. Sittman	Iqaluit

== Members of Parliament ==
This riding has elected the following members of parliament:

Parliament	Years	Member	Party
Nunatsiaq; Riding created from Northwest Territories
31st	1979–1980	Peter Ittinuar	New Democratic
32nd	1980–1982	Peter Ittinuar	New Democratic
32nd	1982–1984	Peter Ittinuar	Liberal
32nd	1984–1984	Peter Ittinuar	Independent
33rd	1984–1988	Thomas Suluk	Progressive Conservative
34th	1988–1993	Jack Anawak	Liberal
35th	1993–1997	Jack Anawak	Liberal
Nunavut
36th	1997–2000	Nancy Karetak-Lindell	Liberal
37th	2000–2004	Nancy Karetak-Lindell	Liberal
38th	2004–2006	Nancy Karetak-Lindell	Liberal
39th	2006–2008	Nancy Karetak-Lindell	Liberal
40th	2008–2011	Leona Aglukkaq	Conservative
41st	2011–2015	Leona Aglukkaq	Conservative
42nd	2015–2016	Hunter Tootoo	Liberal
42nd	2016–2019	Hunter Tootoo	Independent
43rd	2019–2021	Mumilaaq Qaqqaq	New Democratic
44th	2021–2025	Lori Idlout	New Democratic
45th	2025–2026	Lori Idlout	New Democratic
45th	2026–present	Lori Idlout	Liberal

== Election results ==
=== Nunavut ===
2025 Canadian federal election
Party	Candidate	Votes	%	±%	Expenditures
New Democratic	Lori Idlout	2,853	37.26	–10.41	
Liberal	Kilikvak Kabloona	2,812	36.72	+0.86	
Conservative	James T. Arreak	1,992	26.02	+9.55	
Total valid votes/expense limit		7,657			
Total rejected ballots		90			
Turnout		7,747	36.24		
Eligible voters		21,376			
New Democratic hold		Swing		−6.09	
Source: CBC, Elections Canada

2021 Canadian federal election
Party	Candidate	Votes	%	±%	Expenditures
New Democratic	Lori Idlout	3,427	47.67	+6.83	
Liberal	Pat Angnakak	2,578	35.86	+4.98	
Conservative	Laura Mackenzie	1,184	16.47	−9.65	
Total valid votes		7,189	98.93		
Total rejected ballots		78	1.07	−0.15	
Turnout		7,267	34.1	−17.0	
New Democratic hold		Swing		+0.93	
Source: Elections Canada

2019 Canadian federal election
Party	Candidate	Votes	%	±%	Expenditures
New Democratic	Mumilaaq Qaqqaq	3,861	40.84	+14.26	$5,618.37
Liberal	Megan Pizzo Lyall	2,918	30.87	-16.24	$41,679.84
Conservative	Leona Aglukkaq	2,469	26.12	+1.34	$88,289.32
Green	Douglas Roy	206	2.18	+0.65	$0.00
Total valid votes/expense limit		9,454	100.0		
Total rejected ballots		88			
Turnout		9,542	51.1		
Eligible voters		18,665			
New Democratic gain from Liberal		Swing		+15.25	
Source: Elections Canada

2015 Canadian federal election
Party	Candidate	Votes	%	±%	Expenditures
Liberal	Hunter Tootoo	5,619	47.11	+18.41	$32,110.96
New Democratic	Jack Iyerak Anawak	3,171	26.58	+7.22	–
Conservative	Leona Aglukkaq	2,956	24.78	-25.12	$36,393.17
Green	Spencer Rocchi	182	1.53	-0.51	–
Total valid votes/expense limit		11,928	100.00		$203,887.65
Total rejected ballots		95	0.79	–	
Turnout		12,203	62.54	–	
Eligible voters		19,223			
Liberal gain from Conservative		Swing		+21.77	
Source: Elections Canada

2011 Canadian federal election
Party	Candidate	Votes	%	±%
Conservative	Leona Aglukkaq	3,930	49.85	+15.07
Liberal	Paul Okalik	2,260	28.62	−0.38
New Democratic	Jack Hicks	1,525	19.44	−8.18
Green	Scott MacCallum	160	2.1	−6.27
Total valid votes		7,875	100.0	
Total rejected ballots		56	0.71	
Turnout		7,931	46.66	
Eligible voters		16,998		
Conservative hold		Swing		+7.73

2008 Canadian federal election
Party	Candidate	Votes	%	±%	Expenditures
Conservative	Leona Aglukkaq	2,806	34.78	+5.72	$59,574
Liberal	Kirt Ejesiak	2,359	29.24	−10.74	$59,600
New Democratic	Paul Irngaut	2,228	27.62	+10.47	$20,095
Green	Peter Ittinuar	675	8.37	+2.45	
Total valid votes/expense limit		8,068	100.0		$80,098
Conservative gain from Liberal		Swing		+8.23	

2006 Canadian federal election
Party	Candidate	Votes	%	±%	Expenditures
Liberal	Nancy Karetak-Lindell	3,673	39.98	−11.32	$10,669
Conservative	David Aglukark	2,670	29.06	+14.62	$5,486
New Democratic	Bill Riddell	1,576	17.15	+1.98	$11,990
Marijuana	D. Ed deVries	724	7.88	–	$1,162
Green	Feliks Kappi	544	5.92	+2.59	$3,950
Total valid votes/expense limit		9,187	100.0		$74,506
Total rejected ballots		64	0.70		
Turnout		9,251	54.10		
Liberal hold		Swing		−12.97	

2004 Canadian federal election
Party	Candidate	Votes	%	±%	Expenditures
Liberal	Nancy Karetak-Lindell	3,818	51.30	−17.71	$18,035
Independent	Manitok Thompson	1,172	15.74	–	$5,945
New Democratic	Bill Riddell	1,129	15.17	−3.09	$12,810
Conservative	Duncan Cunningham	1,075	14.44	+6.24	$16,838
Green	Nedd Kenney	248	3.33	−1.19	$190
Total valid votes		7,442	100.00		
Total rejected ballots		33	0.44		
Turnout		7,475	43.86		
Liberal hold		Swing		−16.72	
Change for the Conservatives is based on the results of the Progressive Conservatives.

2000 Canadian federal election
Party	Candidate	Votes	%	±%	Expenditures
Liberal	Nancy Karetak-Lindell	5,327	69.01	+23.13	$35,282
New Democratic	Palluq Susan Enuaraq	1,410	18.26	−5.50	
Progressive Conservative	Mike Sherman	633	8.20	−15.93	$6,045
Green	Brian Robert Jones	349	4.52	–	$9,304
Total valid votes		7,719	100.00		
Total rejected ballots		54	0.69		
Turnout		7,773	54.10		
Liberal hold		Swing		+14.32	

1997 Canadian federal election
Party	Candidate	Votes	%	±%	Expenditures
Liberal	Nancy Karetak-Lindell	3,302	45.88	−23.87	$30,212
Progressive Conservative	Okalik Eegeesiak	1,737	24.13	+3.54	$11,251
New Democratic	Hunter Tootoo	1,710	23.76	+14.10	$11,918
Reform	John Turner	447	6.21	–	
Total valid votes		7,196	100.00		
Total rejected ballots		48	0.66		
Turnout		7,244	59.80		
Liberal notional hold		Swing		−13.70	

=== Nunatsiaq ===
1993 Canadian federal election
Party	Candidate	Votes	%	±%
Liberal	Jack Iyerak Anawak	6,685	69.79	+29.85
Progressive Conservative	Leena Evic-Twerdin	1,970	20.57	−2.37
New Democratic	Mike Illnik	924	9.65	−23.51
Total valid votes		9,579	100.00	
Liberal hold		Swing		+16.11

1988 Canadian federal election
Party	Candidate	Votes	%	±%
Liberal	Jack Iyerak Anawak	3,356	39.94	+11.04
New Democratic	Peter Kusugak	2,786	33.15	+4.50
Progressive Conservative	Sedluk Bryan Pearson	1,928	22.94	−28.52
Independent	Richard Inukpak Lee	333	3.96	–
Total valid votes		8,403	100.00	
Liberal gain from Progressive Conservative		Swing		+3.27

1984 Canadian federal election
Party	Candidate	Votes	%	±%
Progressive Conservative	Thomas Suluk	2,237	32.49	+24.71
Liberal	Robert Kuptana	1,990	28.90	−12.90
New Democratic	Rhoda Innuksuk	1,973	28.65	−18.61
Independent	Peter Ittinuar	686	9.96	–
Total valid votes		6,886	100.00	
Progressive Conservative gain from New Democratic		Swing		+18.80
Independent candidate Peter Ittinuar lost 37.31 percentage points from the 1980 election, when he ran as a New Democrat.

1980 Canadian federal election
Party	Candidate	Votes	%	±%
New Democratic	Peter Ittinuar	2,688	47.27	+10.99
Liberal	James Arvaluk	2,377	41.80	+15.81
Progressive Conservative	Lyle Stevenson	442	7.77	−18.22
Rhinoceros	Lloyd Ellsworth	180	3.17	–
Total valid votes		5,687	100.00	
New Democratic hold		Swing		−2.41
lop.parl.ca

1979 Canadian federal election
Party	Candidate	Votes	%
New Democratic	Peter Ittinuar	1,963	37.74
Liberal	Tagak Curley	1,887	36.27
Progressive Conservative	Abe Okpik	1,352	25.99
Total valid votes		5,202	100.00
This riding was created from part of Northwest Territories, where New Democrat Wally Firth was the incumbent.

== See also ==
- List of Canadian electoral districts
- Historical federal electoral districts of Canada
